= Football in Queensland =

Numerous codes of football are played in Queensland, Australia:

The most popular football code in Queensland is rugby league

- For Association Football (soccer) see Football Queensland
- For rugby league see Queensland Rugby League and National Rugby League
  - For teams see Brisbane Broncos, Gold Coast Titans and North Queensland Cowboys
- For rugby union see Queensland Rugby Union
- For Australian rules see Australian rules football in Queensland
