= 1968 Minor States Carnival =

The 1968 Minor States Carnival, known more formally as the 1968 ANFC Division 2 Championship was an edition of the lower division of Australian National Football Carnival, an Australian rules football interstate competition. The competition was won by the Australian Amateurs.

The competition was held in Canberra on the Queen's Birthday long weekend. The format was a simple knock-out tournament. The winner received the R. T. Rush Trophy, named after ANFC president Bob Rush.

== Results ==
	Semi-finals
Saturday, 8 June (11:20am)	Australian Amateurs 20.18 (138)	def.	Queensland 9.12 (66)	Manuka Oval
Saturday, 8 June (2:15pm)	Canberra 15.16 (106)	def.	New South Wales 15.12 (102)	Manuka Oval

	Third place playoff
Monday, 10 June (11:30am)	Queensland 20.13 (133)	def.	New South Wales 11.15 (81)	Manuka Oval

	Final
Monday, 10 June (2:15pm)	Australian Amateurs 19.19 (133)	def.	Canberra 5.4 (34)	Manuka Oval
