= Australian rules football in Queensland =

First official football code played in 1866

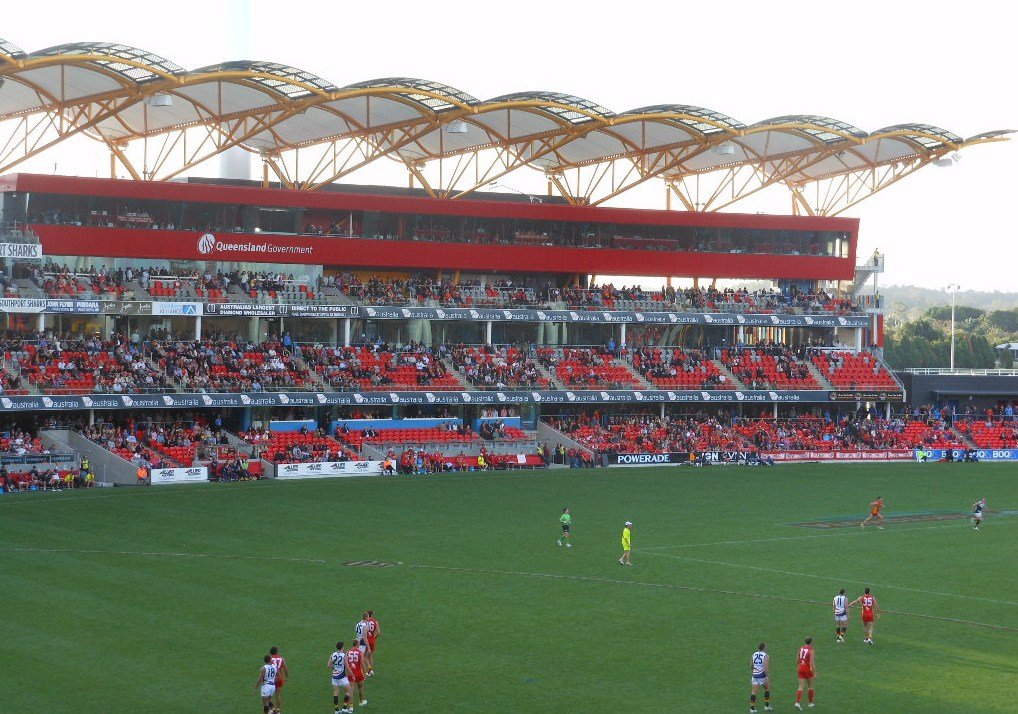
- Australian football at Carrara Stadium on the Gold Coast 2011
- Governing body: AFL Queensland
- Representative team: Queensland
- First played: Brisbane 9 June 1866; 160 years ago
- Registered players: 58,208 (total); 16,753 (female); 3,798 (child)
- Clubs: 130 (10 competitions)

Club competitions
- List: Queensland Australian Football League; AFLQ State Association; AFL Cairns; AFL Capricornia; AFL Darling Downs; AFL Mackay; AFL Mount Isa; AFL Townsville; AFL Wide Bay

Audience records
- Single match: 37,473 (2019). AFL Second Qualifying Final Brisbane Lions vs Richmond (Gabba, Brisbane)

In Queensland, Australian rules football (known mainly as "AFL") is a moderately popular spectator and participation sport governed by AFL Queensland. It dates back to the colonial era in 1866 and was the first and most popular football code until 1883 when it fell behind the Barassi line. There has been continuous organised competition since the 20th century.

The state is the sport's third largest audience with the Australian Football League (AFL) Premiership Season generating more than a million television viewers, though spectator numbers fluctuate with the success of its two fully professional AFL clubs: the Brisbane Lions (founded in 1996 through the merger of the Queensland based Brisbane Bears with a Victorian club) and Gold Coast Suns (founded 2009). Both clubs also field a side in the national women's competition (AFLW) and compete against each other in the QClash. Queensland was the second state in history to hold an AFL Grand Final and the first to hold an AFL Women's Grand Final. The Gabba is the sport's flagship venue, set to be replaced by Brisbane Stadium, currently under construction which when completed in 2032, will increase capacity to 63,000 seats.

The participation rate is 1.3%. Despite having the third largest population, it has the second lowest player base and participation rate of any state. There are 51,941 adult and 3,798 children (around a quarter are female) playing full contact across more than 10 competitions and 130 clubs. The most popular competitions are in South East Queensland and the Cairns Region, the semi-professional Queensland Australian Football League and AFL Cairns respectively. Despite being the fourth in football participation behind soccer, touch and rugby league, according to Ausplay it is one of the top 10 team sports in the state.

Queensland's first representative football team, known as the "Maroons", experienced limited success in its matches between 1884 and 1988. Brisbane hosted national carnivals in 1958 and 1961. Despite a poor record historically, Queensland won Section B national titles in 1974 and 1979. Zane Taylor holds the record for the number of representative caps. The Teal Cup competition (now AFL National Championships) began in Brisbane. Prior to its national expansion, Queensland's underage side dominated the competition with 12 titles. Since going national from 1976–2016, it won 4 Division 2 titles, the most recent in 2015.

More than 300 Queenslanders have debuted at AFL/AFLW level since Erwin Dornau in 1948. Jason Dunstall, the first inducted into the Australian Football Hall of Fame and granted Legend status, has the most goals, his tally of 1254 is the third highest in league history. Michael Voss, Jason Akermanis and Simon Black who all have connections to Queensland have Brownlow medals and are triple-premiership players. Dayne Zorko has the most games. In the women's Ally Anderson and Emily Bates have competition best and fairests while Tahlia Randall has the most games and most goals.

== History ==
=== 1860s: Early Beginnings in South East Queensland ===
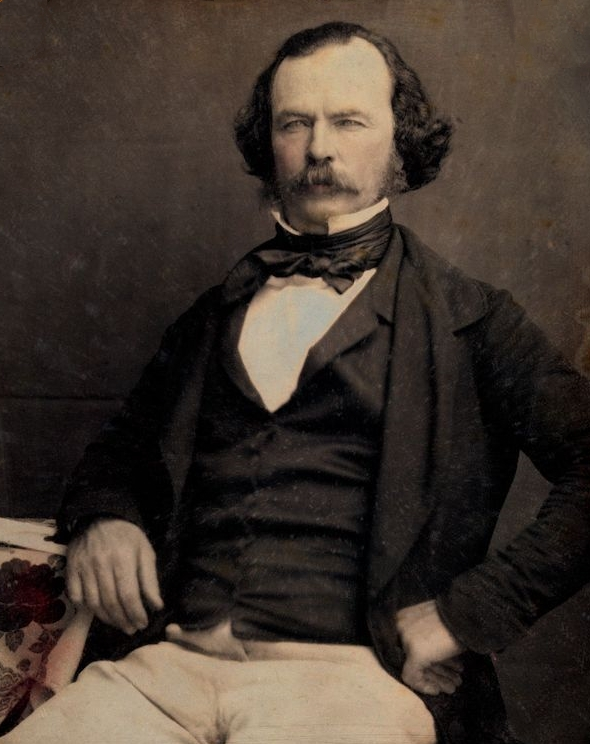
Horatio Wills in 1859 shortly before he brought his footballing family to Queensland, including his son Tom Wills, founder of Australian football

Football matches had been played early on in what was known as "Moreton Bay", with some of the earliest evidence dating back to 1849, however it is not known under what rules they played and there were no established codes. The Victorian Rules, first drafted in 1859, were brought to the newly self-governed Colony of Queensland by migrants from the Colony of Victoria and in the 1860s was the first organized code to arrive.

Tom Wills who chaired that meeting in 1859 and helped popularise the code across Victoria, moved to Queensland along with his father Horatio Wills in October 1861 to work on the family grazing property near Springsure in Central Queensland. While Horatio was killed during the Cullin-la-ringo massacre and Tom returned to Victoria in 1864, his brothers Cedric and Horace (both played alongside Tom at the Geelong Football Club) continued their football involvement in Brisbane, as did many other associates of Wills.

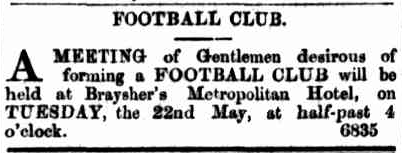
Front page advertisement for Football Club meeting from the Brisbane Courier 21 May 1866

Not long after the redrafting of the laws on 1 May 1866 and the widespread distribution in the Australasian on 19 May, an advertisement appearing in the Brisbane Courier on 21 May called for a meeting to form a Brisbane club. The first Brisbane Football Club was incorporated the following day on 22 May 1866 and chose to play under the then widely distributed Victorian Rules.

Queensland at the time was one of the poorest colonies (especially in comparison to booming Victoria), having begun as a penal settlement it was very much a frontier colony and relied heavily on investment from the southern colonies. With its population of under 90,000 in 1866, it was dwarfed by Victoria's rapidly growing population of 640,000. In contrast to Victoria's population which migrated from around the world, the Queensland colony consisted primarily of those from Great Britain and New South Wales. Nevertheless, Brisbane was the first football club of any code in the colony.

The majority of the founders of Brisbane FC had prior exposure to the game during its rapid rise in popularity in Victoria. Of the six founding members four were from Victoria – none were from Queensland. One of three members of the founding committee was Charles Edward Wallen, who had played for Scotch College in the experimental rules matches umpired by Tom Wills in 1858. Tom Board and George Clencross-Smith were both teammates of Tom Wills at Geelong Football Club. Studholme Hart had played in 1859 with South Yarra. Founding chair David Watterston moved from Melbourne to Ipswich in 1860 and was a member of Brisbane's Victorian Cricket Club (formed 1863 and consisting of ex-Victorian players). His cricket club had on 26 May proposed that cricket make way off-season for football. Significantly, on 1 June 1866, the Brisbane Courier published the Melbourne Football Club rules as the official rules for the Queensland colony.

The club played the first of several scratch matches on Saturday 9 June 1866 at Queen's Park (now part of the Brisbane City Botanic Gardens). The early rules stipulated that the first team to reach 2 of 3 goals would be declared the winner. The first official fixture scheduled for 14 July was cancelled due to wet weather, but later played on 21 July 1866 between the All Comers and Civil Servants, the game was declared a nil all draw. It was decided to continue the match a week later on 28 July, but and after a marathon 5 hours without scoring it was declared a draw. Matches often went scoreless and it wasn't until 4 August that the first goal would be kicked after an hour of play by former Sydneysider George Cowlishaw while playing for the All Comers.

Ipswich Grammar School in the town of Ipswich west of Brisbane was the first school in Queensland to adopt football in 1868 care of new headmaster John McCrae of Scotch College in Melbourne. The National School was to join the fledgeling schools' competition in 1869. Brisbane Grammar travelled to Ipswich to play Ipswich Grammar in October 1869 to play the first ever school match and would form the Brisbane Grammar School Football Club in May 1870.

=== 1870s: The code spreads west and north ===
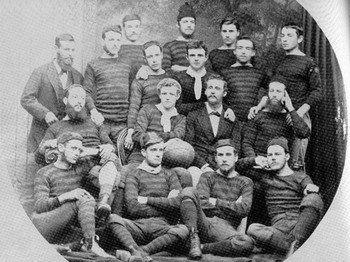
Brisbane Football Club in 1879, Queensland's first football club formed to play Australian rules but experimented with soccer and rugby in its early years

Despite the slow start the game began to spread rapidly during the 1870s. By 1870 there were five clubs: Brisbane, Volunteer Artillery, Brisbane Grammar, Civil Service and Ipswich, all adopting the Victorian Rules (as it was then known).

The code continued to expand to the west in Ipswich, with Ipswich Grammar helping popularise the code there and help establish the senior Ipswich Football Club and Ipswich Railways (known as "Railway Workshop Football Club") in May 1870 and April 1871 respectively. Ipswich Grammar's influence in the code's development was formidable, while the senior clubs went into recess early in the decade due to player numbers, the school continued to fly the flag and by the end of the decade the flow of juniors helped the become the major stronghold for the code with no less than 7 clubs regularly competing against each other.

A club also formed in Rockhampton, Capricornia in 1873 to play under Australian rules on the local cricket ground.

By the time rugby was imported from Britain in 1876, Victorian Rules had well established itself as the colony's premier football code. Though in areas outside Brisbane there was growing confusion amongst clubs over which set of rules to adopt, and while some experimented with rugby most simply defaulted to the Victorian rules. The code in Brisbane was still dominant and in 1876 several newly formed Brisbane rugby union clubs including Rangers and Bonnet Rouge moved to switch codes citing the game's huge popularity in Melbourne.

The game had spread to the Darling Downs and Toowoomba by 1876 with a match between Civil Service and the newly formed Toowoomba Football Club. The region sooned formed the football league, the Toowoomba Football Association which initially featured four senior clubs – Light Infantry, Civil Service, Toowoomba and Warwick but expanded to include a number of junior and regional clubs including Stanthorpe, Adavale, Roma, and Thargomindah. As the game spread further west of the Great Divide clubs were split on whether to adopt rugby. Some of the Downs clubs lacked nearby opponents and appear to have preferred rugby, as a result competition went into recess a few years later until matches were played by Toowoomba Grammar.

Queensland clubs affiliated with the Victorian Football Association (VFA) in 1877, and the game became known in Queensland as the "Victorian Association rules", "Victorian association football" (or sometimes just "Association Football" or "Association rules").

In 1878, the main clubs playing rugby, Rangers and Bonnet Rouge folded, and Brisbane FC, lacking opposition teams returned to Australian rules. Rugby was left without any clubs in the city. However, it was beginning to gain ground in smaller country towns which didn't have the numbers of funds to tour as full Australian football teams.

Former Brisbane Grammarian and Brisbane FC player Herbert W. Bryant, while playing with Essendon in the VFA had the honour of being the first Queenslander to play for Victoria's team in the first intercolonial Victoria v South Australia (1879).

Competition began in Wide Bay–Burnett in 1881, with the establishment of clubs in Maryborough and Gympie. The Darling Downs competition also expanded to include Allora in 1883 providing more regular interaction between the clubs.

Competition in Far North Queensland was recorded as early as August 1884 with the first match in Cairns was played against a representative team from Townsville. An association also began in Charters Towers with the town competing against nearby Millchester in 1885. The code also reached the Mackay Region in 1885 however was short-lived there.

By 1885 the code had expanded further west still, with clubs established in Stanthorpe and had penetrated the outback as far as Cunnamulla, Roma, Adavale, Thargominda and Normanton. The Capricornia competition had also expanded in Rockhampton with the formation of the North Rockhampton Football Club and a club in Gladstone.

=== 1880s: Queensland Football Association era ===
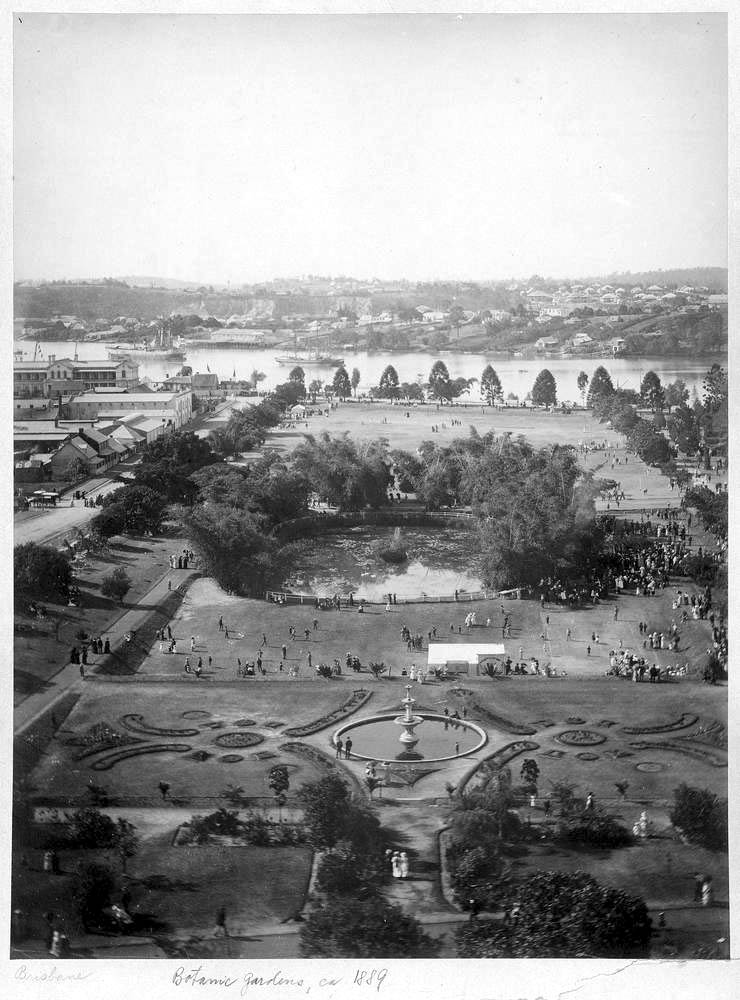
Queen's Park playing field (now City Botanic Gardens) at the far end

A meeting was held on 30 April 1880 at the Queen's Hotel for the purpose of forming the Queensland Football Association (QFA) to affiliate with the Victorian Football Association. The formation was opposed by the premier Queensland club, the Brisbane Football Club, through its representative E.C. Binge, believing that it had the right to govern itself and use its position of influence to lead the other clubs. However, his motion lapsed and the formation proceeded. While there were no dedicated rugby clubs, many of Brisbane and Wallaroo's best players preferred to play both codes, so rugby matches were facilitated during the season on a Saturday every 4 weeks. While club rugby was nowhere near as popular with the public, Brisbane FC being by far the strongest club would often field its best players in rugby and its seconds in Victorian Association matches.

While Victorian Association was popular, Queensland clubs, particularly the newly formed ones that were beginning to make hard decisions on rule adoption. Many players wanted to represent Queensland and many were convinced that adopting rugby would be the best option for this. Rules to protect players against dangerous pushing during contests for example were desperately sought, and some in the Brisbane media were claiming that rugby rules were safer as a result. Clubs were becoming increasingly disgruntled by the lack of representation or consultation on the laws of the game and governance from Melbourne.

By 1883 QFA membership consisted of 900 Victorian Association members from throughout the colony and 80 Rugby Union members mostly from Brisbane.

==== Rugby rebellion: local clubs and schools reject the Victorian Association ====
If that game (Rugby) takes root in the Brisbane schools, let alone Ipswich or other towns, then say good bye Melbourne, prepare your own epitaph, select your burial year and place, your death is nigh at hand.

— The Queensland Figaro, 15 September 1883

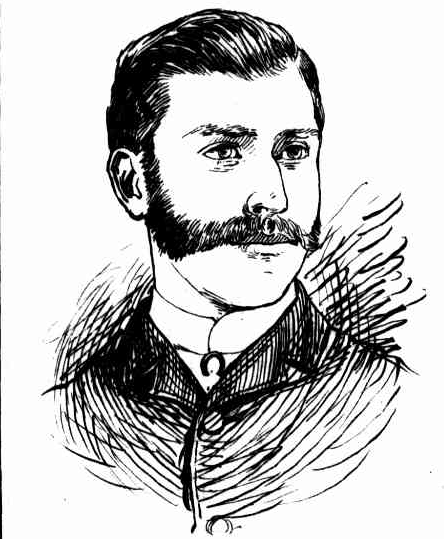
Prominent athlete Harry Pritchard, former Brisbane Grammarian, Brisbane FC and Queensland captain the prodigous kicker switched codes in 1884 to become one of rugby's star players

Migration trends did no favours for the code with Brisbane's population tripling over the next decade, migration from Victoria was rapidly supplanted by the British Isles and neighbouring New South Wales bringing with them a strong preference toward the British football codes.

A growing rift between Victorian Association and its Rugby Union members came to a head in 1883 after QFA clubs had been pushed annually to vote as to whether to continue under the Victorian Association or adopt Rugby Union rules. Whilst the rugby fraternity was vastly outnumbered (just a handful of rugby clubs compared to more than 50 senior Victorian association clubs), their push for intercolonial matches against New South Wales was enormously popular. There was increasing discontent among all QFA members with Melbourne's apparent disinterest in sending teams to Queensland. The QFA felt that the wealthier Victorian Association were more capable of covering the travel expenses than the Queenslanders, while the Rugby Union members were more than prepared to cover the costs of the shorter trip to Sydney. Rugby players were also disgruntled with having to play under Association rules and were dissatisfied with the Victorian Association's growing contempt for rugby. Under pressure from its members, the QFA organised the first intercolonial to be played under Victorian Rules between New South Wales and Queensland. The two colonies played each other in a two-game series in Brisbane in August 1884 resulting in a 1–1 draw. The first match attracted a modest crowd of 300 spectators and increased interest in the contest resulted in the second match drawing 2,000. Many of the players also played rugby and Queensland rugby footballers began to bypass the QFA to directly organise rugby tests with New South Wales. This angered the QFA and in an effort to uphold Victorian Rules, and with support unforthcoming from Melbourne on the issue, a motion was passed by the QFA secretary that effectively barred players found to be playing Rugby Union from playing at a Victorian Association club, effectively segregating the two codes for the first time since its inception. The move was to backfire as the breakaway Northern Rugby Union (NRU) formed, taking disgruntled clubs and players with it. These clubs in response, instituted the barring of rugby players from playing Victorian rules and Rugby players and officials began derogatively reverting to the term "Melbourne Association" and "Melbourne Rules" in reference to the QFA and its rules fuelling a sentiment of them being increasingly anti-rugby and anti-Queensland. In mid-1885 the Wallaroo club in Brisbane voted to become a rugby club and seceded from the QFA.

The lack of a player transfer system was exposed in 1886 when players began freely changing clubs and codes from week to week without accountability, the situation was becoming farcical and supporters quickly lost confidence in the QFA.

Suffering from dwindling numbers, the 1886 Queensland team was humiliated by New South Wales in their intercolonial matches. The Victorian game supporters were struggling hard to uphold the premier position they had gained. In contrast within just two years of its founding, the locally governed breakaway NRU competition came to dominate sport in Queensland and, according to one writer, "The defining moment in the code battle came with the 1886 Queensland [Rugby] side, who defeated NSW for the first time in Sydney. The success of this team undoubtedly won the day for rugby game in Queensland. After the brilliant performance of the 1886 Queensland rugby team, who lost only one match through their tour, the rugby game became very popular and the next season several new clubs were formed and the Victorian game began to wane".

Australian rules, however, was still strong in the schools. Brisbane Grammar through Richard Powell Francis had switched to rugby in 1885. Though Grammar continued to play Victorian Association matches against Ipswich, it lobbied hard for the other Independent Schools to switch away from them. Perhaps the death blow occurred when Independent Schools headmasters in 1887 voted by 1 vote to adopt rugby. The majority of councillors objected on the basis that the reference of "Victorian" in the name of the sport did not represent the interests of Queenslanders.

Between 1885 and 1887, for the first time in the history of the colony, mainstream newspapers began to report rugby results first, followed by Australian football and association football, signalling the premier status of the rugby code. Despite the Victorian Association having 10 times the participation of rugby in terms of players and clubs, regular competitive intercolonial representation was by far the most important to the players and the public, the QFA was just not able to offer this.

=== 1890s: QFA Collapse and the end of an era ===
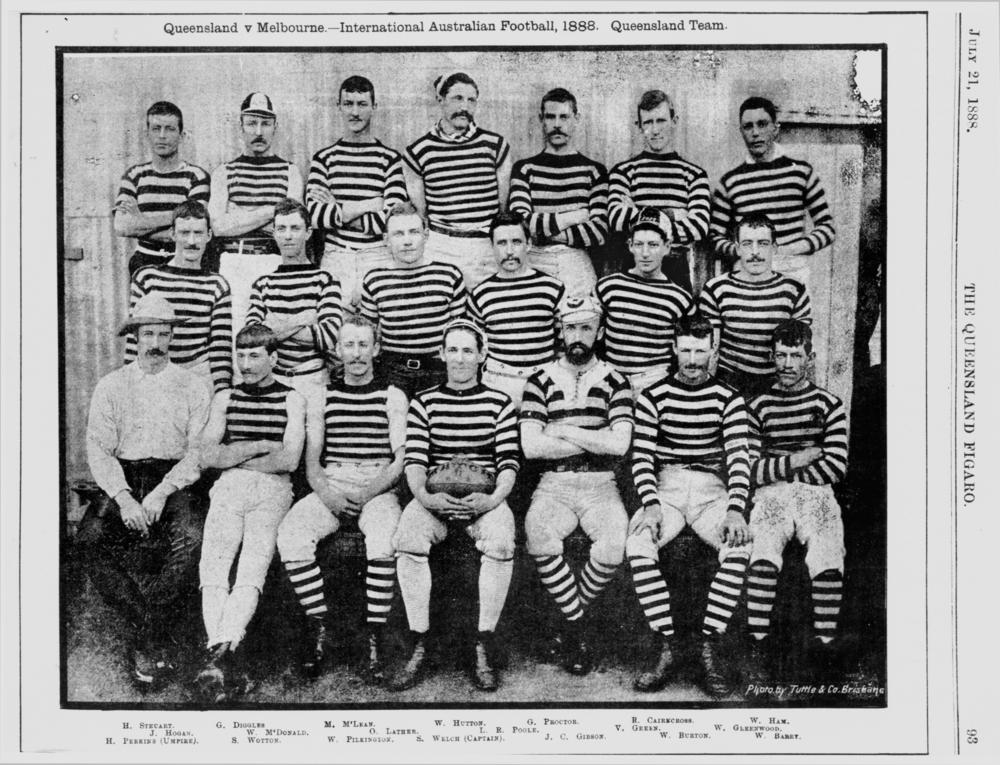
The Queensland state team who played Melbourne in 1888

Despite the advances made by Queensland football, it was clear that Victoria was progressing faster than any other state while the code in Queensland had been going backwards. In an effort to reverse the decline, the QFA had been calling on the VFA for years to send teams to Queensland to play exhibition matches which were largely ignored. In 1888 it finally secured the first visit from a colonial team slated to be from all of Victoria. However a representative Melbourne team arrived in June 1888. The QFA assembled a Queensland team consisting of players principally from Ipswich topped up with a scattering of players from Brisbane. The match was played at the Brisbane Exhibition Grounds with the home team lost 3–5 to the visitors 6–16 in front of 5,000 spectators. Rugby officials had deferred matches for the event, though noted that both Queenslander players and spectators appeared to have little understanding of the game. Several Melbourne clubs followed shortly thereafter including the Melbourne Football Club.

A representative match between Brisbane and Ipswich was held in June 1890 won by Brisbane 3 goals 6 to Ipswich 3 goals 5.

On 21 June 1890, South Melbourne Football Club toured, playing against Queensland on Albion Park. The result of the match was a complete 6–17 to 1–0 humiliation (behinds were recorded in the scores at the time but did not actually count until 1897). The humiliation was obviously felt by the players as when Queensland defeated a New South Wales Rugby Union team shortly afterwards many of the former rugby players receded from the Australian football ranks and formed clubs of their own.

The Queensland Football Association, already under heavy criticism, folded at the end of the 1890 season. With the gap left by the collapse of Victorian Association, the majority of the Brisbane clubs switched to rugby, while clubs in Ipswich and Toowoomba also switched, folded or joined the ranks of the Anglo-Queensland Football Association. The Australian code quietly disappeared with no clubs surviving the 1890s.

=== Comeback attempt in Ipswich (1892) ===
A meeting was held in July 1892 to re-establish the code instigated by the Ipswich Football Club. It was initially successful, with a well attended representative match played between Brisbane and Ipswich staged at the North Ipswich Reserve. Ipswich won 4 goals 12 to 3 goals 7. Optimistic of an Australian rules revival, Ipswich's Athenian Football Club reformed, consisting almost entirely of rugby converts, and contested another high-profile match against a reformed Ipswich Football Club at the North Ipswich Reserve, the match won by the Athenians 6 goals 4 to 4 goals 5. Ipswich and Brisbane teams met again in August at Queens Park in Brisbane. While interest remained strong in Ipswich, the rugby dominated Brisbane media appeared disinterested in the return match and the code's comeback attempt failed. Reluctantly the Ipswich and Athenian clubs returned to playing rugby the following year.

=== 1900s: Post-Federation Australasian Rules Revival ===
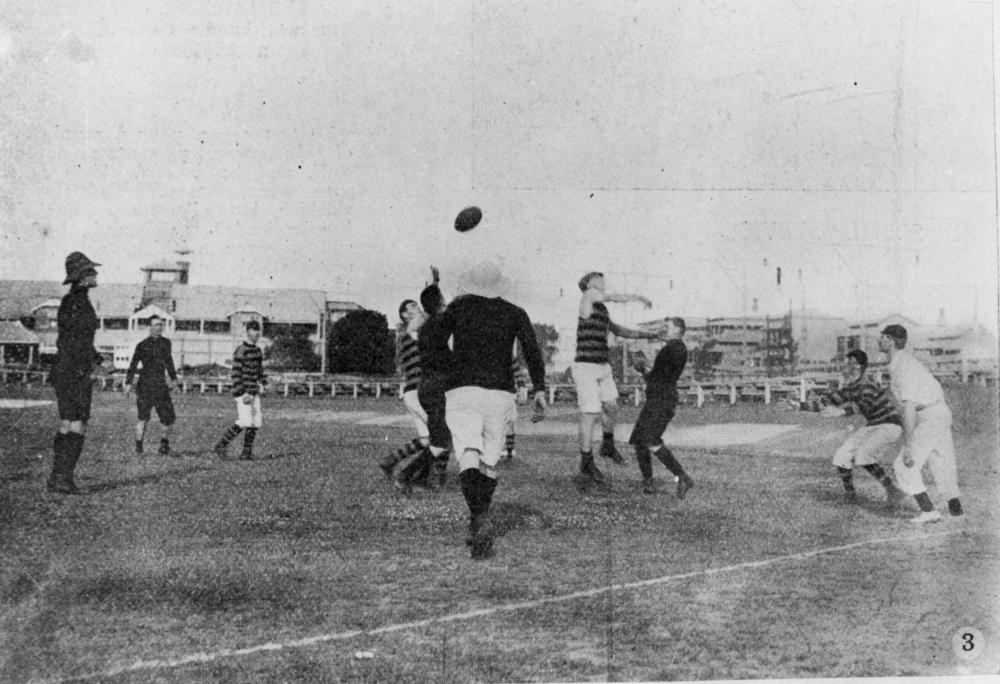
Australian Football Premiership Grand Final at the Brisbane Cricket Ground, 1907. Locomotives defeated Wynnum by 40 points

With Federation of the colonies Australian rules was to benefit from a renewed interest in Australian nationalism.

A meeting was held in 1900 in an effort to revive the code. However this was made more difficult as rugby interests had rebranded their sport in Queensland as "Australian Football" and soccer was then known as "Anglo-Australian Football", presenting a major branding obstacle. In an effort to differentiate, the new association chose the provisional title for the new league as the rather awkwardly worded "Queensland Association of the Australian Game of Football".

Competition recommenced in 1900 in of all places, Maryborough in Wide Bay, with senior and junior competitions including the Wallaroo club, which had continued to field both Australian rules and rugby teams, and the Victorians club. This was followed by a match between Brisbane and Ipswich.

The Queensland Football League (QFL) was formed in July 1903 at a meeting with 50 present at the South Brisbane Cycling Club and a total of 150 signed on as members. Unlike the previous league which affiliated with the VFA, this new body decided to affiliate with the Victorian Football League. Practice matches were held in August that year in the Botanical Gardens and attracted large crowds and interest. The first premiership was held in 1904 with most games being played at Queen's Park, a sporting facility within the grounds of the Brisbane Botanic Gardens.

Competition in Ipswich, once the code's stronghold in Queensland was rekindled through an exhibition match between Locomotives and Brisbanes. The Ipswich Football Club was reformed in May 1906 and matches resumed at the North Ipswich Reserve. Several Ipswich clubs and schools resuming to play the sport from the following year including juniors at Ipswich North State School and Newtown schools.

From 1905 to 1914 games were regularly played at the Brisbane Cricket Ground. Clubs included Brisbanes, Locomotives, Ipswich, Citys, Valleys and Wynnum.

In 1908, Queensland again sent delegates to the Australasian Football Council, this time, fielding a side in the Jubilee Australian Football Carnival which saw all Australian states as well as New Zealand compete.

The sport was reintroduced to Far North Queensland during both World Wars. In 1913, a team of servicemen briefly existed on Thursday Island.

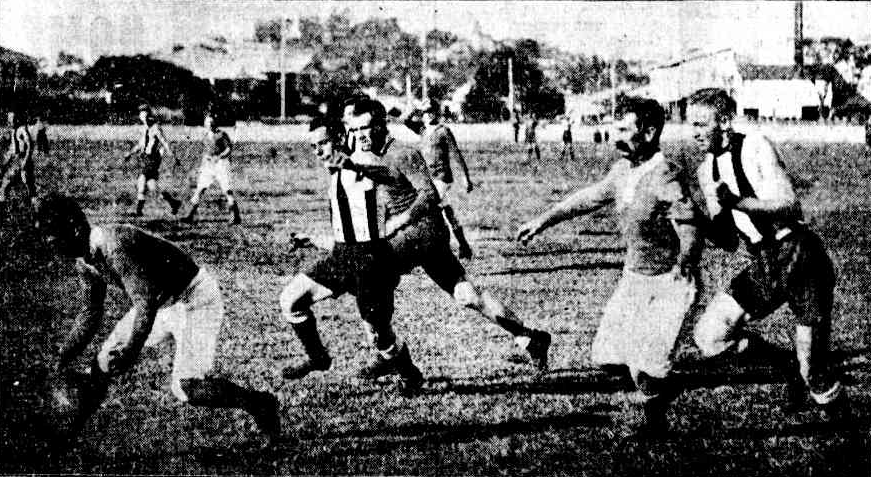
Action from the 1923 Grand Final between Brisbane and Valleys at Perry Park

In 1914 a carnival to promote the code was held in Brisbane. The participating teams were Collingwood (representing Victoria), Perth (representing West Australia), South Adelaide (representing South Australia) and Cananore (representing Tasmania).

Between 1915 and 1919 the Queensland Football League went into recess owing to World War I.

=== Between the Wars: The Game Expands ===
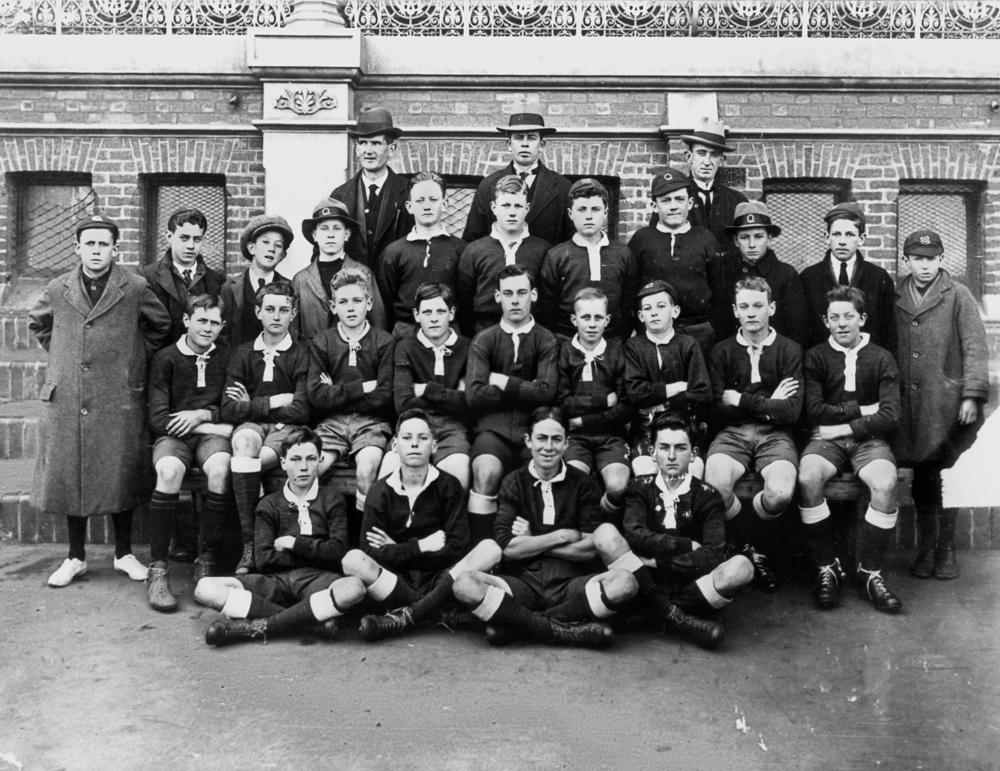
Queensland Schoolboys team 1926

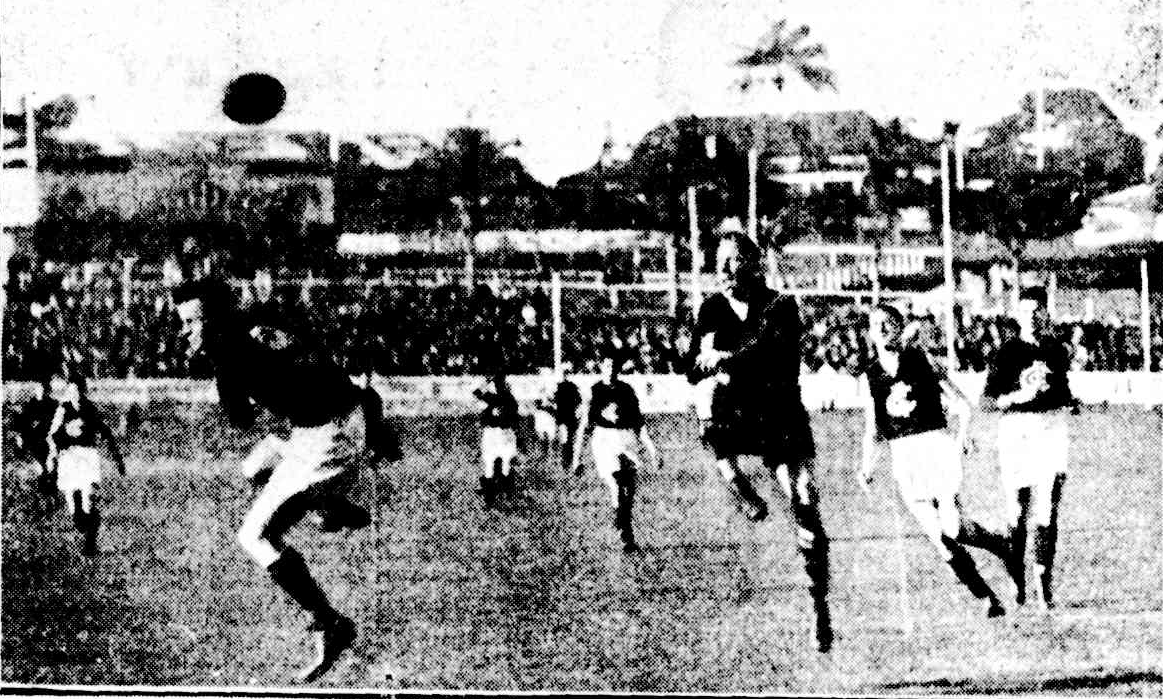
VFL exhibition match Carlton vs Richmond at Brisbane Exhibition Ground in 1930

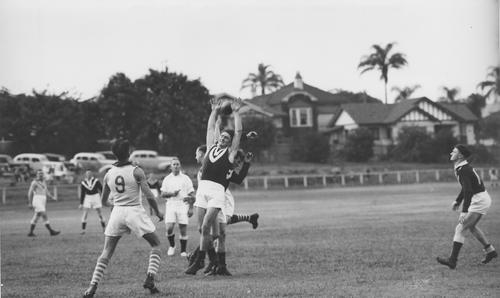
Taringa vs Wests Australian rules football match QANFL match at Perry Park in the 1930s

In August 1927 at a meeting of the Australian National Football Council it was decided that each of the state leagues were to include the words 'Australian National' in their names. Accordingly, the QFL was renamed the Queensland Australian National Football League (QANFL) and football continued a steady growth in Brisbane.

The first matches in Mount Isa were played in 1932. The city had 3 clubs by 1933. An association was also formed around Cairns in 1932. In its first match combined Cairns-Gordonvale team defeated a team from Tully 9 goals 9 to 5 goals 10. However these competitions were short-lived as promotional assistance from the ANFC was not forthcoming.

A VFL exhibition match was played between powerhouse clubs Carlton FC and Richmond FC at the Exhibition Ground in 1930 drew 12,000 and raised £622 for the clubs.

In 1944, a league of servicemen was formed around the Atherton Tableland. Teams represented included Wongabel, Wondelca, Kairi, Mareeba and Ravenshoe.

=== Post War Era: Queensland Football Comes of Age ===
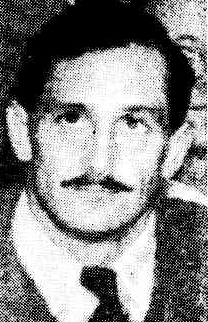
Tom Calder captain coached Queensland in 1948 following a move to QAFL club Mayne

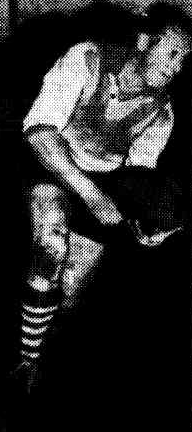
Queensland's first born and bred VFL/AFL footballer, Erwin Dornau in South Melbourne Football Club colours in 1952

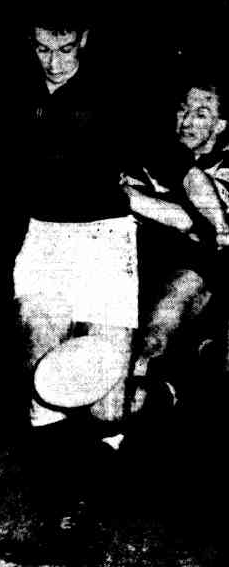
VFL star John Coleman kicks one of 13 goals under lights during a blockbuster match between Essendon and Geelong at the Brisbane Exhibition Ground in 1952

The late 1940s and early 1950s would see an era of growth.

In 1946, Queensland defeated New South Wales for the first time in interstate football. Unlike the first few decades, matches during the following decades would be close between the two sides increasing the interest in the contests.

Erwin Dornau became the first Queenslander in to play in the VFL in 1948.

With the increasing interest in the code, Brisbane Rugby League administrators began to block access to the Brisbane Cricket Ground for proposed exhibition matches by the VFL leaving only the Brisbane Exhibition Ground for the VFL to play on.

Prior to the establishment of the Sunshine Coast urban area and resort towns like Noosa Heads, matches were played there as early as 1952 in the original settlements of the area. Following an exhibition match between Yeronga Football Club and Kedron Football Club at Cooroy showgrounds that attracted an enthusiastic crowd of 650, a local league known as the "Cooroy National Football Association" was active with clubs in Cooroy, Nambour and Tewantin, however was short-lived.

In 1952, the Brisbane Exhibition Ground hosted a VFL match between Essendon and Geelong for "National Day Round" drew 28,000 spectators and was the first official VFL match to be played under floodlights.

The first recorded women's match was played in 1955 in front of a crowd of 4,000 at Perry Park between the Brisbane Bombers and Sandgate Sirens.

In 1955 a league was introduced to Townsville. Competition also began that year in Cairns and in 1957 land was purchased in Cairns for the first dedicated field and competition began there. In the same year a league was also introduced to Mount Isa.

Another VFL exhibition game was played at the Brisbane Cricket Ground in 1959, attracting a large crowd.

The code boomed at junior level during the 1950s and by 1960, with a tripling of the number of schools playing the code and more than 5,000 juniors playing across the state.

In 1961, the first league commenced on the Gold Coast.

In 1964 the QANFL became the Queensland Australian Football League (QAFL), a limited liability company.

In the early 1970s, the first permanent leagues appeared on the Sunshine Coast (1970) Mackay (1970), the Darling Downs (1971), Bundaberg-Wide Bay (1971) and Rockhampton (Capricornia) (1972).

=== 1980s: Brisbane Bears Era ===
Born and raised Queenslander Jason Dunstall debuted for the Hawthorn Hawks in 1985 and quickly became one of the greatest players in the game, despite remaining almost unknown in his home state. He briefly represented a Queensland State of Origin team which played in a low key game against New South Wales in Sydney.

On 1 October 1986 the VFL board was announced that teams from Brisbane (Brisbane Bears) and Perth (West Coast Eagles) would compete in the Victorian Football League (VFL) from 1987. Much of the Bears team were South Australian players from the South Australian National Football League and Victorians from the Victorian Football League. Although the team was known as Brisbane, home games were played at Carrara Stadium on the Gold Coast, nearly 100 km from Brisbane.

The Bears were hugely unsuccessful on the field, and with the admission of the successful Brisbane Broncos rugby league team into the New South Wales Rugby League, the popularity of Australian rules football plummeted, while the successful Broncos, made up primarily of local talent, thrived. The NSWRL had resisted the move for a team in Queensland for years but created the Broncos and the Gold Coast-Tweed Giants the very next season.

The admission of the Bears had a deleterious effect on the QAFL which weakened over the following years.

During this era, few local players, besides Jason Dunstall, were produced with the exception of Gavin Crosisca and Marcus Ashcroft who were successful at VFL level.

Demographic trends saw Victorian and South Australians (states where the code is extremely popular) migrating interstate in large numbers to Queensland. Support for Australian rules football grew, despite a lack of success from the Bears and support from fans.

=== 1990s: AFL comes to Brisbane, New Governing Body ===
1990 saw the Brisbane Bears receive their first Wooden Spoon, which saw new coach Queensland-born Norm Dare sacked at the end of the season.

1991 was a mixed year for the Brisbane Bears. At the end of the home and away season, the Bears' Seniors team would receive the Wooden Spoon again while the Bears' Reserves team finished in 3rd position. They qualified for the Reserves Grand Final, where they scored a 34-point victory over the Melbourne Demons to become the first team from outside Victoria to win an AFL premiership. The Queensland Independent Schools Australian Football League (QISAFL) began in 1991, the first dedicated league for private schools in the state.

1992 saw the debut for the Brisbane Bears of the most significant locally produced young talent to emerge from the state – Michael Voss. Although born in country Victoria, Voss spent most of his childhood in Queensland and represented the state at junior level where he shone, before going on to captaining the Brisbane Lions and becoming one of the all-time greats of the game. Voss was followed by a small number of players from Queensland to find their way into the newly named Australian Football League (AFL).

In 1993, the Brisbane Bears moved from the Gold Coast, to the Brisbane Cricket Ground in the inner-Brisbane suburb of Woolloongabba. Interest, crowds and membership in the team increased considerably. Games between the Bears and popular Victorian sides Collingwood, Essendon and Hawthorn drew particular interest.

In 1995, the Bears made the AFL finals for the first time.

In 1996, six sell-out games at the Gabba caused the State Government to consider funding re-development of the ground, something that would be done several times over the following years to transform the small stadium into a world-class venue.

After the 1996 season, the QAFL, having weakened significantly with the introduction of the Bears, finally went into receivership. A new governing body, the Queensland Australian Football Council, was formed in 1997, alongside a new premiership competition, Queensland State Football League (QSFL).

==== Boom Times: Brisbane Lions Threepeat Era ====
The Brisbane Lions began in 1996, when the AFL approved a merger between the Brisbane Bears and the formerly Melbourne based Fitzroy Football Club and on-field success increased substantially with the injection of Fitzroy players, further boosting the popularity of the code.

A major breakthrough for was participation by GPS schools in South East Queensland playing the code for the first time since the turn of the century. Previously to this, South East Queensland private schools had been a staunchly rugby union stronghold and many schools did not allow Australian Football to be played as it would compete with rugby for players. John Stackpoole introduced Australian rules to GPS school Nudgee College in 1998, the school was to become a powerhouse in the Independent Schools competition. The Jason Dunstall Cup (senior competition named after champion ACGS product Jason Dunstall) and Clint Bizzel Cup (year 9 named after BBC product Clint Bizzell) was later awarded to the champion school. In subsequent decades all of the prestigious GPS schools (with the exception of St Joseph's Gregory Terrace): Nudgee, BBC, ACGS, Brisbane Grammar, Ipswich Grammar and The Southport School participated at one stage or another in the first division of the Queensland Independent Schools Australian Football League (QISAFL) (Toowoomba Grammar competed in a Darling Downs division of the competition). During these years of competition, it became a nursery for AFL players. However, the competition struggled to maintain interest in the schools and unlike rugby (and soccer in 1991) it has never become an official Great Public Schools Association of Queensland sport. Many AFL players who attended independent schools, notably: Jason Dunstall, Chris Scott, Jason Akermanis, Clint Bizzell, Clark Keating, Brad Moran, Nick Riewoldt, Steven Lawrence, Tom Williams, Marcus Allan, Scott Clouston and John Williams never had the opportunity to play for their school.

Also in the 1990s, the Cairns league experienced enormous growth financially on the back of gaming, with the Cazaly's social club quickly becoming the largest sporting club north of Brisbane. The Cazaly's Stadium received lights to play popular night football games and the western stand from the Gabba was transplanted to Cazaly's Stadium, enabling it to host AFL matches.

In 1999, the QSFL also went into voluntary liquidation, being replaced by a new organisation, AFL Queensland (AFLQ) in 2000. The new premiership competition was called the AFLQ State League. That year, Nick Riewoldt became the first Queensland produced player to be taken as number 1 pick in the AFL draft, recognised as the best junior talent in the nation.

In 2001, a Women's Footy competition began in earnest.

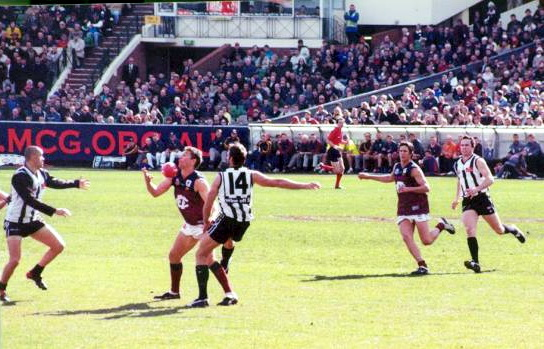
Brisbane Lions playing in Melbourne wearing the 1968 to 1973 Fitzroy jumper for the 2003 heritage round

Three successive premierships for the Brisbane Lions in 2001, 2002 and 2003 saw crowds to Australian Football League matches in Brisbane to grow to an average of over 30,000, and in terms of attendance and membership, the AFL team in 2003 was the most popular team of any football code in the state. However, despite increasing television ratings and media exposure, Australian rules football remains overall less popular than league and union in the state.

During the Lions premiership years, junior Aussie Rules numbers exploded in South East Queensland, and grew solidly right across the state.

=== 2000s: Period of Stabilisation ===
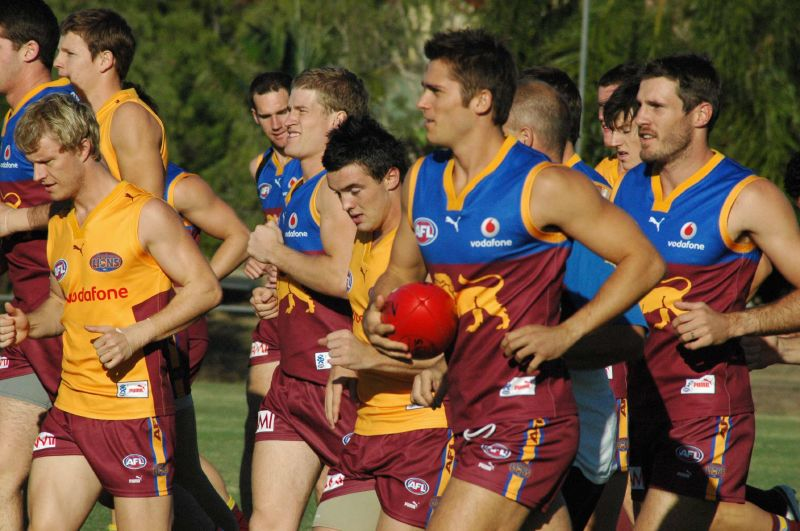
Brisbane Lions players in training in 2007

From 2005, the growing local State League expanded to two divisions.

A record number of 13 Queenslanders were invited to attend the 2006 AFL draft camp, representing 18% of the 72 camp invitees.

Although state league crowds have dwindled with the increase in support for the Brisbane Lions AFL team, a healthy crowd of 3,257 saw the Southport Sharks defeat Morningside in the 2005 AFLQ Grand Final at the Gabba, while a crowd of over 3,000 saw the Southport Sharks win back-to-back premierships in 2006 at Carrara.

In 2006, support for the Brisbane Lions waned substantially due to two successive seasons out of the finals. From 2005 to 2006 total memberships decreased from 30,027 to 26,429 and the average home crowd fell from 33,101 to 28,305.

The impact of the Brisbane Lions fall from grace was felt at grassroots level by the sport in Brisbane. From 2006, the much celebrated Jason Dunstall Cup was no longer contested by its former powerhouse schools – ACGS or BBC. Most other major private schools ceased playing the sport at the top level. Despite the decline of school competitions, local junior club numbers continued to grow.

Nevertheless, Queensland performed extremely well in the 2006 AFL draft with a record 11 recruits, including 8 of the first 32 picks. Surprisingly, the majority of the movement was in the regional areas, with some picks from previously undrafted regional areas such as Townsville, Toowoomba and Mackay providing AFL talent.

In 2019, the Associated Independent Colleges began participating, with such Brisbane and Ipswich schools as St Laurence's, St Patrick's, Marist College Ashgrove, Villanova, Padua College, Iona College and St Edmund's College, Ipswich which had previously only played rugby and soccer. Marist College had been competing informally on and off against other private schools, and kickstarted the careers of such players as Charlie Cameron and Lachlan Keeffe however this new competition provided the opportunity for regular competition between the schools for the first time.

==== AFL on the Gold Coast ====
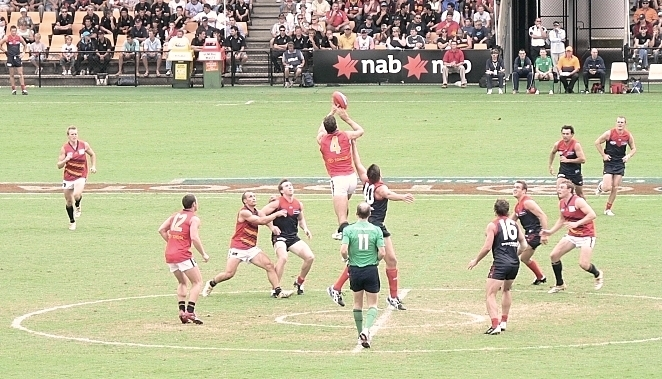
Australian football at Carrara Stadium on the Gold Coast: Adelaide vs Melbourne, 2006

The Gold Coast, where a hole had been left once the Brisbane Bears moved away, had grown to become the 6th biggest urban area with nearly half a million people, many of which had migrated from states where Australian Rules is popular. Several bids were made for a new AFL franchise by the powerhouse Southport Sharks Australian Football Club, including attempts to lure a Melbourne-based club in 2004. Many of these attempts were knocked back due to the city's many failed sporting franchises. However demographic trends suggested a growing demand for Australian rules football and in 2005 a pre-season practice match between the Brisbane Lions and Essendon drew a healthy audience of 16,591. Following the match, the Australian Football League stepped up efforts to expand into the Gold Coast market. A series of pre-season games and a home and away match was scheduled at Carrara for 2006. In response, the rival NRL competition admitted a Gold Coast Titans franchise. Despite an average crowd of around 10,000 (comparatively low by AFL standards), the AFL officially announced a strategy to include a Gold Coast side in the next 5 years. A bitter turf war with the National Rugby League resulted over the use of Carrara stadium. In the same year, AFL CEO Andrew Demetriou was quoted to declare that the league would compete directly with the NRL for marketshare in Queensland.

In July 2006, with the backing of the local government and the AFL, the Kangaroos did a deal which saw them move their home games scheduled at Manuka Oval in Canberra to play a number of home games at Carrara Stadium on the Gold Coast in 2007. The AFL began a heavily subsidised grassroots participation program and pushed for the number of AFL games, including pre-season matches to steadily increase to ready the region for its own side. Relocation of the Kangaroos was seen by many to be the safest option for the AFL, and an existing Queensland Government deal prevented use of the Brisbane Cricket Ground for a second Queensland side until 2010. The AFL's plans were further complicated by growing competition in the market. The entry of several licences from other sports into the market as well as the proposed expansion of A-League put additional pressure on the league to fast-track the relocation of the Kangaroos.

In December 2007, after two years of resisting the AFL's push for their relocation, the Kangaroos finally officially rejected the AFL's $100 million proposal. This was despite threats from the league to pull financial assistance from the club and cancel the Gold Coast home game agreement if they don't move. The failure of the AFL to secure a stadium deal for Carrara with the Queensland Government was seen as one of the deciding factors. A consortium was selected by the AFL in early 2008 and the GC17 set out to make an official bid for the licence with criteria defined by the league. The Queensland government finally committed to funding for a stadium in early 2009 after which the AFL was granted a provisional licence pending further federal government funding. In 2010 The Gold Coast Suns were created and entered a team in the NEAFL and in 2011 they made their debut playing in the AFL. During the fanfare of their debut AFL season their home attendance of 22,075 was higher than both the NRL Titans (15,428) and the Gold Coast United FC (3,416) however all three codes would later struggle to attract and audience.

In 2018 it passed rugby union in player and child playing numbers for the first time since the 1890s.

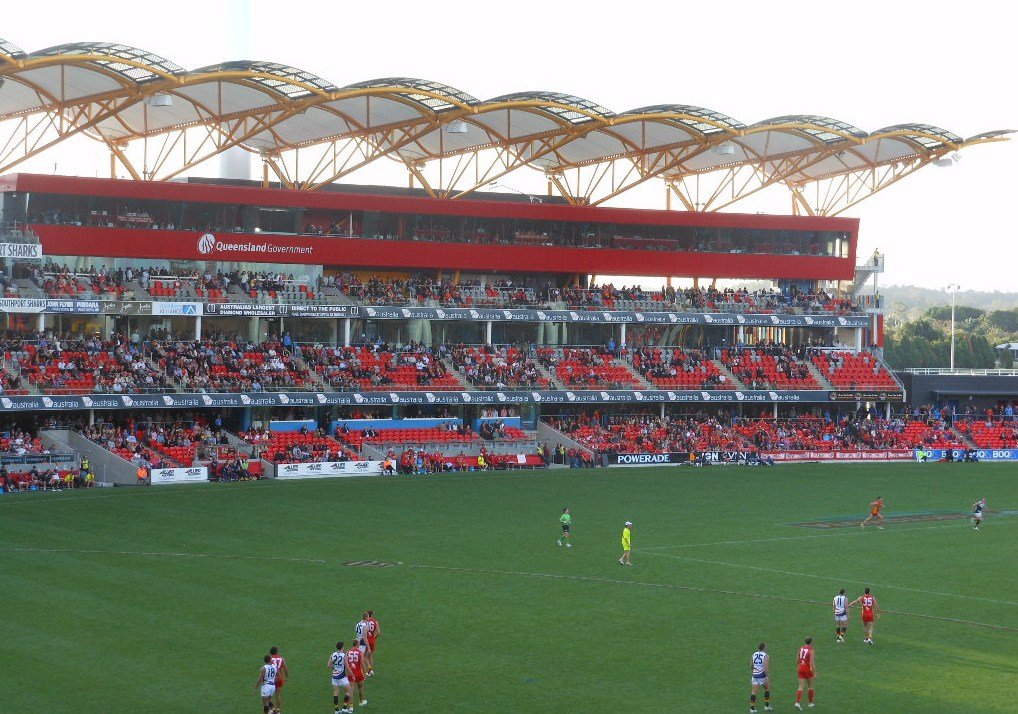
Gold Coast vs Adelaide at Carrara Stadium in 2011

=== 2020s: COVID Impacts on Queensland football ===
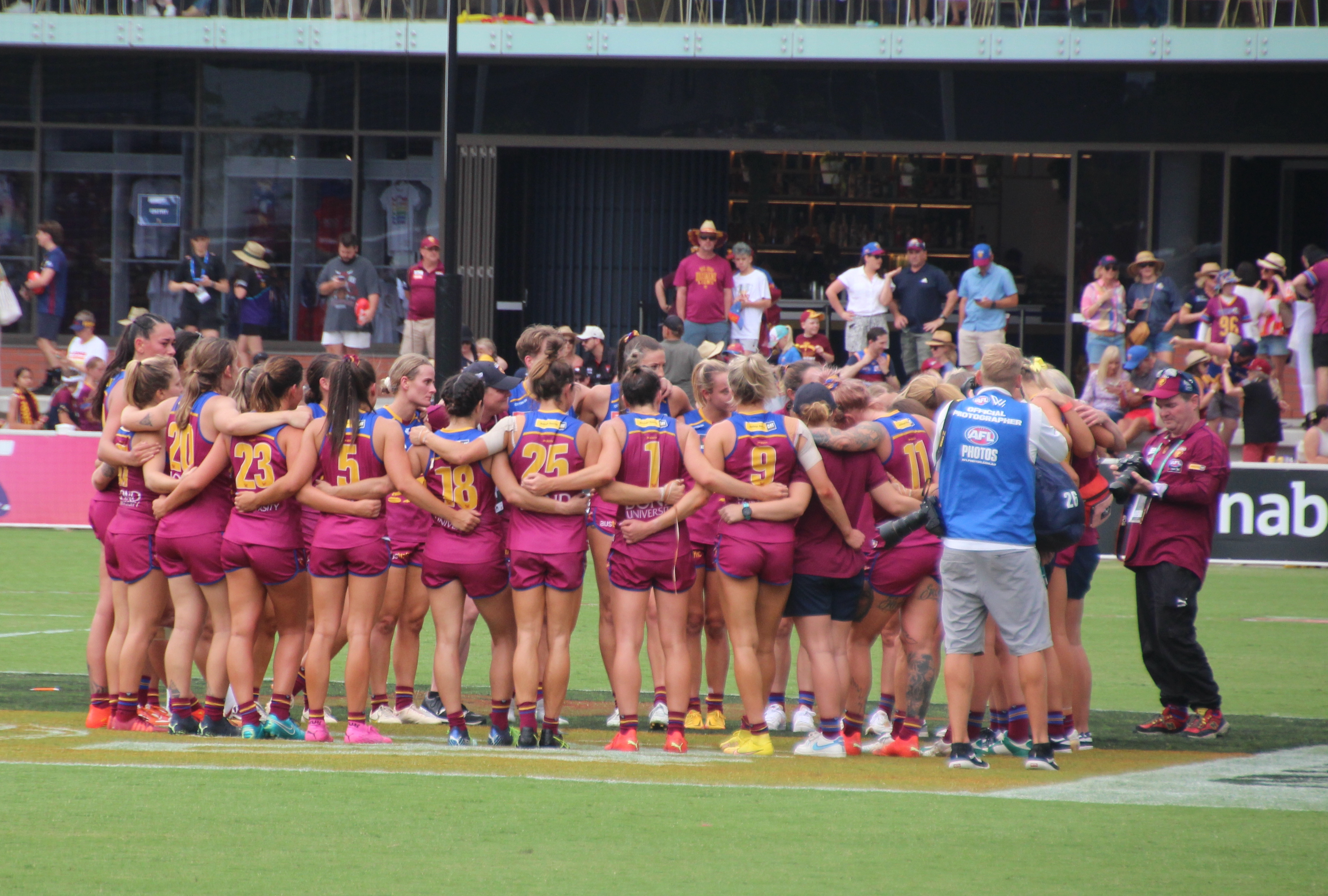
Brisbane Lions AFLW team during the S7 Grand Final at the newly opened Springfield Stadium 2022

Queensland was the first state other than Victoria to host an AFL Grand Final, the 2020 AFL Grand Final held at the Brisbane Cricket Ground.

Apart from affecting the availability of AFL venues, the COVID-19 pandemic had an overall positive effect on the sport in Queensland, both in terms of AFL clubs being based in the state and grassroots participation. At one stage in the 2020 season, all but three AFL clubs (the two South Australian clubs, and Hawthorn) were based in the state.

AFL venues have seen significant recent investment during this time, including the $70 million development of a new AFLW stadium at The Reserve, Springfield, $2.7 million expansion of the Maroochydore Multi Sports Complex.

The first Australian Football International Cup tournament scheduled to be hosted outside of Victoria (on the Sunshine Coast) was cancelled due to COVID, the Maroochydore complex will instead host the 2024 Pacific Cup.

== Competitions ==
Underneath the professional AFL, there are several semi-professional leagues with Queensland clubs. Between 2011 and 2020 Queensland based teams have competed in the northern division of the North East Australian Football League (NEAFL, also contested by teams from New South Wales, Northern Territory and Australian Capital Territory). This competition became the second tier for Queensland-based clubs. Some of these clubs later joined the VFL. The Queensland Australian Football League (former "AFLQ State League", first started in 1903) remains the premier semi-professional club competition based in Queensland.

=== Club Competitions ===
Locations of regional governing bodies with active competitions

==== Men's ====
Active competition

League	Years with QLD clubs	Senior QLD clubs	Divisions	Headquarters	Notes
Toowoomba Football Association	1876–1886	4	1	Toowoomba	Queensland's first football association. Affiliated with the QFA/VFA in 1880 as the Darling Downs Football Association. Switched to rugby in 1887
Queensland Football Association (1880-1890)	1880–1890	19	1	Brisbane	Folded
Queensland Australian Football League	1903–	12	2: Seniors; Reserves	Brisbane	
Cooroy National Football League	1951–54	3	1	Cooroy	
AFL Townsville	1955–	5	2: Seniors; Reserves	Townsville	
AFL Cairns	1955–	10	3: Seniors, Development; Division 3	Cairns	
Gold Coast Australian Football League	1961–1996	11	1	Gold Coast	Competition absorbed into expanded QAFL and AFLQ State Association
AFL Mount Isa	1967–	3	1: Seniors	Mount Isa	
Queensland Football Association	1969–	52	7: Seniors (4); Reserves (3)	Brisbane	Known by a variety of different names including SQAFA, SEQ AFL, QAFA and Brisbane AFL. Renamed QFA in 2021
AFL Capricornia	1969–	6	2: Seniors; Reserves	Rockhampton	
AFL Mackay	1970–	6	2: Seniors; Reserves	Mackay	
Sunshine Coast Australian Football League	1970–1992	14	1	Sunshine Coast	Competition absorbed into expanded QAFL and AFLQ State Association
AFL Darling Downs	1971–	8	1: Seniors	Toowoomba	
Bundaberg Australian Football League	1972–1986	12	1	Bundaberg	Merged with Wide Bay AFL to become AFL Wide Bay
NFL Night Series	1979	2	1	Melbourne, Victoria	Discontinued
Maryborough Australian Football League	1981–1983	5	1	Maryborough	Folded
Central Highlands Australian Football League	1983–1997	8	1	Emerald	Folded
Wide Bay Australian Football League	1985–1987	6	1	Hervey Bay	Merged with Bundaberg AFL to become AFL Wide Bay
AFL Masters Queensland	1984–	32	5: 35s (2); 45s (2); Mixed	Brisbane	
AFL Wide Bay	1987–	4	2: Seniors; Reserves	Bundaberg	
Australian Football League	1987–	2	1	Melbourne, Victoria	Brisbane Lions and Gold Coast Suns combined membership was 89,429 in 2024
North East Australian Football League	2011–2020	9	1	Sydney, New South Wales	Folded Foxtel Cup
League Championship Cup	2011–2014	5	1	Melbourne, Victoria	Discontinued
QFA (Northern Rivers)	2012–2021	–	1	Byron Bay	In New South Wales but governed by AFL Queensland. Folded
Victorian Football League	2020–	3	1: Seniors	Melbourne, Victoria	

==== Women's leagues ====
Active competition

League	Years with QLD clubs	Senior QLD clubs	Divisions	Headquarters	Notes
QAFLW	2001–	8	1: Seniors	Brisbane	
AFL Cairns Women's	2002–	6	1: Seniors	Cairns	
AFL Capricornia Women's	2010–	6	1: Seniors	Rockhampton	
AFL Darling Downs Women's	2013–	6	1: Seniors	Toowoomba	
QFAW	2017–	21	6: Seniors (4); Reserves (2)	Brisbane	
AFL Mackay Women's	2017–	7	1: Seniors	Mackay	
AFL Women's	2017–	2	1: Seniors	Melbourne, Victoria	
AFL Townsville Women's	2019–	5	1: Seniors	Townsville	
AFL Wide Bay Women's	2022–	5	1: Seniors	Bundaberg	
Isa Women's	2022–2023	2	1: Seniors	Mount Isa	
AFL Masters Queensland Women's	2023–	12	2: Seniors; Mixed	Brisbane	

==== Junior ====
Active competition

League	Years with QLD clubs	QLD clubs	Divisions	Headquarters	Notes
Australian Football State School Premiership Competition	1926–?			Brisbane	
AFL Cairns Juniors	1955–	8	Mixed: U8-U13; M: U15-U17; F: U15-U17	Cairns	
AFL Brisbane Juniors	1957–2022			Brisbane	Merged into AFL SEQ Juniors in 2022
AFL Gold Coast Juniors	1970–2022			Gold Coast	Merged into AFL SEQ Juniors in 2022
AFL Sunshine Coast Juniors	2005–2022			Sunshine Coast	Merged into AFL SEQ Juniors in 2022
AFL Mount Isa Juniors	2020–2023			Mt Isa	Folded
AFL Darling Downs Juniors	2003–	4	Mixed: U8-U14; M: U17; F: U17	Toowoomba	
AFL Capricornia Juniors	2005–	6	Mixed: U9-U13; M: U11-U17; F: U11-U16	Rockhampton	
AFL Mackay Juniors	2015–	5	Mixed: U12-U14; M: U17; F: None	Mackay	
AFL Wide Bay Juniors	2012–	4	Mixed: U12-U14; M: U17; F: None	Bundaberg	
AFL Cape York Juniors	1992–	1	M: U16-U17; F: U16-U17	Weipa	Fields a representative side in the AFL Cairns comp
Queensland Independent Schools Australian Football League (QISAFL)	1991–2021	7	1	Brisbane	AIS schools formed their own competition and Great Public Schools Association of Queensland decided collectively to abandon their participation
AFL National Championships	2017–	2	4: M: U16, U18; F: U16, U18	Melbourne, Victoria	
Associated Independent Colleges (AIS) First XVIII	2019–	7	1	Brisbane	
Talent League	2019–	2	4: M: U16, U18; F: U16, U18	Melbourne, Victoria	
AFL SEQ Juniors	2022–	132	47: Mixed: U8-U13; M: U15-U17; F: U9-U17	Brisbane	
AFLQ Schools Cup	2016–	10	M: U11-U18; F: U11-U18	Brisbane	
Queensland Girls' Secondary Schools Sports Association (QGSSSA)	2024–	10	1	Brisbane	

== Clubs ==
There are two fully professional football clubs in Queensland, the Brisbane Lions and the Gold Coast Suns who both play in the main national league, the Australian Football League (AFL). They also play (with reserve teams) in the interstate competition North East Australian Football League. Other teams from the region that take part of it are Aspley, Redland and Southport.

The main competition of Queensland, Queensland Australian Football League, has 9 teams participating of it.

== Representative Sides ==
=== Men's ===
The Queensland state team, known as the "Maroons" has played interstate representative matches against all other Australian states, as well as selecting State of Origin teams as both Queensland. Queensland's last open appearance was in the 1988 Adelaide Bicentennial Carnival where it lost to Tasmania. In 1993 the after taking over as governing body the AFL Commission merged Queensland with the Northern Territory to create a composite side before disbanding it altogether.

Queensland debuted in 1884 at Queens Park following pressure from rugby members of the QFA to play annual representative matches and the result was a drawn series against New South Wales. After rugby split from the QFA and held its annual NSW vs QLD matches, the team did not regularly compete however in 1888 and 1890 suffered humiliating defeats at the hands of the first visiting Victorian teams. Following this, Queensland was reluctant to compete against the stronger states, and resumed tests with NSW until the Jubilee Australasian Football Carnival in 1908. Queensland sent a team to carnival performing a stirring aboriginal war cry prior to its matches against New Zealand however the team performed poorly, failing to win a game. Its carnival record since has been poor, and it has never won a senior carnival in either division.

=== Uniforms ===
Queensland	Queensland/N.T.

==== Test Matches ====
===== Colony of Queensland (Pre-Federation) =====
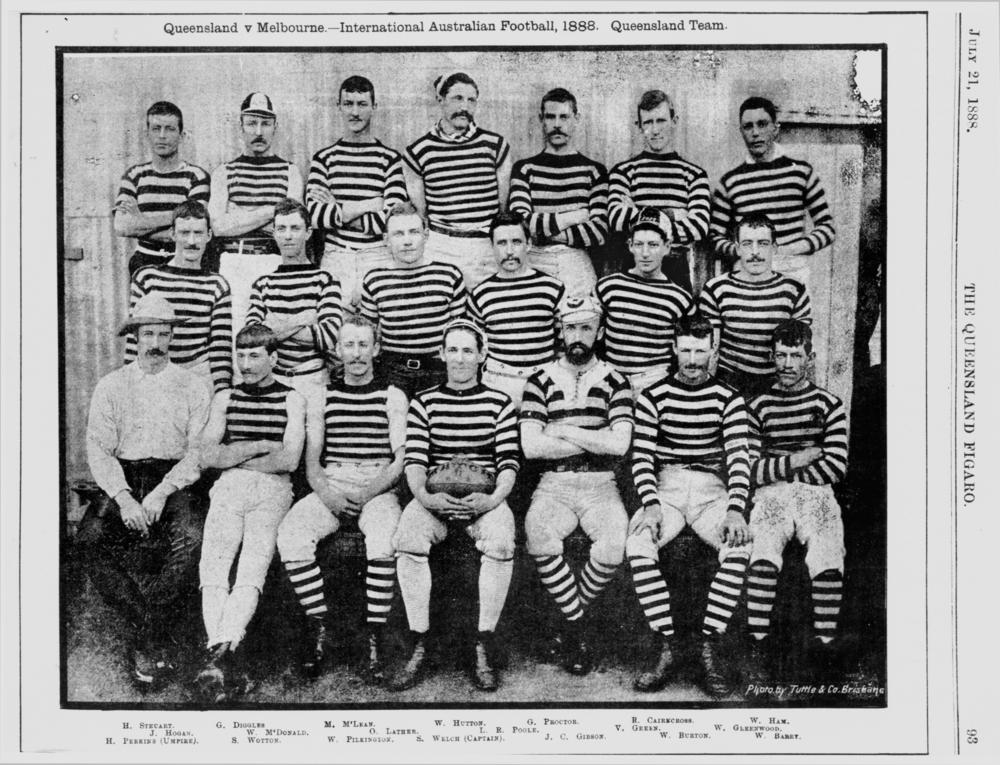
The Queensland state team who played Melbourne in 1888

Date	Location	Result	Attendance
20 August 1884	Queens Park	Queensland drew New South Wales	300
30 August 1884	Albert Sports Ground	Queensland 3 def New South Wales 2	2,000
19 June 1886	Sydney Cricket Ground	New South Wales 4 def Queensland 1	1,200
26 June 1886	Sydney Cricket Ground	New South Wales 9 def Queensland 1	1,000

===== State Team (Post-Federation) =====
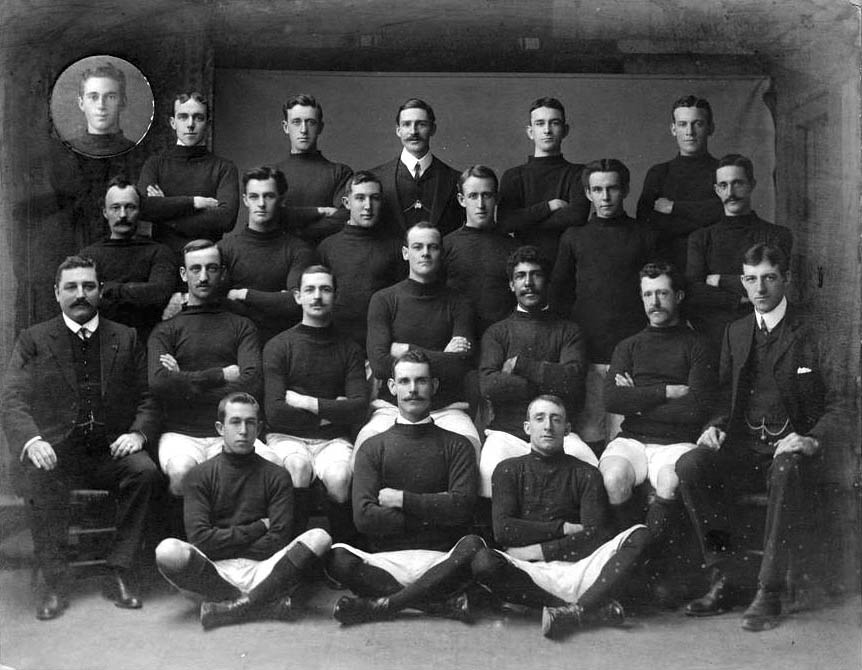
Queensland representative team of 1906–07

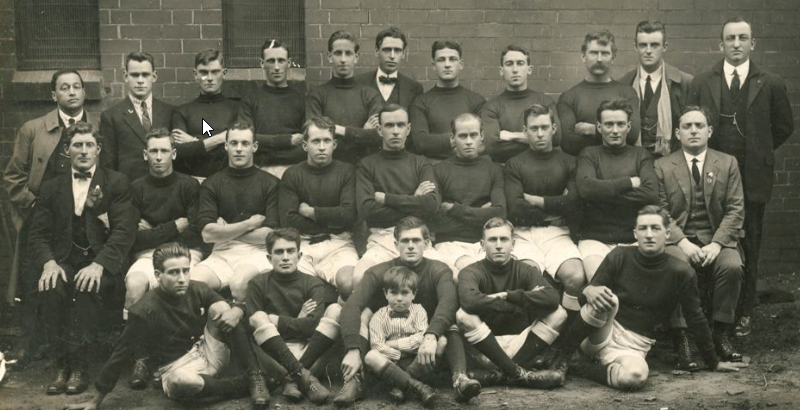
Queensland's team that toured Sydney in 1920

3 September 1904	Brisbane Exhibition Ground	Queensland 4.15 (39) def New South Wales 3.13(31)	3.000
14 August 1905	Brisbane Exhibition Ground	Queensland 10.16(76) def New South Wales 9.7(61)	2,000
15 August 1905	Brisbane Exhibition Ground	Queensland 9.11(59) def New South Wales 7.7(49)	
23 June 1906	Sydney Cricket Ground	New South Wales 11.10(76) def Queensland 3.5(23)	6,000
13 July 1907	Brisbane Exhibition Ground	Queensland 9.22(76) def New South Wales 6.4(40)	8,000
15 July 1907	North Ipswich Reserve	Queensland 2.10(22) def. by New South Wales 8.6(54)	
4 September 1909	Brisbane Exhibition Ground	Queensland 11.12(87) def New South Wales 6.10(46)	
12 June 1910	Brisbane Cricket Ground	Queensland 5.7(37) def. by New South Wales 9.15(69)	
20 August 1910		Queensland 8.12(60) def. by New South Wales 10.5(65)	
25 August 1910	Erskineville Oval	Queensland 83 def Riverina 80	
17 August 1912	Alexandria Oval	New South Wales 19.22(136) def Queensland 12.9(81)	1,500
7 June 1913	Brisbane Cricket Ground	Queensland 7.10(52) def. by New South Wales 9.15(69)	
5 August 1914	Sydney Cricket Ground	New South Wales 13.15(93) def Queensland 2.4(16)	
11 July 1921	Brisbane Exhibition Ground	Queensland 14.16(100) def New South Wales 11.10(76)	
13 July 1921	North Ipswich Reserve	Queensland (65) def. by New South Wales (128)	
16 July 1921	Brisbane Exhibition Ground	Queensland 12.13(85) def New South Wales 9.11(65)	
2 June 1934	Perry Park	Queensland 13.15(93) def. by New South Wales 13.15(93)	
4 June 1934	Perry Park	Queensland 11.16(82) def. by New South Wales 13.15(93)	
18 August 1934	Sydney Cricket Ground	New South Wales 17.14(116) def Queensland 12.10(82)	
26 May 1947	Trumper Oval	New South Wales 17.13(115) def Queensland 15.17(107)	
30 July 1948	Brisbane Exhibition Ground	Queensland 17.13(115) def Queensland 16.18(114)	
30 July 1949	Sydney Cricket Ground	New South Wales 16.14(110) def Queensland 8.15(63)	

====== Interstate Carnivals ======
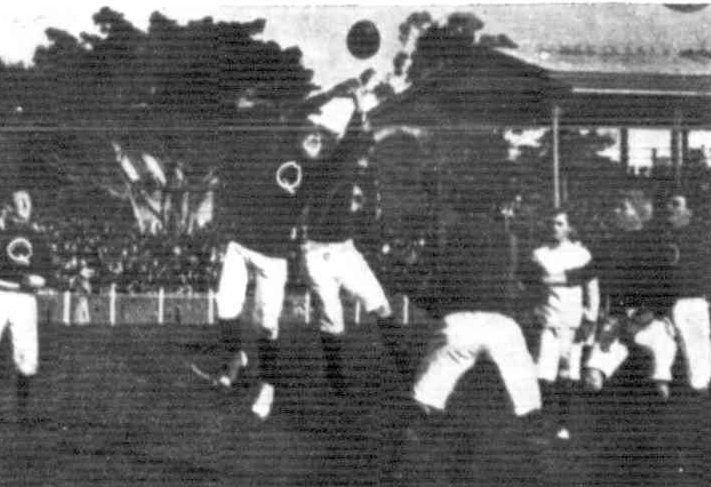
Queensland marking high against Tasmania at the 1908 Jubilee Carnival

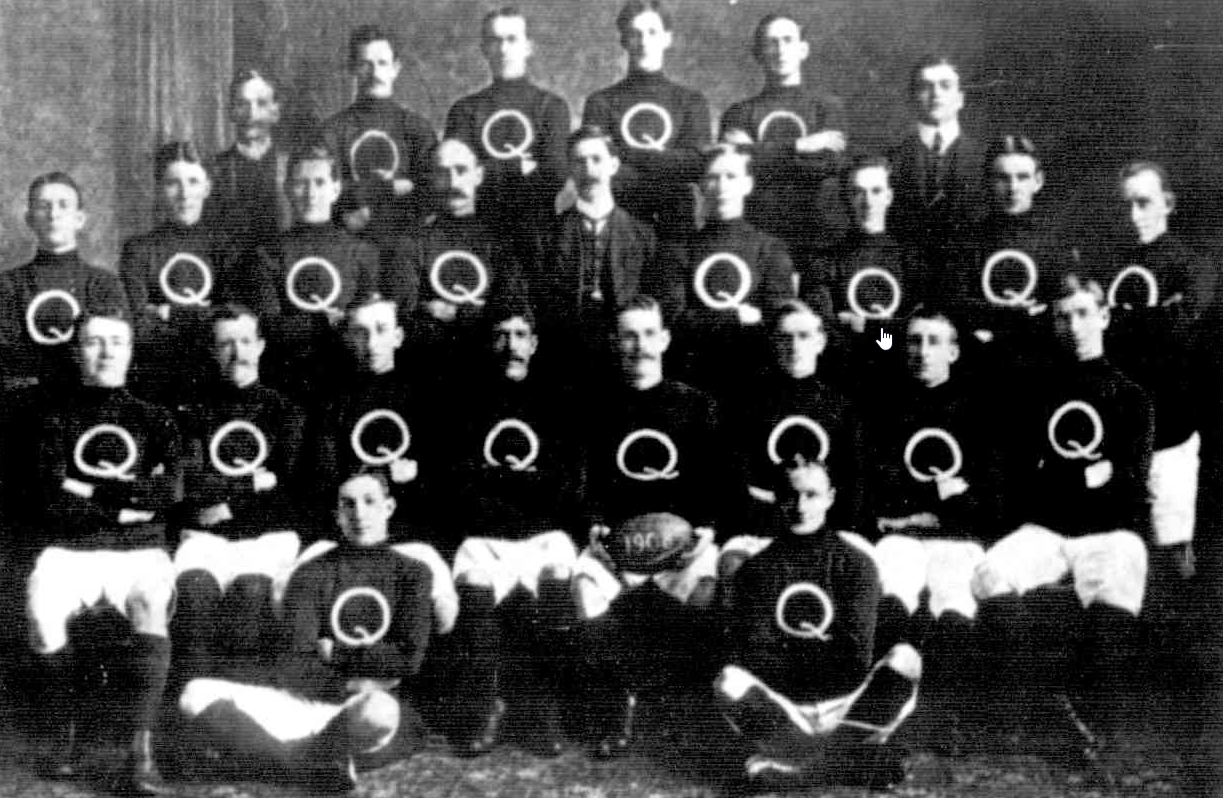
Queensland Jubilee Carnival team 1908

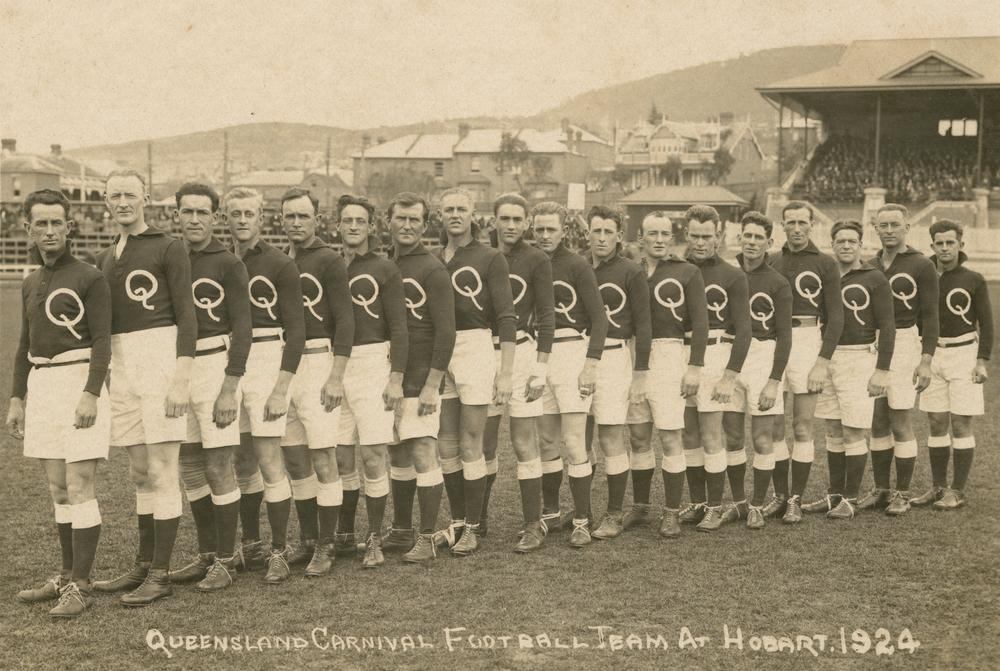
Queensland team at the Hobart Carnival 1924

In early carnivals Queensland only made rare appearances. It broke its 20-game carnival losing streak in 1933 when it defeated the Australian Capital Territory. This was followed up by another win against the ACT in 1947 and 1950. Queensland achieved a breakthrough when it defeated New South Wales for the first time in the 1958 carnival. However, in the 1960s it was relegated to the "minor states" where it again accounted for New South Wales at the 1968 Minor States Carnival and both New South Wales and ACT at the 1974 Minor States Carnival taking its first Section 2 title. It was not to reappear in the national carnival until the 1979 Perth State of Origin Carnival when it once again accounted for the Australian Capital Territory and claimed the title. It made its last senior appearance at the 1993 State of Origin Championships as a combined Queensland-NT team defeat Tasmania and take out the Section Two title. With the AFL Commission taking over the game nationally it created a concept in which Queenslanders would compete under the banner of the AFL's The Allies along with players from New South Wales, Tasmania, Australian Capital Territory and Northern Territory and the AFL's focus on its national club competition effectively saw the end of Queensland players representing their state of origin.

- 1908 Melbourne Carnival – 0 wins
- 1914 Sydney Carnival – 0 wins
- 1924 Hobart Carnival – 0 wins
- 1930 Adelaide Carnival – 0 wins
- 1933 Sydney Carnival – 1 win
- 1947 Hobart Carnival – 1 win
- 1950 Brisbane Carnival – 1 win
- 1958 Melbourne Carnival – 1 win
- 1960 Minor States Carnival – 0 win
- 1968 Minor States Carnival – 1 win
- 1974 Minor States Carnival – 2 wins
- 1988 Adelaide Bicentennial Carnival – 0 wins

====== State of Origin ======
Originally led by Subiaco marketing manager Leon Larkin in 1977, interstate matches involving Queensland in the late 1980s and early 1990s were regularly played under state-of-origin rules as opposed to the state-of-league rules that were previously used. This rule change allowed the Queensland state team to select higher quality players of Queensland origin that were playing in the Victorian Football League such as the Brisbane born and raised duo of Australian Football Hall of Famer Jason Dunstall and Collingwood premiership player Gavin Crosisca. Both players competed for Queensland in their famous victory against Victoria at the Gabba in 1991.

3 March 1988	Football Park	Victoria VFA 17.10 (112) def Queensland 4.11 (45)	–
4 March 1988	Norwood Oval	Tasmania 11.16 (82) def Queensland 10.10 (70)	–
16 July 1991	The Gabba	Queensland 23.14 (152) def Victoria 15.8 (108)	8,519
12 May 1992	Sydney Cricket Ground	New South Wales 22.9 (141) def Queensland 6.12 (48)	7,223
6 June 1993	Bellerive Oval	Queensland 16.14 (110) def Tasmania 6.12 (48)	9,660

===== Captains =====
Name	Years as captain
George Henry Pritchard	1884
Ralph McKellar	1908
George Paget	1910
Leo O'Connor	1919–1922
Artie McCaul	1920s
A. Nicholson	1930
Clem Ryan	1930s (7 years)
Dick Parton	1946–1947
Tom Calder	1948
Doug Pittard	1949–1952
Tom Broadbent	1950s
Norm Reidy	1958
Alex McGill	1960
Dick Verdon	1961, 1965
Ken Grimley	1963–1964
Syd Guildford	1965
Lindsay Jacob	1970
Wayne Stewart	1971–1973
John Stackpoole	1970s (7 times)
Bill Ryan	1974–1975
Barry Roberts-Thomson	1977
Barry Clarke	1979 (1)
Mick Nolan	1983, 1984
Tony Beckett	1985
Kevin O'Keefe	1986
Zane Taylor	1987
Terry O'Neill	1988
Roger Merrett	1991
Craig Cowley	1991–1992 (1)
Jason Dunstall	1993 (2)

(1) Subject to State of Origin selection criteria (2) QLD/NT combined side

==== Inter-league competition ====
In inter-league matches since 1991, Queensland (QAFL) has defeated both Tasmania and the Australian Capital Territory, and has had some close games including a near-wins against Western Australia.

==== Regional Representative Sides ====
Also there are representative sides for areas within Queensland used during inter-league matches with-in Queensland itself. They include:

- North Queensland – represent North Queensland in annual matches against South Queensland since the 2010s
- South Queensland – represent Southern Queensland in annual matches against North Queensland since the 2010s
- Bushrangers – representing the entire South East Queensland region Official Site
- Gold Coast Stingrays – representing the Gold Coast region
- Suncoast Power – representing the Sunshine Coast region Official Site
- Western Taipans – representing the western regions, including the cities of Ipswich and Toowoomba. Official Site
- Northern Raiders – representing the Northern Suburbs of Brisbane and Bribie Island. Official Site

==== Underage teams ====
The Queensland Under-16, Under-17 and Under-18 representative sides are known as the Scorpions.

=== Women's ===
The state senior women's team is known as the "Sunfire" and competed since 1992 in the AFL Women's National Championship. It last competed in 2015 before the AFL took over the women's sport nationally and disbanded the senior women's championships. Its best results were in the 2001 AFL Women's National Championships and 2003 AFL Women's National Championships where it was named the second strongest women's team behind Victoria.

==== Girls ====
Queensland competes at Under 16, Under-17 and Under-18 representative level at the AFL Women's Under 18 Championships.

== Principal Venues ==
The following venues meet AFL Standard criteria and have been used to host AFL (National Standard) or AFLW level matches (Regional Standard).

The Gabba is the current main venue, however is set to be replaced by the Brisbane Stadium, currently under construction which when completed in 2032, will increase capacity to 63,000 seats.

Brisbane	Gold Coast	Cairns
Brisbane Cricket Ground	Carrara Stadium	Cazalys Stadium
Capacity: 37,478	Capacity: 25,000	Capacity: 13,500
Record: 37,478 (2019)	Record: 24,032 (2014)	Record: 11,197 (2013)
		Cazaly's Stadium
Townsville	Mackay	Ipswich
Riverway Stadium	Great Barrier Reef Arena	Springfield Central Stadium
Capacity: 10,000	Capacity: 10,000	Capacity: 8,000
Record: 7,243 (2013)	Record: 2,788 (2020)	Record: 7,512 (2022)
Moreton Bay	Gold Coast	Sunshine Coast
Moreton Bay Central Sports Complex	Fankhauser Reserve	Maroochydore Multi Sports Complex
Capacity: 8,000	Capacity: 8,000	Capacity: 5,000
Record: 6,200 (2016)	Record: 4,053 (2020)	Record: 5,147 (2012)
Moreton Bay Central Sports Complex	Fankhauser Reserve	Maroochydore Multi Sports Complex
Gold Coast
Bond Sports Park (Field 2)
Capacity: 3,000
Record: 1,419 (2022)

=== Historic Venues ===
- 1866 – ca 1890: Queen's Park (now part of the Brisbane City Botanic Gardens); the original Cricket Ground at the 'Green Hills' (now Petrie Terrace)
- 1904 – 1912: Queen's Park
- 1905 – 1914: Brisbane Cricket Ground, Exhibition Ground
- 1920 – 1950s: Perry Park, Exhibition Ground for some games, including the 1950 interstate carnival
- 1959 – 1971: Brisbane Cricket Ground
- 1970s – 1980s: Windsor Park
- 1987 – 1996: Carrara Stadium (Gold Coast)
- 1998 – 2004: Giffin Park

=== Modern AFL Standard Venues ===
- 2005 -: Brisbane Cricket Ground (City of Brisbane)
- 2005 -: Cazaly's Stadium (City of Cairns)
- 2010 -: Carrara Stadium (City of Gold Coast)
- 2017 -: South Pine Sports Complex (City of Moreton Bay)
- 2018 -: Moreton Bay Central Sports Complex (City of Moreton Bay)
- 2018 -: Great Barrier Reef Arena (City of Mackay)
- 2019 -: Riverway Stadium (City of Townsville)
- 2020 -: Maroochydore Multi Sports Complex, (Sunshine Coast)
- 2020 -: Fankhauser Reserve (City of Gold Coast)
- 2022 -: Bond Sports Park (Field 2) (City of Gold Coast)
- 2022 -: The Reserve, Springfield (City of Ipswich)

== Audience ==
=== Attendance record ===
- Men's: 37,473 (2019). AFL Brisbane Lions vs Richmond (Gabba, Brisbane)
- Women's: 15,610. (2017) AFLW Grand Final Brisbane Lions vs Adelaide (Metricon Stadium, Gold Coast, Queensland)

== Major Australian Rules Events in Queensland ==
- Australian Football League Premiership Season (Brisbane Lions and Gold Coast Suns home games and QClash special fixture)
- AFLW Premiership Season (Brisbane Lions and Gold Coast Suns home games)
- Queensland Australian Football League Grand Final

== Players ==
=== Participation ===
According to Ausplay in 2024 the participation rate per capita was 1.2%, down from 1.6% in 2022. There are 51,941 adults, just under half of which are female, and 30,563 children though only about a fifth of juniors are female. It is the seventh most participated team sport and fourth code of football after soccer, touch and rugby league.

Historically AFL Queensland has reported inflated participation figures, for example in 2017 it estimated more than 250,000 participants and that more than 40% were female, however official Australian government statistics and later AFL Queensland reports have cited less than a fifth of this total. AFL Queensland figures typically include players from northern New South Wales and participants in Auskick sessions which could not be classified as regular players.

Adult players
2007	2016	2017	2022-23	2023-24	2024-25
3,300	47,274	44,996	55,191	51,941	58,208

=== Past greats ===
Over the years, Queensland has produced an array of talent for elite leagues such as the Australian Football League.

Excluding current players, this list includes such players as Jason Dunstall, Marcus Ashcroft, Michael Voss, Gavin Crosisca, Scott McIvor, Simon Black, Jason Akermanis, Nick Riewoldt, Danny Dickfos, Mitch Hahn, Dayne Beams, David Hale, Sam Gilbert, Daniel Merrett, Che Cockatoo-Collins, Steven Lawrence, Clark Keating, Jamie Charman, Brett Voss, Brad Miller, Mal Michael, Ben Hudson, Matthew Kennedy, David Armitage, Robert Copeland, Dayne Beams, Kurt Tippett, Jarrod Harbrow, Tom Hickey and Charlie Dixon.

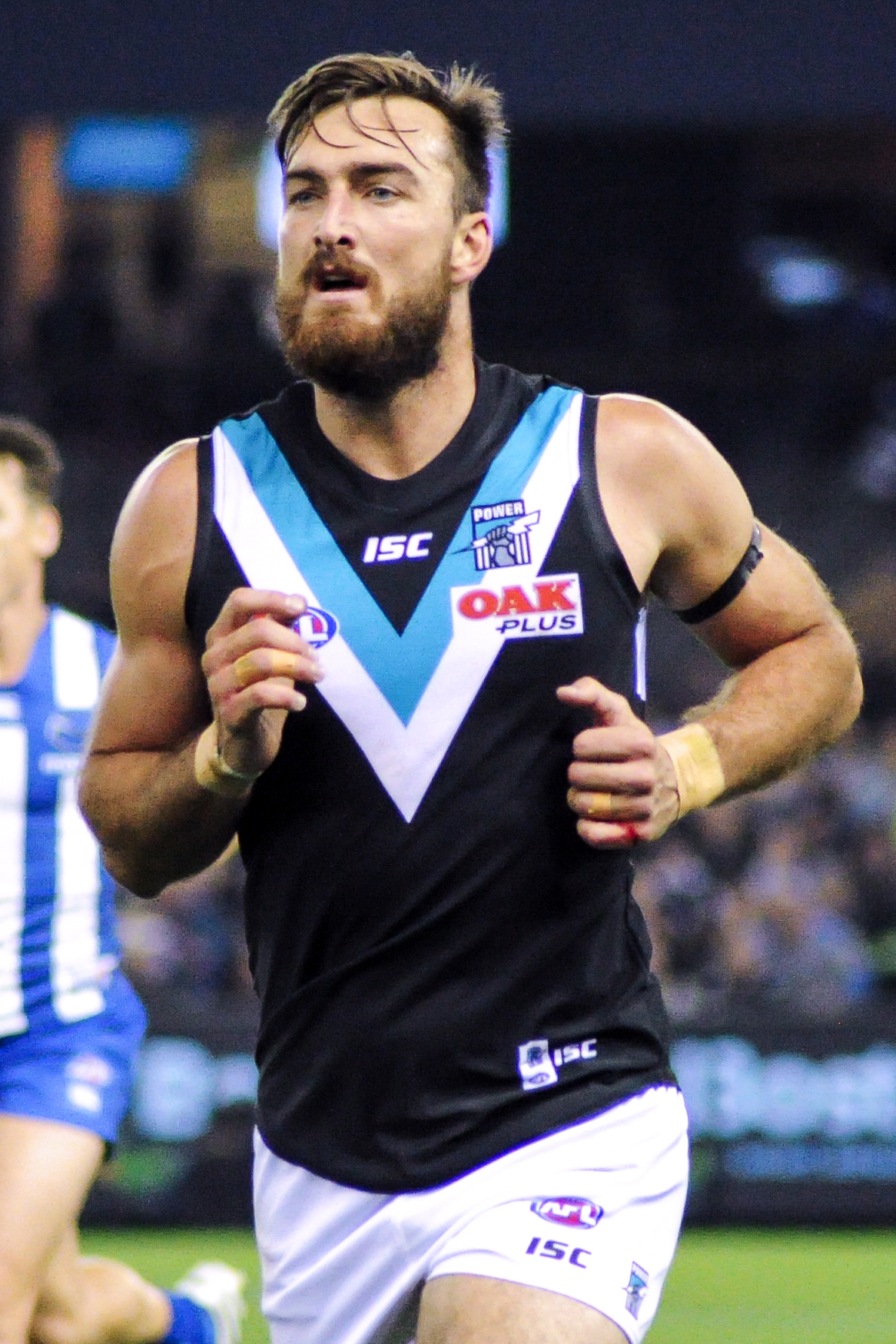
Charlie Dixon was from Cairns

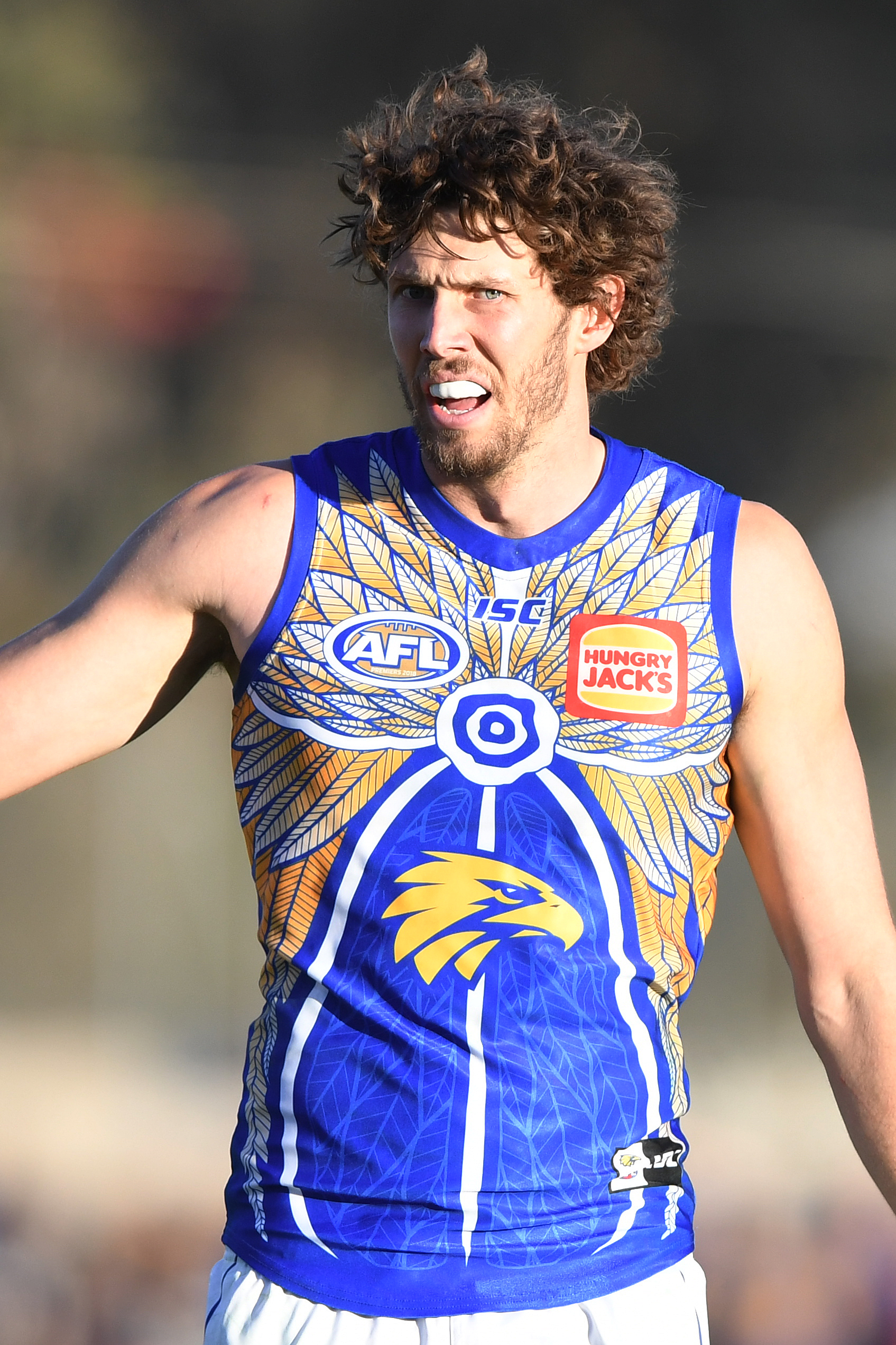
Tom Hickey was from Brisbane

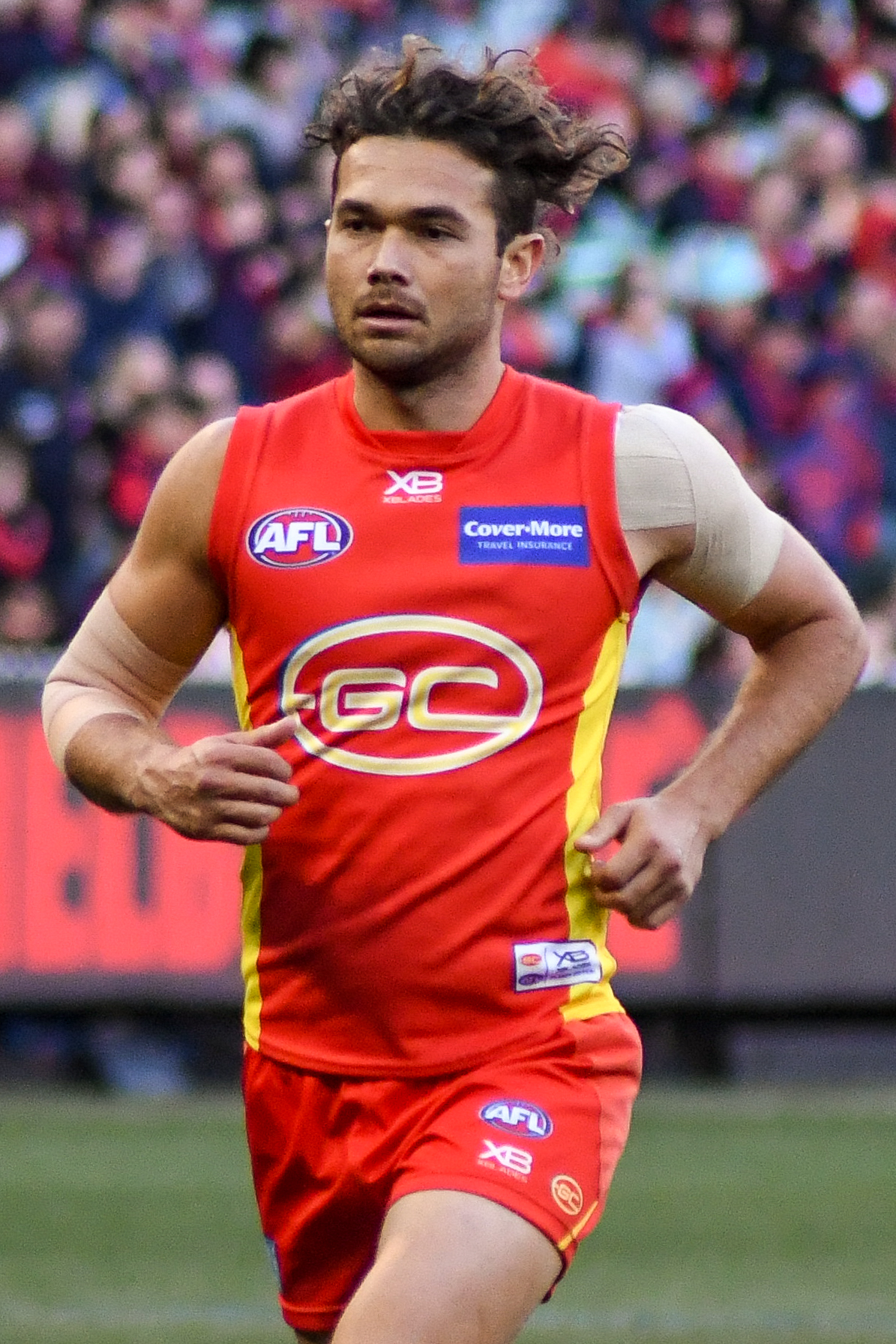
Jarrod Harbrow was from Cairns

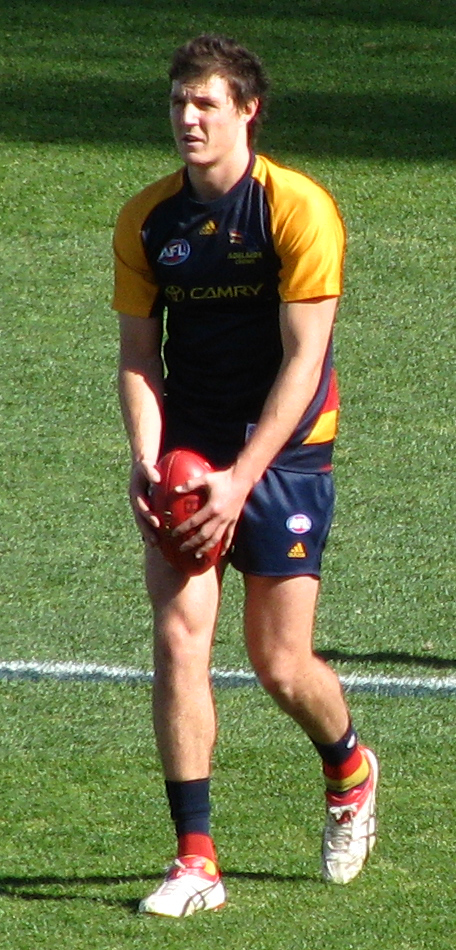
Kurt Tippett was from the Gold Coast

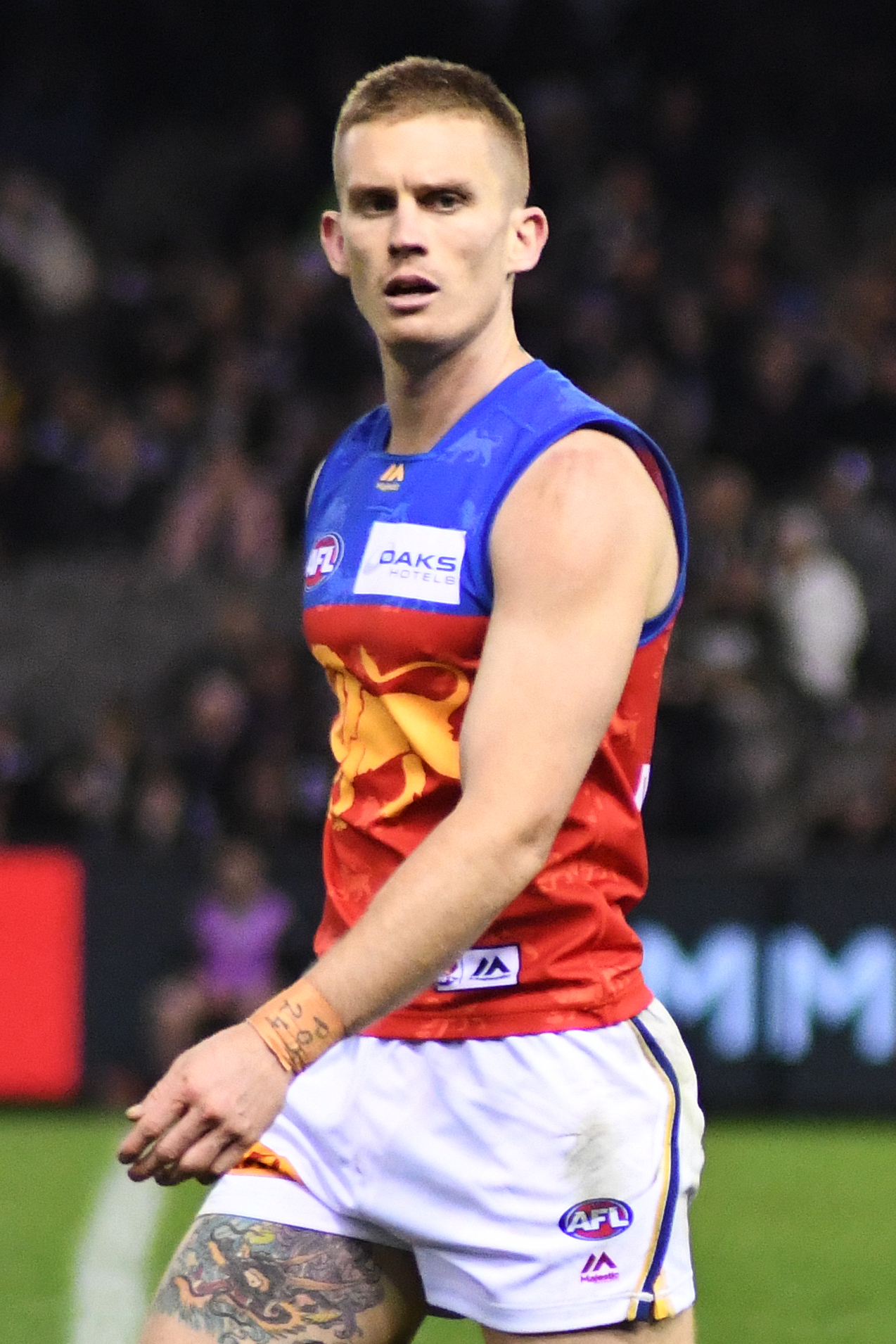
Dayne Beams 2010 AFL Premiership player with Collingwood was from the Gold Coast

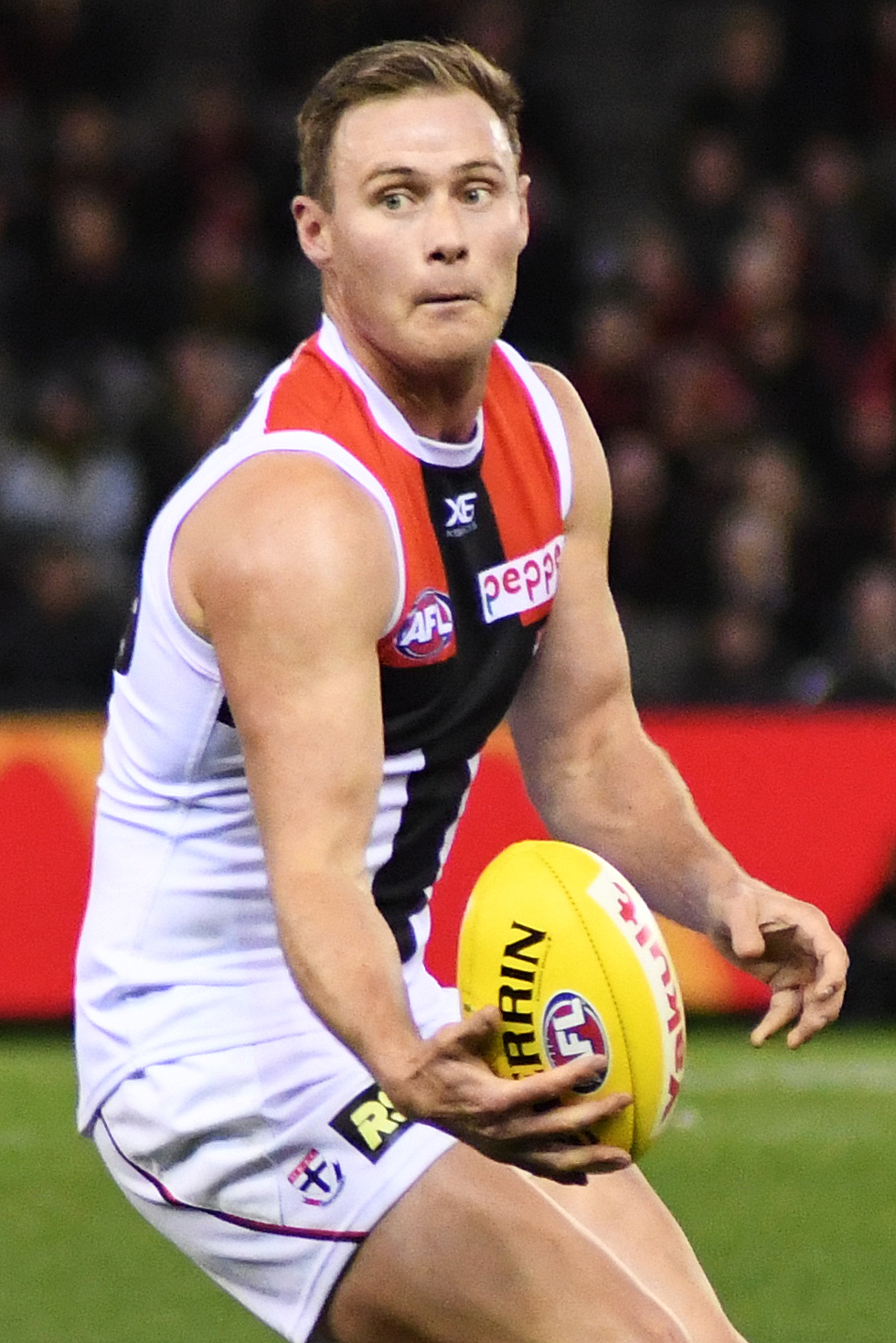
David Armitage was from Mackay

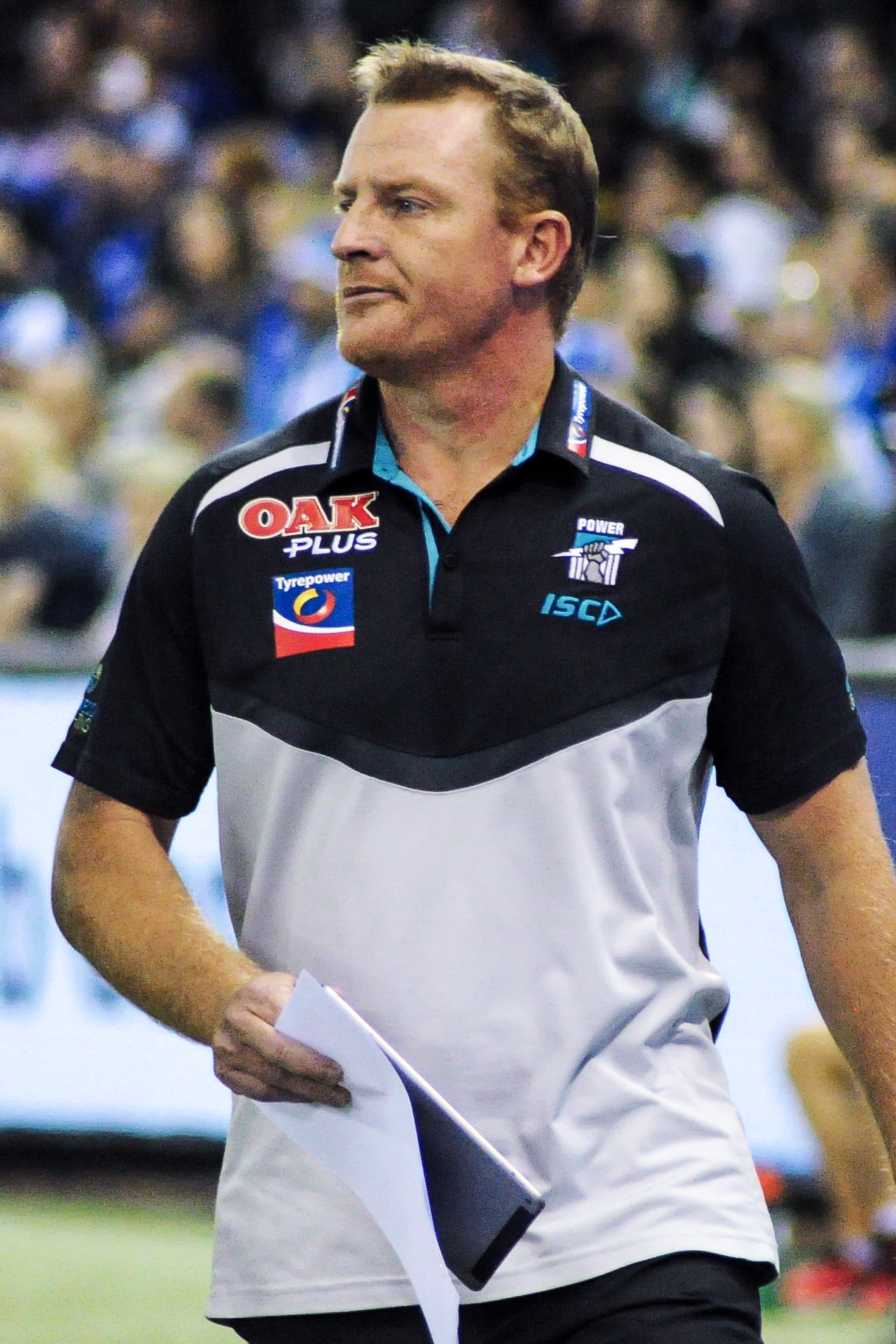
Michael Voss Brownlow Medallist and triple premiership player was from Beenleigh

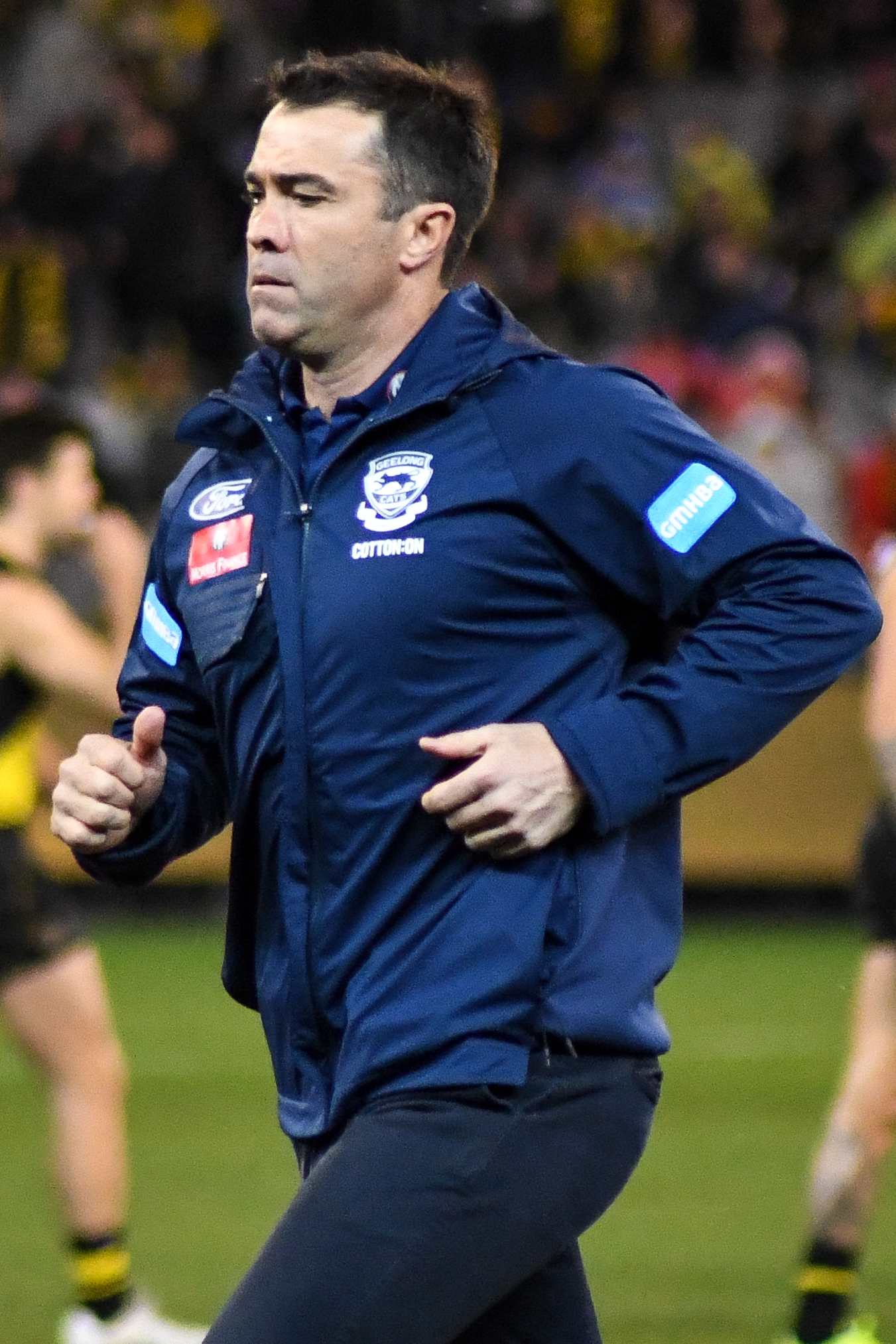
Chris Scott dual premiership player was schooled in Brisbane

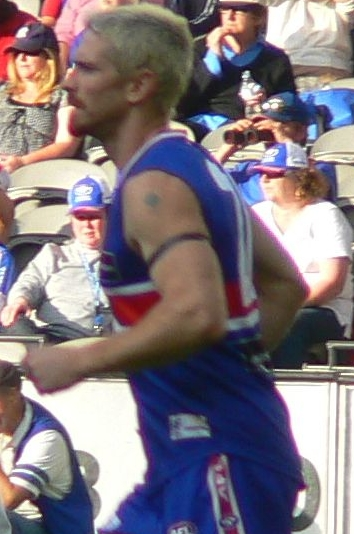
Jason Akermanis Brownlow medallist and triple premierships player was schooled in Brisbane

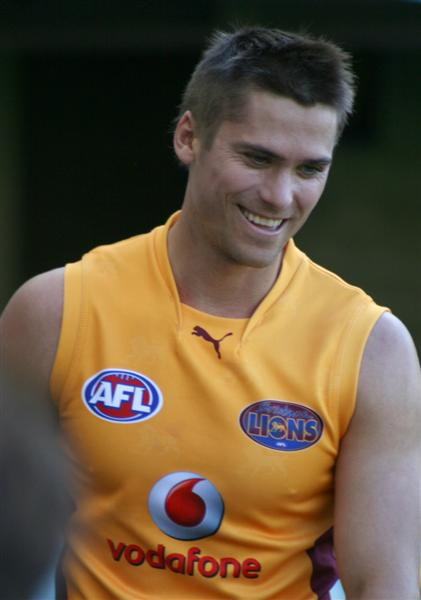
Simon Black Brownlow medallist and triple premiership player was from Mount Isa

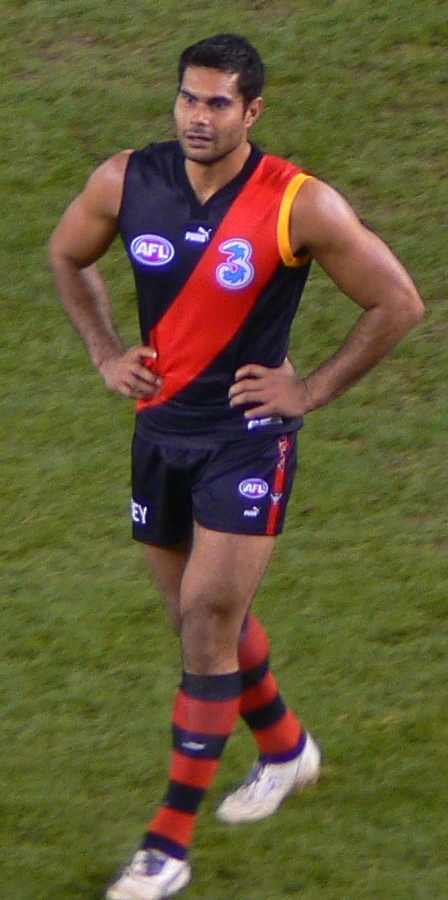
Mal Michael triple premiership player grew up in Brisbane

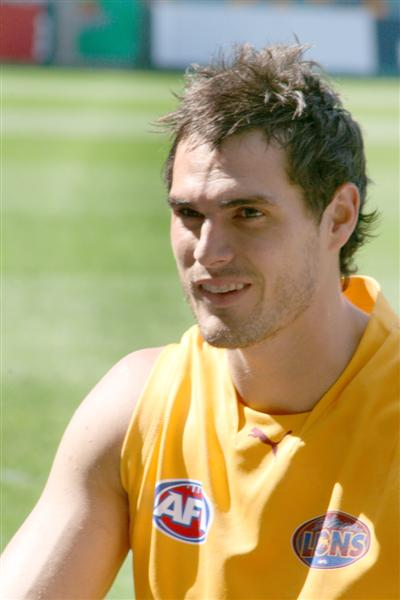
Jamie Charman premiership player was from Maryborough

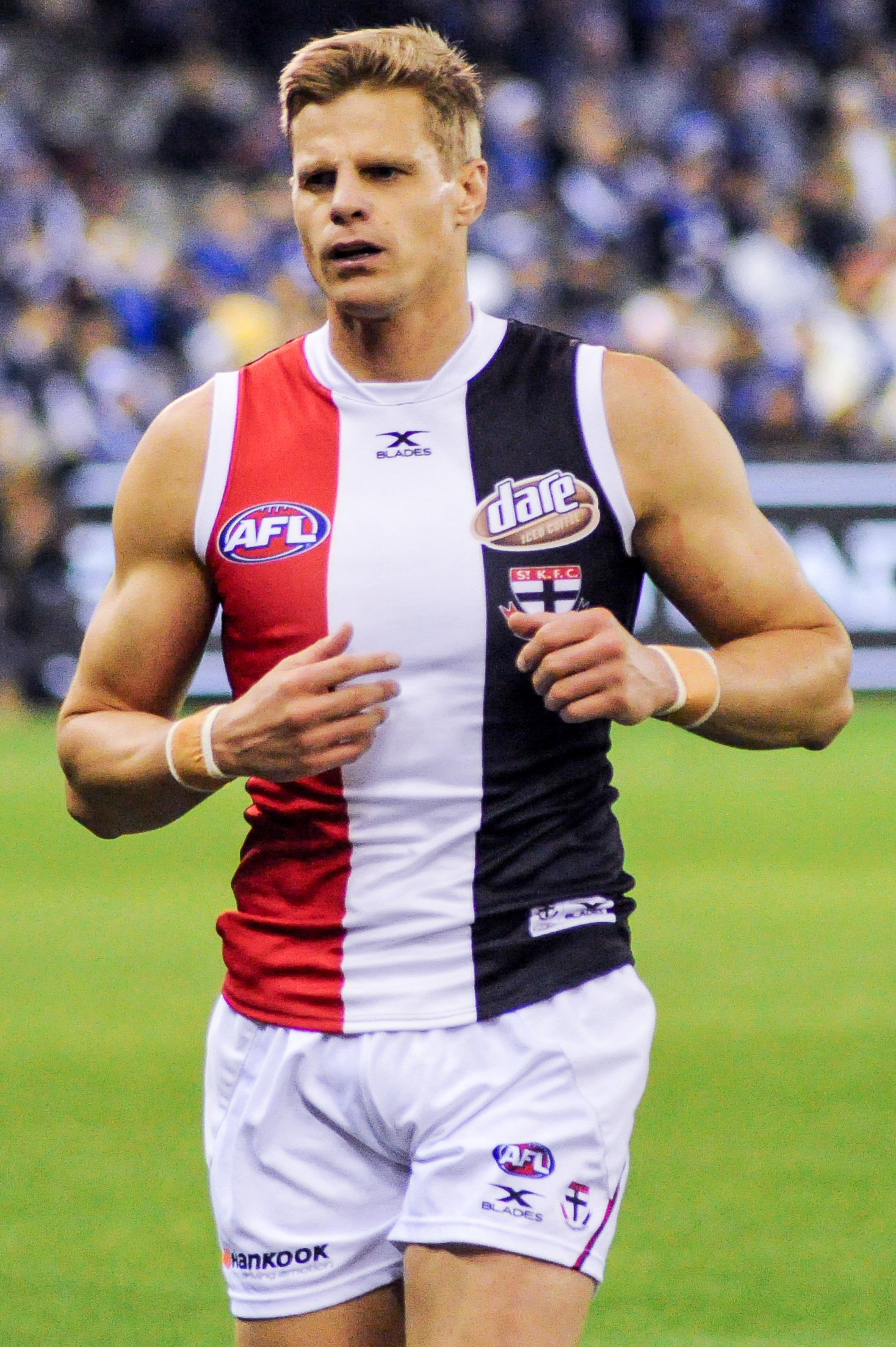
Nick Riewoldt was from the Gold Coast

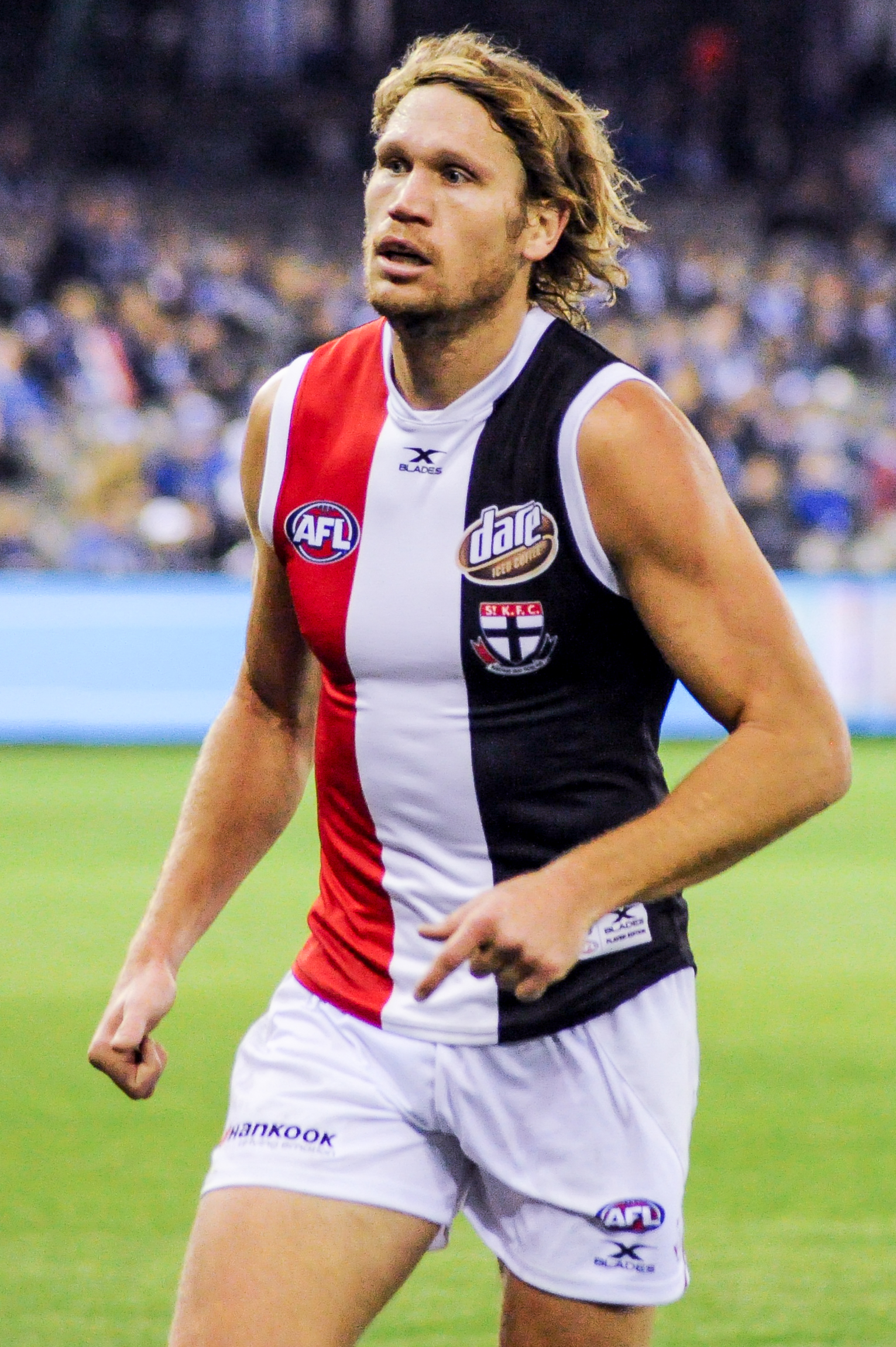
Sam Gilbert was from the Gold Coast

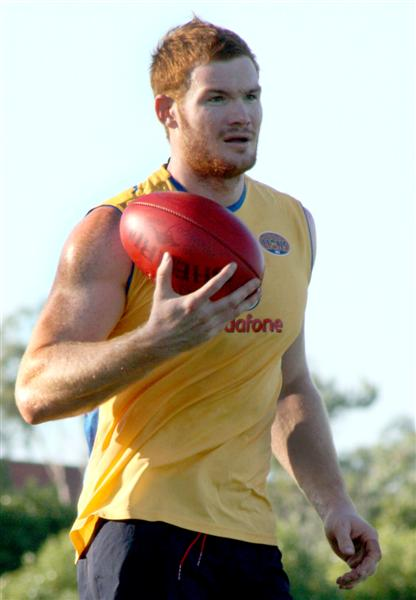
Daniel Merrett was from the Gold Coast

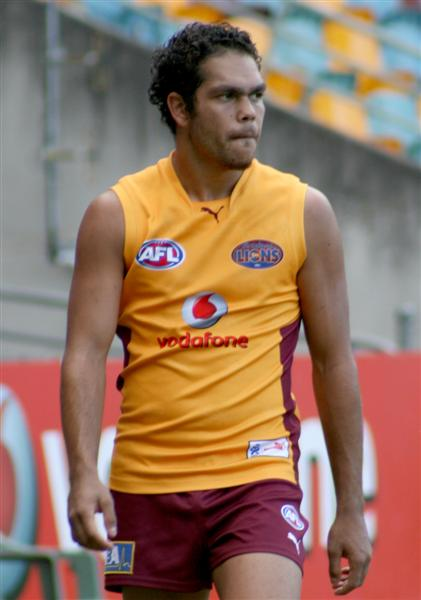
Rhan Hooper was from Cunnamulla and Ipswich

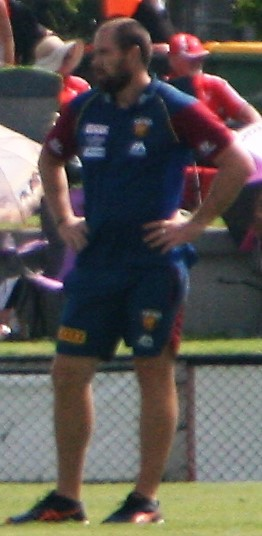
Ben Hudson was from the Gold Coast

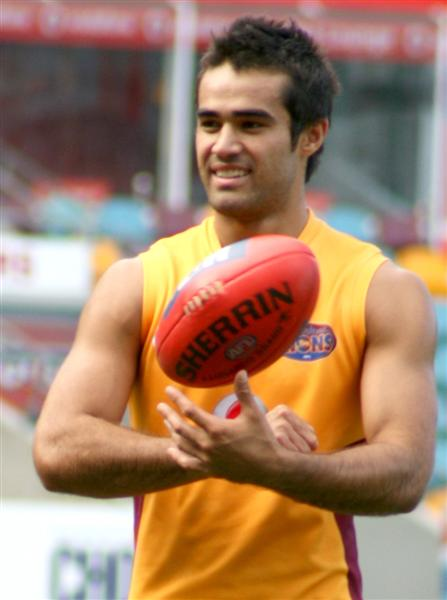
Scott Harding was from Thursday Island

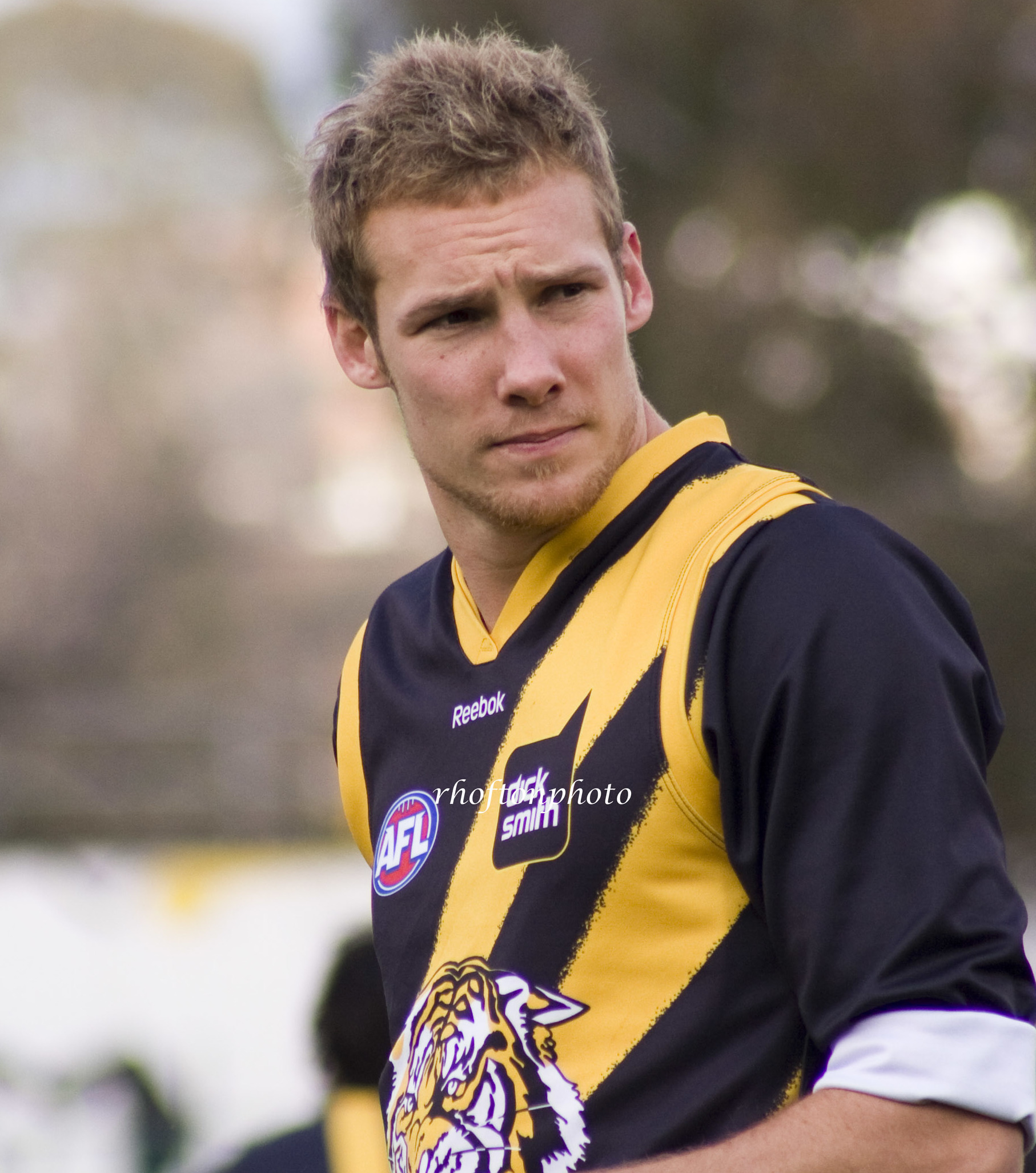
Luke McGuane was from the Gold Coast

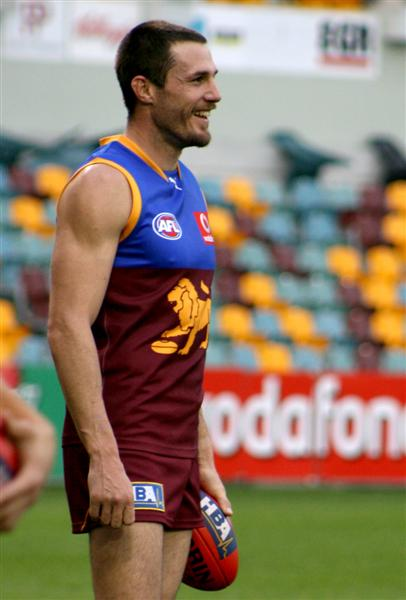
Robert Copeland dual premiership player was from Kilcoy

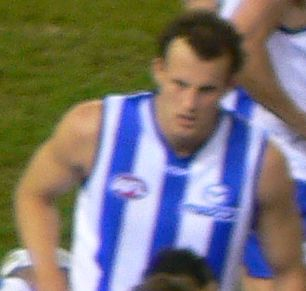
David Hale Triple premiership player was from the Gold Coast

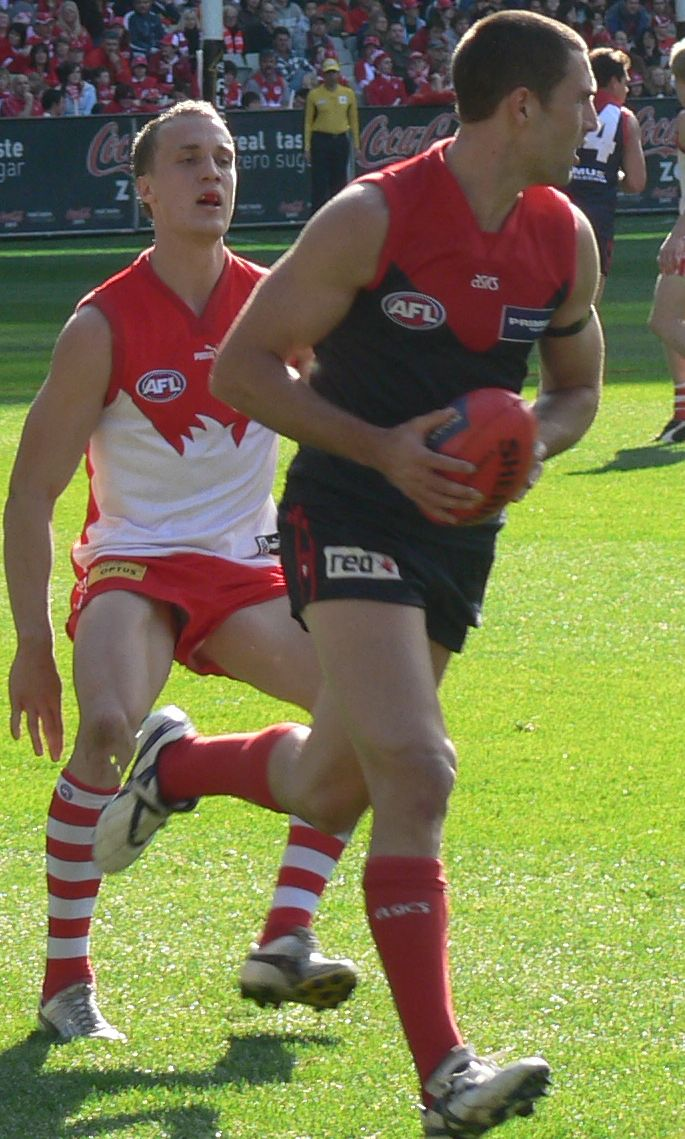
Brad Miller was from Brisbane

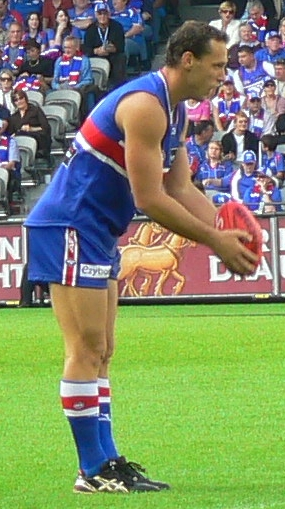
Mitch Hahn was from Brisbane

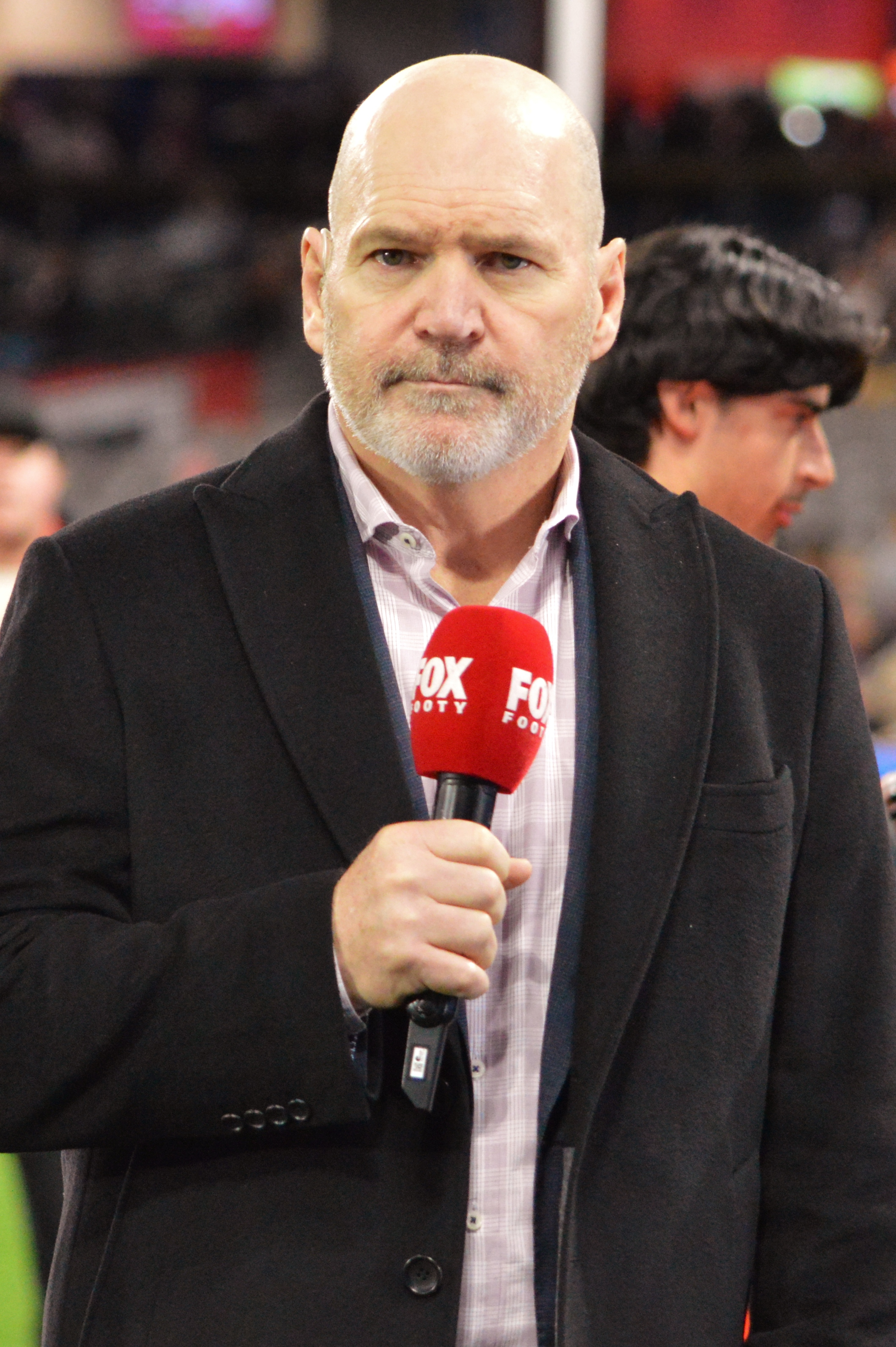
Jason Dunstall was from Brisbane

=== AFL Recruitment Zones ===
Queensland based AFL clubs have priority development access to the Northern Academy Recruitment Zone via the Brisbane Lions Academy and Gold Coast Suns Academy. As a result, many of the players from these areas end up playing in the AFL with the designated club.

QLD AFL Club	Zones
Brisbane Lions	Brisbane (Logan, Brisbane, Ipswich, Moreton Local Government Areas), Sunshine Coast, Darling Downs, Wide Bay-Burnett, Outback Queensland
Gold Coast	Gold Coast region, Northern Queensland (Cairns, Townsville, Rockhampton, Mackay, Mt. Isa, Cape York)

== Bibliography ==
1. Bird, Murray; Parker, Greg (2018). More of the Kangaroo: 150 Years of Australian Football in Queensland – 1866 to 2016. Morningside, Qld. ISBN 978-0-9943936-1-6. OCLC 1082363978.
2. de Moore, Greg; Hess, Rob; Nicholson, Matthew; Stewart, Bob (2021). Australia's Game: The History of Australian Football. Hardie Grant Books. ISBN 9781-74379-657-3.
3. Bird, Murray (2015). Athenians and Red Invincibles – The Origins of Queensland Football. Sports Publishing Pty Ltd. ISBN 9780646938073.
4. John Morton's Queensland Australian Rules Year Book 1960 by John Morton, 1960
5. Queensland Team of the Century Football Record Official Programme, AFL Queensland, 2003
6. Official Souvenir Programme of Collingwood v South Melbourne, Queensland Australian National Football League, 1935

== See also ==
- AFL Queensland
- Australian rules football in South East Queensland
- History of Australian rules football on the Gold Coast
- List of Australian Football Leagues in Queensland
- Brisbane Australian Football Club
- 1961 Brisbane Carnival
