= Welshpool Football Club =

Names
- Full name: Welshpool Football Club
- Nickname(s): Tri-colours, Bulldogs
- Leading goalkicker: Regan Ryan
- Best and fairest: Regan Ryan

Club details
- Founded: unknown
- Dissolved: 1994
- Colours: Red, White and Blue
- Competition: Alberton Football League
- President: Ken Macphail
- Coach: Peter Sutherland
- Captain(s): Regan Ryan
- Premierships: 7 SGFA: 1 (1912); AFL: 6 (1953, 1962, 1969, 1970, 1971, 1979)
- Ground(s): Welshpool Recreation Reserve

Other information
- Official website: none
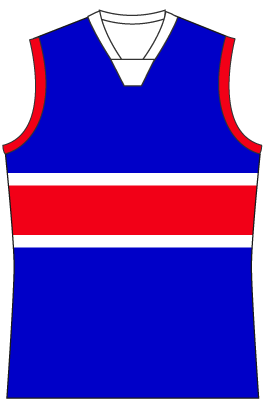
- Guernsey

Welshpool Football Club was an Australian rules football club that participated in the Alberton Football League from 1946 up until 1994. With the continual struggle to entice outside players to the club and a constant strain in retaining local juniors due to lack of employment opportunities, the club ventured into amalgamation talks with neighbouring football clubs Devon and Toora. The outcome would eventually see the club join forces with the Devon Football Club prior to the start of the 1995 Alberton League season. The newly formed Devon-Welshpool Football Club would experience immediate success by claiming the 1995 Alberton League premiership with a six-point triumph over Won Wron-Woodside, winning 11.8 (74) to 10.8 (68) in the last Grand Final played at Yarram.

== Early history ==
Welshpool's earliest history dates back to 1895 but an official date of when the club was formed is not known but there are reports that the club was active during this period. In fact, Welshpool's first known premiership came when it defeated Foster for the 1912 South Gippsland Football Association premiership.

However, the club withdrew from competing in random seasons on numerous occasions and a true gathering of the early history is hard to report on. After a very poor start to the 1911 season and only four wins, Welshpool withdrew from the Association. Even after winning the 1912 premiership, Welshpool again withdrew from the 1913 season and many of the club's leading players joined neighboring rivals. Much of the local football played between 1915 and 1917 was junior matches due to World War I.

=== 1946: Entry to the AFL ===
At the club's annual general meeting in 1946, the WFC decided to join the reforming Alberton Football League, and was a part of the competition up until its independent demise in 1994. The team became known as the "Tri-colours" and was later changed to become the Bulldogs.

In the early season upon the reformation of the league, Welshpool were a regular finalist and made it to the 1949 Grand Final. However, the dominant Woodside combination of this era would deny the Bulldogs of a premiership by 16 points and two years later would again prevent the club from attaining the ultimate success by claiming another AFL flag, this time by nine points.

Welshpool's great players of these earlier years of the AFL were Robert "Bob" Roberts, Alec Grossman, Keith Forbes, Ken Macphail, Robert Sutherland and Les Murray to name a few. Roberts, who came close to winning the League Best & Fairest award in 1950, would win the club's top honour an unprecedented four times during his illustrious career with the Bulldogs.

=== 1969–1971: Premiership years ===
With former North Melbourne player Adrian Beer taking over as coach, Welshpool went 15–3 in 1969, finishing as the minor premiers for a second consecutive year. Rover, Paul Sutherland claimed what no other Welshpool player had been able to do since the re-formation of the AFL in 1946 and that was to win League Best & Fairest award. Ron Tibballs was the club's leading goalkicker for the sixth time with 99 goals, also winning his second AFL goalkicking award. The Bulldogs then went on to win their first premiership in seven years and inflict their second Grand Final defeat over Fish Creek in as many years.

Welshpool again dominated throughout 1970 and were able to produce what no other club has been able to do and that was sustain an unblemished record for the duration of the home and away season with 18 wins and 0 losses in an extraordinary accomplishment. The season included their greatest ever comeback from three-quarter time as the Bulldogs reeled in a 31-point deficit to eventually prevail over Devon by the narrowest of margins, winning 13.9 (87) to 13.8 (86). This time Ron Tibballs was able to achieve 100 goals in the home and away season, which he reached in round 17 against Won Wron before finishing the year with 117 – surpassing Won Wron's Ben "Sonny" Davis' record of 105 in 1957.

=== 1979: Our last premiership ===
A heavy recruiting campaign saw Welshpool throw themselves in the mix as a finals contender, something they had not been a part of since the 1975 season under Laurie Rippon. Former Melbourne and Foster player, Chris Aitken, was appointed coach in 1978 and returned for the 1979 season with a bold plan to make the final four. Chris Hayes, Billy Lynch jnr., Mark James, and Glen James were a number of newcomers to the Bulldogs while Neil Chandler and Bruce Pickering were both enticed to rejoin the club mid-season in an attempt to attain the ultimate success.

== Honour roll ==
Year	Pos.	Coach	Captain	Best & Fairest	Leading Goalkicker	Goals
1946	4	Hughie Marshall	Hughie Marshall		Harry Leach	26
1947	3	Keith Forbes	Keith Forbes		Keith Forbes	45
1948	6	Keith Forbes	Keith Forbes		Keith Forbes	32
1949	2	Alec Grossman	Alec Grossman	Alec Grossman	Les Murray	34
1950	4	Alec Grossman	Alec Grossman	Robert Roberts	Alec Grossman	20
1951	2	Alec Grossman	Alec Grossman	Robert Roberts	Alec Grossman	30
1952	4	Jim Hall	Jim Hall	Bernie Cooper	Bernie Cooper	18
1953	1	Jim Hall	Jim Hall	Russell McAlpine	Robert Sutherland	33
1954	3	Harry Dewsnap	Harry Dewsnap	Robert Roberts	Harry Dewsnap	16
1955	2	Len McCankie	Len McCankie	Alan James	Len McCankie	23
1956	4	Len McCankie	Len McCankie	Robert Roberts	Brian Heagney	40
1957	5	Les W. Jones	Les W. Jones	Les W. Jones	Norm Tibballs	26
1958	7	Brian Heagney	Brian Heagney	Frank Roberts	Brian Heagney	38
1959	4	Brian Rogers; William Tibballs	Brian Rogers; Bernard Cunningham	Jim Roberts	William Hendrie	32
1960	2	David Morris	David Morris	Ken Macphail	Ian Wood	44
1961	5	Neville Morgan; Ken May	Neville Morgan; Ken May	Frank Roberts	Ken May	28
1962	1	Ken May	Ken May	Brian Daff	Norm Thomas	47
1963	4	Ken May	Ken May	Roger McNeill	Ron Tibballs	39
1964	2	Peter Hillier	Peter Hillier	Arthur Roberts	Ron Tibballs	44
1965	4	Peter Hillier	Peter Hillier	Peter Hillier	Ron Tibballs	34
1966	5	Peter Hillier	Peter Hillier	Ray Warren	Ron Tibballs	38
1967	2	Wally Mumford	Wally Mumford	Robert James	Ian Wood	27
1968	2	Wally Mumford	Wally Mumford	Adrian Beer	Ron Tibballs	37
1969	1	Adrian Beer	Adrian Beer	Paul Sutherland	Ron Tibballs	99
1970	1	Adrian Beer	Adrian Beer	Bruce Rickard	Ron Tibballs	117
1971	1	Adrian Beer	Adrian Beer	Claude Skvor	Ron Tibballs	67
1972	5	Claude Skvor	Claude Skvor	Paul Sutherland	Ron Tibballs	54
1973	8	Claude Skvor	Claude Skvor	Graeme Wiggins	Ron Tibballs	44
1974	7	Michael Loughran	Michael Loughran	Graeme Wiggins	Gary Allott	26
1975	3	Laurie Rippon	Laurie Rippon	Neil Chandler	Ron Tibballs	59
1976	5	Adrian Beer	Neil Chandler	Paul Sutherland	Ron Tibballs	28
1977	6	Neil Chandler	Neil Chandler	Russell Renhard	Gary Allott	26
1978	7	Chris Aitken	Chris Aitken	Gary Allott	Chris Aitken	21
1979	1	Chris Aitken	Chris Aitken	Chris Aitken	Gary Allott	51
1980	7	David Clottu	David Clottu	Trevor Young	Ron Tibballs	19
1981	7	Chris Aitken	Chris Aitken	David Clottu	Gary Allott	34
1982	9	Lee Farrell; Neil Chandler	Lee Farrell; Richard Edwards	Gary Allott	Gary Allott	33
1983	7	Neil Chandler	Richard Edwards	Robert Radd	Terry Bishop	23
1984	8	Neil Chandler	Glen Davey	Glen Davey	Richard Edwards	34
1985	7	Glen Davey	Glen Davey; Russell Renhard	Russell Renhard	Frank Parry	30
1986	9	Glen Davey	Glen Davey	Rodney Paragreen	Terry Bishop	26
1987	9	Ian Mills	Paul Macphail	Paul Macphail	Chris Griffiths	12
1988	10	Lance Scott	Lance Scott	Rohan Burke	Peter Sutherland	23
1989	6	Lance Scott	Lance Scott	David Riley	David Riley	35
1990	6	Lance Scott	Lance Scott	Craig Allott	David Riley	49
1991	8	Wayne Lynch	Wayne Lynch	Regan Ryan	Wayne Lynch	36
1992	9	Wayne Lynch	Paul Macphail	Ben Ryan	Ben Ryan	29
1993	6	Eric Peters	Paul Macphail; Dwayne Tibballs	Stephen Hill	Kyron Rendell	41
1994	7	Eric Peters; Peter Sutherland	Regan Ryan	Regan Ryan	Regan Ryan	32

== Match records ==
Highest Scores
Score	Opponent	Year	Venue
32.12 (204)	Carrajung	1948	Welshpool
30.22 (202)	Won Wron	1979	Welshpool
27.27 (189)	Carrajung	1951	TBC
27.25 (177)	Ramblers	1948	Welshpool
26.16 (172)	Fish Creek	1970	Terrill Park
26.16 (172)	Won Wron	1981	Won Wron
25.14 (164)	Won Wron	1969	Welshpool

Lowest Scores
Score	Opponent	Year	Venue
0.3 (3)	Fish Creek	1992	Terrill Park
1.2 (8)	Toora	1952	Welshpool
1.4 (10)	Yarram	1949	Welshpool
1.4 (10)	MDU	1977	Welshpool
2.3 (15)	MDU	1986	Welshpool
1.10 (16)	MDU	1973	Welshpool
2.4 (16)	MDU	1976	Dumbalk

Greatest Winning Margins
Margin	Opponent	Year	Venue
162 pts	Carrajung	1951	TBC
155 pts	Carrajung	1948	Welshpool
155 pts	Won Wron	1969	Welshpool
142 pts	Won Wron	1979	Welshpool
140 pts	Ramblers	1948	Welshpool
131 pts	Carrajung	1952	Carrajung
122 pts	Devon	1993	Welshpool

== Final season: 1994 ==
Saturday 20 August 1994 would prove to be the final time in the proud history of the Welshpool Football Club that a football team would wear the red, white and blue colours for the beloved Bulldogs. The very last match would be played against neighbouring rival, Toora, with Welshpool winning by two points, 16.10 (106) to 15.14 (104).

Welshpool Season 1994
Round 1	Devon (A)	10.8 (68) – 18.15 (123)	Win
Round 2	Meeniyan-Dumbalk United (H)	10.7 (67) – 17.13 (115)	Loss
Round 3	Yarram (A)	16.15 (111) – 14.14 (98)	Loss
Round 4	Foster (H)	14.13 (97) – 12.7 (79)	Win
Round 5	Tarwin (A)	12.14 (86) – 10.9 (69)	Loss
Round 6	Stony Creek (A)	4.5 (29) – 20.16 (136)	Win
Round 7	Won Wron-Woodside (H)	6.6 (42) – 11.13 (79)	Loss
Round 8	Fish Creek (A)	16.16(112) – 13.10 (88)	Loss
Round 9	Toora (H)	19.15 (129) – 9.9 (63)	Win
Round 10	Devon (H)	16.11 (107) – 16.7 (103)	Win
Round 11	Meeniyan-Dumbalk United (A)	14.12 (96) – 9.7 (61)	Loss
Round 12	Yarram (H)	10.13 (73) – 17.13 (115)	Loss
Round 13	Foster (A)	12.11 (83) – 8.15 (63)	Loss
Round 14	Tarwin (H)	16.16 (106) – 14.20 (104)	Win
Round 15	Stony Creek (H)	14.16 (100) – 11.12 (79)	Win
Round 16	Won Wron-Woodside (A)	23.14 (152) – 9.9 (63)	Loss
Round 17	Fish Creek (H)	3.3 (21) – 16.14 (110)	Loss
Round 18	Toora (A)	15.14 (104) – 16.10 (106)	Win

== Individual awards ==
=== Moore Medal winners ===
- Paul Sutherland (1969, 1972)
- Wayne Lynch (1991)

=== AFL Leading Goalkicker winners ===
- Ron Tibballs (1964, 1969, 1970)

== VFL players to come from Welshpool ==
=== Neil Chandler ===
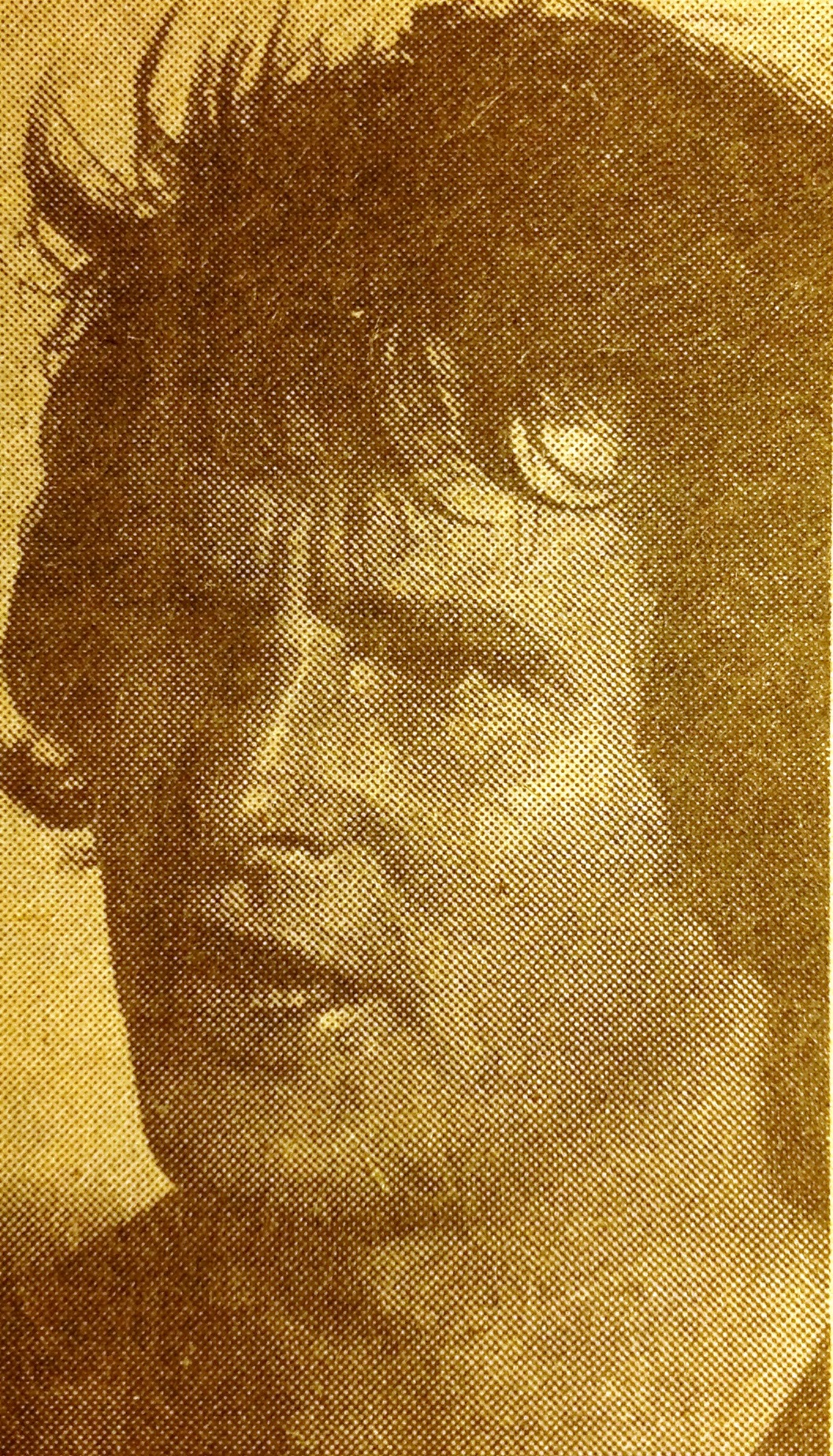
Neil Chandler returned to Welshpool after a short but successful VFL stint where he became a triple premiership player with Carlton

Playing career: 1968–1974 (Carlton 1968–74, St Kilda 1974)

Games: 82 (Carlton 76, St. Kilda 6)

Goals: 25 (Carlton 22, St. Kilda 3)

A three time premiership player with Carlton, Chandler played 76 games for the Blues including the 1968, 1970 and 1972 premierships. He also played in the 1973 Grand Final team that lost to Richmond by 30 points. In 1974, Chandler played four games with the Blues before gaining a clearance to St Kilda where he added a further six games to his VFL career before returning home to Welshpool in 1975.

=== Laurie Rippon ===
Playing career: 1969–1973 (Footscray)

Games: 45 (Footscray 45)

Goals: 4 (Footscray 4)

Another product that came out of the Welshpool juniors to make it to the VFL/AFL. Didn't quite reach the success of Chandler but still managed to be a premiership player for the Bulldogs after Footscray defeated Richmond for the 1970 Night Premiership. In 1975, Rippn returned to his native Bulldogs where he coached the club to a preliminary final loss to Woodside. Rippon eventually moved on to play at Woodside and Devon in later years.

=== Max Parker ===
Playing career: 1971 (Footscray)

Games: 5 (Footscray 5)

Goals: 6 (Footscray 6)

Became an inspirational legend of SANFL club, Woodville. Parker was initial recruited by Footscray for the 1971 VFL season and played 5 games during the season as a ruckman but found it hard to crack a regular spot against the likes of Gary Dempsey and Barry Round. He became a part of the Ray Huppatz swap and then forged a remarkable career with Woodville that spanned over 250 games for the Eagles. Captained the club in 1982 and again in 1986–87 under the tutelage of VFL/AFL legend, Malcolm Blight. Max made a short return to the Welshpool Football Club in 1990 with a handful of games played before his career eventually closed.
