= Alberton Football Netball League =

Alberton league - football

- Formerly: Alberton Football Association
- Sport: Australian rules football, Netball
- First season: 1946
- Folded: 2020
- No. of teams: 6
- Country: Australia
- Last champions: Foster (9 premierships)
- Most titles: Fish Creek (20 premierships)

The Alberton Football Netball League (AFNL) was an Australian rules football and netball competition based in the South Gippsland region of Victoria, Australia. The post-war competition was re-established in 1946 as the Alberton Football Association, with Carrajung, Devon, Foster, Ramblers, Toora, Welshpool, Woodside and Yarram comprising the competition.

The league's final completed season was held in 2019. Its 2020 season was cancelled because of restrictions associated with the COVID-19 pandemic. In August 2020, the Mid Gippsland Football Netball League voted to admit Alberton's six remaining clubs — Fish Creek, Foster, Meeniyan Dumbalk United, Stony Creek, Tarwin and Toora — from the 2021 season. The Alberton Football Netball League was subsequently wound up at the end of 2020.

== History ==
=== Re-establishment and early years ===
The Alberton Football Association was re-established in 1946 following the Second World War, with eight clubs comprising the competition: Carrajung, Devon, Foster, Ramblers, Toora, Welshpool, Woodside and Yarram. Foster won the first post-war premiership, defeating Woodside in the 1946 grand final.

The association became known as the Alberton Football League in 1948. Woodside dominated the early years of the competition, winning six consecutive senior premierships from 1947 to 1952. Ramblers left the competition following the 1948 season and Won Wron joined in 1949.

Carrajung departed following the 1952 season and Fish Creek joined the league in 1953. Fish Creek reached the grand final in each of its first 15 seasons in the competition, from 1953 to 1967, winning 11 premierships during that period: 1955, 1956, 1958–1961 and 1963–1967. The run of 15 consecutive grand final appearances remains one of the most sustained periods of success in Gippsland football.

=== Expansion and consolidation ===
The composition of football in South Gippsland changed significantly in 1969. Following the demise of the South Gippsland Football League, Meeniyan Dumbalk United and Stony Creek joined Alberton. Welshpool won three consecutive senior premierships from 1969 to 1971, including an undefeated premiership season in 1970.

Toora won its sole Alberton senior premiership in 1973, defeating Meeniyan Dumbalk United by one point. Woodside added another premiership in 1974, while Meeniyan Dumbalk United won consecutive flags in 1975 and 1976.

The number of separate clubs in the league began to contract through mergers during the following decades. Won Wron and Woodside amalgamated ahead of the 1982 season to form Won Wron-Woodside. The combined club won the 1994 senior premiership.

Tarwin joined the Alberton league in 1988, returning the competition to ten clubs. Welshpool and Devon, both long-standing members of the league, amalgamated to form Devon-Welshpool ahead of the 1995 season. The newly formed club won the premiership in its first season, defeating Won Wron-Woodside by six points in the 1995 grand final.

=== League expansion and club mergers ===
The league underwent major expansion in 1996 following a restructuring of football in the region by the Victorian Country Football League. Five clubs from the former Bass Valley-Wonthaggi Football League—Dalyston, Inverloch-Kongwak, Korumburra, Bena and Wonthaggi Rovers—joined Alberton, increasing the competition to 14 clubs. A final-five system was introduced following the expansion.

Devon-Welshpool and Won Wron-Woodside amalgamated in 1997, initially competing as the East Coast Allies before becoming known as Devon-Welshpool-Won Wron-Woodside (DWWWW). The combined club won senior premierships in 1998, 1999 and 2003. Korumburra and Bena later merged to form Korumburra-Bena in 2001.

The league expanded further in 2005 when Phillip Island and Kilcunda-Bass joined the competition. The same year, Wonthaggi Rovers merged with Wonthaggi Blues to form Wonthaggi Power, which also competed in Alberton.

=== Wonthaggi Power and the DWWWW split ===
Wonthaggi Power immediately became one of the competition's strongest clubs, reaching the senior grand final in each of its five seasons in Alberton. The club won premierships in 2005, 2006 and 2008, while its relative size compared with many of the smaller Alberton communities led to concerns about competitive balance within the league.

The Victorian Country Football League ultimately determined that Wonthaggi should move to a stronger competition. Tensions surrounding Wonthaggi's continued participation culminated in Yarram forfeiting all grades of football and netball against the club in May 2008. Wonthaggi nevertheless completed the 2008 senior season undefeated and defeated Yarram in the grand final.

The 2009 season was confirmed as Wonthaggi's final year in Alberton. The club again finished on top of the ladder and advanced to a fifth consecutive grand final, where it faced Stony Creek. Stony Creek defeated Wonthaggi 14.10 (94) to 11.14 (80), securing its first senior premiership since 1983. Wonthaggi transferred to the Gippsland League for the 2010 season.

During the same period, tensions also developed within DWWWW. Following disagreement over the club's future direction and home-ground arrangements, a group associated largely with the former Won Wron-Woodside component established the Woodside & District Football Club. Woodside entered the North Gippsland Football Netball League in 2008, while DWWWW remained in Alberton.

DWWWW struggled for playing numbers and on-field success following the split. The club entered recess for the 2014 season before returning to competition in 2015. It competed for a further three seasons before again entering recess ahead of the 2018 season.

=== Contraction and regional restructuring ===
The departure of Wonthaggi was followed by further changes to the league's membership. In 2013, Yarram sought permission to leave Alberton and join the North Gippsland Football League. North Gippsland clubs were initially split over the application, with concerns including the reintroduction of a bye and competition for junior players. Yarram's appeal was subsequently upheld and the club entered North Gippsland for the 2014 season, ending 68 seasons of continuous participation in Alberton.

AFL Gippsland commenced a review of senior football and netball competition structures in 2015, citing issues including competitive balance and club sustainability. The review resulted in the establishment of the West Gippsland Football Netball Competition for the 2017 season. Five Alberton clubs — Dalyston, Inverloch-Kongwak, Kilcunda-Bass, Korumburra-Bena and Phillip Island — left to become inaugural members of the new competition. Their departure reduced Alberton from 12 clubs in 2016 to seven in 2017.

When DWWWW entered recess ahead of 2018, only six active clubs remained: Fish Creek, Foster, Meeniyan Dumbalk United, Stony Creek, Tarwin and Toora.

=== Final years and dissolution ===
A further AFL Gippsland review in 2018 recommended that the six remaining Alberton clubs join the Mid Gippsland competition as part of a new 15-club structure. Mid Gippsland successfully appealed against the proposal, leaving the six Alberton clubs to consider other options.

In 2019, all six clubs applied to join the Ellinbank and District Football Netball League for the following season, but their applications were unsuccessful. At the same time, AFL Victoria commissioned further work on the future structure of football and netball in Gippsland. By this stage the long-term viability of a standalone six-club Alberton competition was considered increasingly uncertain.

The final completed Alberton season was held in 2019. Foster and Stony Creek contested the senior grand final at Tarwin Lower on 31 August, with Foster winning by seven points to claim its ninth Alberton senior premiership.

The planned 2020 season was cancelled because of restrictions associated with the COVID-19 pandemic. During the recess, AFL Gippsland's Gippsland 2025 Strategy recommended a merger between Alberton and Mid Gippsland. Rather than merge the two competitions, the Mid Gippsland Football Netball League voted on 24 August 2020 to admit all six remaining Alberton clubs from the 2021 season.

The Alberton Football Netball League held its final annual general meeting on 25 November 2020, at which members passed a special resolution to wind up the league. Fish Creek, Foster, Meeniyan Dumbalk United, Stony Creek, Tarwin and Toora subsequently became members of the Mid Gippsland Football Netball League from the 2021 season.

== Clubs ==
=== Final clubs ===
Club	Colours	Nickname	Home Ground	Former League	Est.	Years in AFNL	AFNL Senior Premierships	
Club	Colours	Nickname	Home Ground	Former League	Est.	Years in AFNL	Total	Years
Fish Creek		Kangaroos	John Terrill Memorial Park, Fish Creek	SGFL	1891	1953-2019	20	1955, 1956, 1958, 1959, 1960, 1961, 1963, 1964, 1965, 1966, 1967, 1985, 1991, 1992, 2000, 2001, 2002, 2016, 2017, 2018
Foster		Tigers	Foster Showgrounds, Foster	SGFL	1890	1946-2019	9	1946, 1978, 1980, 1982, 1984, 1989, 1993, 2010, 2019
Meeniyan Dumbalk United		Demons	Meeniyan Recreation Reserve, Meeniyan	SGFL	1964	1969-2019	5	1975, 1976, 1981, 1988, 1990
Stony Creek		Lions	Stony Creek Racecourse, Stony Creek	SGFL	1894	1969-2019	2	1983, 2009
Tarwin	(1988-?)(?-2019)	Sharks	Tarwin Lower Recreation Reserve, Tarwin Lower	–	1988	1988-2019	1	2004
Toora & District		Magpies	Toora Recreation Reserve, Toora	SGFL	1891	1946-2019	1	1973

=== Former clubs ===
Club	Colours	Nickname	Home Ground	Former League	Est.	Years in AFNL	AFNL Senior Premierships		Fate
Club	Colours	Nickname	Home Ground	Former League	Est.	Years in AFNL	Total	Years	Fate
Bena		Bulls, Beanmen	Korumburra Showgrounds, Korumburra	BVWDFL	1921	1996-2000	0	—	Merged with Korumburra to form Korumburra-Bena in 2001
Carrajung			Carrajung Memorial Park, Carrajung	–	1911	1946-1952	0	—	Folded in 1952
Dalyston		Magpies	Dalyston Recreation Reserve, Dalyston	BVWDFL	1898	1996-2016	1	2015	Moved to West Gippsland FNC in 2016
Devon		Bombers	Alberton West Recreation Reserve, Alberton West	AFA	1883	1946-1994	2	1968, 1987	Merged with Welshpool to form Devon-Welshpool in 1995
Devon-Welshpool		Bombers, Bulldogs	Alberton West Recreation Reserve, Alberton West and Arthur Sutherland Reserve, Welshpool	–	1995	1995-1996	2	1995, 1996	Merged with Won Wron-Woodside to form East Coast Allies (later Devon-Welshpool-Won Wron-Woodside) in 1997
Devon-Welshpool-Won Wron-Woodside (East Coast Allies 1997)	(1997-?)(?-2017)	Allies, Four Wheel Drives	Alberton West Recreation Reserve, Alberton West	–	1997	1997-2013, 2015-2017	3	1998, 1999, 2003	Entered recess in 2014, returned in 2015, folded in 2018
Inverloch-Kongwak		Sea Eagles	Inverloch Recreation Reserve, Inverloch	BVWDFL	1957	1996-2016	0	—	Moved to West Gippsland FNC in 2016
Kilcunda-Bass		Panthers	Bass Recreation Reserve, Bass	GL	1957	2005-2016	3	2011, 2012, 2013	Moved to West Gippsland FNC in 2016
Korumburra		Bullants	Korumburra Recreation Reserve, Korumburra	BVWDFL	1911	1996-2000	1	1997	Merged with Bena to form Korumburra-Bena in 2001
Korumburra-Bena	(2001-14)(2015-16)	Giants	Korumburra Showgrounds, Korumburra	–	2001	2001-2016	0	—	Moved to West Gippsland FNC in 2016
Phillip Island		Bulldogs	Cowes Recreation Reserve, Cowes	GL	1932	2005-2016	1	2014	Moved to West Gippsland FNC in 2016
Ramblers		Ramblers	? (ground was in Hiawatha)	AFA	1900	1946-1948	0	—	Folded in 1948
Welshpool		Bulldogs	Arthur Sutherland Reserve, Welshpool	AFA	1909	1946-1994	6	1953, 1962, 1969, 1970, 1971, 1979	Merged with Devon to form Devon-Welshpool in 1995
Won Wron (Won Wron Rovers 1949-51)	(1949-60s)(1960s-78)(1979-81)	Swans	Won Wron Recreation Reserve, Won Wron	AFA	1919	1949-1981	0	—	Merged with Woodside to form Won Wron-Woodside in 1982
Won Wron-Woodside		Blues	Won Wron Recreation Reserve, Won Wron and Woodside Recreation Reserve, Woodside	–	1982	1982-1996	1	1994	Merged with Devon-Welshpool to form East Coast Allies (later Devon-Welshpool-Won Wron-Woodside) in 1997
Wonthaggi Rovers		Tigers	Wonthaggi Recreation Reserve, Wonthaggi	BVWDFL	1956	1996-2004	0	—	Merged with Wonthaggi Blues to form Wonthaggi Power in 2005
Wonthaggi		Power	Wonthaggi Recreation Reserve, Wonthaggi	–	2005	2005-2009	3	2005, 2006, 2008	Moved to West Gippsland Latrobe FL in 2010 when ordered to by the VCFL.
Woodside		Blues	Woodside Recreation Reserve, Woodside	AFA	1908	1946-1981	8	1947, 1948, 1949, 1950, 1951, 1952, 1957, 1974	Merged with Won Wron to form Won Wron-Woodside in 1982
Yarram		Demons	Yarram Recreation Reserve, Yarram	GFL	1887	1946-2013	5	1954, 1972, 1977, 1986, 2007	Moved to North Gippsland FL in 2014

=== Timeline of clubs ===
| = indicates premiership year
Club recess

== Players ==
=== VFL/AFL Players ===
During its history the Alberton Football League has produced a number of players who would go on to play in the VFL/AFL competition.

==== Jarryd Blair ====
Jarryd Blair played junior football at Wonthaggi Power and in 2006 he was a part of the senior premiership team. He was selected as pick 27 in the 2009 AFL rookie draft and made his AFL debut in round 14, 2010 against West Coast at Etihad Stadium. His debut AFL season saw him play in Collingwood's 2010 premiership team. Blair played 157 games for Collingwood before being delisted in 2018. In 2020, Wonthaggi Power announced that Blair had been appointed as senior coach for the 2021 season in the Gippsland League.

==== Brent Macaffer ====
Brent Macaffer was selected as pick 26 in the 2007 AFL rookie draft. He would play in Collingwood's 2010 premiership team. In 2016, Macaffer announced his retirement from AFL football. Macaffer would return to his original club, Kilcunda Bass to coach the club for the 2017 season. On 13 February 2019, Macaffer was awarded a life member of the Collingwood Football Club.

==== Nathan Vardy ====
Nathan Vardy played his junior football for DWWWW. He was selected at pick 42 by Geelong in the 2009 national draft. At the conclusion of the 2016 season Vardy was traded to the West Coast Eagles. In 2017, with Nic Naitanui and Scott Lycett injured, Vardy had to take charge as West Coast's number one ruckman and played almost every game. He played a critical role in West Coast's 2018 premiership team. Vardy is one of four current former Alberton players listed by AFL clubs.

Player	Original Alberton club	VFL/AFL club(s)	VFL/AFL games played	First season	Most recent season
Ian Abraham	Won Wron	Collingwood	3	1960	1961
Damien Adkins	Meeniyan Dumbalk United	Collingwood / West Coast Eagles	54	2000	2005
Anthony Banik	Won Wron-Woodside	Richmond	49	1990	1994
Jarryd Blair	Wonthaggi Power	Collingwood	157	2010	2018
Neil Chandler	Welshpool	Carlton / St Kilda	82	1968	1974
Sam Docherty	Phillip Island	Brisbane Lions / Carlton	108*	2013	2020
Andrew Dunkley	Devon	Sydney Swans	217	1992	2002
Xavier Duursma	Foster	Port Adelaide	35*	2019	2020
Brett Eddy	Foster	Port Adelaide	3	2017	2017
Robert Eddy	Stony Creek	St Kilda	33	2007	2011
Sam Flanders	Fish Creek	Gold Coast Suns	5*	2020	2020
Mitch Golby	Kilcunda Bass	Brisbane Lions	56	2011	2015
Jed Lamb	Yarram	Sydney Swans / GWS Giants / Carlton	66	2011	2018
Brent Macaffer	Kilcunda Bass	Collingwood	77	2009	2016
Max Parker	Welshpool	Footscray	5	1971	1971
Laurie Rippon	Welshpool	Footscray	45	1969	1973
Barry Standfield	Fish Creek	Footscray / Adelaide	111	1990	1997
Wayne Weidemann	Fish Creek	Adelaide	68	1991	1996
Trent West	Wonthaggi Power	Geelong / Brisbane Lions	70	2008	2016
Nathan Vardy	DWWWW	Geelong / West Coast Eagles	68*	2010	2020
Current AFL listed player *Games played correct as at 5 October 2020 † List may not be complete

== Awards ==
The following major individual awards and accolades are presented each season:

- Peter Moore Medal — to the fairest and best player in the league, voted by the umpires
- Leading goal kicker award — for the player who scores the most goals during the home & away season
- Bill Pollock Medal — the best player on the ground in the grand final
- Rising star award — a monthly award for promising up-and-coming players
- Team of the year — a squad of 21 players deemed the best in their positions
- Most disciplined club award — for the club who receives the most discipline points, voted by the umpires

== Season structure ==
=== Pre-season ===
The Alberton Football League like most country leagues does not have a formal Pre-season competition. As part of their Pre-season preparation clubs will often schedule between one and two practice matches with clubs from other leagues prior to the season beginning. These matches could take on different structures and were primarily conducted on a non-official basis with limited match officials and scores not being recorded.

=== Premiership season ===
The Alberton home-and-away season at present lasts for 15 rounds, starting in mid April and ending in early August. As of the 2017 season, each team plays 15 matches. Teams receive four premiership points for a win and two premiership points for a draw. Ladder finishing positions are based on the number of premiership points won, and "percentage" (calculated as the ratio of points scored to points conceded throughout the season) is used as a tie-breaker when teams finish with equal premiership points.

=== Finals series ===
Since its inception until 1995 the Alberton finals consisted of a 'final-four' system. With the inclusion of a number of clubs from the defunct Bass Valley Wonthaggi football league in 1996 the finals series was expanded to a 'final-five' system. The finals series was expanded again in 2005 with the inclusion of Kilcunda Bass and Phillip Island to become a 'final-six' system. Since 2017 the finals series has since returned to a 'final-four' system, after a number of clubs left resulting in a smaller competition.

The top four teams at the end of the Alberton home & away season compete in a four-week finals series throughout August, culminating in a grand final to determine the premiers. The grand final is played on the afternoon of the last Saturday in August.

The winning team receives a silver premiership cup and a premiership flag – a new one of each is manufactured each year. The flag has been presented since the league began and is traditionally unfurled at the team's first home game of the following season. Additionally, each player in the grand final-winning team receives a premiership medallion.

==== 2019 Finals series ====
Qualifying – Week 2 / Elimination – Week 1
1	Foster	12.8 (80)
2	Stony Creek	8.5 (53)
3	Fish Creek	23.10 (148)
4	Toora & District	4.5 (29)

Preliminary – Week 3
2	Stony Creek	12.10 (82)
3	Fish Creek	7.5 (47)

Grand Final – Week 4
1	Foster	8.7 (55)
2	Stony Creek	7.6 (48)

==== Grand final venues ====
For most of its history the Alberton football league grand final was hosted at the Yarram recreation reserve. With the expansion of the league in 1996 the grand final was relocated to the Foster Showgrounds to maintain a central location with respect to the rest of the league. With Foster football club making the grand final in 2010 and 2011 the grand final was subsequently relocated to Inverloch recreation reserve to avoid a home-ground advantage. The grand final venue would then cycle back to Foster in 2012. The grand final since cycled between a few different venues until Tarwin Lower recreation reserve hosted the last Alberton grand final in 2019.

- Yarram Recreation Reserve (1946–1952)
- Welshpool Recreation Reserve (1953)
- Yarram Recreation Reserve (1954–1973)
- Foster Showgrounds (1974)
- Yarram Recreation Reserve (1975)
- Foster Showgrounds (1976–1977)
- Yarram Recreation Reserve (1978–1995)
- Foster Showgrounds (1996–2009)
- Inverloch Recreation Reserve (2010–2011)
- Foster Showgrounds (2012)
- Wonthaggi Recreation Reserve (2013)
- Meeniyan Recreation Reserve (2014–2018)
- Tarwin Lower Recreation Reserve (2019)

== Finals history ==
Year	Premier	Runner-up	Third	Fourth	Fifth	Sixth
1946	Foster 3.4 (22)	Woodside 2.7 (19)	Devon	Welshpool		
1947	Woodside 15.23 (113)	Foster 9.6 (60)	Welshpool	Devon		
1948	Woodside 11.15 (81)	Devon 11.5 (71)	Toora	Yarram		
1949	Woodside 11.18 (84)	Welshpool 9.14 (68)	Yarram	Devon		
1950	Woodside 8.17 (65)	Devon 7.10 (52)	Yarram	Welshpool		
1951	Woodside 10.15 (75)	Welshpool 9.12 (66)	Yarram	Foster		
1952	Woodside 3.5 (23)	Toora 2.7 (19)	Foster	Welshpool		
1953	Welshpool 16.20 (116)	Fish Creek 6.6 (42)	Toora	Woodside		
1954	Yarram 10.12 (72)	Fish Creek 11.4 (70)	Welshpool	Woodside		
1955	Fish Creek 16.7 (103)	Welshpool 7.10 (52)	Woodside	Yarram		
1956	Fish Creek 17.12 (114)	Woodside 15.14 (104)	Yarram	Welshpool		
1957	Woodside 9.10 (64)	Fish Creek 7.11 (53)	Foster	Yarram		
1958	Fish Creek 18.14 (122)	Yarram 15.13 (103)	Woodside	Foster		
1959	Fish Creek 16.15 (111)	Yarram 11.14 (80)	Won Wron	Welshpool		
1960	Fish Creek 8.14 (62)	Welshpool 6.8 (44)	Won Wron	Yarram		
1961	Fish Creek 15.14 (104)	Devon 7.6 (48)	Toora	Won Wron		
1962	Welshpool 7.13 (55)	Fish Creek 8.5 (53)	Foster	Yarram		
1963	Fish Creek 13.8 (86)	Toora 4.11 (35)	Foster	Welshpool		
1964	Fish Creek 8.6 (54)	Welshpool 5.5 (35)	Toora	Devon		
1965	Fish Creek 9.11 (65)	Toora 8.9 (57)	Won Wron	Welshpool		
1966	Fish Creek 17.17 (119)	Toora 9.7 (61)	Yarram	Foster		
1967	Fish Creek 12.8 (80)	Welshpool 9.11 (65)	Won Wron	Devon		
1968	Devon 12.9 (81)	Welshpool 7.3 (45)	Toora	Foster		
1969	Welshpool 12.24 (96)	Fish Creek 9.11 (65)	Toora	Foster		
1970	Welshpool 12.16 (88)	Toora 8.7 (55)	Yarram	Foster		
1971	Welshpool 12.12 (84)	Woodside 6.5 (41)	Won Wron	Toora		
1972	Yarram 14.14 (98)	Meeniyan-Dumbalk United 9.20 (74)	Woodside	Toora		
1973	Toora 10.13 (73)	Meeniyan-Dumbalk United 10.12 (72)	Woodside	Foster		
1974	Woodside 10.13 (73)	Yarram 5.8 (38)	Meeniyan-Dumbalk United	Toora		
1975	Meeniyan-Dumbalk United 17.19 (121)	Woodside 5.16 (46)	Welshpool	Yarram		
1976	Meeniyan-Dumbalk United 15.16 (106)	Yarram 10.12 (72)	Woodside	Fish Creek		
1977	Yarram 18.15 (123)	Meeniyan-Dumbalk United 16.12 (108)	Foster	Woodside		
1978	Foster 13.14 (92)	Woodside 5.9 (39)	Yarram	Meeniyan-Dumbalk United		
1979	Welshpool 12.18 (90)	Foster 13.10 (88)	Meeniyan-Dumbalk United	Stony Creek		
1980	Foster 11.17 (83)	Stony Creek 8.7 (55)	Meeniyan-Dumbalk United	Toora		
1981	Meeniyan-Dumbalk United 9.14 (68)	Foster 6.16 (52)	Stony Creek	Toora		
1982	Foster 14.11 (95)	Won Wron-Woodside 8.8 (56)	Meeniyan-Dumbalk United	Devon		
1983	Stony Creek 14.13 (97)	Devon 7.6 (48)	Meeniyan-Dumbalk United	Won Wron-Woodside		
1984	Foster 15.7 (97)	Meeniyan-Dumbalk United 9.11 (65)	Won Wron-Woodside	Fish Creek		
1985	Fish Creek 8.9 (57)	Stony Creek 3.11 (29)	Devon	Yarram		
1986	Yarram 15.12 (102)	Devon 5.8 (38)	Won Wron-Woodside	Stony Creek		
1987	Devon 11.10 (76)	Fish Creek 8.15 (63)	Won Wron-Woodside	Yarram		
1988	Meeniyan-Dumbalk United 16.15 (111)	Fish Creek 10.9 (69)	Devon	Won Wron-Woodside		
1989	Foster 12.10 (82)	Toora 7.8 (50)	Meeniyan-Dumbalk United	Devon		
1990	Meeniyan-Dumbalk United 14.19 (103)	Foster 11.12 (78)	Fish Creek	Toora		
1991	Fish Creek 20.8 (128)	Foster 7.11 (53)	Meeniyan-Dumbalk United	Toora		
1992	Fish Creek 14.12 (96)	Foster 7.14 (56)	Yarram	Tarwin		
1993	Foster 20.10 (130)	Won Wron-Woodside 9.6 (60)	Fish Creek	Meeniyan-Dumbalk United		
1994	Won Wron-Woodside 12.15 (87)	Fish Creek 5.10 (40)	Foster	Meeniyan-Dumbalk United		
1995	Devon-Welshpool 11.8 (74)	Won Wron-Woodside 10.8 (68)	Fish Creek	Foster		
1996	Devon-Welshpool 9.18 (72)	Inverloch-Kongwak 5.5 (35)	Dalyston	Foster	Meeniyan-Dumbalk United	
1997	Korumburra 17.14 (116)	Inverloch-Kongwak 13.7 (85)	Dalyston	Meeniyan-Dumbalk United	Fish Creek	
1998	Devon-Welshpool-Won Wron-Woodside 22.19 (151)	Meeniyan-Dumbalk United 14.10 (94)	Yarram	Korumburra	Fish Creek	
1999	Devon-Welshpool-Won Wron-Woodside 15.19 (109)	Fish Creek 10.10 (70)	Inverloch-Kongwak	Korumburra	Yarram	
2000	Fish Creek 13.6 (84)	Devon-Welshpool-Won Wron-Woodside 10.11 (71)	Dalyston	Korumburra	Inverloch-Kongwak	
2001	Fish Creek 14.11 (95)	Inverloch-Kongwak 11.6 (72)	Korumburra-Bena	Dalyston	Devon-Welshpool-Won Wron-Woodside	
2002	Fish Creek 18.12 (120)	Inverloch-Kongwak 13.13 (91)	Dalyston	Wonthaggi	Devon-Welshpool-Won Wron-Woodside	
2003	Devon-Welshpool-Won Wron-Woodside 13.14 (92)	Fish Creek 12.12 (84)	Dalyston	Wonthaggi	Meeniyan-Dumbalk United	
2004	Tarwin 6.13 (49)	Meeniyan-Dumbalk United 2.5 (17)	Fish Creek	Stony Creek	Devon-Welshpool-Won Wron-Woodside	
2005	Wonthaggi 15.8 (98)	Fish Creek 11.12 (78)	Devon-Welshpool-Won Wron-Woodside	Tarwin	Yarram	Korumburra-Bena
2006	Wonthaggi 20.13 (133)	Yarram 14.15 (99)	Devon-Welshpool-Won Wron-Woodside	Foster	Korumburra-Bena	Tarwin
2007	Yarram 16.10 (106)	Wonthaggi 14.13 (97)	Inverloch-Kongwak	Toora	Tarwin	Phillip Island
2008	Wonthaggi 18.20 (128)	Yarram 10.11 (71)	Phillip Island	Tarwin	Dalyston	Korumburra-Bena
2009	Stony Creek 14.10 (94)	Wonthaggi 11.14 (80)	Korumburra-Bena	Yarram	Tarwin	Phillip Island
2010	Foster 13.20 (98)	Stony Creek 11.8 (74)	Phillip Island	Fish Creek	Tarwin	Korumburra-Bena
2011	Kilcunda-Bass 13.3 (81)	Foster 7.15 (57)	Korumburra-Bena	Fish Creek	Meeniyan-Dumbalk United	Stony Creek
2012	Kilcunda-Bass 12.17 (89)	Dalyston 11.4 (70)	Fish Creek	Korumburra-Bena	Foster	Inverloch-Kongwak
2013	Kilcunda-Bass 18.10 (118)	Korumburra-Bena 12.10 (82)	Dalyston	Fish Creek	Yarram	Phillip Island
2014	Phillip Island 17.16 (118)	Dalyston 11.07 (73)	Kilcunda-Bass	Inverloch-Kongwak	Korumburra-Bena	Fish Creek
2015	Dalyston 21.9 (135)	Fish Creek 8.5 (53)	Phillip Island	Stony Creek	Meeniyan-Dumbalk United	Inverloch-Kongwak
2016	Fish Creek 6.15 (51)	Inverloch-Kongwak 4.10 (34)	Dalyston	Foster	Kilcunda-Bass	Stony Creek
2017	Fish Creek 17.10 (112)	Toora 10.9 (69)	Devon-Welshpool-Won Wron-Woodside	Stony Creek		
2018	Fish Creek 14.12 (96)	Foster 6.6 (42)	Stony Creek	Toora		
2019	Foster 8.7 (55)	Stony Creek 7.6 (48)	Fish Creek	Toora		

== Peter Moore Medallists (Best and fairest winners) ==
Year	Player	Team	Votes
1947	Jack Mitchell	Foster	18½
1948	Noel Ross	Foster	32½
1949	Jack Mitchell	Foster	14½
1950	Joe Malone	Foster	26
1951	Joe Malone	Foster	20
1952	Ben Davis	Won Wron	15
1953	Stan O'Neill	Devon	25
1954	Brian Reid	Yarram	22
1955	Stan O'Neill	Devon	24
1956	Leo Clarke	Woodside	23
1957	Ken May	Won Wron	20
1958	Hugh Davis	Foster	18
1959	Pat Lithgow	Devon	19
1960	Ron Standfield	Fish Creek	17
1960	Ian Crewes	Devon	17
1961	Ernie Taylor	Won Wron	19
1962	George Howlett	Woodside	20
1963	Gary Clavarino	Foster	21
1964	Jeff Standfield	Fish Creek	14
1965	Gary Clavarino	Foster	22
1966	Gary Clavarino	Foster	28
1967	Gary Clavarino	Foster	21
1968	John Fellows	Fish Creek	21
1969	Paul Sutherland	Welshpool	24
1970	John Burleigh	Yarram	21
1971	Don McKnight	Stony Creek	30
1972	Ross Smith	Won Wron	19
1972	Paul Sutherland	Welshpool	19
1973	Angus Hume	Toora	31
1974	Graham Anderson	Foster	28
1975	Alan Lowe	Devon	23
1976	Peter Lynch	Yarram	23
1977	Wayne Lynch	Yarram	29
1978	Wayne Lynch	Devon	29
1979	Alan Lowe	Woodside	24
1979	Chris Aitken	Welshpool	24
1980	Rod McRae	Toora	29
1981	Neil Park	Fish Creek	18
1981	John Johnston	Toora	18
1982	Trevor Young	Toora	19
1983	John Pellicano	Meeniyan-Dumbalk United	23
1984	Robert Davies	Foster	19
1984	Paul Clavarino	Yarram	19
1984	Wayne Withworth	Fish Creek	19
1985	Rohan Burke	Yarram	24
1986	Paul Clavarino	Yarram	27
1987	Wayne Weidemann	Fish Creek	25
1988	Paul Heppell	Meeniyan-Dumbalk United	25
1989	Peter Lynch	Yarram	28
1990	Greg Ryan	Toora	26
1991	Wayne Lynch	Welshpool	21
1992	Henry Bergervoet	Won Wron-Woodside	23
1993	Henry Bergervoet	Won Wron-Woodside	25
1994	Brendan Littler	Won Wron-Woodside	21
1995	Nicholas Shaw	Fish Creek	23
1996	Phil Pavey	Devon-Welshpool	24
1996	Justin Paul	Wonthaggi	24
1997	Glen Garner	Devon-Welshpool-Won Wron-Woodside	25
1998	Tim Harris	Meeniyan-Dumbalk United	30
1999	Anthony Knox	Korumburra	19
2000	Marshall Livingstone	Fish Creek	27
2001	Barry Standfield	Fish Creek	29
2002	Neil De Santis	Inverloch-Kongwak	24
2003	David Baldi	Meeniyan-Dumbalk United	26
2004	Brad Hutchinson	Stony Creek	31
2005	Brett Anthony	Kilcunda-Bass	31
2006	Mark Bradley	Korumburra-Bena	32
2007	Griffin Underwood	Yarram	27
2008	James Ross	Dalyston	32
2009	Aaron Ware	Wonthaggi	20
2010	Shaun Everington	Foster	30
2011	Shaun Everington	Foster	24
2012	Travis Manne	Fish Creek	21
2013	Mark Bradley	Korumburra-Bena	26
2014	Chris Endres	Kilcunda-Bass	25
2015	Brendan Kimber	Phillip Island	31
2016	Chris Endres	Kilcunda-Bass	27
2016	Tom Cameron	Fish Creek	27
2017	Callum Park	Fish Creek	25
2017	Ben Wells	Toora	25
2018	Ethan Park	Fish Creek	20
2018	Jesse Manton	Toora	20
2019	Darcy Atkins	Stony Creek	20

== Century Goal Kickers ==
Year	Player	Team	Goals (Incl. finals)
1957	Ben Davis	Won Wron	103
1970	Ron Tibballs	Welshpool	117
1972	Kevin Foat	Woodside	119
1974	Kevin Foat	Woodside	116
1977	Harry Skreja	Yarram	113
1978	Daniel Dwyer	Woodside	103
1983	Robert Profitt	Devon	116
1983	Daniel Dwyer	Won Wron-Woodside	110
1990	Andrew Young	Fish Creek	124
1992	Craig Hams	Foster	129
1994	Peter Anderson	Won Wron-Woodside	131
1995	Peter Anderson	Won Wron-Woodside	112
1996	Justin Paul	Wonthaggi	116
1996	Glen Martin	Inverloch-Kongwak	104
1997	Phil Bramley	Yarram	105
2002	Rodney Tack	Dalyston	119
2004	Lucas McMillan	Stony Creek	111
2006	Rodney Tack	Wonthaggi	135
2006	Barry Standfield	Fish Creek	102
2011	Luke James	Kilcunda-Bass	119
2011	Tom Bartholomew	Foster	110
2013	Kael Bergles	Kilcunda-Bass	121
2015	Michael Kraska	Dalyston	128
2015	Beau Runnalls	Phillip Island	106
2017	Kael Bergles	Devon-Welshpool-Won Wron-Woodside	122

== Final standings ==
=== 2004 Ladder ===
Alberton FL	Wins	Byes	Losses	Draws	For	Against	%	Pts
Meeniyan Dumbalk United	17	0	1	0	1878	1126	166.79%	68
Tarwin	14	0	4	0	1970	1144	172.20%	56
Fish Creek	14	0	4	0	1760	1331	132.23%	56
Stony Creek	12	0	6	0	1795	1252	143.37%	48
DWWWW	11	0	7	0	1453	1263	115.04%	44
Dalyston	10	0	8	0	1375	1241	110.80%	40
Korumburra-Bena	8	0	10	0	1488	1170	127.18%	32
Inverloch-Kongwak	7	0	11	0	1497	1412	102.06%	28
Wonthaggi Rovers	5	0	12	1	1121	1581	70.90%	22
Yarram	5	0	13	0	1132	1527	74.13%	20
Foster	2	0	15	1	1037	1928	53.79%	10
Toora & District	2	0	16	0	856	2387	35.86%	8

FINALS

Qualifying Final at Wonthaggi
2	Tarwin	13.8 (86)
3	Fish Creek	12.6 (78)
4	Stony Creek	20.18 (138)
5	DWWWW	9.11 (65)

Second semi-final at Fish Creek
1	Meeniyan Dumbalk Utd.	19.13 (127)
Tarwin	19.14 (128)
First semi-final at Tarwin Lower
Fish Creek	18.10 (118)
Stony Creek	12.12 (84)

Preliminary final
Meeniyan Dumbalk Utd.	13.11 (89)
Fish Creek	11.16 (82)

Grand Final at Foster
Tarwin	6.12 (49)
Meeniyan Dumbalk Utd.	2.5 (17)

=== 2007 Ladder ===
Alberton FL	Wins	Byes	Losses	Draws	For	Against	%	Pts
Wonthaggi Power	17	0	1	0	2315	896	258.37%	68
Yarram	17	0	1	0	2009	896	224.22%	68
Toora & District	12	0	6	0	1757	1314	133.71%	48
Tarwin	10	0	8	0	1620	1385	116.97%	40
Inverloch-Kongwak	9	0	8	1	1268	1384	91.62%	38
Phillip Island	9	0	9	0	1297	1244	104.26%	36
Kilcunda-Bass	9	0	9	0	1476	1524	96.85%	36
Fish Creek	8	0	9	1	1387	1551	89.43%	34
Dalyston	8	0	10	0	1442	1478	97.56%	32
Stony Creek	7	0	10	1	1245	1476	84.35%	30
Korumburra-Bena	7	0	11	0	1134	1423	79.69%	28
Foster	6	0	11	1	1309	1588	82.43%	24
Devon-Welshpool-Won Wron-Woodside	4	0	14	0	1067	2138	49.91%	16
Meeniyan Dumbalk United	1	0	17	0	886	1915	46.27%	4

FINALS

Week One
First Elimination Final at Korumburra
3	Toora & District	18.19 (127)
6	Phillip Island	8.8 (56)
Second Elimination Final at Dalyston
4	Tarwin	10.10 (70)
5	Inverloch-Kongwak	14.10 (94)

Week Two
Second semi-final at Tarwin Lower
1	Wonthaggi Power	12.12 (84)
2	Yarram	14.19 (103)
First semi-final at Wonthaggi
Toora & District	10.13 (73)
Inverloch-Kongwak	13.13 (91)

Week Three
Preliminary Final at Fish Creek
Wonthaggi Power	12.8 (134)
Inverloch-Kongwak	5.6 (36)

Week Four
Grand Final at Foster
Yarram	16.10 (106)
Wonthaggi Power	14.13 (97)

=== 2008 Ladder ===
Alberton FL	Wins	Byes	Losses	Draws	For	Against	%	Pts
Wonthaggi Power	18	0	0	0	2088	883	236.47%	72
Yarram	14	0	4	0	1783	1187	150.21%	56
Dalyston	13	0	5	0	1810	1451	124.74%	52
Tarwin	12	0	6	0	2190	1441	151.98%	48
Korumburra-Bena	12	0	6	0	1710	1359	125.83%	48
Phillip Island	11	0	7	0	1568	1216	128.95%	44
Inverloch-Kongwak	9	0	9	0	1569	1247	125.82%	36
Stony Creek	9	0	9	0	1549	1525	101.57%	36
Fish Creek	9	0	9	0	1382	1400	98.71%	36
Toora & District	8	0	10	0	1550	1503	103.13%	32
Kilcunda Bass	6	0	12	0	1571	1781	88.21%	24
Meeniyan-Dumbalk United	3	0	15	0	1063	2120	50.14%	12
Foster	2	0	16	0	1450	2038	71.15%	8
Devon-Welshpool-Won Wron-Woodside	0	0	18	0	784	2916	26.89%	0

FINALS

Week One
First Elimination Final at Korumburra
3	Dalyston	16.8 (104)
6	Phillip Island	17.6 (108)
Second Elimination Final at Fish Creek
4	Tarwin	19.14 (128)
5	Korumburra-Bena	8.8 (56)

Week Two
Second semi-final at Tarwin Lower
1	Wonthaggi Power	20.8 (128)
2	Yarram	10.4 (64)
First semi-final at Wonthaggi
Tarwin	7.7 (49)
Phillip Island	6.16 (52)

Week Three
Preliminary Final at Fish Creek
Yarram	21.24 (150)
Phillip Island	7.10 (52)

Week Four
Grand Final at Foster
Wonthaggi Power	18.20 (128)
Yarram	10.11 (71)

=== 2009 Ladder ===
Alberton FL	Wins	Byes	Losses	Draws	For	Against	%	Pts
Wonthaggi Power	16	0	2	0	2012	948	212.24%	64
Korumburra-Bena	15	0	3	0	1825	1061	172.01%	60
Stony Creek	14	0	4	0	1590	1086	146.41%	56
Yarram	13	0	5	0	1664	1252	132.91%	52
Tarwin	12	0	6	0	1641	1241	132.23%	48
Phillip Island	11	0	7	0	1559	1325	117.66%	44
Foster	9	0	9	0	1551	1373	112.96%	36
Dalyston	9	0	9	0	1481	1511	98.01%	36
Inverloch-Kongwak	7	0	11	0	1224	1267	96.61%	28
Kilcunda Bass	7	0	11	0	1140	1446	78.84%	28
Toora & District	5	0	13	0	1029	1541	66.77%	20
Fish Creek	3	0	15	0	1177	1814	64.88%	12
Meeniyan-Dumbalk United	3	0	15	0	1217	1875	64.91%	12
Devon-Welshpool-Won Wron-Woodside	2	0	16	0	804	2174	36.98%	8

FINALS

Week One
First Elimination Final at Wonthaggi
3	Stony Creek	11.11 (77)
6	Phillip Island	7.5 (47)
Second Elimination Final at Stony Creek
4	Yarram	12.10 (82)
5	Tarwin	7.17 (59)

Week Two
Second semi-final at Tarwin Lower
1	Wonthaggi Power	12.17 (89)
2	Korumburra-Bena	8.3 (51)
First semi-final at Inverloch
Stony Creek	9.17 (71)
Yarram	9.10 (64)

Week Three
Preliminary Final at Fish Creek
Korumburra-Bena	11.13 (79)
Stony Creek	15.14 (104)

Week Four
Grand Final at Foster
Wonthaggi Power	11.14 (80)
Stony Creek	14.10 (94)

=== 2010 Ladder ===
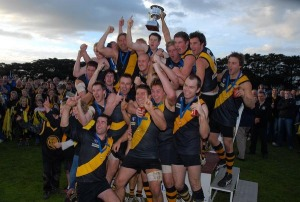
Foster after winning the 2010 Alberton Football League grand final.

Alberton FL	Wins	Byes	Losses	Draws	For	Against	%	Pts
Foster	17	2	1	0	2367	966	245.03%	68
Stony Creek	15	2	2	1	1526	978	156.03%	62
Phillip Island	12	2	6	0	1737	916	189.63%	48
Tarwin	11	2	7	0	1744	1150	151.65%	44
Fish Creek	11	2	7	0	1544	1267	121.86%	44
Korumburra-Bena	10	2	7	1	1540	1123	137.13%	42
Meeniyan-Dumbalk United	10	2	8	0	1687	1320	127.80%	40
Kilcunda Bass	9	2	9	0	1631	1348	120.99%	36
Yarram	8	2	10	0	1466	1310	111.91%	32
Inverloch-Kongwak	8	2	10	0	1521	1510	100.73%	32
Dalyston	3	2	15	0	1325	1738	76.24%	12
Toora & District	2	2	16	0	752	2219	33.89%	8
Devon-Welshpool-Won Wron-Woodside	0	2	18	0	497	3492	14.23%	0

FINALS

Week One
First Elimination Final at Foster
3	Phillip Island	8.9 (57)
6	Korumburra-Bena	6.4 (40)
Second Elimination Final at Stony Creek
4	Tarwin	4.5 (29)
5	Fish Creek	6.9 (45)

Week Two
Second semi-final at Tarwin Lower
1	Foster	11.9 (75)
2	Stony Creek	12.11 (83)
First semi-final at Meeniyan
Phillip Island	11.11 (77)
Fish Creek	6.5 (41)

Week Three
Preliminary Final at Fish Creek
Foster	9.15 (69)
Phillip Island	10.4 (64)

Week Four
Grand Final at Inverloch
Stony Creek	11.8 (74)
Foster	13.20 (98)

=== 2011 Ladder ===
Alberton FL	Wins	Byes	Losses	Draws	For	Against	%	Pts
Kilcunda Bass	16	2	2	0	2367	966	245.03%	64
Foster	14	2	4	0	1526	978	156.03%	56
Korumburra-Bena	13	2	5	0	1737	916	189.63%	52
Fish Creek	12	2	6	0	1744	1150	151.65%	48
Meeniyan-Dumbalk United	12	2	6	0	1544	1267	121.86%	48
Stony Creek	12	2	6	0	1540	1123	137.13%	48
Dalyston	10	2	8	0	1687	1320	127.80%	40
Inverloch-Kongwak	10	2	8	0	1631	1348	120.99%	40
Yarram	7	2	11	0	1466	1310	111.91%	28
Phillip Island	5	2	13	0	1521	1510	100.73%	20
Tarwin	5	2	13	0	1325	1738	76.24%	20
Toora & District	1	2	17	0	752	2219	33.89%	4
Devon-Welshpool-Won Wron-Woodside	0	2	18	0	497	3492	14.23%	0

FINALS

Week One
First Elimination Final at Cowes
3	Korumburra-Bena	16.10 (106)
6	Stony Creek	12.6 (78)
Second Elimination Final at Yarram
4	Fish Creek	16.10 (106)
5	Meeniyan Dumbalk Utd.	10.10 (70)

Week Two
Second semi-final at Korumburra
1	Kilcunda-Bass	16.13 (109)
2	Foster	15.11 (101)
First semi-final at Foster
Korumburra-Bena	11.12 (78)
Fish Creek	9.11 (65)

Week Three
Preliminary Final at Tarwin Lower
Foster	17.9 (111)
Korumburra-Bena	6.14 (50)

Week Four
Grand Final at Inverloch
Kilcunda-Bass	13.3 (81)
Foster	7.15 (57)

=== 2012 Ladder ===
Alberton FL	Wins	Byes	Losses	Draws	For	Against	%	Pts
Fish Creek	15	0	2	1	1898	1013	187.36%	62
Kilcunda Bass	15	0	3	0	1653	1048	157.73%	60
Dalyston	13	0	5	0	1582	1116	141.76%	52
Korumburra-Bena	11	0	7	0	1517	1163	130.44%	44
Foster	10	0	7	1	1547	1499	103.20%	42
Inverloch-Kongwak	10	0	8	0	1717	1271	135.09%	40
Phillip Island	10	0	8	0	1458	1186	122.93%	40
Tarwin	9	0	9	0	1457	1164	125.17%	36
Yarram	9	0	9	0	1477	1454	101.58%	36
Meeniyan-Dumbalk United	7	0	11	0	1367	1280	106.80%	28
Stony Creek	6	0	12	0	1248	1220	102.30%	24
Devon-Welshpool-Won Wron-Woodside	1	0	17	0	736	2345	31.39%	4
Toora & District	0	0	18	0	637	2535	25.13%	0

FINALS

Week One
First Elimination Final at Fish Creek
3	Dalyston	11.7 (73)
6	Inverloch-Kongwak	5.6 (36)
Second Elimination Final at Yarram
4	Korumburra-Bena	10.17 (77)
5	Foster	9.5 (59)

Week Two
Second semi-final at Foster
1	Fish Creek	9.13 (67)
2	Kilcunda-Bass	11.11 (77)
First semi-final at Cowes
Dalyston	20.10 (130)
Korumburra-Bena	15.12 (102)

Week Three
Preliminary Final at Tarwin Lower
Fish Creek	3.14 (32)
Dalyston	8.10 (58)

Week Four
Grand Final at Foster
Kilcunda-Bass	12.17 (89)
Dalyston	11.4 (70)

=== 2013 Ladder ===
Alberton FL	Wins	Byes	Losses	Draws	For	Against	%	Pts
Kilcunda Bass	16	2	2	0	2126	932	228.11%	64
Dalyston	16	2	2	0	1767	911	193.96%	72
Phillip Island	13	2	4	1	1674	987	169.60%	62
Yarram	14	1	3	1	1725	1067	161.67%	62
Korumburra-Bena	13	2	5	0	1844	977	188.74%	60
Fish Creek	12	2	6	0	1644	1103	149.05%	56
Inverloch-Kongwak	8	2	10	0	1238	1170	105.81%	40
Stony Creek	7	2	11	0	1384	1127	122.80%	36
Tarwin	6	2	12	0	851	1824	46.66%	32
Foster	6	1	12	0	1175	1443	81.43%	28
Meeniyan-Dumbalk United	3	2	15	0	937	1755	53.39%	20
Toora & District	2	2	16	0	834	1932	43.17%	16
Devon-Welshpool-Won Wron-Woodside	0	2	18	0	514	2485	20.68%	8

FINALS

Week One
First Elimination Final at Korumburra
3	Yarram	5.7 (37)
6	Fish Creek	7.6 (48)
Second Elimination Final at Alberton West
4	Phillip Island	3.7 (25)
5	Korumburra-Bena	7.8 (50)

Week Two
Second semi-final at Cowes
1	Kilcunda-Bass	15.10 (100)
2	Dalyston	9.8 (62)
First semi-final at Toora
Fish Creek	9.8 (62)
Korumburra-Bena	17.10 (112)

Week Three
Preliminary Final at Tarwin Lower
Dalyston	8.12 (60)
Korumburra-Bena	15.18 (108)

Week Four
Grand Final at Wonthaggi
Kilcunda-Bass	18.10 (118)
Korumburra-Bena	12.10 (82)

=== 2014 Ladder ===
Alberton FL	Wins	Byes	Losses	Draws	For	Against	%	Pts	Final	Team	G	B	Pts	Team	G	B	Pts
Kilcunda Bass	13	3	3	0	1440	813	177.12%	64	Elimination	Phillip Island	19	22	136	Fish Creek	8	6	54
Dalyston	12	3	4	0	1461	826	176.88%	60	Qualifying	Inverloch-Kongwak	13	13	91	Korumburra-Bena	12	12	84
Phillip Island	11	3	5	0	1216	850	143.06%	56	1st semi	Phillip Island	24	15	159	Inverloch-Kongwak	7	8	50
Korumburra-Bena	9	3	7	0	1238	906	136.64%	48	2nd semi	Dalyston	14	20	104	Kilcunda Bass	14	9	93
Inverloch-Kongwak	9	3	7	0	1219	952	128.05%	48	Preliminary	Phillip Island	14	13	97	Kilcunda Bass	10	4	64
Fish Creek	8	3	8	0	975	1189	82.00%	44	Grand	Phillip Island	17	16	118	Dalyston	11	7	73
Meeniyan-Dumbalk United	8	3	8	0	953	1191	80.02%	44									
Tarwin	6	3	10	0	981	1256	78.11%	36									
Stony Creek	6	3	10	0	842	1227	68.62%	36									
Toora & District	4	3	12	0	753	1288	58.46%	28									
Foster	2	3	14	0	750	1330	56.39%	20									

Week One
First Elimination Final at Bass
3	Phillip Island	19.22 (136)
6	Fish Creek	8.6 (54)
Second Elimination Final at Fish Creek
4	Korumburra-Bena	12.12 (84)
5	Inverloch-Kongwak	13.13 (91)

Week Two
Second semi-final at Cowes
1	Dalyston	14.20 (104)
2	Kilcunda-Bass	14.9 (93)
First semi-final at Stony Creek
Phillip Island	24.15 (159)
Inverloch-Kongwak	7.8 (50)

Week Three
Preliminary Final at Inverloch
Kilcunda-Bass	10.4 (64)
Phillip Island	14.13 (97)

Week Four
Grand Final at Meeniyan
Dalyston	11.7 (73)
Phillip Island	17.16 (118)

=== 2015 Ladder ===
Alberton FL	Wins	Byes	Losses	Draws	For	Against	%	Pts	Final	Team	G	B	Pts	Team	G	B	Pts
Dalyston	18	0	0	0	2292	659	347.80%	72	Elimination	Fish Creek	9	13	67	Meeniyan-Dumbalk United	9	10	64
Phillip Island	15	0	3	0	1911	841	227.23%	60	Qualifying	Stony Creek	15	19	109	Inverloch-Kongwak	7	9	51
Stony Creek	12	0	5	1	1306	890	146.74%	50	1st semi	Fish Creek	11	14	80	Stony Creek	3	12	30
Fish Creek	12	0	6	0	1716	1299	132.10%	48	2nd semi	Dalyston	10	5	65	Phillip Island	2	3	15
Meeniyan-Dumbalk United	12	0	6	0	1322	1141	115.86%	48	Preliminary	Fish Creek	13	16	94	Phillip Island	7	18	60
Inverloch-Kongwak	9	0	9	0	1200	1402	85.59%	36	Grand	Dalyston	21	9	135	Fish Creek	8	5	53
Foster	8	0	10	0	991	1293	76.64%	32									
Kilcunda Bass	6	0	11	1	1095	1455	75.26%	26									
Tarwin	6	0	12	0	1178	1222	96.40%	24									
DWWWW	5	0	13	0	1009	1489	67.76%	20									
Toora & District	3	0	15	0	784	1687	46.47%	12									
Korumburra-Bena	1	0	17	0	635	2061	30.81%	4									

Week One
First Elimination Final at Alberton West
3	Stony Creek	15.19 (109)
6	Inverloch-Kongwak	7.9 (51)
Second Elimination Final at Foster
4	Fish Creek	9.13 (67)
5	Meeniyan Dumbalk Utd.	9.10 (64)

Week Two
Second semi-final at Korumburra
1	Dalyston	10.5 (65)
2	Phillip Island	2.3 (15)
First semi-final at Toora
Stony Creek	3.12 (30)
Fish Creek	11.14 (80)

Week Three
Preliminary Final at Tarwin Lower
Phillip Island	7.18 (60)
Fish Creek	13.16 (94)

Week Four
Grand Final at Meeniyan
Dalyston	21.9 (135)
Fish Creek	8.5 (53)

=== 2016 Ladder ===
Alberton FL	Wins	Byes	Losses	Draws	For	Against	%	Pts
Fish Creek	16	0	2	0	1828	997	183.35%	64
Dalyston	15	0	3	0	1885	957	196.97%	60
Foster	15	0	3	0	1627	945	172.17%	60
Inverloch-Kongwak	14	0	4	0	1820	863	210.89%	56
Kilcunda Bass	11	0	7	0	1451	1155	125.63%	44
Stony Creek	9	0	9	0	1067	1211	88.11%	36
DWWWW	8	0	10	0	1248	1522	82.00%	32
Phillip Island	6	0	12	0	1214	1346	90.19%	24
Toora & District	5	0	13	0	1192	1376	86.63%	20
Meeniyan-Dumbalk United	5	0	13	0	1091	1539	70.89%	20
Tarwin	3	0	14	1	972	1529	63.57%	14
Korumburra-Bena	0	0	17	1	431	2386	18.06%	2

Week One
First Elimination Final at Tarwin Lower
3	Foster	13.10 (88)
6	Stony Creek	7.7 (49)
Second Elimination Final at Dalyston
4	Inverloch-Kongwak	13.17 (95)
5	Kilcunda-Bass	4.7 (31)

Week Two
Second semi-final at Cowes
1	Fish Creek	13.9 (87)
2	Dalyston	11.11 (77)
First semi-final at Stony Creek
Foster	10.9 (69)
Inverloch-Kongwak	11.11 (77)

Week Three
Preliminary Final at Bass
Dalyston	11.7 (73)
Inverloch-Kongwak	13.13 (91)

Week Four
Grand Final at Meeniyan
Fish Creek	6.15 (51)
Inverloch-Kongwak	4.10 (34)

=== 2017 Ladder ===
Alberton FL	Wins	Byes	Losses	Draws	For	Against	%	Pts
Fish Creek	17	3	1	0	2187	784	278.95%	68
Devon-Welshpool-Won Wron-Woodside	12	3	6	0	1704	1015	167.88%	48
Toora & District	12	3	6	0	1656	1065	155.49%	48
Stony Creek	9	3	9	0	1127	1208	93.29%	36
Tarwin	9	3	9	0	1284	1472	87.23%	36
Foster	4	3	14	0	972	1541	63.08%	16
Meeniyan-Dumbalk United	0	3	18	0	574	2419	23.73%	0

FINALS

Semi-finals – Week 1
1	Fish Creek	9.9 (63)
2	DWWWW	6.4 (44)
3	Toora & District	19.11 (125)
4	Stony Creek	5.4 (34)

Preliminary – Week 2
2	DWWWW	8.13 (61)
3	Toora & District	11.6 (72)

Grand Final – Week 3
1	Fish Creek	17.10 (112)
3	Toora & District	10.9 (69)

=== 2018 Ladder ===
Alberton FL	Wins	Byes	Losses	Draws	For	Against	%	Pts
Fish Creek	14	1	2	0	1417	663	213.73%	56
Stony Creek	11	1	5	0	1345	764	176.05%	44
Foster	9	1	7	0	1180	883	133.64%	36
Toora	8	1	8	0	1072	1006	106.56%	32
Tarwin	6	1	10	0	869	1410	61.63%	24
Meeniyan-Dumbalk United	0	1	16	0	537	1694	31.70%	0

FINALS

Semi-finals – Week 1
1	Fish Creek	9.16 (70)
2	Stony Creek	10.8 (68)
3	Foster	8.4 (52)
4	Toora & District	6.11 (47)

Preliminary – Week 2
2	Stony Creek	12.7 (79)
3	Foster	12.8 (80)

Grand Final – Week 3
1	Fish Creek	14.12 (96)
3	Foster	6.6 (42)

=== 2019 Ladder ===
Alberton FL	Wins	Byes	Losses	Draws	For	Against	%	Pts
Foster	14	0	1	0	1411	589	239.56%	56
Stony Creek	10	0	5	0	950	860	110.47%	40
Fish Creek	9	0	6	0	1045	808	129.33%	36
Toora	5	0	10	0	912	1213	75.19%	20
Meeniyan-Dumbalk United	4	0	11	0	806	1098	73.41%	16
Tarwin	3	0	12	0	791	1347	58.72%	12

FINALS

2nd semi-final– Week 2 / 1st semi-final– Week 1
1	Foster	12.8 (80)
2	Stony Creek	8.5 (53)
3	Fish Creek	23.10 (148)
4	Toora & District	4.5 (29)

Preliminary – Week 3
2	Stony Creek	12.10 (82)
3	Fish Creek	7.5 (47)

Grand Final – Week 4
1	Foster	8.7 (55)
2	Stony Creek	7.6 (48)
