= Kedron Football Club =

Names
- Full name: Kedron Football Club
- Nickname(s): "Redlegs", "Leggers"
- Club song: "It's a grand old flag"

Club details
- Founded: 1937; 89 years ago
- Colours
- Competition: QFA Division 2 North QFAW Division 2 QFA Division 4 North
- President: Glenn Noy
- Coach: Men Seniors - Kym Mansell Men Seniors Assistants - Jackson Whicker, Liam Stanley Men Reserves - Lee Fathers & Jimmy Stewart Women Seniors - Travis McMain Women Seniors Assistant - Lachie Gray Men Division 4 - Jimmy O'Gorman
- Grounds: E.K.(Ted) Anderson Oval (capacity: 3,000)
- Terry (Tats) McMain Field Training Field

Uniforms
Home

Other information
- Official website: https://www.thekedronlions.com/

The Kedron Football Club is an Australian rules football club based in Kedron, Queensland.

Located on Brisbane's inner North, the Kedron Football Club works side by side with its sister club, the Kedron Districts Junior Football Club, to provide the opportunity for boys and girls, men and women, to play football across all age groups.

The Senior Club fields senior four teams in the South East Queensland Senior competition and the Junior Club fields numerous under age teams in the South East Queensland Junior competition.

The senior teams currently fielded are :-

- Women's team in QFAW Division 2
- Men's teams in QFA Division 2 (North) Seniors & Reserves
- Men's team in QFA Division 4 (North)

== History ==
=== Kedron Football Club ===
The Kedron Football Club was formed in 1937 by past pupils of Kedron and Wooloowin State Schools and debuted in the QANFL that year. Although nicknamed the Redlegs, their official emblem was the Lion and the club wore sky blue and red as their colours, however in 1982 they adopted the royal blue and red guernsey as worn by Melbourne Football Club. In both 1939 and 1940 they reached the Grand Final, losing to Windsor on each occasion. They made the Grand Final for the third successive year in 1941 and this time claimed their maiden premiership with a win over Mayne. Kedron, who won back to back premierships in 1943/44 and appeared in every Grand Final from 1946 to 1950, established themselves as Queensland's strongest club in the 1940s. In each of those premiership deciders, Kedron took on Windsor and came out on top in 1946 and 1948. After claiming another premiership in 1959, Kedron suffered a drought until 1980 when they beat Coorparoo by 48 points to win the Grand Final.

Furthermore, the Kedron Football Club holds the distinction of having nurtured Erwin Dorneau, the first born and bred Queenslander to play VFL/AFL football. In 1946 while playing for Kedron, Erwin Dorneau won the Col Loel-Mick Byles Trophy (predecessor of the Grogan Medal) for the QFL Best and Fairest and in 1948, having finished equal second for the Tassie Medal at the 1947 Hobart Carnival, he was recruited by South Melbourne.

=== Merger ===
In 1990 the Kedron Football Club and the Wilston-Grange Football Club formed a team known as the "Kedron Grange Football Team" to compete in the Queensland Australian Football League.

The amalgamated team was known as the "Demons" and wore the Wilston-Grange striped jersey with Kedron red socks. The club played for seven seasons in this form, losing the 1994 Grand Final to Morningside by two points.

At the end of 1996 the merged team disbanded with both parties to the merger relying on their junior clubs to continue in the underage competitions.

=== Senior Football Returns ===
Women's Football - In 2003 under the Kedron Junior Club's umbrella, Kedron fielded a team "The Lady Lions" in the newly formed senior women's competition. Kedron did not field a women's team in 2014/15 but in 2016, after a two year hiatus, senior women's football returned to E. K. Anderson Oval and in 2017 the team was runner up in the grand final.

On 25 August 2019 the Lady Lions met top of the ladder and flag favourite Burleigh Heads at Leyshon Park, Yeronga, for the QFAW Division 1 premiership. On that day, one of the proudest in the club's history, the Women of Kedron created their own piece of history by winning the Kedron Football Club's inaugural Women's premiership. This historic win was made more remarkable in that before round 15 the Lady Lions were outside the final four and won six games straight on their way to Grand Final glory. Final Score: Kedron 6.6 - 42 Burleigh Heads 5.8 - 38

Men's Football - Then by 2006 once again with the Junior Club's support after a 2 year merger between Strathpine, Mayne and Kedron to form 'Central Districts Cougars' Under 18s - based out of Kedron FC, a senior men's team returned to open age football via the Queensland State Association division. The men won the flag that year with captain Travis McMain winning League Best & Fairest and Denny 'Willo' Willoughby winning Leading Goalkicker for the season including a competition record of 18 goals in one game. Stevo Rees finished Runner Up by 1 goal. The team was runners up in 2010 and in 2015, playing in the QAFA (B) competition, they were undefeated premiers and as a consequence in 2016 the club fielded men's senior and reserves teams in the QAFA (A) competition.

Honours

Premierships

- QAFL: (7) 1941, 1943, 1944, 1946, 1948, 1959, 1980
- QFA: (2) 2007, 2010
- QFAW Division 1: (1) 2019

Grogan Medalists (6)

- Merv Dihm (Kedron) - 1960
- Tom Gould (Kedron) - 1963, 1965
- Gary Wah Hing (Kedron) - 1966
- Kelvin Mills (Kedron) - 1970
- Greg Packham (Kedron) - 1986
- Dean Warren (Kedron Grange) - 1993

AFL Queensland team of the Century (2)

- Gordon Phelan
- Norm Dare

AFL Queensland Hall of Fame (10)

- Norm Dare
- Erwin Dornau
- Brian Fallis
- Tom Gould
- Marc Housley
- Lindsay Jacob
- Kelvin Mills
- Gordon "Freckles" Phelan
- Barry Robert-Thompson
- Col Taylor
