= Bob Furler =

Australian rules footballer

Personal information
- Full name: Bobbie Mortimer Furler
- Born: 28 June 1918
- Died: 13 August 1998 (aged 80)
- Height: 175 cm (5 ft 9 in)
- Weight: 83 kg (183 lb)

Playing career^{1}
Years	Club	Games (Goals)
1938–40	North Adelaide	26 (?)
1945	Hawthorn	6 (0)
- ^{1} Playing statistics correct to the end of 1945.

Bobbie Mortimer Furler (28 June 1918 – 13 August 1998) was an Australian rules footballer who played for Hawthorn in the Victorian Football League (VFL).

Furler, who was a nephew of North Adelaide champion Percy Furler started his career in South Australia, playing at North Adelaide where he won the Most Consistent player trophy in 1940. After a few years service in the RAAF and the Australian Army, he played with Hawthorn. Furler's next port of call was CANFL club Ainslie in Canberra. He captain-coached Ainslie to the premiership in 1947. He represented the territory at the 1947 Hobart Carnival, in section two, and shared the Tassie Medal with Les McClements.
