= Keith Rosewarne =

Australian rules footballer (1924–2008)

Personal information
- Full name: Keith John Rosewarne
- Born: 18 July 1924; Windsor, Victoria
- Died: 23 May 2008 (aged 83); Dandenong North, Victoria
- Original team: St Kilda Thirds

Playing career^{1}
Years	Club	Games (Goals)
1946–1951	St Kilda	92 (151)
- ^{1} Playing statistics correct to the end of 1951.

Career highlights
- St Kilda Best and Fairest 1946; Victorian state representative 1947

Keith John Rosewarne (18 July 1924 – 23 May 2008) was an Australian rules footballer in the VFL.

== Family ==
The son of Raymond Edgar Rosewarne (1898–1984), and Ruby Beatrice Pearl Rosewarne (1900–1930), née Buckland, Keith John Rosewarne was born at Windsor, Victoria on 18 July 1924.

He married Mary Lorna Casey on 19 March 1949.

== Education ==
He was educated at Elwood Central School; and while there, was selected to represent Victoria in the 1938 Australian (Under 15) Schoolboys' Football Carnival, along with a number of other future VFL footballers, including Les Foote and Len McCankie.

== Football ==
=== St Kilda (VFL) ===
A local recruit, having played with the St Kilda Thirds before his military service, Rosewarne made his senior debut in 1946, winning the best and fairest award in his first season. He played as a rover and was a regular goalscorer, often kicking multiple goals in a match.

In 92 games with the club, he scored 150 goals for an otherwise unsuccessful team.

=== Victoria (VFL) ===
Rosewarne represented Victoria at the 1947 Hobart Carnival versus South Australia, and Queensland.

=== Ballarat North ===
His retirement from the VFL came in 1951 at the age of 27, and in early 1952 he was cleared to Ballarat North club.

== Military service ==
Rosewarne served during World War II in the Australian Army.

== See also ==
- 1947 Hobart Carnival
