= 1950 SAAFL season =

1950 premiership season
- Date: 22 April - 30 September
- Premiers: A1: Walkerville; A2: Riverside; A3: Rosewater
- Minor premiers: A1: Walkerville; A2: Flinders Park; A3: Rosewater
- Wooden spooners: A1: St. Peter's O.C. A2: Railways' Institute; A3: Prince Alfred O.C. B
- Best and fairest: A1 (Hone Medal): Colin Christopherson (Kelvinator); A2 (Chambers Medal): Bob Williams (Goodwood); A3 (McKay Medal): Les Long (Goodwood B)
- Leading goalkicker: A1: Ross Young (Walkerville) 62 goals A2: A3:

The 1950 SAAFL season was the 32nd season of the South Australian Amateur Football League (SAAFL).

The season commenced on 22 April and concluded on 30 September.

Pulteney O.S., Christian Brothers' O.C., and Queen's O.C. did not re-affiliate. King's O.C. also did not field a 'B' team. Flinders Park and Payneham had entered their 'B' teams, as well as University 'C'. This resulted in 29 teams, so A3 decreased to 9 teams. Each club was levied £30 for each team plus 2/- for each registered player.

The Football Trainers' Association sponsored for all trainers from all teams in the League, Association, Amateur League, and all League associated Junior Associations were able to be trained in first aid.

An amateur side was given the opportunity to field a combined side from all Amateur Council associations, to compete in the Australian National Football Carnival held from 19 to 29 July.

== A1 ==
=== Ladder ===
Pos	Team	Pld	W	L	D	PF	PA	Pts
1	Walkerville	18	16	2	0			32
2	Exeter	18	14	4	0			28
3	Woodville	18	14	4	0			28
4	University	18	13	5	0			26
5	Semaphore Central	18	13	5	0			26
6	Kelvinator	18	6	11	1			13
7	Colonel Light Gardens	18	5	13	0			10
8	Alberton Church United	18	4	14	0			8
9	King's O.C.	18	2	15	1			5
10	St. Peter's O.C.	18	2	16	0			4

=== Finals ===
==== Semi Finals ====
	Semi-finals
Saturday, 2 September	Walkerville 10.24 (84)	def.	Woodville 7.12 (54)	Payneham Oval
Saturday, 2 September	Exeter 10.10 (70)	drew with	University 10.10 (70)	Woodville Oval
Saturday, 9 September (Semi-Final Replay)	Exeter 8.15	def.	University 5.11	Glenelg Oval

==== Final ====
Saturday, 16 September	Walkerville	def.	Exeter	Thebarton Oval
1.1 (7); 1.4 (9); 4.9 (33); 5.12 (42)	Q1; Q2; Q3; Final	4.2 (26); 4.2 (26); 6.3 (39); 6.3 (39)
Beaton, Cocks, Thorpe, Young, Gubbins	Goals	R. Harvey 3, J. Sawford, R. Blackwell, A. Franklin
Young, Trickett, Ferfuson, Heylen	Best	Burness, Smith, Peters, Harvey, Franklin

== A2 ==
=== Ladder ===
Pos	Team	Pld	W	L	D	PF	PA	Pts
1	Flinders Park	18	15	3	0			30
2	Payneham	18	13	5	0			26
3	Teachers' College	18	12	5	1			25
4	Riverside	18	11	7	0			22
5	University B	18	8	10	0			16
6	Prince Alfred O.C.	18	7	10	1			15
7	Goodwood	18	7	11	0			14
8	Kenilworth	18	5	13	0			10
9	Scotch O.C.	18	2	16	0			4
10	Railways' Institute	18	0	18	0			0

=== Finals ===
==== Semi Finals ====
	Semi-finals
Saturday, 9 September	Flinders Park 14.9	def.	Teachers' College 8.8	Payneham Oval
Saturday, 9 September	Payneham 7.5	def. by	Riverside 10.9	Alberton Oval

==== Final ====
Saturday, 16 September	Flinders Park	def. by	Riverside	Alberton Oval
8.10 (58)	Q1; Q2; Q3; Final	9.8 (62)
Stacey, Searle, Roberts, Larkin	Best	Quinn, Johnson, Murray, Flynn

=== Challenge Final ===
Saturday, 23 September	Flinders Park	drew with	Riverside	Thebarton Oval (crowd: 2,000)
1.1 (7); 1.5 (11); 3.9 (27); 5.9 (39)	Q1; Q2; Q3; Final	0.0 (0); 2.4 (16); 3.5 (23); 5.9 (39)
Searle 2, Bergin, Larkin, Morgan	Goals	Gill, Green, Johnson, Quinn, Renton
Searle, Larkin, Balschin, Stacey, Roberts, Ronley	Best	Quinn, Peterson, Hutton, Flynn, Reeves, Clarke

=== Challenge Final Replay ===
Saturday, 30 September	Flinders Park	def. by	Riverside	Thebarton Oval
3.1 (19); 4.2 (26); 5.9 (39); 6.9 (45)	Q1; Q2; Q3; Final	1.1 (7); 5.5 (35); 6.5 (41); 10.12 (72)
Turner 3, Johncock, Morgan, Williams	Goals	Gill 2, Quinn 2, Murray 2, Hanson 2, Green, Clarke
Searle, Turner, Larkin, Ryan, Howell, Balchin	Best	Quinn, Flynn, Hanson, Gill, Stephens, Johnson

== A3 ==
=== Ladder ===
Pos	Team	Pld	W	L	D	PF	PA	Pts
1	Rosewater	16	16	0	0			32
2	Goodwood B	16	12	3	1			25
3	Postal Institute	16	10	5	1			21
4	Flinders Park B	16	9	7	0			18
5	Payneham B	16	7	9	0			14
6	University C	16	7	9	0			14
7	Teachers' College B	16	6	10	0			12
8	St. Peter's O.C. B	16	3	13	0			6
9	Prince Alfred O.C. B	16	2	14	0			4

=== Finals ===
==== Semi Finals ====
	Semi-finals
Saturday, 2 September	Rosewater 17.22	def.	Postal Institute 6.6	Goodwood Oval
Saturday, 2 September	Goodwood B 10.14	def.	Flinders Park B 9.14	Walkerville Oval

==== Final ====
Saturday, 9 September	Rosewater	def.	Goodwood B	Walkerville Oval
14.11 (95)	Q1; Q2; Q3; Final	10.12 (72)

== Representative ==
=== vs VAFA ===
June 12 at Norwood Oval

SAAFL
B:	J. Quinn (Riverside)	K. Sims (St. Peter's O.C.)	A. McLeod (University)
HB:	M. Natt (Exeter)	D. Brebner (University)	D. Polden (Woodville)
C:	K. Salvemini (Semaphore Central)	R. Wood (King's O.C.) capt.	A. Dowding (University)
HF:	C. Christensen (Exeter)	B. Seager (Payneham)	H. Pederson (Exeter)
F:	J. Harvey (Exeter) vice-capt.	M. Lyon (University)	J. Tapp (Exeter)
Foll:	P. Saunders (St. Peter's O.C.)	B. Cate (Walkerville)	P. Keough (Semaphore Central)
Res:	N. Johnson (Kelvinator)	F. Griffiths (Semaphore Central)	W. Iles (Exeter)
Coach:	Harold Page; manager: G.P. Wilson		

King's Birthday
Monday, 12 June	S.A.A.F.L.	def. by	V.A.F.A.	Norwood Oval (crowd: 1,500)
3.4 (22); 5.6 (36); 8.12 (60); 10.14 (74)	Q1; Q2; Q3; Final	2.4 (16); 10.6 (66); 14.11 (95); 21.14 (140)	Umpires: J.A. Johnson boundary: G.W. Bray and R.C. Hartland goal: C. Pridgart and A.K. Tucker
Harvey 3, Saunders 2, Lyon 2, Seager, Keough, Christensen	Goals	Anderson 6, Mellors 4, Faulkner 3, Cox 2, Birtles 2, Hibbins, Kirby, Stock, Meredith

=== vs S.A. Football Association ===
July 22 at Adelaide Oval as a curtain raiser to the SANFL second 18 vs Carlton.

SAAFL
B:	N. Johnson (Kelvinator)	K. Sims (St. Peter's O.C.) capt	H. Pederson (Exeter)
HB:	K. Seedsman (University)	D. Polden (Woodville)	C. Christopherson (Kelvinator)
C:	G. Elix (University)	F. Griffiths (Semaphore Central) vice-capt.	W. Iles (Exeter)
HF:	N. Trewin (Walkerville)	B. Seager (Payneham)	C. Christensen (Exeter)
F:	J. Walsh (University)	P. Saunders (St. Peter's O.C.)	R. Young (Walkerville)
Foll:	M. Burton (Semaphore Central)	J. Tapp (Exeter)	J. Edwards (Semaphore Central
Res:	G. Armfield (Woodville)	F. Trickett (Walkerville)	K. Salvemini (Semaphore Central)
Coach:	Harold Page; manager: G.P. Wilson		

Saturday, 22 July (12:15pm)	S.A.N.F.A.	def.	S.A.A.F.L.	Adelaide Oval
16.11 (107)	Q1; Q2; Q3; Final	9.10 (64)	Umpires: A.A. Cotton
Chapman 5, Hobbs 3, Loades 2, Moore 2, Edwards 2, McKenzie, Ford	Goals	Young 3, Edwards 2, Saunders 2, Seager, Walsh
Edwards, Chapman, Hobbs, Loades	Best	Edwards, Tapp, Saunders, Polden, Burton, Elix, Seedsman
S. Hobbs (assault)	Reports	S.A. Seager (assault)
