= 1947 Hobart Carnival =

Tournament information
- Sport: Australian football
- Location: Hobart, Australia
- Dates: 30 July 1947–6 August 1947
- Format: Round Robin
- Teams: 7

Final champion
- SECTION A: Victoria; SECTION B: Tasmania

The 1947 Hobart Carnival was the tenth edition of the Australian National Football Carnival, an Australian football interstate competition. It was held from the July 30 to August 9 and was the second time (first being 1924) to be held in Hobart with North Hobart Oval once again being the host stadium throughout the carnival.

The carnival was expanded to seven teams from the three that played in the previous edition which meant for the first time since 1908, the competition saw two sections. Section A being South Australia, VFL and Western Australia while Tasmania, New South Wales, Queensland and Canberra took part in Section B.

Western Australia caused an upset with a 4-point win over the VFL, the first time the Victorians had lost at a carnival since 1921. The VFL however claimed the Championship on percentage after easily accounting for South Australia by 76 points. Tasmania topped the Section B ladder to gain promotion to the top flight in the 1950 Brisbane Carnival.

== Summary ==
The 1947 carnival began with the opening ceremony which 14,082 people attended in what The Mercury described as a holiday with few people out on the Hobart streets after the luncheon hour. The opening ceremony featured each captain carrying the state pennant around North Hobart with the governor of Tasmania, Hugh Binney, formally announcing the carnival beginning. The opening match of the 1947 carnival was between New South Wales and Canberra with New South Wales cruising to an 80-point victory over the team from Canberra after scoring eight goals in the first quarter to the Canberrans two goals with the final score being 18.12 (130) to 7.8 (50). The second match of the double-header was much the same with the Tasmanian team giving systematic football to the home ground as Lance Collins scored nine goals in the team's 114 points thrashing over Queensland with an eight-goal term in the second quarter sealing a comfortable victory.

After a one-day break, the second round of Section B started on the 1 August with Tasmania taking on New South Wales. A crowd of 5,785 people attended the match which saw Tasmania defeat New South Wales by 10 points. This was after scores were level with the swing of the match in favor of New South Wales. But Tasmania found an extra gear with a goal to Terry Cashion from a dazzling run through the half-forward. Dave Challender later scored the last goal of the match to seal the victory. The following day saw inaccurate kicking from Canberra with poor position play and lack of cohesion but stayed in the match with Queensland giving opportunities away. It would not be until the final quarter where Queensland, 15 points down at three quarter time would play their best football with four goals giving Queensland an 11-point lead but was then wiped away with two goals from H. Madigan gave Canberra hope but it was not to be with Queensland getting a 10-point victory.

The second match of the day saw the first match of Section A between South Australia and Western Australia. With an almost record crowd of 14,867, the South Australians dominated Western Australia across the centre with the only period of play being in the third quarter where the Western Australians attacked vigorously. South Australia won the match by 36 points with the final scores being 20.18 (138) to 15.12 (102). The following day, Victoria played their first game of the Hobart Carnival, with Lindsay White kicking 11 goals in the Victorian demolition of Queensland with the final margin being 214 points with Queensland not scoring a single goal in the second half. The following match saw Tasmania take on Western Australia with the winner of the match staying in the A-division and be able to take on Victoria on Wednesday. For almost three quarters of the match, the Tasmanian's stayed close to Western Australia with them only being behind by 13 points at one stage of the final quarter. Western Australia though had the superior team which with the steadiness in attack lead them to a 44-point victory and staying in Division A.

Two more matches were played on the Wednesday, after South Australia defeated New South Wales by 71 points in the last inter-section game of the carnival, Western Australia and Victoria played in the second match of Section A. In what The Mercury described as worthy of the highest traditions of the game, the two teams battled throughout the match with Western Australia holding a five-point lead after the bell. Fred Fanning has the chance to win the game for Victoria but his shot went wide as WA won by four points. The Friday matches saw convincing wins from New South Wales and Tasmania who defeated Queensland and Canberra by 58 and 78 points respectively. This also meant Tasmania won the Division B title and would compete in Division A in the following carnival.

Before the final match of the carnival between Victoria and South Australia was played, a closing parade was arranged with the Tasmanians leading the teams out with Victoria and South Australia being the last ones out. A record crowd of 18,354 people who paid £2860 saw Victoria dominate the game with most of the interest being evapulated after half time as the South Australians had no answer to the Victorians who went on to win by 76 points.

== Results ==
=== Section B ===
	Section B
Wednesday, 30 July (11:30am)	New South Wales 18.22 (130)	def.	Canberra 7.8 (50)	North Hobart Oval (crowd: 14,082 (C-R))
Wednesday, 30 July (2:30pm)	Tasmania 22.26 (158)	def.	Queensland 6.8 (44)	North Hobart Oval (crowd: 14,082)
Friday, 1 August (2:30pm)	Tasmania 16.10 (106)	def.	New South Wales 13.18 (96)	North Hobart Oval (crowd: 5,785)
Saturday, 2 August (11:50am)	Canberra 7.24 (66)	def. by	Queensland 11.10 (76)	North Hobart Oval (crowd: 14,867 (C-R))
Friday, 8 August (12:00pm)	Queensland 5.12 (42)	def. by	New South Wales 14.12 (96)	North Hobart Oval (crowd: 2,997 (C-R))
Friday, 8 August (2:30pm)	Tasmania 21.10 (136)	def.	Canberra 9.6 (60)	North Hobart Oval (crowd: 2,997)

=== Section A ===
	Section A
Saturday, 2 August (2:30pm)	South Australia 20.18 (138)	def.	Western Australia 15.12 (102)	North Hobart Oval (crowd: 14,867)
Wednesday, 6 August (2:30pm)	Western Australia 16.10 (106)	def.	Victoria 15.12 (102)	North Hobart Oval (crowd: 5,442)
Saturday, 9 August (2:30pm)	South Australia 7.9 (51)	def. by	Victoria 18.19 (127)	North Hobart Oval (crowd: 18,354)

=== Inter-Section Matches ===
	Inter-Section Games
Monday, 4 August (12:00pm)	Queensland 2.7 (19)	def. by	Victoria 36.17 (233)	North Hobart Oval (crowd: 4,978 (C-R))
Monday, 4 August (2:30pm)	Tasmania 11.12 (78)	def. by	Western Australia 17.24 (126)	North Hobart Oval (crowd: 4,978)
Wednesday, 6 August (12:00pm)	New South Wales 5.10 (40)	def. by	South Australia 17.9 (111)	North Hobart Oval (crowd: 5,442 (C-R))

== Tassie Medal ==
Ranking	Player	Votes	Team
1	Les McClements	7	Western Australia
1	Bob Furler	7	Canberra
3	Bert Deacon	5	Victoria
3	Jim Matthews	5	New South Wales
3	Erwin Dornau	5	Queensland
6	Stan Heal	4	Western Australia
6	Lou Richards	4	Victoria

== Squads ==
=== Section A ===
VIC

Manager: K. Luke

- Phonse Kyne (Captain)
- Jack Graham (VC)
- Harold Bray
- Perc Bushby
- Wally Culpitt
- Kevin Curran
- Bert Deacon
- Kevin Dynon
- Fred Fanning
- Fred Flanagan
- Les Foote
- Jack Howell
- Bill Hutchison
- Noel Jarvis
- Billy King
- Len McCankie
- Marty McDonnell
- Shane McGrath
- Leo Merrett
- Max Oppy
- Lou Richards
- Keith Rosewarne
- Allan Ruthven
- Lindsay White
WA

Coach: J. Dolan

- Merv McIntosh (Captain)
- Bill O'Neill (VC)
- Bill Alderman
- Fred Buttsworth
- Harry Carbon
- Vic French
- Jack Green
- Len Harman
- Stan Heal
- Dave Ingraham
- Harold Jeffreys
- Norm Lamb
- Clive Lewington
- Les McClements
- Jack Murray
- Bernie Naylor
- George Prince
- Jack Reilly
- Sid Shaw
- Jack Sheedy
- Frank Sparrow
- Ray Starr
- Jack Sweet
- Ron Tucker
- Norm Wendt
SA

Manager W. Noal

- Bob Quinn (Captain)
- Bob Hank (VC)
- Norm Betson
- Garth Burkett
- Stan Cox
- Allan Crabb
- Sam Gallagher
- Alan Giles
- Colin Ingham
- Lyall Kretschmer
- Gil Langley
- Len Lapthorne
- Ross Lehmann
- William McFarlane
- Bob McLean
- Frank O'Leary
- Doug Olds
- Charlie Pyatt
- Jim Schober
- Reg Schumann
- Bernie Smith
- Colin Smith
- Edward Tilley
- Neville Way
- Fos Williams

=== Section B ===
TAS

Manager: K. Downie

- Lance Collins (Captain)
- Jack Sullivan (VC)
- Noel Atkins
- Terry Cashion
- Reg Castles
- Dave Challender
- Bert Chilcott
- Darrell Crosswell
- Lance Crosswell
- Darrell Eaton
- Leigh Gaunt
- Arthur Hodgson
- John Leedham
- Stan O'Neill
- Ernie Pinkington
- Terry Pullen
- Vern Rae
- Noel Reid
- Jervis Stokes
- Ray Summers
- Bert Waldron
- Lindsay Webb
- Ian Westell
- Morrie Williams
- Roy Witzerman
NSW

Manager: R. Onians

- Alan Smythe (Captain)
- Jim Cracknell (VC)
- Jack Browne
- Ken Champion
- Darcy Coleman
- Andy Davidson
- Bob Dryburgh
- Fred Edwards
- Fred Felstead
- A. Gillespie
- John Grose
- L. Grose
- Roy Hayes
- Joe Hughes
- Frank Larkin
- Eddie Luhrs
- Jim Matthews
- Roy Matthews
- Keith Miller
- Emrys Owen
- L. Simmons
- J. Stevens
- Jack Thomson
- Roy Watterston
- Roy Wilson
QLD

Manager C. Ryan

- Dick Parton (Captain)
- George Nuss (VC)
- K. Bone
- Harold Byrne
- Tom Calder
- D. Cranstoun
- Erwin Dornau
- R. Geschke
- F. Griffin
- A. Hollingsworth
- J. Hopkins
- L. Jackson
- Don Northover
- Gordon Phelan
- Doug Pittard
- C. Potter
- L. Sanders
- Col Taylor
- Phil Trewick
- Ken Trewick
- Jim Trewick
- Alan Trewick
- R. Warren
- F. Willetts
- R. Wixted
Canberra

Coach: Dave Elliman

- Alan Stevens (Captain)
- N. Custance (VC)
- C. Axelby
- J. Backen
- D. Berry
- R. Bloomfield
- J. Brophy
- J. Connelly
- Jack Dorman
- Alf Drayton
- L. Drayton
- H. Edlington
- Kevin Flynn
- Bob Furler
- R. Hawke
- K. Hill
- K. Hogan
- J. Hurley
- H. Madigan
- N. Malone
- R. Noonan
- G. Pini
- V. Ryan
- George Sharpe
- G. Sherd
