= Erwin Dornau =

Australian rules footballer

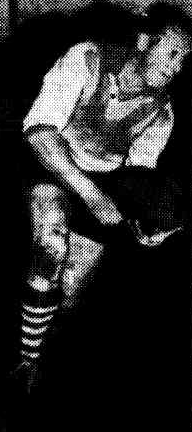

Personal information
- Full name: Erwin Dornau
- Born: 22 March 1926; Brisbane, Queensland
- Died: 23 September 2008 (aged 82); Melbourne, Victoria
- Original team: Kedron
- Height: 183 cm (6 ft 0 in)
- Weight: 86 kg (190 lb)
- Position: Centre half back

Playing career^{1}
| Years | Club | Games (Goals) |
| 1948–1952 | South Melbourne | 54 (8) |
- ^{1} Playing statistics correct to the end of 1952.

Erwin "Doe" Dornau (22 March 1926 – 23 September 2008) was an Australian rules footballer who played with South Melbourne in the Victorian Football League (VFL) during the late 1940s and early 1950s. Dornau was the first born and bred Queenslander in VFL/AFL history. Papers of the time spelled his first name as Irwin. What looked like a promising VFL career was cut short by leg injury. Though he was consistently among South's best talls and was named deputy captain in 1952, his last year at the club.

== Early life ==
Dornau was born in Brisbane, Queensland and attended Windsor State School, one of just 42 schools in the state where Australian rules was played. He first picked up the sport there being one of the very few children in the state who did not go on to play rugby, instead choosing to stick with Australian rules.

== QANFL and State representation ==
Dornau in 1947 during his QANFL career

Dornau played his senior football at Kedron where he was a standout centre half back who could kick equally well on either foot.

He represented Queensland at interstate football for the first time in 1946 and starred for them at centre half back in the 1947 Hobart Carnival, finishing equal second in the Tassie Medal. He also won the Col Loel-Mick Byles trophy as best player in the QANFL.

== VFL career ==
His efforts in Hobart saw him recruited to South Melbourne in 1948 at the age of 21, and after 3 months residency in Melbourne, qualified to transfer leagues making way for his debut on the half back flank against Richmond. He was named best on ground for South's in their match against Footscray.

His debut season was solid gaining eight Brownlow votes. However he suffered a serious knee injury that saw him sidelined for two seasons.

Upon return from injury in 1951, the club rested him in the ruck where he shared the position with Don Scott. However he soon sustained further injuries to his thigh and hand. His return to full fitness saw him take Ron Clegg's position at Centre half back however it was short lived with recurring injuries seeing him switched to the full back position. His leg injuries eventually put an end to his 1952 season and his VFL career.

After years of injury struggles, Dornau resigned from Souths despite being named South's deputy captain in his final season.

== Personal life ==
Following his VFL career, Dornau took up a position as player coach at the Leeton Football Club at Leeton in New South Wales Riverina.

Dornau died on 23 September 2008.
