= Barry Standfield =

Australian footballer (b.1970)

Personal information
- Full name: Barry Standfield
- Born: 13 February 1970 (age 56)
- Original team: Fish Creek
- Height: 193 cm (6 ft 4 in)
- Weight: 90 kg (198 lb)

Playing career^{1}
Years	Club	Games (Goals)
1990–1996	Footscray	98 (38)
1997	Adelaide	13 (23)
Total		111 (61)
- ^{1} Playing statistics correct to the end of 1997.

Barry Standfield (born 13 February 1970) is a former Australian rules footballer who played with Footscray and Adelaide in the Australian Football League (AFL) during the 1990s.

A key position player, Standfield spent seven seasons at Footscray but played 85 of his 98 games between 1992 and 1995, including six finals. Standfield snapped his Achilles tendon in a training incident prior to Round 4, ending his 1996 season. At the conclusion of the 1996 season, he was traded to Adelaide in the 1996 AFL draft, for picks 32 and 47 which were used on Jim Plunkett and Brett Montgomery.

On debut for Adelaide in the opening round of the 1997 AFL season, Standfield kicked five goals in a win over the Brisbane Lions. He also kicked a five-goal haul against his former club. Standfield lost his place in the team late in the season and missed out on participating in Adelaide's premiership.

After leaving the AFL, Standfield returned to Gippsland, where he had begun his career. He played with and coached Fish Creek in the Alberton Football League and won the 2001 Peter Moore Medal as the 'Best and Fairest' in the league.

In 2020, Standfield became the head coach of the Wilston Grange women's team in the QAFLW.
