= Jim Plunkett (Australian footballer) =

Australian rules footballer

Personal information
- Full name: Jim Plunkett
- Born: 26 July 1978 (age 48)
- Original team: Northern Knights
- Draft: 32nd, 1996 AFL draft
- Height: 179 cm (5 ft 10 in)
- Weight: 79 kg (174 lb)

Playing career^{1}
Years	Club	Games (Goals)
1999–2000	Western Bulldogs	10 (1)
2001–2003	Carlton	37 (14)
Total		47 (15)
- ^{1} Playing statistics correct to the end of 2003.

Jim Plunkett (born 26 July 1978) is a former Australian rules footballer who played with the Western Bulldogs and Carlton in the Australian Football League (AFL).

A midfielder, Plunkett played initially at Montmorency and was recruited from the Northern Knights. Selected with the 32nd pick of the 1996 AFL draft, he was part of a trade which saw Barry Standfield come to the Western Bulldogs. He spent two seasons in the reserves before making his AFL debut in 1999.

Plunkett was delisted by the Bulldogs at the end of the 2000 season but given another opportunity when he was rookie listed by Carlton. He put in a strong performance in the 2001 elimination final win over Adelaide, with 34 disposals and two goals. In 2002 he was a regular member of the team and played 18 games but was let go by the club after a poor showing the following season.

More recently, Plunkett has been involved in the Leading Teams leadership program, which helps sports and work groups with leadership techniques.
