= Max Parker (footballer) =

Australian rules footballer (born 1953)

Personal information
- Full name: Maxwell Sam Parker
- Born: 29 October 1953 (age 73)
- Original team: Welshpool (AFL)
- Height: 194 cm (6 ft 4 in)
- Weight: 89 kg (196 lb)

Playing career^{1}
Years	Club	Games (Goals)
1971	Footscray	5 (6)
1974–1987	Woodville	266 (102)
1988	North Adelaide	14 (5)
Total		285 (113)
- ^{1} Playing statistics correct to the end of 1988.

Maxwell Sam Parker (born 29 October 1953) is a former Australian rules footballer who played for Footscray in the Victorian Football League (VFL) and Woodville and North Adelaide in the South Australian National Football League (SANFL).

Parker was a ruckman when he arrived at Footscray from Alberton Football League (AFL) club Welshpool. As his new club already had established ruckmen in Gary Dempsey and Barry Round, Parker was tried as a key forward. He made five appearances for Footscray in the 1971 VFL season, as a 17 year old, kicking three goals against both North Melbourne and South Melbourne.

Unable to play a senior game in 1972, Parker returned to country football and played briefly at Gippsland Football League club Leongatha.

The rest of his career was spent in the SANFL. Playing mostly as a defender, Parker appeared in 266 games for Woodville over 14 seasons and was club captain in 1982, 1986 and 1987.

After leaving Woodville in acrimonious circumstances, Parker played his final league season with North Adelaide.

A three time South Australian representative, Parker retired with over 300 games of elite Australian rules football, including 21 pre-season/night series matches.
