= Neville Way =

Australian rules footballer and surgeon (1924–2018)

Personal information
- Full name: Neville James Way
- Born: 16 March 1924; Boulder, Western Australia
- Died: 13 June 2018 (aged 94); Salter Point, Western Australia
- Original team: Boulder City
- Height: 183 cm (6 ft 0 in)
- Weight: 87 kg (192 lb)

Playing career^{1}
Years	Club	Games (Goals)
1942	St Kilda	8 (7)
1944–1950	Norwood	87
- ^{1} Playing statistics correct to the end of 1950.

Neville James Way (16 March 1924 – 13 June 2018) was an Australian surgeon who also played Australian rules football with St Kilda in the Victorian Football League (VFL) and Norwood in the South Australian National Football League (SANFL).

Way grew up in the Western Australian goldfields and played football for Boulder City in the local league. In 1942, at the age of 18, he enlisted with the Royal Australian Navy and was sent to HMAS Cerberus in Victoria for training. During his time in Victoria, Way played eight VFL games for St Kilda, before discharging from the Navy at the year's end.

While he studied at the University of Adelaide during the 1940s, Way was one of the leading centre half-forwards of the SANFL, playing with Norwood. He was the leading goal-kicker at Norwood in 1945 with 39 goals and again in 1947 when he kicked 49 goals. The runner-up in the 1947 Magarey Medal count, Way also enjoyed team success, participating in Norwood's 1946 and 1950 premiership winning teams. He made a total of nine interstate appearances for South Australia, some of which came in the 1947 Hobart Carnival. Seven of his 19 interstate goals were kicked in South Australia's win over the VFL in 1945.

He went on to have a medical career, starting out at Royal Adelaide Hospital. In 1953 he moved to England for two years and qualified as a Fellow of the Royal College of Surgeons of England. When he came back to Australia he joined the Royal Perth Hospital where he worked as a general surgeon until his retirement in 1989.
