= Len McCankie =

Australian rules footballer

Personal information
- Full name: Len McCankie
- Born: 8 November 1924
- Died: 15 May 2003 (aged 78)
- Original team: North Footscray
- Height: 180 cm (5 ft 11 in)
- Weight: 85 kg (187 lb)

Playing career^{1}
Years	Club	Games (Goals)
1941–1950	Footscray	143 (10)
- ^{1} Playing statistics correct to the end of 1950.

Len McCankie (8 November 1924 – 15 May 2003) was an Australian rules footballer who played with Footscray in the Victorian Football League (VFL) during the 1940s.

McCankie, a half back and ruckman, was only 16 when he made his league debut in 1941. He represented the VFL in the 1947 Hobart Carnival, having also appeared at interstate level in 1945. During his time with Footscray he played in four semi finals but was never part of a winning finals team. At the end of the 1950 season, the then vice-captain was in the running to replace Arthur Olliver as playing coach but the job went to Charlie Sutton instead.

He instead took up the position of North Hobart captain-coach, leading them from 1951 to 1953, with the highlight being a grand final appearance in his first season. In 1953 he captain-coached Tasmania in the Adelaide Carnival and won the first ever Lefroy Medal. He was playing coach of Warrnambool in 1954 and from 1955 to 1956 coached Welshpool in the Alberton Football League.
