= Les McClements =

Australian rules footballer

Personal information
- Full name: Samuel Leslie McClements
- Born: 12 May 1922; Claremont, Western Australia
- Died: 27 October 1973 (aged 51); Hobart, Tasmania
- Position: Ruckman

Playing career^{1}
Years	Club	Games (Goals)
1941–1950	Claremont	108
1951–1955	Clarence	?
- ^{1} Playing statistics correct to the end of 1955.

Samuel Leslie McClements (12 May 1922 – 27 October 1973) was an Australian rules footballer who played for Claremont in the West Australian National Football League (WANFL) and in Tasmania with Clarence.

Although not the tallest going around, McClements played as a ruckman and was Claremont's 'Best and fairest' winner every year from 1946 to 1950. He was unlucky not to play in a premiership as his career began the year after Claremont's strongest era where they won three successive flags. McClements represented Western Australia at the 1947 Hobart Carnival, starring in their upset win over the VFL and sharing the Tassie Medal with Bob Furler of Canberra.

In Tasmania he was a good performer for Clarence, where he won two 'Best and fairest' awards and earned selection in the Tasmanian squad for the 1953 Adelaide Carnival. Three years earlier he had represented Western Australia at the Brisbane Carnival. When not playing football he worked as a truck driver for a hardware firm. He served with the 9th Division of the Australian Army during World War II, and was a member of an army football side that defeated an RAAF side in Adelaide in 1945.

His niece Lyn McClements is a gold-medal-winning Olympic swimmer.
