= Neil Chandler =

Australian rules footballer (1949–2022)

Personal information
- Full name: Neil Percival Chandler
- Born: 6 May 1949
- Died: 24 June 2022 (aged 73)
- Original team: Welshpool
- Debut: Round 14, 1968, Carlton vs. Essendon, at Windy Hill
- Height: 185 cm (6 ft 1 in)
- Weight: 83 kg (183 lb)

Playing career^{1}
Years	Club	Games (Goals)
1968–1974	Carlton	76 (22)
1974	St Kilda	6 (3)
Total		82 (25)
- ^{1} Playing statistics correct to the end of 1974.

Neil Chandler (6 May 1949 – 24 June 2022) was an Australian rules footballer who played for Carlton and St Kilda in the VFL.

Chandler played with Carlton during a successful era for the club and was a member of three premiership teams. He was a reserve in their 1968 and 1970 flags but earned a starting spot in 1972, playing on a half forward flank. Midway into the 1974 season he crossed to St Kilda before retiring at the end of the year.

Chandler was inducted into the Carlton Football Club Hall of Fame in 2024.
