= 1950 Brisbane Carnival =

Tournament information
- Sport: Australian football
- Location: Brisbane, Australia
- Format: Round Robin
- Teams: 9

Final champion
- SECTION A: Victoria; SECTION B: Australian Amateurs

The 1950 Brisbane Carnival was the 11th edition of the Australian National Football Carnival, an Australian football interstate competition. It was the first carnival to be hosted in Queensland and with the ANFC spending more than £15,000 as part of a major effort to promote the code in the state.

Rain was a constant throughout the carnival and as a result most games were held on a soggy Brisbane Exhibition Ground. Several of the matches were played at night using a white ball.

Section A consisted of the usual big three teams, Victoria, South Australia and Western Australia. The Tasmanian team joined them, having qualified through winning Section B of the 1947 Carnival and a team representing the VFA competed in the top section for the first time, as they were now full members of the Australian National Football Council. The VFA defeated South Australia by eight points in what was the biggest upset of the tournament. The VFA finished last in Section A, and as a result played Section B winners the Australian Amateurs in a play-off on 15 July 1951 to qualify for Section A at the next carnival in 1953.

Victoria finished the carnival unbeaten to claim the Championship.

The official total attendance was 52,000 with the highest crowds being 15,000 for the VFL vs Western Australia and 8,980 for the VFL vs South Australia match. However the ANFC's gate takings were well below expected, resulting in a massive £10,000 loss.

== Results ==
Section A

Winning team	Score	Losing team	Score
Tasmania	14.7 (91)	VFA	9.15 (69)
South Australia	11.17 (83)	Western Australia	9.7 (61)
South Australia	13.14 (92)	Tasmania	8.11 (49)
Victoria	18.10 (118)	Western Australia	10.5 (65)
VFA	6.6 (42)	South Australia	4.10 (34)
Victoria	16.11 (107)	Tasmania	8.7 (55)
Victoria	18.13 (121)	VFA	6.5 (41)
Western Australia	11.12 (78)	Tasmania	11.5 (71)
Victoria	10.8 (68)	South Australia	4.15 (39)
Western Australia	15.20 (110)	VFA	8.6 (54)

Section B

Winning team	Score	Losing team	Score
Queensland	13.15 (93)	Canberra	5.8 (38)
Australian Amateurs	11.13 (79)	New South Wales	8.6 (54)
Australian Amateurs	14.13 (97)	Queensland	11.7 (73)
New South Wales	21.13 (139)	Canberra	7.11 (53)
Australian Amateurs	15.21 (111)	Canberra	4.7 (31)
New South Wales	6.4 (40)	Queensland	4.6 (30)

== Tassie Medal ==
Ranking	Player	Votes	Team
1	Terry Cashion	8	Tasmania
2	Don Fraser	6	Victoria
3	Bob Hank	5	South Australia
4	Bill Hutchsion	4	Victoria
4	Les McClements	4	Western Australia

== Goal-kickers ==
Ranking	Player	Goals	Team
1	Bob Parsons	14	Tasmania
2	Bill Hutchsion	12	Victoria
3	Allan Ruthven	11	Victoria
4	Jim Conway	10	Western Australia
4	Les McClements	10	Western Australia
