= Alberton West =

- Town
- Coordinates: 38°36′00″S 146°35′26″E
- Country: Australia
- State: Victoria
- LGA: Shire of Wellington
- Location: 228 km (142 mi) SE of Melbourne; 64 km (40 mi) S of Traralgon; 6 km (3.7 mi) SW of Yarram

Government
  - State electorate: Gippsland South
  - Federal division: Gippsland

Population
  - Total: 76 (2021 census)
- Postcode: 3971
- County: Buln Buln

Alberton West is a locality in the Shire of Wellington, Victoria, Australia.

Alberton West Post Office opened on 15 October 1887 and closed in 1967.
