= Chris Aitken (Australian footballer) =

Australian rules footballer

Personal information
- Born: 26 October 1948 (age 78)
- Original team: Lower Plenty
- Height: 187 cm (6 ft 2 in)
- Weight: 82 kg (181 lb)

Playing career^{1}
Years	Club	Games (Goals)
1967–69, 1977	Melbourne	14 (15)
- ^{1} Playing statistics correct to the end of 1977.

Chris Aitken (born 26 October 1948) is a former Australian rules footballer who played with Melbourne in the Victorian Football League (VFL).

== Biography ==
His is the older brother of Melbourne musician and radio host, Wilbur Wilde. In the 2001 Australian federal election, he was the Australian Greens candidate in the Division of Gippsland, polling 5.55% of the vote.

He also played cricket, representing Victoria Country in two tour games. In 1978 he took four wickets in a match against an England XI at Leongatha and in 1980 played against touring New Zealanders.
