= Les Jones (Australian footballer, born 1922) =

Australian rules footballer

Les W. Jones

Personal information
- Full name: Leslie William Jones
- Born: 1 October 1922; Chelsea, Victoria
- Died: 22 May 1989 (aged 66)
- Original team: Chelsea Football Club
- Height: 183 cm (6 ft 0 in)
- Weight: 92 kg (203 lb)

Playing career^{1}
Years	Club	Games (Goals)
1944–1949	Richmond	59 (23)
- ^{1} Playing statistics correct to the end of 1949.

Leslie William "Les" Jones (1 October 1922 – 22 May 1989) was an Australian rules footballer who played with Richmond in the Victorian Football League (VFL).

Jones, a follower, made his league debut in round 18 of the 1944 VFL season. He played a preliminary final in his second VFL appearance and his third senior game was the 1944 Grand Final, which Richmond lost to Fitzroy. On Grand Final day he injured his leg and had to be replaced by the 19th man Keith Cook at half-time. His appearance was only made possible when he was granted leave from the Army. After leaving Richmond he captain-coached Yallourn.
