= Adrian Beer =

Australian rules footballer

Personal information
- Full name: Adrian Beer
- Born: 25 September 1943 (age 83)
- Original team: West Coburg
- Height: 188 cm (6 ft 2 in)
- Weight: 83 kg (183 lb)

Playing career^{1}
Years	Club	Games (Goals)
1961	North Melbourne	4 (0)
- ^{1} Playing statistics correct to the end of 1961.

Adrian Beer (born 25 September 1943) is a former Australian rules footballer who played for the North Melbourne Football Club in the Victorian Football League (VFL).
