= Laurie Rippon =

Australian rules footballer (born 1950)

Personal information
- Full name: Laurence Harry Rippon
- Born: 9 August 1950 (age 76)
- Original team: Welshpool
- Height: 193 cm (6 ft 4 in)
- Weight: 99 kg (218 lb)
- Position: Ruck

Playing career^{1}
Years	Club	Games (Goals)
1969–73	Footscray	45 (4)
1973–77	Prahran (VFA)	
- ^{1} Playing statistics correct to the end of 1973.

Laurie Rippon (born 9 August 1950) is a former Australian rules footballer who played with Footscray in the Victorian Football League (VFL).
