= Australian rules football in the Australian Capital Territory =

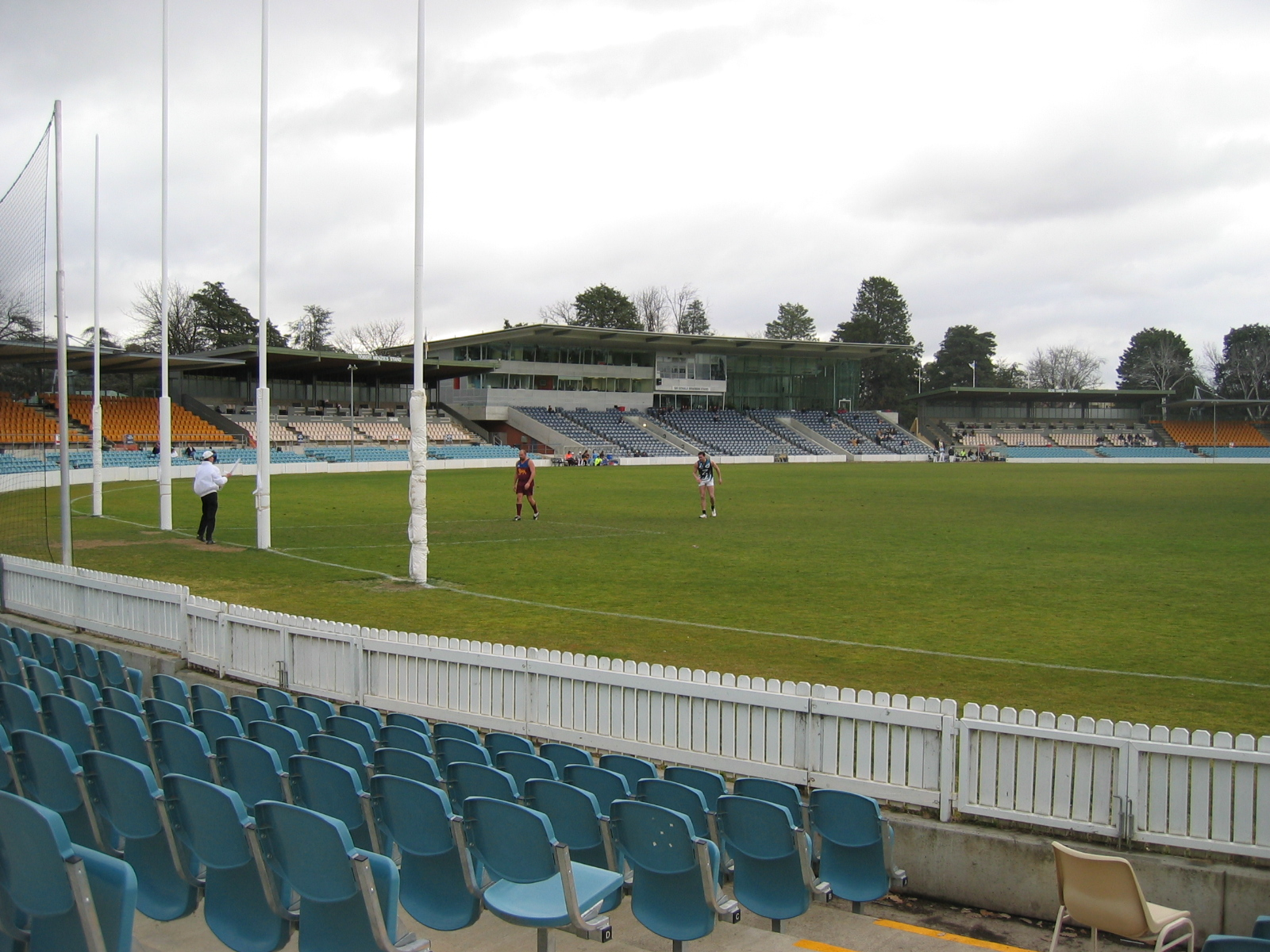
- Goal posts at Manuka Oval in 2006, home of Australian rules football in Canberra
- Governing body: AFL Canberra, AFL NSW/ACT
- Representative team: Australian Capital Territory
- First played: Canberra 29 July 1911; 115 years ago
- Registered players: 9,129 (adult); 2,953 (child)

Club competitions
- AFL Canberra; ACT Women's AFL

Audience records
- Single match: 14,974 (4 June 2016), AFL Greater Western Sydney Giants v Richmond Football Club (Manuka Oval, Canberra)

In the Australian Capital Territory (ACT), Australian rules football is a popular spectator and participation sport which has been played continuously since 1911. With 9,129 adult and 2,953 children playing the sport, it has the fourth highest team sport participation after soccer, basketball and netball. The current governing body is AFL Canberra founded 1922 which runs the competition by the same name, while the development body is AFL NSW/ACT established in 1999.

The ACT debuted at representative level in 1925 against New South Wales but has not appeared since 1988. Its first win came in 1941 against New South Wales; it also went on to defeat Queensland and the National Amateur team numerous times between the 1950s and 1980s culminating in defeats of the powerhouses of the VFL in 1980 and Tasmania in 1981. Kevin "Cowboy" Neale captained the side to many of these victories. The junior side was the third team to enter the Teal Cup in 1973.

Australian rules was the most popular football code for participation and spectators in the nation's capital Canberra between 1978 and 1982. At its peak popularity in 1981 it was the first state or territory outside of Victoria to make an official bid to start a national league now known as the Australian Football League (AFL). The Canberra bid in 1981 was rejected in favour of a team in Sydney, which became the Sydney Swans, selected for its larger population and potential audience. Canberra has made numerous failed bids since, including bids to move the Swans when they became insolvent. Rugby football seized the opportunity to firm its foothold however and the introduction of the Raiders (in 1982) and Brumbies (in 1996) saw rugby league and rugby union grow in popularity.

The ACT hosted its first AFL match in 1995 and AFL matches have been played every year since 2001 except 2020. Since 2012 the AFL has positioned Greater Western Sydney Giants (GWS) as a local side, scheduling three home games a year at Manuka Oval. In 2013, 2016, 2021 and 2022 the stadium's average attendance was higher than that of the Giants home, the Sydney Showgrounds, despite having 10,000 less available seats and a schedule of lower drawing opposition clubs. At least 6,400 GWS members were ACT-based at the end of 2022. The club in 2015 set a target to overtake the Raiders membership in 2018 with more than 10,000+ ACT-based members, however Raiders membership rapidly outpaced it growing its record to more than quadruple that of GWS.

Home grown hero Alex Jesaulenko and Australian Football Hall of Fame legend was a household name in the 1970s in Canberra. Jesaulenko has played more games and kicked more goals in the AFL than any other player from the ACT. James Hird is the only Canberran to win the prestigious Brownlow Medal. Both are multi premiership players. Britt Tully (games) and Jacqueline Parry (goals) share the honours in the AFLW. The ACT is classed as a development region by the AFL and in the AFL Draft, ACT is designated priority AFL recruitment zoning for the Greater Western Sydney Giants (and previously Sydney Swans), so most of the local players recruited from the ACT to the AFL (unless overlooked) generally start their careers at one of these two New South Wales based clubs.

== History ==
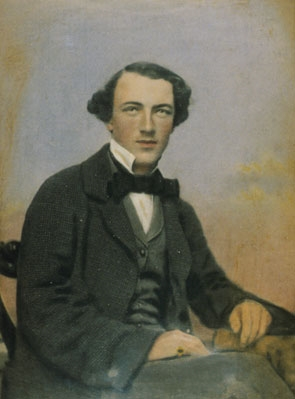
Australian football pioneer Tom Wills was born and raised on the Molonglo Plain, the future site of Canberra.

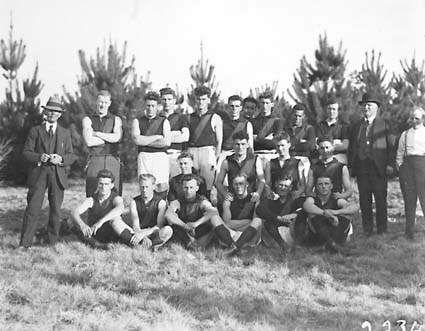
Federal Football team 1926 Federal Territory premiers

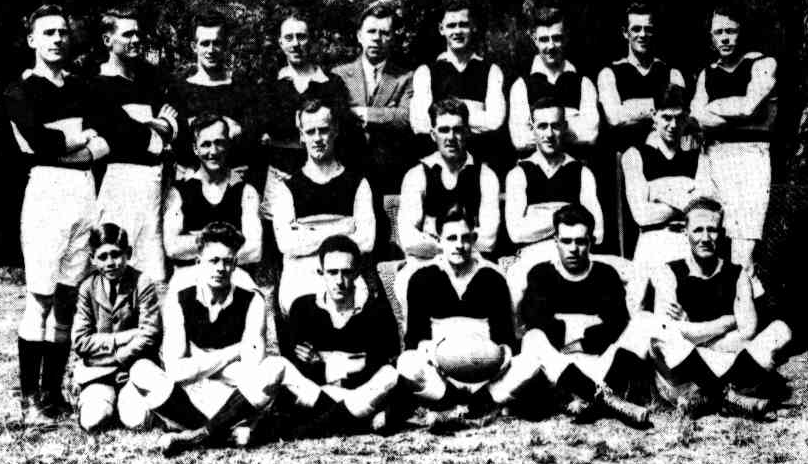
Acton Premiers of the ANF 1927

Prior to Australian Capital Territory (ACT) being established and Canberra being planned as the Federal capital, the region was part of the Colony of New South Wales and was known as the Molonglo Plain, or the Queanbeyan-Yass region, a sparsely populated mainly pastoral area. Tom Wills, founder of Australian rules was born on the Mongolo Plain near what is now the ACT from 1835-1839 prior to his family's move to Victoria.

In 1861, the Federal Football Club was established in nearby Wagga Wagga (which was originally proposed to be the Federal capital). However rugby arrived first from Sydney to the Molonglo in the 1870s with clubs formed in Queanbeyan in 1875 and Yass in 1878. No records exist of interclub matches for either sport, however, until at least 1880. Without sufficient player numbers to contest, the earliest contests were likely intraclub scratch matches. In 1874, the newly formed Southern Rugby Union (SRU), which governed football in the colony of New South Wales, placed a ban on clubs playing Australian rules as such, the clubs risked expulsion from the union if they competed against nearby Victorian rules sides. The local football clubs which sought to play against nearby Albury and Wagga due to a lack of nearby competition, were not able to. By the time that regular club competition was established in the nearby Riverina in 1884, rugby had become firmly established along with soccer which had arrived around the turn of the century.

Following the Federation of Australia in 1908, Canberra became the new planned national capital. Between 1901 and 1927, Melbourne had served as the National Capital. The gradual migration of civil servants from Melbourne to Canberra helped fuel strong early enthusiasm for the Australian rules.

The first recorded match of Australian rules in what was informally known as "Canberra" happened in 1911. It was an exhibition match between the Royal Military College and employees of the Home Affairs Department on the 29th July.

Three teams (Canberra, Duntroon and Federals) contested matches at the Acton Racecourse (now covered by Lake Burley Griffin) and at Blanfordia (now Manuka Oval).

The Federal Territory League Australian Rules Football League began in 1924 with founding members Acton and Queanbeyan. The following year, the premiership was contested by 4 clubs including Canberra, Federal and Duntroon. By 1926, the competition had gained popularity and was contested by five clubs.

New clubs gradually entered the league, when it became known as the Canberra Australian National Football League (CANFL) in 1927.

In 1931, the Canberra Australian National Junior League was formed.

=== World War II ===
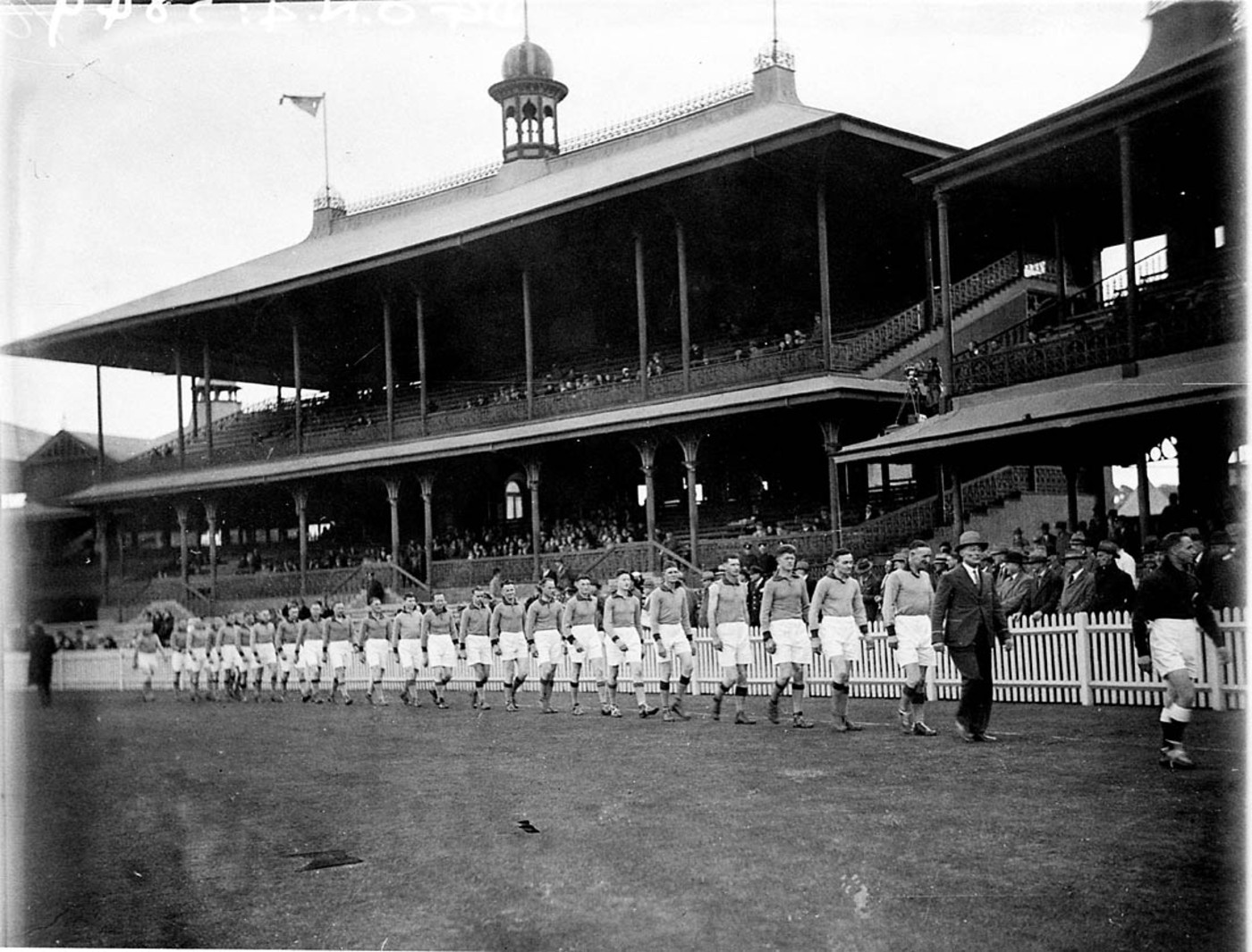
Canberra representative team making its national carnival debut parading the SCG at the 1933 Sydney Carnival.

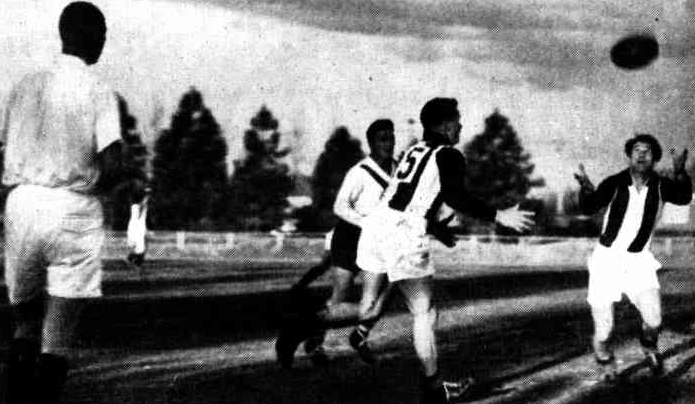
Football match featuring Ainslie in 1951

The ACTAFL lost 95% of its players during World War II.

=== 1970s Building on strong foundations ===
In 1974, the ACT hosted an Aboriginal Australian rules tournament, which included one of the earliest international matches. The Papua New Guinea national Australian rules football team visited to play an Indigenous Australian side in 1974 and played at Ainslie Oval defeating the Australian side.

Gate takings increased by 40% in 1975, and the CANFL changed to ACTAFL.

In 1977, the ACT was officially invited to join the NFL Night Series. The ACT competed in the 1978 and 1979 seasons. However the move created tensions with the VFL which had sought to establish its own rival national competition. The ACT, along with other states joined the Australian Football Championships Night Series in 1979, and competed also in 1980 and 1981.

=== 1980s & 1990s: AFL declines a licence, rugby popularity grows ===
In 1981, the ACTAFL, had just begun to edge out rugby league in popularity with an increase in participation. Under significant pressure from rugby league junior development in the territory and fearing the impact on its strong local competition of entry of a Sydney team, a formal bid for license to enter a Canberra team into the VFL was made with expected crowd projections of 15,000 per match and a significant television audience. However VFL dismissed the Canberra bid, stating that the VFL would consider Canberra for a license "within the next 10 years". The league was insistent that the license should go to Sydney and proceeded instead to push for South Melbourne's Swans to relocate there.

The following year, the NSW Rugby League entered the Canberra market with a new Canberra Raiders club. The Raiders were based at Queanbeyan in nearby New South Wales and weren't immediately successful with a wooden spoon in its first season and very small crowds, but the home team began to rapidly attract public support within two years began to outdraw the VFL's Canberra attendances.

In 1984, the ACTAFL applied to the National Football League to join the national competition which was under consideration at the time. That year the ACTAFL also began discussions with several VFL clubs about moving their home games so that Sydney could play the bulk of its away games in Canberra and Brisbane, but without success. With the VFL denying the Canberra bids entry and with the rising popularity of the Raiders, the ACT between 1983 and 1984 sought admission to the South Australian National Football League.

The VFL designated the ACT an exclusive recruitment zone for the Swans in 1986, which the ACTAFL was not pleased with. In 1986, the Canberra bid was again overlooked in favour of Perth and Brisbane.

In 1988 when the Sydney Swans folded and the licence was put out to tender, the AFLACT moved to buy the club and move it to Canberra; further calls were made to move the Swans to Canberra as they struggled through the early 1990s. The ACTAFL also sought to entice a struggling Melbourne club to relocate (which it claimed to be North Melbourne), without success.

In 1990, a sold out Ansett Cup (pre-season) match between Hawthorn and Sydney Swans at Bruce Stadium set an ACT attendance record of 11,500.

In 1991, the VFL cancelled a Fosters Cup match scheduled for Bruce Stadium shifting it to Albury. ACT interests cited falling attendance and interest in Canberra, however the VFL denied this.

A local lobby group, increasingly frustrated with the national league became very vocal in the 1990s. In 1993 an official "AFL For Canberra Bid" led by Ron Cahill and backed by the ACT government was launched.

The Fitzroy Football Club expressed interest to the AFL in playing home games in Canberra, and the first premiership match to be played in Canberra for Round 9, 1995 match between the Fitzroy and the West Coast Eagles. The match was played at the rectangular Bruce Stadium rather than Manuka Oval. Despite a frost, the match attracted a large amount of interest and a crowd of just under 12,000 attended and the Eagles defeated the struggling Lions by 28 points.

=== 2000s: AFL takes control ===
In 1998, the AFL (NSW/ACT) Commission took over operations of the ACTAFL. It scheduled North Melbourne Football Club's (the Kangaroos) first premiership match at Manuka Oval which attracted a crowd of 11,321. Canberra also began hosting the Barassi International Australian Football Youth Tournament.

"Australian rules football has a rich history in Canberra. We have neglected it over the past periods of time"

— AFL CEO Gillon McLachlan, 2015

In 2001, the AFL club the Kangaroos signed a deal with the ACT government to play some home matches at Manuka Oval. The move was seen by many as part of a potential relocation of the club to Canberra an idea which had its origins in the mid 1980s. The Kangaroos drew crowds averaging around 10,000 at Manuka Oval. However, in 2007 the club received a more lucrative offer, to play some home games at Carrara Stadium on the Gold Coast, Queensland, and signed a deal to that effect, which was met with significant disgust from Canberra. In August 2006, the AFL announced that the Melbourne Demons and Western Bulldogs would each play home games at Manuka, to fill the void left by the Kangaroos.

=== GWS adopts Canberra as a 'Second home' ===
"Canberra have their own [AFL] team, the GWS Giants. They play a number of games down here."

— AFL CEO Gillon McLachlan, 2015

Canberra continued to bid for its own AFL team. This was rejected in 2009 in favour of the Greater Western Sydney license. However, in 2012, the ACT government signed a contract with the GWS Giants to play four home games per season at Manuka Oval (three regular season, one preseason), having signed a 10-year deal worth $23 million. A Canberra logo (incorporating the Black Mountain Tower as a symbol) is incorporated on its guernsey, with a slightly altered Canberra-specific guernsey used for the games at Manuka. The Giants also played in a special guernsey as part of the centenary of Canberra celebrations, stating that the team is "part of the Canberra community". A GWS/ACT Academy has also been envisioned, and the territory has representation on the club's board.

The 2016 round 19 AFL match between GWS Giants and Richmond attracted a record crowd of 14,974, just overtaking the previous 2006 record for the match between the Kangaroos and Sydney.

The first AFLW premiership match played at Manuka, a Giants home game, with free entry attracted at territory record women's attendance of 6,460 however the league did not schedule any other matches and AFLW did not return to the ACT for another 4 years, and it did so with paid entry to significantly reduced crowds.

The round 21, 2019 match between Greater Western Sydney and Hawthorn was notable as it was the first professional Australian rules football match to be played in snowfall.

== Players ==
=== Participation ===
Registered adults
2016	2021/22	2023/24
7,504	8,274	9,129

=== Greats ===
Over the years, the ACT has produced many top players for elite professional leagues such as the Australian Football League, including Alex Jesaulenko, James Hird, Mick Conlan, Craig Bolton, Don Pyke, Shaun Smith, Adrian Barich, Brett Allison, and Aaron Hamill.

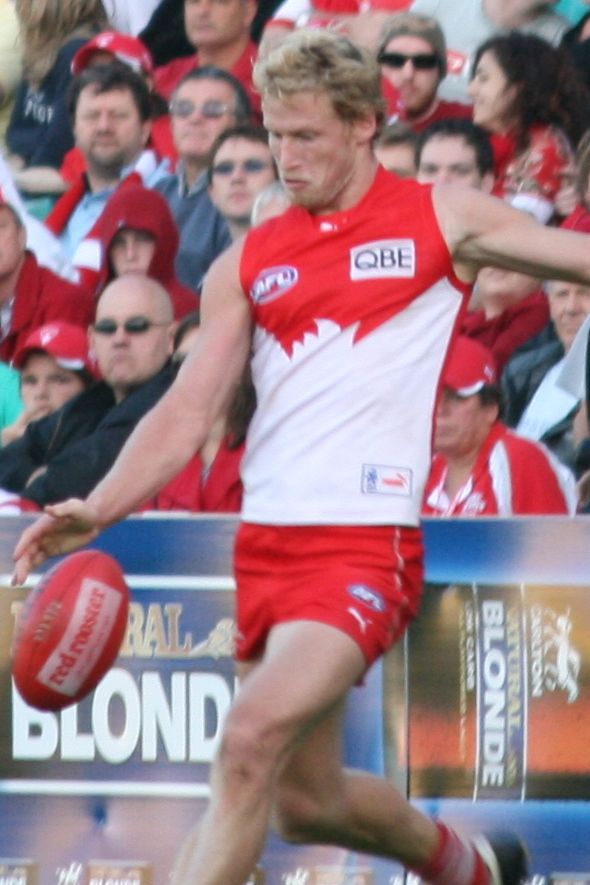
Craig Bolton playing for the Sydney Swans in 2009

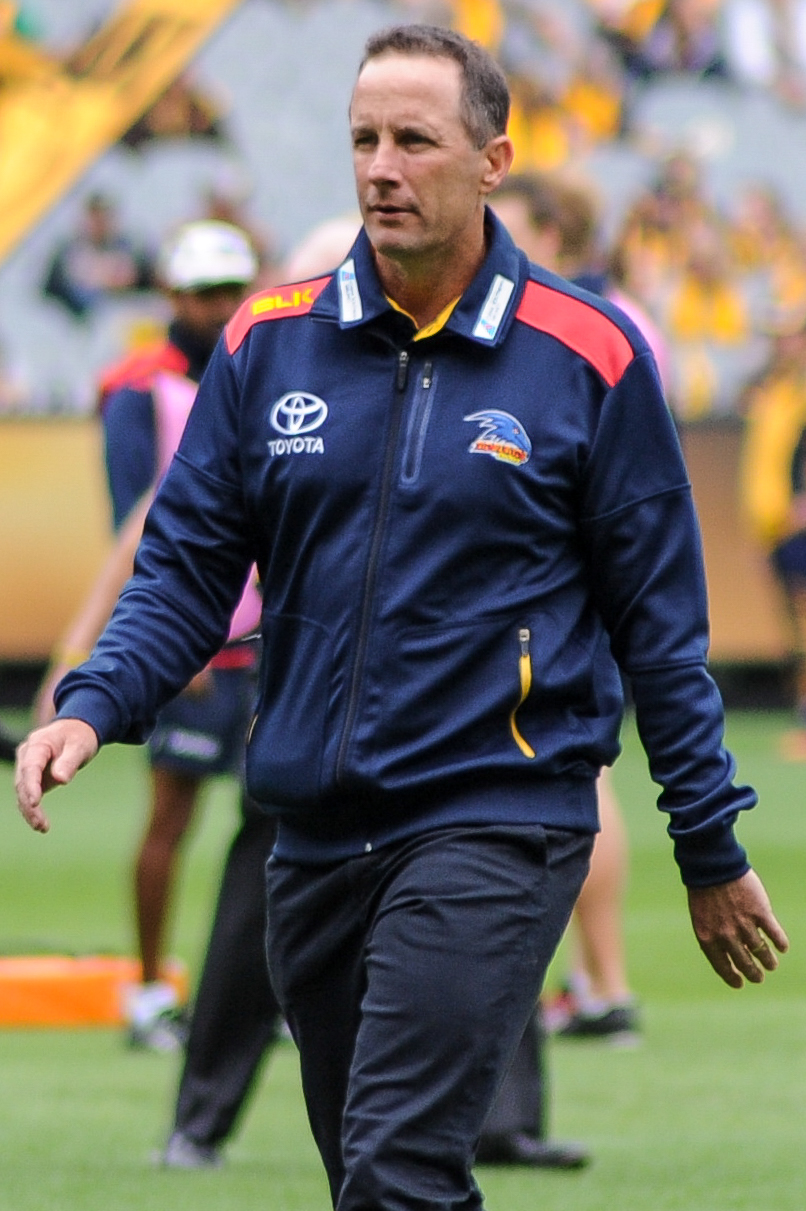
Don Pyke while coaching Adelaide

=== AFL Recruitment Zone ===
The ACT was made a Sydney Swans exclusive zone by the VFL in 1986; however, the Swans made poor use of the zone until the late 1990s, missing most of the top players. In 2012, the ACT zone was transferred to the AFL's GWS Giants. The Greater Western Sydney Giants Academy created a Canberra sub-academy, giving GWS has first pick of the most talented players from the ACT. The Giants have made much better use of the recruitment zone and as a result, most of the current players from the ACT now have begun their careers with the Giants.

== Governing body ==
The governing body is AFL NSW/ACT.

== Leagues ==
=== Open ===
- North East Australian Football League
- AFL Canberra

=== Masters ===
- AFL Canberra Masters Official site

=== Women's ===
- Australian Capital Territory Women's Australian Football League

== Representative Side ==
An Australian Capital Territory representative side played Interstate Football matches against other states and territories.

Australian Capital Territory's first National Football Carnival appearance was at the 1933 National Football Carnival. The side placed second in Division 2 of the 1958 National Football Carnival, and second in the 1968 Minor States National Football Carnival. In the 1990s, the Australian Capital Territory team was merged with the New South Wales team to form NSW/ACT; and from 1995, Australian Capital Territory was represented in interstate football as part of Allies, which also incorporated players from New South Wales, Queensland, Northern Territory and Tasmania.

=== Uniform ===
ACT	NSW/ACT

== Principal venues ==
There are several grounds around the ACT used by AFL Canberra, but only two with spectator facilities suitable for finals matches. In the 1990s, politician and former Canberra Raiders rugby league player Paul Osborne began a successful campaign to exclude the AFL from use of Canberra Stadium which ultimately resulted in its conversion into a rectangular field. As a result, Manuka Oval remains the only venue in the ACT that meets AFL Standard criteria and have been used to host AFL (National Standard) or AFLW level matches (Regional Standard).

Canberra	Canberra
Manuka Oval	Gungahlin Enclosed Oval
Capacity: 16,000	Capacity: 5,000
Manuka Oval	Gungahlin Enclosed Oval

== Audience ==
=== Attendance record ===
- 14,974 (Round 19, 2016), AFL Greater Western Sydney Giants v Richmond Football Club (Manuka Oval, Canberra)

== Books ==
1. de Moore, Greg; Hess, Rob; Nicholson, Matthew; Stewart, Bob (2021). Australia's Game: The History of Australian Football. Hardie Grant Books. ISBN 9781-74379-657-3.
