= James Orr (umpire) =

Australian cricket umpire (1868–1940)

James Patrick Orr (18 July 1868 at Brisbane, Queensland – 26 December 1940 at Brisbane, Queensland) was an Australian Test cricket umpire and senior Queensland public servant.

Orr umpired 23 first-class matches, all of them in Brisbane, between 1902 and 1932. He umpired one Test match in January 1931 between Australia and the West Indies at the Brisbane Exhibition Ground. Australia won by an innings with Don Bradman scoring 223, Bill Ponsford a century, and Clarrie Grimmett taking 9 wickets for the match. Orr's partner, Arthur Wyeth, was also standing in his only Test match.

Orr was on the staff of the Queensland Department of Agriculture and Stock from 1883 until his retirement in 1935. He joined the Stock Office as a youth, became secretary of the Board of Stock Commissioners, chief clerk and registrar of brands, and later chief clerk of the Department of Agriculture and Stock. In later years he was registrar of primary co-operative associations. He died at his home in the Brisbane suburb of Toowong in December 1940, aged 72.

== See also ==
- List of Test cricket umpires
