= Arthur Wyeth =

Australian cricket umpire (1887–1971)

Arthur Edwin Wyeth (3 July 1887 – 18 October 1971) was a cricket Test match umpire.

Wyeth umpired one Test match in 1931 between Australia and the West Indies at the Brisbane Exhibition Ground on 16 to 20 January 1931. Australia won by an innings with Don Bradman scoring 223, Bill Ponsford a century, and Clarrie Grimmett taking 9 wickets for the match. Wyeth's partner, James Orr, was also standing in his only Test match. Wyeth umpired eight first-class matches, all of them in Brisbane, between 1920 and 1931. The Test match was his last first-class match.

Wyeth married Nellie Bishop in Brisbane in November 1914. He worked as a draper's assistant.

== See also ==
- Australian Test Cricket Umpires
- List of test umpires
