= Brisbane Showgrounds =

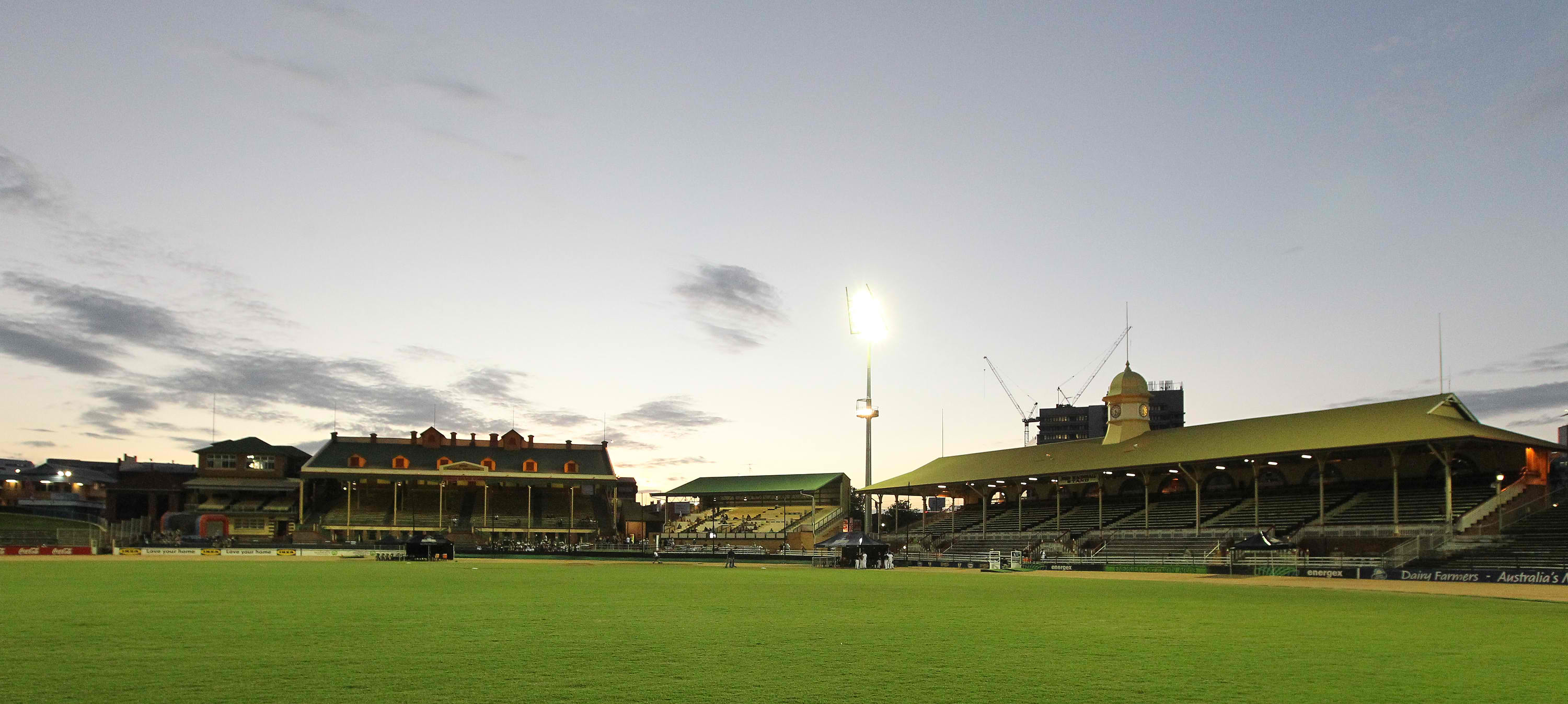
- Interactive map of Brisbane Showgrounds
- Former names: RNA Showgrounds; Ekka Grounds; Brisbane Exhibition Ground
- Location: Bowen Hills, Brisbane, Queensland, Australia
- Coordinates: 27°27′0″S 153°1′58″E
- Owner: The Royal National Agricultural and Industrial Association of Queensland
- Operator: The Royal National Agricultural and Industrial Association of Queensland
- Capacity: 25,490

Construction
- Groundbreaking: 1880
- Opened: 1886

Tenants
- Brisbane Bandits (ABL); Carlton Football Club (VFL) (1930); Geelong Football Club (VFL) (1952)

Ground information

International information
- First men's Test: 30 November – 5 December 1928: Australia v England
- Last men's Test: 16–20 January 1931: Australia v West Indies
- Only women's Test: 28–31 December 1934: Australia v England
- As of 26 April 2017; Source: ESPNcricinfo

Brisbane Showgrounds
- Location within Queensland
- 27.4508°S 153.032°E
- Location: 600 Gregory Terrace, Bowen Hills, City of Brisbane, Queensland, Australia

History
- Design period: 1870s–1890s (late 19th century)
- Built: 1880s–1980s

Site notes
- Architect: Claude William Chambers

Queensland Heritage Register
- Official name: Brisbane Exhibition Grounds, RNA Showgrounds, National Agricultural and Industrial Association of Queensland Exhibition Grounds, Royal National Agricultural and Industrial Association of Queensland Exhibition Grounds/Show Grounds, Royal Queensland Showgrounds
- Type: state heritage (landscape, built)
- Designated: 25 July 2003
- Reference no.: 601709
- Significant period: 1880s–1980s (fabric); 1876+ (social); 1881, 1887, c. 1903, 1914–19, 1927–28, 1939–44, 1971, 1989
- Significant components: toilet block/earth closet/water closet, dormitory, gate – entrance, park / green space, studio – broadcasting, yards – livestock, show ring, workshop, embankment – railway, pavilion – exhibition, turnstile/s, trees/plantings, auditorium, stables, grandstand, hall, tunnel – pedestrian, bank, bar, memorial – plaque, fence/wall – perimeter, bridge/viaduct – railway, office/s
- Builders: Walls & Juster

The Brisbane Showgrounds (formerly known as the Brisbane Exhibition Ground) is a multi-purpose venue located in Bowen Hills, Brisbane, Australia. Established in 1875, it hosts more than 250 events each year, the largest being the Royal Queensland Show (Ekka).

The Brisbane Showgrounds was designed by Claude William Chambers and built by Walls & Juster. It is also referred to as the RNA Showgrounds, Ekka Grounds, Royal National Agricultural and Industrial Association of Queensland, Exhibition Grounds/Show Grounds, and Royal Queensland Showgrounds. It was added to the Queensland Heritage Register on 25 July 2003.

The Brisbane Showgrounds is owned and operated by The Royal National Agricultural and Industrial Association of Queensland. Over 9 days in August, it hosts the Ekka show. Throughout the rest of the year, other events can hire spaces in the Brisbane Showgrounds.

== History ==
The site of the Brisbane Showgrounds, together with the nearby Victoria Park, was originally utilised by the Indigenous Turrbal or Duke of York clan as a camp ground. They called this area Barrambin. During the early colonial period, the British named it York's Hollow. During the 1840s, up to 400 Turrbal people would reside around the waterholes at York's Hollow. In 1846, police constables dispersed this major campsite killing at least 3 people, while in 1849 British soldiers of the 11th Regiment conducted another dispersal wounding several. Also in 1849, York's Hollow started to be used as a campsite for the influx of newly arrived European immigrants under John Dunmore Lang's immigration scheme. It was also utilised as a site for brick manufacture and by 1860 it appears that Aboriginal people were no longer able to reside in the area.

In July 1863, the site became part of the Queensland Acclimatisation Society's grounds. This Society, established in 1862 to promote the introduction, acclimatisation, propagation and distribution in Queensland of economically useful plants and animals, was granted 33 acres (13 ha) of land bounded by Bowen Bridge Road, O'Connell Terrace, Brookes Street and Gregory Terrace. At the north-western corner of the site, fronting Bowen Bridge Road and O'Connell Terrace, the Society established a public exhibition garden Bowen Park. The remainder of the site was used for experimentation purposes, growing and propagating plants and seeds sent from other parts of Queensland, other colonies and around the world, and raising various introduced animals. The Society played an important role in the beginnings of commercial agriculture in Queensland, introducing or trialling crops and plants such as mango trees, ginger plants, sugar cane, olive trees and choko vines.

The history of the Ekka on the site of the Brisbane Showgrounds dates back to August 1876, with the staging of the Queensland Intercolonial Exhibition. None of the buildings from 1876 have survived, but the grounds have increased from an original 12 acres (4.9 ha) to 22 hectares (54 acres) and contain a variety of structures and facilities associated with the annual August Ekka. The site has been the venue for Queensland's principal agricultural exhibition for 139 years. It remains the home of the annual Royal Queensland Show and is Queensland's premier showground. Since 1876, four annual Royal Queensland Shows on this site have been cancelled: the 1919 Exhibition due to the influenza epidemic, in 1942 during World War II when the grounds were occupied by military personnel and the 2020 and 2021 shows due to the COVID-19 pandemic.

Queensland's 1876 Intercolonial Exhibition was not the first competitive demonstration of agricultural and industrial progress in the colony. In 1854, squatters from the Darling Downs and Moreton Bay districts of New South Wales established the Northern Districts' Agricultural and Pastoral Association, modelled on the Scottish Highland Agricultural Societies. They planned to hold exhibitions (mainly of pastoral produce) at Brisbane, Ipswich, Warwick, Drayton and Gayndah, in rotation, and some shows were held before the Association became immersed in more political activities. Nurseryman Albert John Hockings was instrumental in holding horticultural shows in Brisbane from 1855. In the 1860s other regional agricultural and pastoral associations were formed, among the earliest being the Darling Downs Agricultural Society (based at Toowoomba) in 1860, the Drayton and Toowoomba Agricultural and Horticultural Society in 1864, the East Moreton Farmers Association (based at Ipswich) in 1866 and the Eastern Downs Horticultural and Agricultural Association (based at Warwick) in 1867. These Associations conducted annual exhibitions of agricultural, horticultural, and pastoral produce and farm machinery. Prizes were awarded for best exhibits. The object was to encourage the exchange of knowledge and to foster better farm practice. Associations such as these proliferated in Queensland during the second half of the 19th century and each held an annual "show".

In 1874 moves were initiated by Queensland's Chief Inspector of Stock, Patrick Robertson Gordon, to form a national agricultural society, to plan Brisbane's first intercolonial exhibition. He was supported by Gresley Lukin, editor of the Brisbane Courier and the Queenslander, and agricultural agent John Fenwick. In May 1875 an inaugural meeting, presided over by the Queensland Governor, Sir William Wellington Cairns, was held to form the National Agricultural and Industrial Association of Queensland. A constitution drafted by the headmaster of the Brisbane Grammar School, Thomas Harlin, was adopted in July, and the first meeting of the National Agricultural and Industrial Association of Queensland was held at the Brisbane Town Hall on 13 August 1875. Arthur Hunter Palmer, later Premier of Queensland, was elected to the chair and other founding members included Joshua Peter Bell, George Harris, George Gromes, Thomas Harlin, Charles Stewart Mein and William Hemmant. At this meeting, the use of part of the Queensland Acclimatisation Society's grounds was discussed and subsequently, a lease of approximately 12 acres (4.9 ha) from the Society was arranged.

The alliance with the Acclimatisation Society was considered to be a sensible arrangement. There were common interests, the site was well supplied with water and convenient to the city and it was thought at the time that many women and townspeople, who might have hesitated in visiting a purely utilitarian exhibition of produce, animals and farm machinery, may have been induced by the additional attraction of the Acclimatisation Society Gardens.

The Intercolonial Exhibition was intended to promote and showcase the agricultural, pastoral and industrial resources of the whole of Queensland. Whether it could be sustained beyond a single exhibition remained to be seen. The National Association did not wish to supplant regional agricultural societies and associations, but wished to encourage their organisation, and foster a spirit of friendly rivalry amongst them by holding a grand central exhibition for the competition of winners at minor shows. To avoid clashing with local shows and in order to hold the exhibition during fine weather, before the shearing season, and when good feed would be found along the roads, it was decided to stage the Exhibition in August 1876.

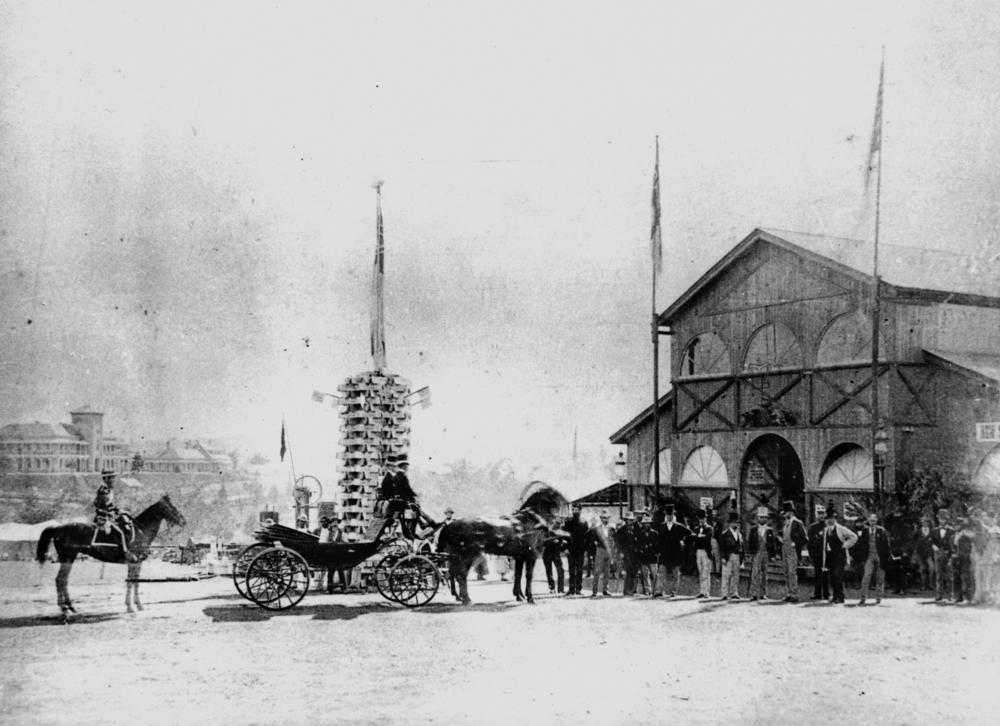
Governor's party arriving at the Queensland Intercolonial Exhibition, 1876

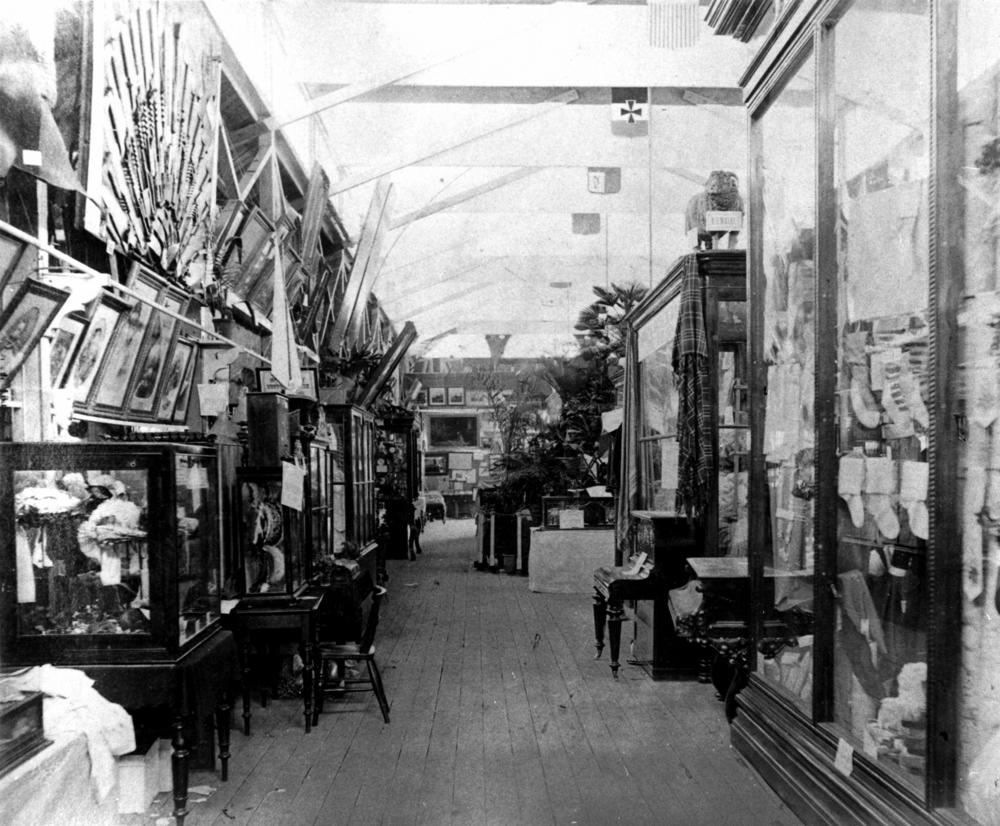
Fine Arts on display at the first Queensland Intercolonial Exhibition, 1876

The first exhibition building was a large timber hall with side aisles and a central clerestory. It was erected in 1876 along Gregory Terrace near the corner of Bowen Bridge Road, at a cost of £1254, and was a modification of a design prepared by Queensland Colonial Architect, Francis Stanley. Sydney exhibitor Jules Joubert added a rectangular wing to the northern side to increase the extent of his exhibition. Cattle, sheep and horse stalls of hardwood framing with corrugated iron roofing were erected in the grounds and a small showring was established north of the Exhibition Building.

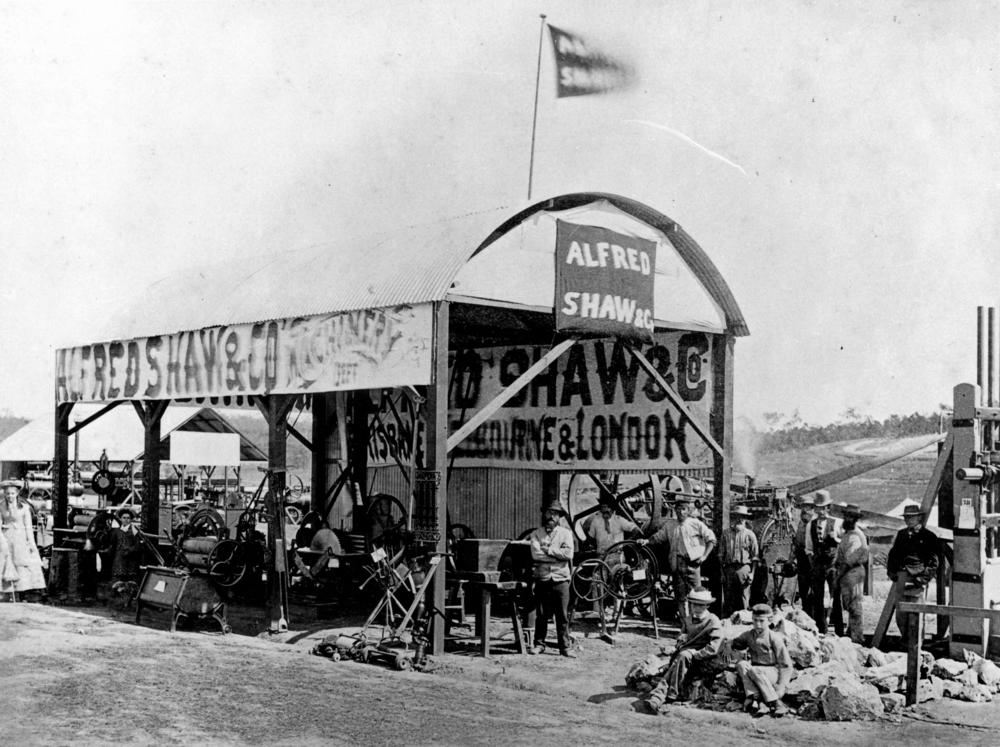
Alfred Shaw and Co.'s machinery exhibition at the Queensland Intercolonial Exhibition, 1876

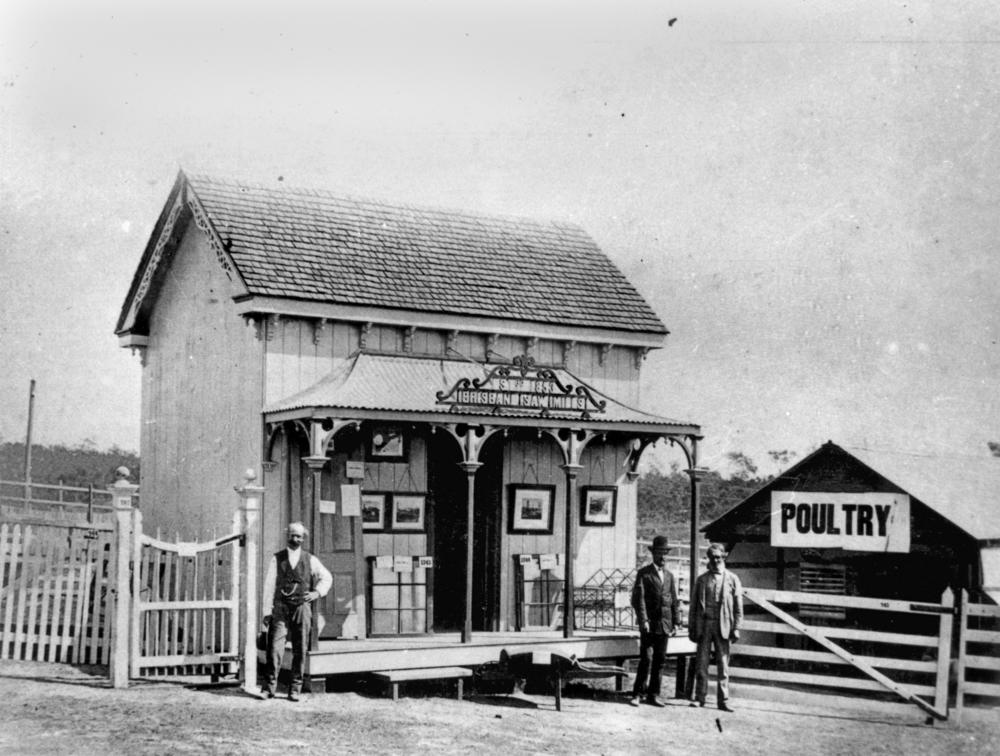
Model house displayed by a sawmilling business at the Queensland Intercolonial Exhibition, 1876

The first Queensland Intercolonial Exhibition was declared open by Governor Cairns on Tuesday 22 August 1876 and ran until 28 August. It proved immensely popular, with a total of £1045 taken at the gate. Thereafter, the Exhibition became an annual event.

In the period 1876–1888, the National Agricultural and Industrial Association of Queensland expended an estimated £7000 on the grounds. The main exhibition building was doubled in size for the 1877 exhibition and another annexe was provided for horticultural exhibits.

In 1879, the National Association was awarded a lease of 23 acres (9.3 ha) of the 32-acre (13 ha) Acclimatisation Society grounds for a period of 50 years, for use as an exhibition ground. In 1881 the railway to Sandgate was constructed through the National Association and Acclimatisation Society grounds creating the Exhibition railway station. The line was later re-routed via Central, Brunswick Street and Bowen Hills, but the Exhibition railway line still opens each year during the August show. By 1882, the Exhibition Grounds comprised all the land south, southeast and east of the railway line and bounded by Bowen Bridge Road, Gregory Terrace, Brookes Street and O'Connell Terrace. A 1000-seat capacity grandstand, designed by Francis Stanley, was erected in 1885 (not the first grandstand on the site). In 1887 a timber residence designed by George Addison was constructed at the corner of O'Connell Terrace and Brookes Street for the Secretary of the National Association.

In 1887, the first exhibition building was destroyed by fire. The public called for it to be replaced with a masonry building, but the National Association was reluctant to commit to the necessary expenditure without more secure land tenure, against which they could borrow money for permanent exhibition buildings. In 1888 a temporary timber exhibition building was constructed for approximately £500, while the National Association called for competitive designs for a permanent exhibition building. Under the provisions of the National Association and Acclimatisation Society Act 1890, the land leased from the Queensland Acclimatisation Society for an exhibition ground was resumed and granted to the National Association as Trustees, who were also empowered under this act to borrow money from the Queensland Government to erect the new exhibition building.

The design competition was won by George Addison, the Brisbane partner of the Melbourne based firm Oakden, Addison & Kemp. In 1890 Addison amended his original design to a T-shape, incorporating a southern wing with a concert hall which could be rented out to offset repayments on the government loan. The new building was erected closer to the corner of Bowen Bridge Road and Gregory Terrace than the original building. The foundation stone was laid on 25 April 1891 and the builder, John Quinn, was required to have a section of the building completed for the August 1891 exhibition, with the whole of the building to be completed within 12 months.

A plan of the Exhibition Grounds published in The Queenslander on 15 August 1891 shows the new exhibition building, several smaller pavilions, a show ring in the position of the present main show ring, the 1885 grandstand (where the Ernest Baynes Stand is now located), animal shelters along the boundaries and the secretary's residence near Brookes Street.

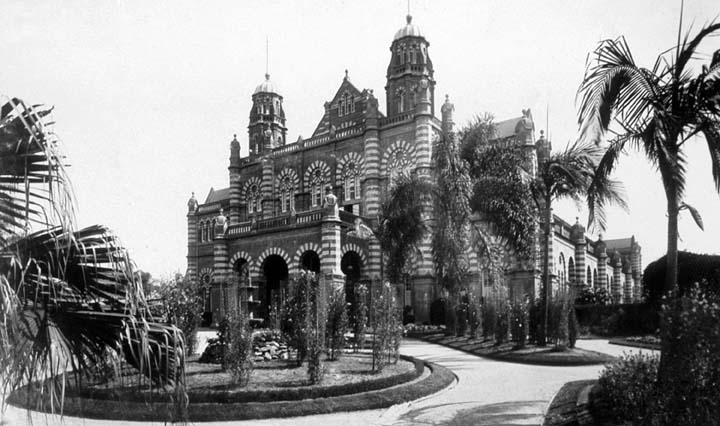
Old Museum Building,1926

The new exhibition building was completed in 1892 and a public holiday was declared for 10 August 1982 to mark the official opening of the Exhibition. Despite the economic depression, 32,000 people attended on the holiday and more than 66,000 over the four-day course of the Exhibition. However, the National Association did not escape the effects of the 1890s depression, struggling to repay the government loan on the exhibition building. In 1897 the Queensland Government resumed the building and liquidated the Association's debts. The Exhibition Concert Hall continued to serve as a concert venue but the remainder of the Exhibition Building was refurbished for the Queensland Museum, which moved to the building from William Street in 1899 (now known as the Old Museum Building). At this time the museum grounds were resumed from the National Association's land as a separate reserve. The National Association struggled to maintain the viability of the remaining Exhibition Grounds until 1902–03, when the Queensland Government took control of the Association's assets, leasing the Exhibition Grounds back to the Association at an annual rental.

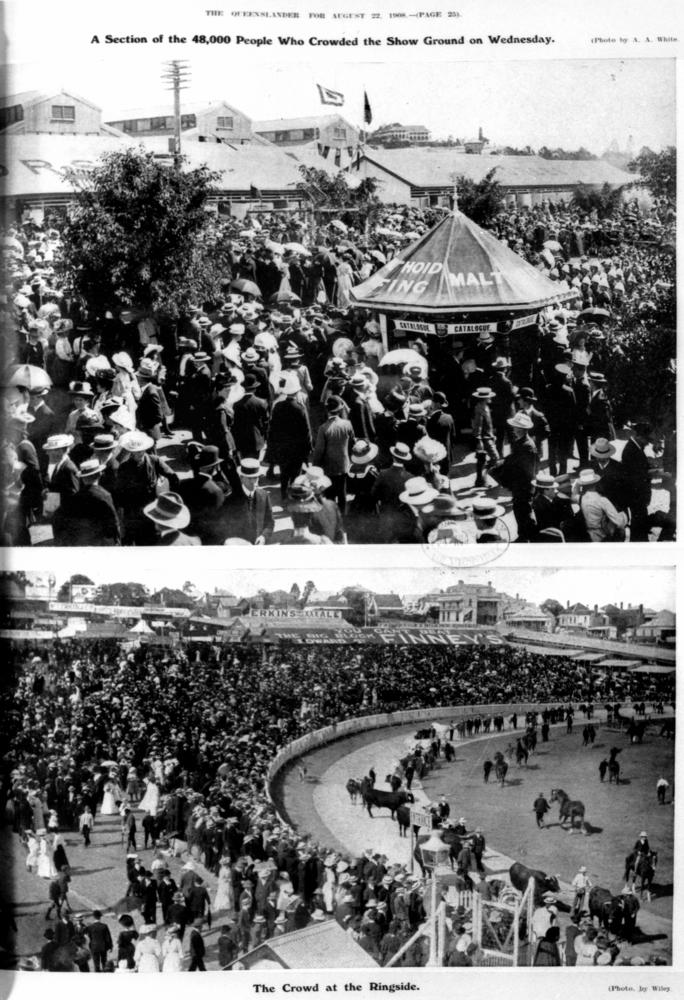
48,000 people crowding the show ground, August 1908

In the early 1900s, the Queensland economy revived and the National Association's financial position firmed. Substantial improvements and re-arrangements of the Exhibition Grounds were made in 1906 in time for the August show. A fine new grandstand, designed by Brisbane architect Claude William Chambers, was erected at a cost of £6248. (In 1923, this stand was renamed the John MacDonald Stand in honour of a long-serving National Association councillor). The sideshow booths which had been located on the hill to the north of the main ring, were moved to the valley on the northwest side of the railway, their place being taken by machinery exhibits. The hill has since been known as Machinery Hill and the valley as Sideshow Alley.

In 1909, the year of the Jubilee Exhibition (celebrating 50 years since the separation of Queensland from New South Wales), the Exhibition Grounds were extended with the acquisition of Petty's Paddock, an adjacent 6 acres (2.4 ha) bounded by Gregory Terrace and Alexandria, Science and Water Streets, purchased for £4500. Around 1910, a two-storey timber building with pressed metal ceilings and a prominent roof fleche, was erected along the northern side of Gregory Terrace near the main entrance. A section of this building was utilised as a Post Office by August 1933.

During the World War I, a military recruiting and training camp, complete with a rifle range, was established at the Exhibition Grounds, but this did not prevent the annual Exhibition from proceeding.

In the 1910s, Brisbane architects Richard Gailey snr and Richard Gailey jnr established a relationship with the National Association which was to last through the 1920s and 1930s. In May 1914, they called tenders for the construction of a sheep, pig and poultry pavilion and fencing along Gregory Terrace and in 1917 for timber dog and horse pavilions.

In 1917, Toowoomba's Austral Hall (designed by architect William Hodgen and erected in 1904) was purchased for £1500 and re-erected at the Brisbane Exhibition Grounds. It was the largest building of its type in Queensland. Reflecting the growing popularity of the motor car, the pavilion was occupied by representatives of the local automobile trade. It was the first Brisbane Exhibition pavilion to be dedicated solely to motor vehicle displays, automobile exhibits previously being located on Machinery Hill. In 1919 Austral Hall was renamed the John Reid Pavilion following the death that year of Brisbane merchant John Reid, a long-time supporter of the National Association.

Affleck House was completed by August 1918 for the showtime use of Stock Breeders' Association delegates. It was named after National Association councillor WL Affleck, who raised the finance for the construction.

During the influenza epidemic which swept Australia in 1919, following the return of service personnel from overseas at the end of the World War I, army huts were erected at the exhibition grounds as isolation wards for the nearby Brisbane General Hospital, and dining rooms were set up to feed and house the expected influx of seriously ill patients. Due to the threat of crowd contagion and to prevent disturbing patients in the isolation wards, the Exhibition was cancelled that year.

In 1920, the Prince of Wales (later Edward VIII) visited the Exhibition, following which the Association moved to incorporate the word "Royal" into its name as the Royal National Agricultural and Industrial Association of Queensland, which over the years has been reduced, unofficially, to the Royal National Association (RNA). In recent years the RNA has registered as its trademark the word "Ekka" (a long-standing colloquial shortening of the word 'Exhibition').

During the interwar years many improvements were made to the exhibition grounds, with various buildings erected or extended during this period. A timber show hall was erected c. 1921 between Gregory Terrace and Water Street and a brick exhibition building, designed by architects Atkinson & Conrad, was constructed in 1923 for Lever Brothers.

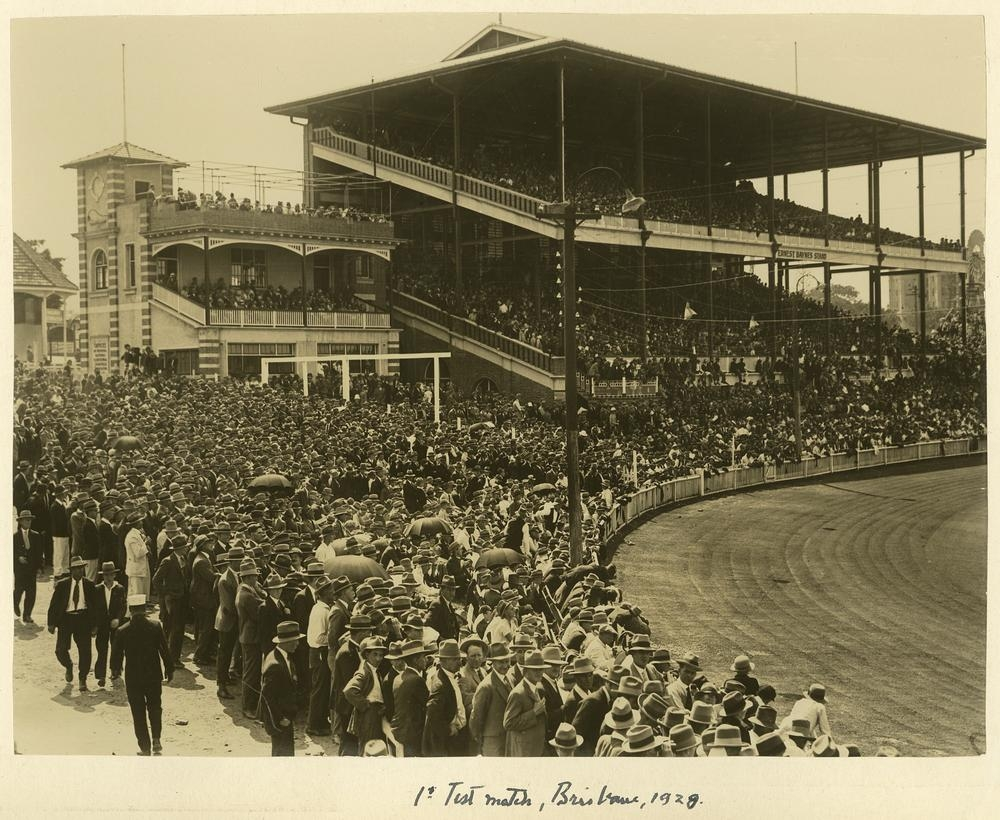
Ernest Baynes Stand, 1928

In 1922–23, the Ernest Baynes Stand was erected on the site of the 1885 grandstand. Designed by architect Richard Gailey jnr and constructed by John Hutchinson, the building had two tiers with a seating capacity of 5000 and a total capacity of 7000. It was constructed with a steel frame faced with brick, the larger steel sections being imported from Britain and the smaller sections made in Australia. The foundation stone of the new grandstand was laid by Queensland Governor, Sir Matthew Nathan, in November 1922 and the stand was completed in time for the August 1923 Exhibition, at a cost of £26,884. The sub-floor contained a dining room which could accommodate 600 persons at a sitting and a row of ten shops facing the lane at the rear of the structure.

A second show ring, intended principally for exhibiting dairy cattle, was established to the north of the Exhibition railway line which transects the Exhibition Grounds and was ready for the show of 1924. Its construction reflected the growing importance of the dairy industry to Queensland where, with Government encouragement, it became Queensland's second largest primary industry and sustained rural Queensland during the depression of the 1930s.

By 1925, the RNA Council Stand, located adjacent the Ernest Baynes Stand overlooking the show ring, had been constructed. The Stand was originally two storeys. At some early period the northern end of the building was extended to incorporate an entrance to the seating in front of the stand. By 1938, a third storey had been added to the building and later a two-storey extension facing Executive Street was constructed.

In 1927, legislation was enacted to grant the National Association perpetual lease of the grounds, at that time comprising just under 20 acres (8.1 ha). There followed a burst of ground improvements, mostly designed by architect Richard Gailey Jnr, including a dog pavilion, meat exhibition pavilion, more turnstiles and a new lavatory block in 1927; new horse and cattle stalls; and turnstiles at the corner of Costin Street and Gregory Terrace, in 1928. Also erected in 1928 were show pavilions for General Motors, Brisbane Cars & Tractors, the Vacuum Oil Company. (concrete structure) and Kodak, and a demonstration fibrous cement cottage designed by architect Eric Percival Trewern for James Hardie.

At this period the RNA sought to make the grounds a first-class venue for cricket, football and other sports, but had limited success in attracting the big matches. The year 1928 was a high point for the Association's sporting ambitions, with the showground the venue for the first England versus Australia cricket test in Queensland and the first in the 1928–29 series. Legendary Australian cricketer Donald Bradman made his Test debut at the Brisbane Exhibition Grounds in 1928. More successful than cricket or football was Exhibition Speedway, established in 1926.

A new Lady Forster Creche was opened in Costin Street, near the main entrance to the Exhibition Grounds, in time for the 1928 show. (Previously the creche was located on the main showgrounds north of Gregory Terrace.) The centre was operated by the Creche and Kindergarten Association and provided baby care while parents were enjoying the rounds of the show. In 1939, the Creche was removed to a new location near the Anglican dining hall, north of Gregory Terrace.

In 1929, the Commonwealth Bank, which since 1923 had been conducting a bank at the Exhibition Grounds during the annual show, constructed a purpose-designed bank building in the grounds, just to the south of the Council Stand. Although it was not uncommon for banks to establish agencies at showgrounds around Australia, this building is believed to be the only "exhibition" bank building specifically constructed for the Commonwealth Bank. The northeast end of the building was extended in 1947.

Despite the severe economic depression of the early 1930s, the Exhibition continued to attract its strong annual August attendance. More land was acquired, including a further 2 acres (0.81 ha) 23 perches (580 m^{2}) excised from Bowen Park in 1932, bringing the total Exhibition Grounds to about 40 acres (16 ha). Improvements to the grounds at this period included more cattle stalls along O'Connell Terrace (architect Richard Gailey Jnr) and a new show pavilion for Foggitt Jones Pty Ltd (architects Addison & MacDonald) in 1932; and a new dairy produce hall (architect Richard Gailey jnr) for the RNA in 1933.

As the economy recovered during the second half of the 1930s, a number of substantial improvements were made to the RNA's exhibition facilities. In 1936, Gailey called tenders for a Wool Hall, additions to the pig and horse pavilions, new Stock & Station Agents' offices and dining hall and a new yearling sale ring. New concrete roads and additional seating accommodation were provided. The old Industrial Pavilion was demolished in 1938 and its replacement, designed by Richard Gailey Jnr and covering an area of 3.5 acres (1.4 ha), was completed along Gregory Terrace in June 1939 at a cost of £40,000. A new electricity hall at the corner of Gregory Terrace and Costin Street was also completed for the 1939 show – reputedly the first show pavilion in Australia dedicated entirely to electricity exhibits. (The Hall of Science, as it was later known, was demolished in 1986 to make way for a new Exhibition Building).

During World War II, the Exhibition Grounds were occupied from late 1939 to 1944 by military authorities as a venue for training, accommodation and embarkation of troops. (Showgrounds and racecourses with their ovals and existing toilet facilities were favoured places to temporarily accommodate service personnel.) Troops at the exhibition grounds slept in pig and cattle pens; the bars beneath the John MacDonald Stand became wet canteens; and troop trains departed from the railway platforms normally used by show patrons. In 1940 and again in 1941, the military vacated the grounds temporarily for the August Exhibition. Following the entry of Japan into the war in December 1941, American troops were stationed at the showgrounds and the Exhibition of 1942 was cancelled, but was renewed in a limited fashion in 1943 and 1944. Following the war, the RNA purchased a number of buildings from the military, for use on the site.

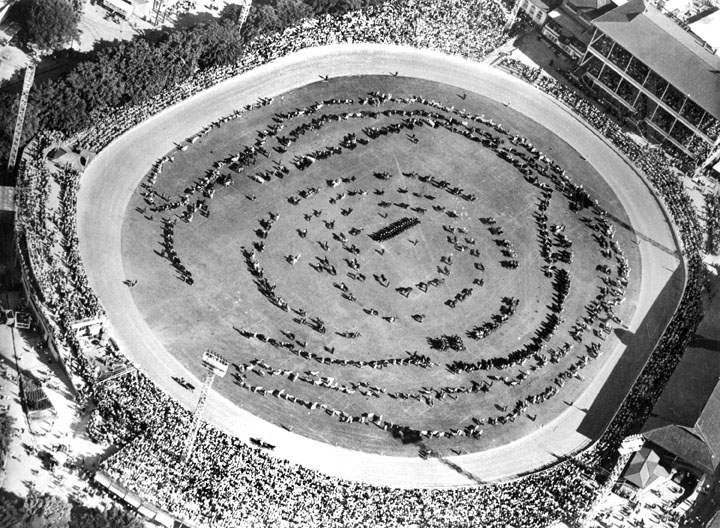
Aerial view of the grand parade of livestock, main show ring, circa 1950s

The 1950s saw further improvements and works to the grounds with the construction of a Beef Cattle Pavilion in 1950, the work being carried out by MR Hornibrook Builders at a cost of £206,000, and the addition of seating around the main oval near Machinery Hill. Also constructed in the 1950s was a new Dairy Industry Hall, adjacent to the John Reid Pavilion, on the site of the 1933 dairy hall. By the late 1950s, the grounds comprised approximately 50 acres (20 ha).

The Brisbane Exhibition Ground was also the site chosen for the people of Brisbane to welcome Queen Elizabeth II and her husband, Prince Philip, the Duke of Edinburgh, when they visited Australia during March 1954. It was Queen Elizabeth's first visit to Australia as Queen of Australia and 30,000 people attended the 40-minute welcome ceremony at the Exhibition Ground.

A number of new buildings were erected in the 1960s. In 1962, the RNA moved its offices from the Queensland Primary Producers Association building in Adelaide Street to the Exhibition Grounds and in 1970 a purpose-built RNA Administration Building costing $111,584 was opened. In 1963, on land acquired along Constance Street, a double pavilion known as the Agricultural Hall and Douglas Wadley Pavilion was constructed. The Agricultural Hall housed district and junior farmer exhibits. The Douglas Wadley Pavilion, extended in 1968 and again in 1977, housed dogs, and is used regularly for exhibitions in addition to the annual August show. In 1968 the Ring Control and Broadcast building was enlarged. By 1970, the grounds comprised approximately 55 acres (22 ha).

The first animal nursery was established by RNA councillor Frank Robertson at the 1964 show. The baby animals have proved one of the most popular and enduring of the show traditions and has been copied by show societies throughout Australia. At the 1972 Exhibition a purpose-built facility for the animal nursery was opened, named in honour of Mr Robertson.

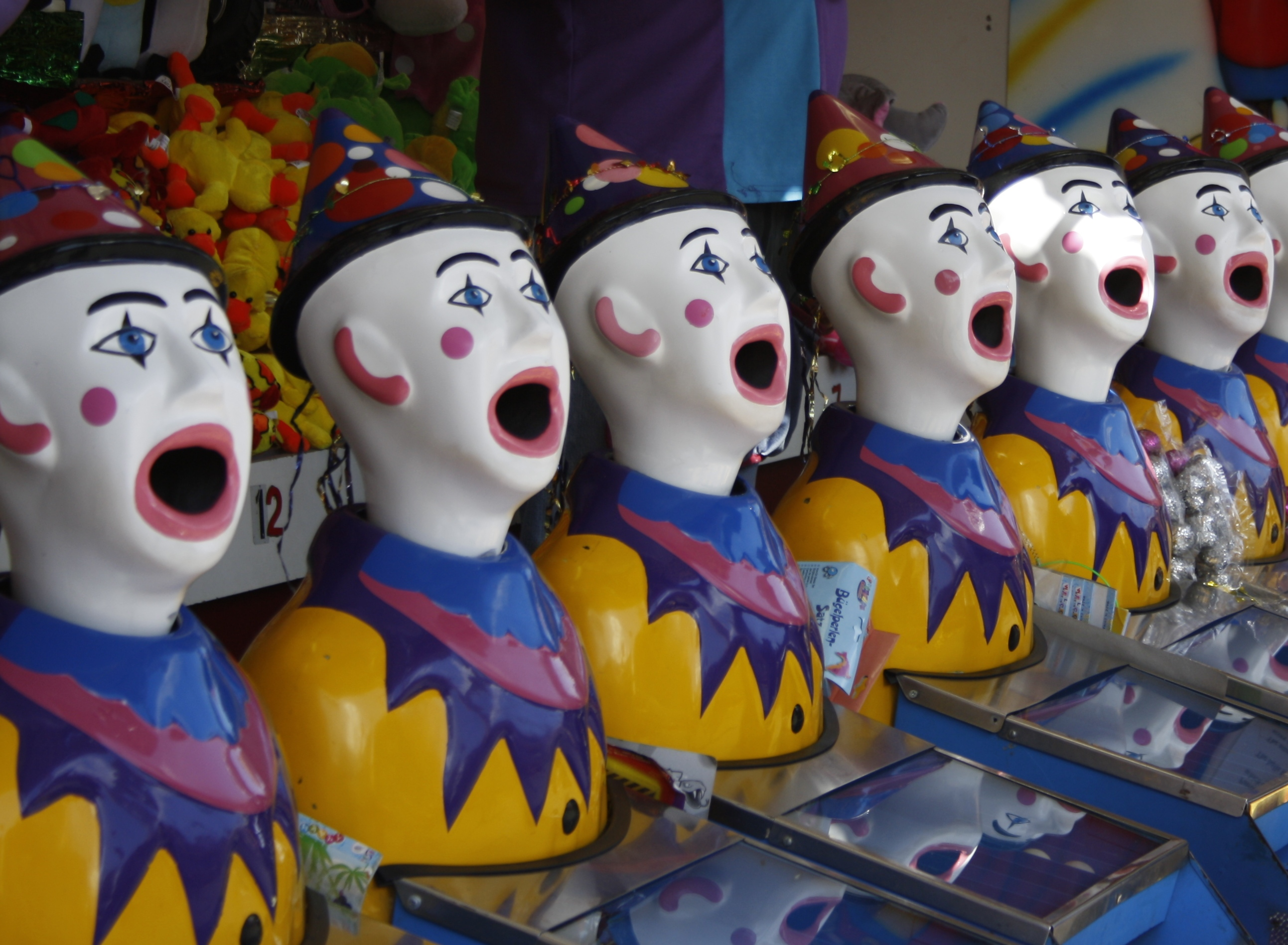
Clown game in Sideshow Alley, 2013

In the late 1960s, the face of Sideshow Alley, traditionally home to the weird and wonderful, began to change. The tents and booths largely disappeared, to be replaced with high technology rides, tests of skill and popular music entertainment.

Controversy was generated when the Queensland Government declared a state of emergency from 13 July to 2 August, during the 1971 South African Springbok Rugby team tour, when demonstrations against apartheid were held in Brisbane and throughout Australia. The main show ring at the Exhibition Ground was commandeered to host the matches, as a safe distance could be maintained between spectators and would-be protesters. A two-metre-high (6.6-foot) chain wire fence was erected to separate spectators from players.

A new two-storey brick building for use by the police during the annual show was completed for the 1971 Exhibition. It was located inside the main entrance from Gregory Terrace and replaced an earlier timber building. A new Members Stand was constructed in the 1970s.

Improvements and new buildings in the 1980s included:

- the refurbishment of the John McDonald Stand in 1985
- the construction of a new Exhibition Building in 1986 on the site of the Hall of Science building, at a cost of $2.5 million (with Queensland Government assistance)
- removal of the top seating tier of the Ernest Baynes Stand in 1986, following the Bradford Stadium collapse in England in 1985
- the opening on 28 November 1988 of the Walter Burnett Building

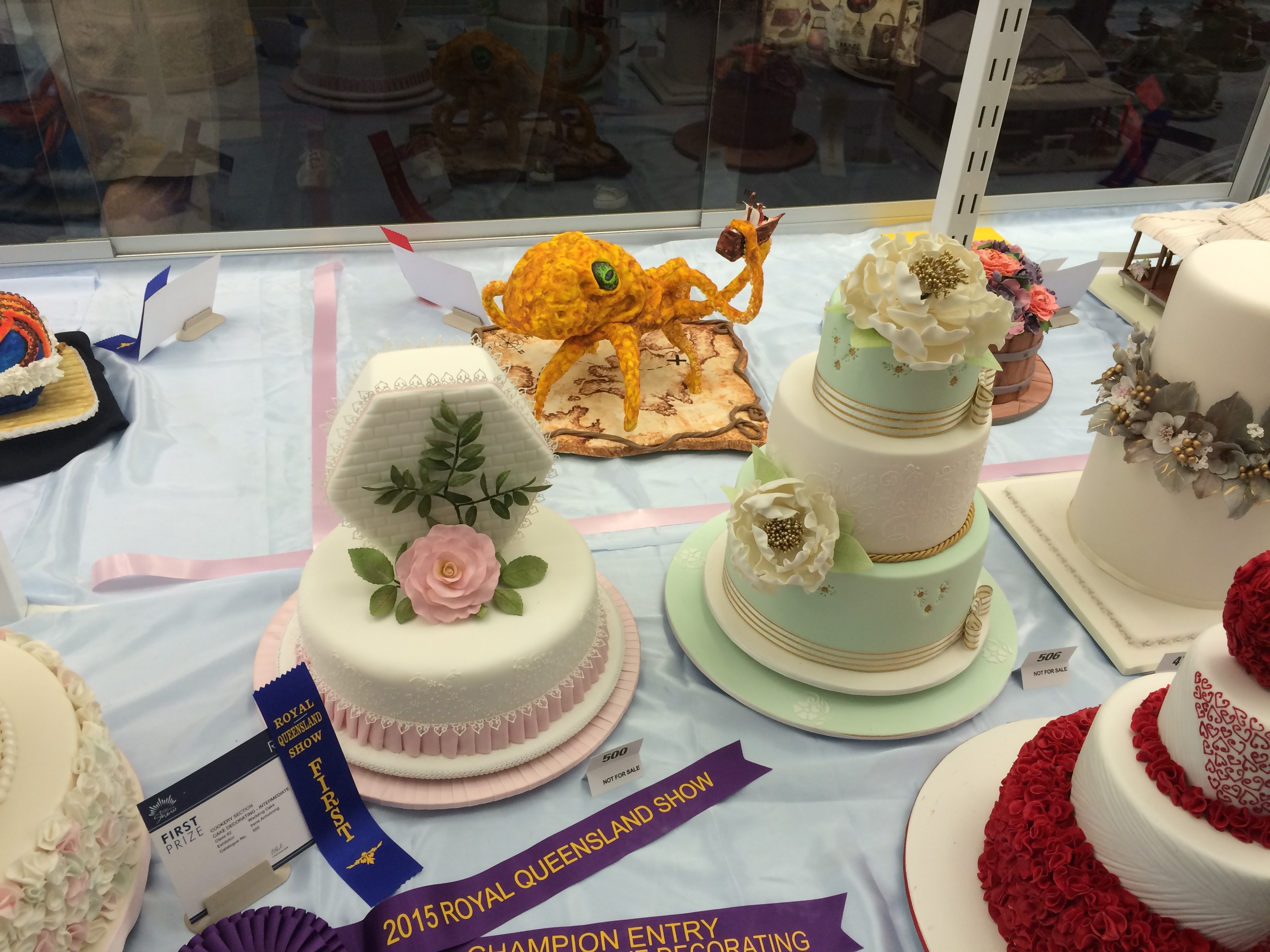
Cake icing with traditional and novelty designs in the Fine Arts competition, 2015

The Walter Burnett Building was designed by architects Hulme and Webster and is adjacent the Frank Nicklin Pavilion (honouring Queensland Premier Frank Nicklin) which accommodates fine arts exhibitions. The auditorium of the Walter Burnett Building seats 1000 people and is equipped with a stage and dance floor. Besides its importance to the annual Exhibition, the building is in constant use for all sorts of activities, including expositions, balls and conferences. It was also the venue for the first public airing of the Fitzgerald Inquiry Report on corruption in Queensland, on 3 July 1989.

In 2008, Bowen Hills – including the area of the Brisbane Exhibition Grounds – was declared an Urban Development Area under the Urban Land Development Act 2007 (replaced by the Economic Development Act 2012, with the term Priority Development Area superseding the term Urban Development Area).

The RNA launched a project to redevelop the showgrounds and in 2009 selected property and infrastructure company, Lendlease, as their redevelopment partner. In 2010, the RNA and Lendlease unveiled plans for the Brisbane Showgrounds Regeneration Project, a redevelopment of 5.5 hectares (14 acres) of the 22-hectare (54-acre) site; comprising an upgrade to the showgrounds' facilities and the inclusion of new office, retail and residential spaces. This involved the demolition and clearing of various buildings and areas – mostly concentrated in the southeastern portion of the site (bounded by Alexandria Street, St Pauls Terrace, Costin Street, Constance Street and Gregory Terrace). Buildings and areas demolished or removed by 2015 included: the Frank Nicklin Pavilion, Walter Burnett Building and Auditorium, Agricultural Hall and Douglas Wadley Pavilion, Frank Robertson Pavilion, Building No.4, Main Parade Food Stall and Show Time Snack Bar, Agricultural Street Bar, Machinery Street Fish Place, Agricultural Open Area, Industrial Open Area, Police Exhibit and chairlift. The plans for the project were approved in 2010 and construction began in April 2011. The project is expected to take 15 years to complete, at a projected cost of $2.9 billion.

The association with regional Queensland and the rural tradition has been and will remain central to the character of the Brisbane Exhibition and the grounds in which it is held, but the RNA has incorporated new ideas and technology to meet the expectations of today's show patrons. In recent years new attractions at the Exhibition Grounds have included communications technology displays.

In December 2023, Queensland announced a proposal to build a 20,000-seat stadium at the RNA; its main tenants would have been the Brisbane Lions and Cricket Australia, serving as a temporary stadium while The Gabba was reconstructed for the 2032 Summer Olympics. It would have cost $137 million, with a third covered by the state, and the rest covered by Brisbane City Council, the Lions, and Cricket Australia. After the completion of the Gabba, the stadium would have been reduced to 12,000 seats. The proposed stadium was criticised by local officials, with Lord Mayor Adrian Schrinner stating that Brisbane 2032 had "become more about overpriced stadiums rather than the promise of vital transport solutions". Stating that the RNA stadium was the "final straw", Schrinner announced that he would therefore withdraw his support for the Gabba reconstruction project. The Gabba project was scrapped in March 2024.

== Use as a sports ground ==
Sport has also been a major feature at the Brisbane Showgrounds. Sports played at the Showgrounds have included:

- Soccer
  The Australia men's national soccer team occasionally played at the Exhibition Ground, with full international matches being played in 1933 (New Zealand), 1938 (India) and 1969 (Greece). They also played other exhibition matches in 1927 (Bohemians billed as "Czecho-Slovakia"), 1937 (England Amateurs), 1941 (Chinese XI), 1949 (Hajduk Split billed as Yugoslavia) and 1975 (Legia Warsaw). The showgrounds also hosted a number of Queensland state matches.
- Baseball
  The Australian Baseball League team Brisbane Bandits was based at the ground during the early 1990s. They returned to the ground in 2010 for the first season of the revamped Australian Baseball League. The end of the 2010–11 season was interrupted by the 2010–11 Queensland floods, with many games postponed and cancelled.
- Cricket
  28 first-class cricket matches were played between 1893 and 1931, including two Tests and 13 Sheffield Shield matches. The first ever Queensland Sheffield Shield game was played at the ground, with Queensland losing to longtime arch-rivals New South Wales.
  The Test against England in 1928/29 was the first Test played in Brisbane and was the debut of Don Bradman who scored 18 and 1. The Third Test of the series against the West Indies in 1930/31 was the last first-class fixture at the ground. Revenue from the two Tests was disappointing, largely because of the numbers who got in for free by using their agricultural society badges, and the Queensland Cricket Association moved down the road to the Gabba.
- Rugby league
  Rugby League was played at the Exhibition Grounds before the QRL moved to Lang Park.
  The Brisbane Exhibition Ground hosted many International, State and club games. At the Exhibition Ground Great Britain won the first Ashes series on Australian soil. Rugby league holds the attendance record for the ground with 40,500 (with a further estimated 10,000 locked out) on 6 July during one of the 1946 Great Britain Lions tour's England v Australia test matches.
- Tennis
  In 1895 the first inter-colonial tennis match took place with Queensland playing New South Wales.
- Cycling
  In 1896 the ground was used for cycling.
- Rugby union
  It hosted one of the most controversial rugby union games in 1971 when Australia took on South Africa – the game was switched from Ballymore because it was easier to erect barricades at the Exhibition Ground.

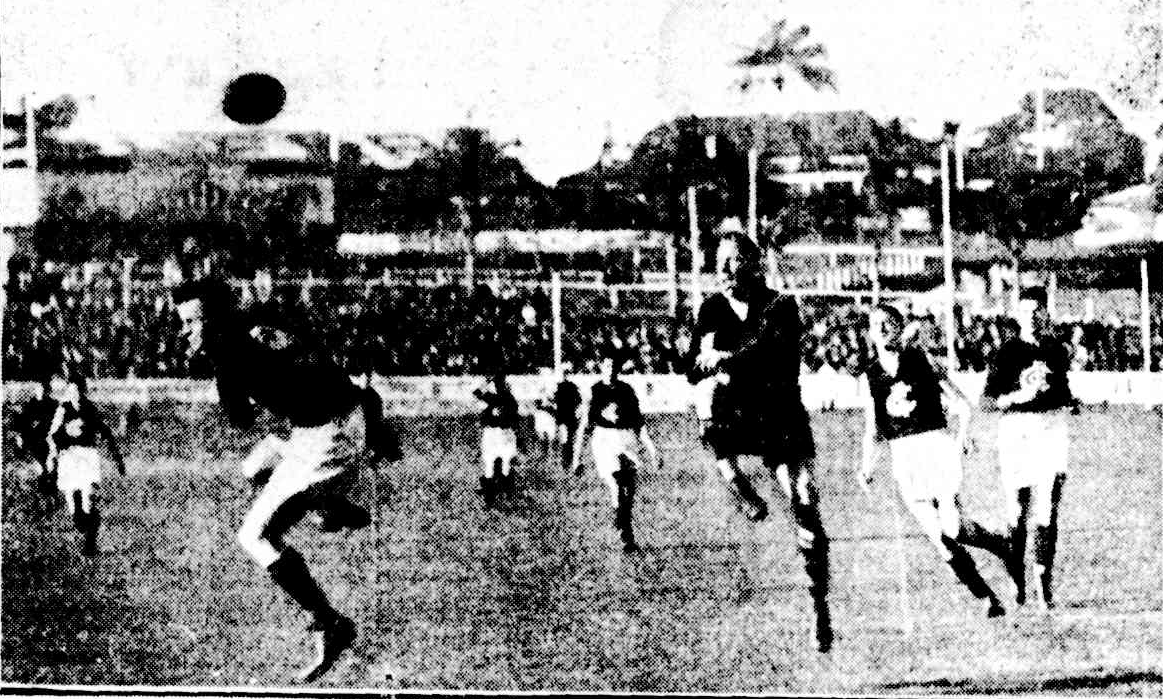
VFL clubs Carlton and Richmond at Brisbane Exhibition Ground in 1930

- Australian rules football
  It was the primary home of Australian rules football in Queensland from 1905 to 1914, with interstate matches and QFL played there.
  A VFL exhibition match was played between powerhouse clubs Carlton FC and Richmond FC at the Exhibition Ground in 1930 drew 12,000. The ground hosted the 1950 Interstate Carnival.
  The ground was also host to a VFL premiership match, Geelong vs Essendon, as part of Round 8, 1952. All VFL matches that week were moved to country and interstate venues in an effort to spread interest in the game. Originally to be played on a Saturday night, the match was rescheduled due to torrential rain. Essendon (23.17) defeated Geelong (12.14) by 69 points the following Monday night in the first official VFL match to be played under floodlights.
  In 2022, the ground was floated as an option for an alternate home ground for the Brisbane Lions while their usual home ground The Gabba is demolished and rebuilt for the 2032 Summer Olympics.
- Motorsport
  Starting in 1926, the Brisbane Showgrounds was home to Dirt track racing in Brisbane. motorcycle speedway, Sprintcars, Super Sedans, and Speedcars headlined many a Saturday night show during the summer months with many famous competitors racing at the 425-metre (465-yard) track, including Speedcar drivers Jack Brabham, Ray and Howard Revell, George Tattnell, Bob "Two Gun" Tattersall, Blair Shepherd and Ron Wanless. The cars stopped using the venue during the early 1980s in favour of the Archerfield Speedway.
- Motorcycle speedway
  The Showgrounds were a significant speedway venue, hosting multiple qualifying rounds of the Speedway World Championship. Solo riders, Ivan Mauger, John Titman, Steve Regeling, Troy Butler, Billy Sanders, Phil Crump, Jason Crump, Sam Ermolenko, Simon Wigg, Leigh Adams, Craig Boyce and Tony Rickardsson all raced at the venue. The Brisbane Showgrounds continued to host motorcycle racing into the late 1990s including holding events such as the national championship of Australia (held at the Ekka in 1934 (3 lap), 1947 (4 lap), 1949 (4 lap), 1951, 52 and 53 (Champion of Champions), 1974, 1981, 1990, 1993 and 1997). The Showgrounds also hosted the Australian Sidecar Championship in 1961, 1962 and 1992. The venue also hosted rounds of the Australian Speedway Masters Series (also known as the "Series 500") between 1995 and 2000. The Showgrounds traditionally held the Grand Final of the Series 500.

== Description ==
The Brisbane Showgrounds is located north of the Brisbane central business district, in Bowen Hills. It is bounded on the north by O'Connell Terrace, on the west by Bowen Park and Bowen Bridge Road, on the south by Gregory Terrace and Costin Street, on the southeast by St Paul's Terrace, and on the east by Exhibition Street and Brookes Street. Gregory Terrace transects the grounds, but is closed to traffic during the annual August exhibition. The Exhibition railway line bisects the grounds in a southwest–northeast direction, while the Clem Jones road tunnel (Clem7) opened in 2010 passes under the grounds in a north–south direction.

The Showgrounds contain an extensive number of buildings and structures which, along with the layout of the grounds and plantings (including numerous mature weeping fig trees), contribute to the cultural heritage significance of the place. For the purpose of description, the Showgrounds has been divided into eight areas. Individual building numbers are those identified in the Royal National Association Masterplan Report prepared by Bligh Voller Nield in 2000.

=== Area 1 ===
The hub of the Showgrounds is the Main Arena and surrounding grandstands located to the north of Gregory Terrace. Principal elements of cultural heritage significance include:

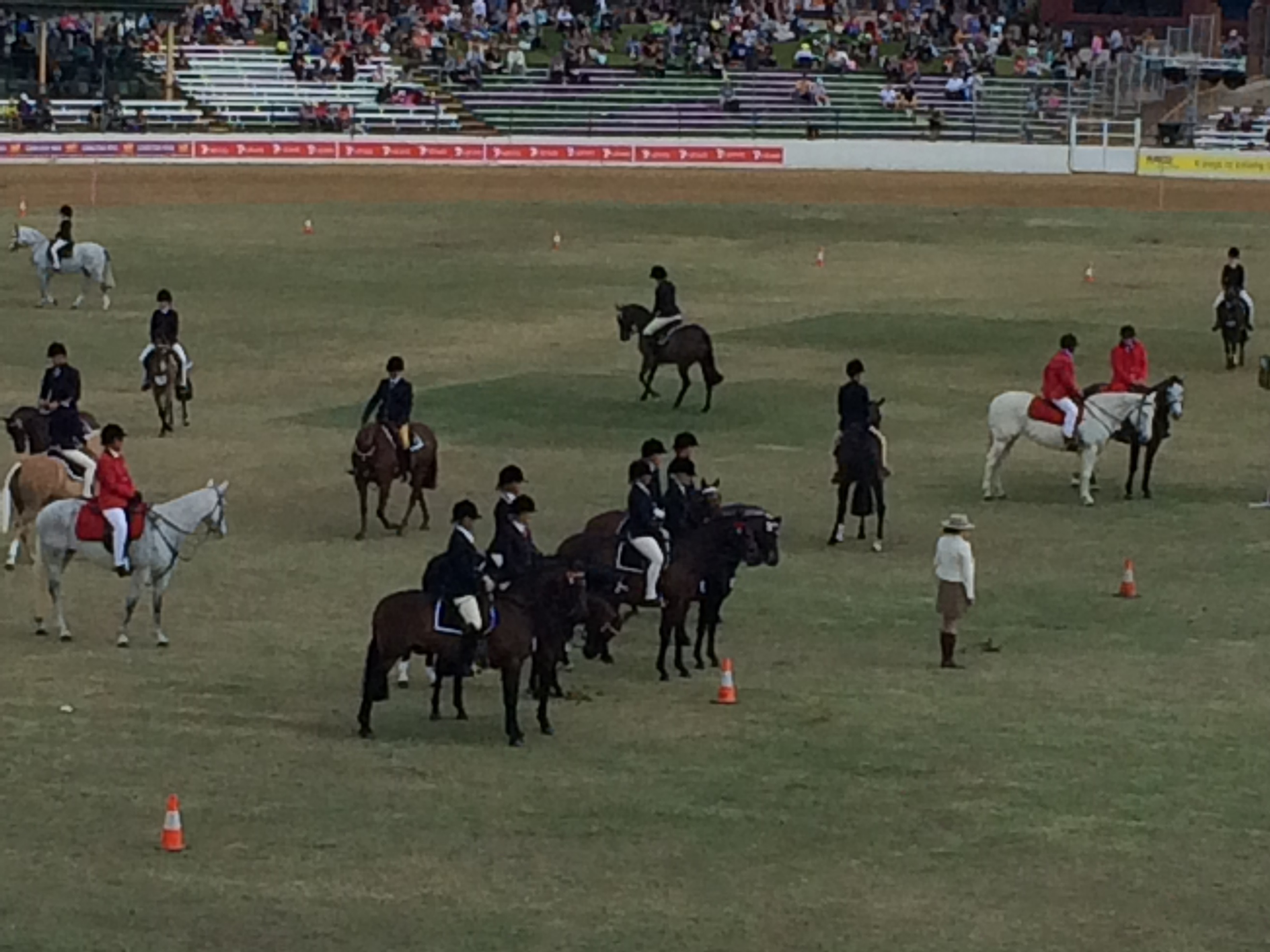
Equestrian competitions in the main show ring, 2015

==== 1. Main Arena (Show Ring No.1) (by 1891) ====
The Main Arena, an oval-shaped grassed area with a perimeter gravel track, is located in the centre of the Brisbane Showgrounds, on the northwest side of Gregory Terrace. It is surrounded by tiered seating stands, both open and covered, the exception being at the northeast end, where the marshalling yards give livestock and vehicle access directly to the ring. At the southwest end are the Council Stand (c. 1923) and Ernest Baynes Stand (1923); to the west the Members' Stand (1970s) and John MacDonald Stand (1906); to the north the open-air Machinery Hill Stands (1950s); to the northeast the Marshalling Yards and Stand (1950s); to the east and southeast a narrow band of open-air seating; and to the south is Heritage Hill, a grassed, informal seating area. Between the Ernest Baynes and Members' stands is a concrete ceremonial platform at the edge of the ring.

==== 2. RNA Council Stand (c. 1923) ====
The RNA Council Stand is located to the south of Show Ring No.1, adjacent to the Ernest Baynes Stand, overlooking the show ring. It is a three-storey brick building with a double hipped roof. There is also a small, hip-roofed tower at the southeast corner of the building. At some early period the northern end of the building has been extended to incorporate an entrance to the seating in front of the stand. There is a later two-storey extension on the southern side. The three earlier facades retain their face brickwork with decorative rendered bands.

The building accommodates offices, meeting rooms, and Councillors' seating stand, with the main access to the stand being through the building, which is entered through a wide, centrally positioned entrance with a slate roof supported by double columns either side of the entrance. To the left of this entrance is a brass plaque bearing a dedication to military personnel stationed at the Exhibition Grounds during the first and second world wars. The middle level of the building contains a number of offices, including that of the President of the RNA and the Councillors' stand which is on the northern side of the building. This has timber seating tiers with timber seats, on the back rests of which are attached small metal ash trays at regular intervals. Cantilevered metal trusses carry the roof forward over the front seating. Photographic evidence suggests this is a replacement roof, the original being supported by front posts. The ceiling is lined with fibrous cement sheeting, sections of which have early timber cover- strips.

Internal stairs lead from the middle level to a lower floor where the RNA Council Meeting Room is located, overlooking the arena. There is also access to open-air seating in front of the RNA Council Stand from this level. Another internal staircase, which is not original, leads from the entrance level to the upper floor, which contains offices. The interior has been refurbished.

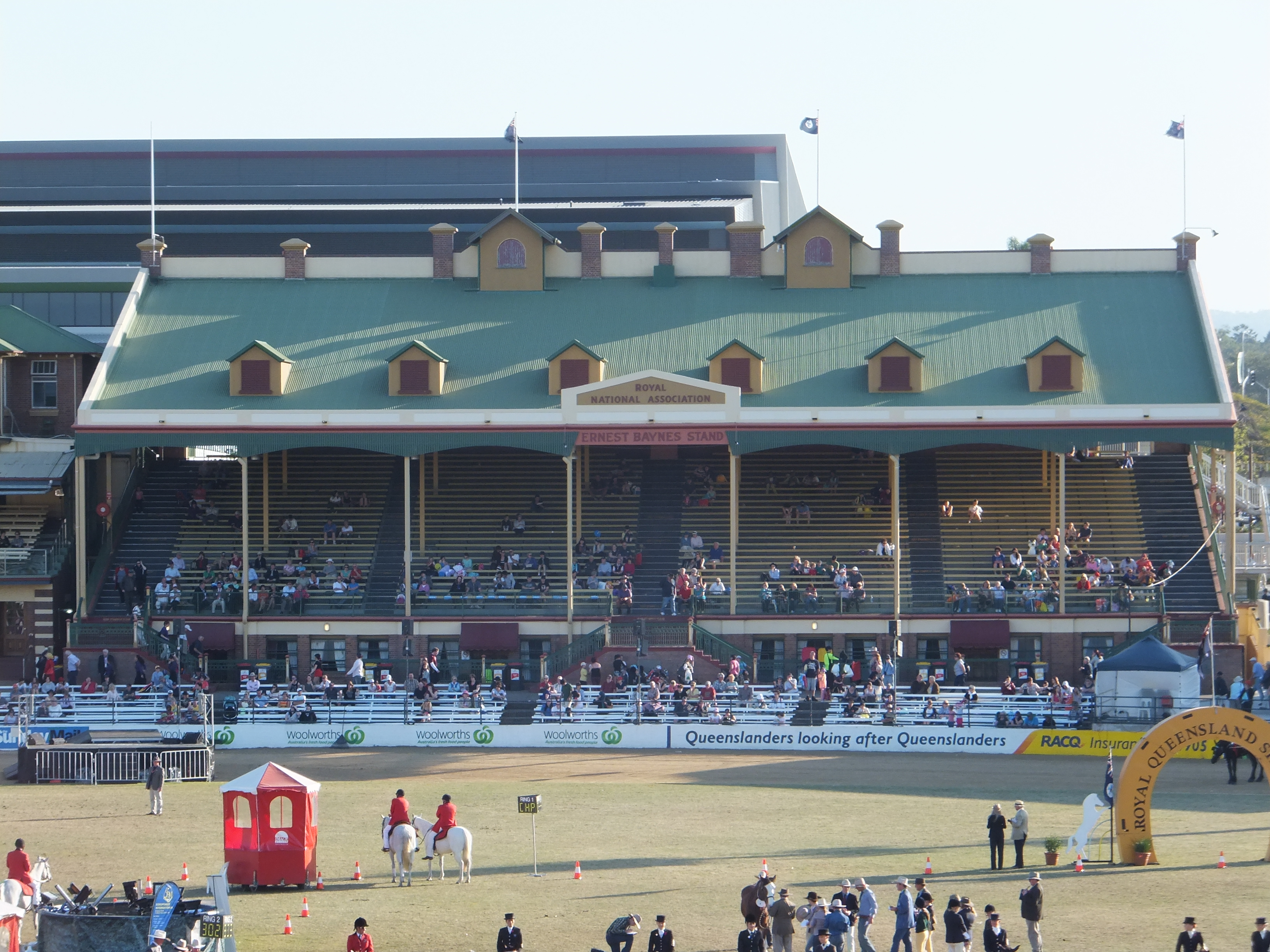
Ernest Baynes Stand, 2013

==== 3. Ernest Baynes Stand (1922–23) ====
The Ernest Baynes Stand is a substantial brick structure located to the southwest of the Main Arena, adjacent to the Council Stand. It features face brickwork with decorative rendered panels along the parapet and in a broad band across the middle of the facade. At street level, offices open directly off the street. There is a later cantilevered awning with mock gabled roofs over the western end of this level. The eastern end is obscured by a set of concrete fire escape stairs with offices beneath. Cantilevered off the rear wall parapet are two small landings with later gabled roofs, which formerly serviced two rear staircases between the upper and lower seating tiers.

The building has a skillion roof clad with later metal sheeting, supported by early steel girders (both uprights and trusses) and is lined with sheets of ripple iron. The original gambrel roof has been removed and the present roof follows the slope of the former upper seating tier, which has been removed. Along the ringside front of the roof are six mock dormers and a central pediment with the lettering: RNA EXHIBITION GROUNDS. Beneath this, at fascia level, is the lettering: ERNEST BAYNES STAND. Timber batten valances along the front and side of the roof are not original.

The stand now comprises only one level of timber tiered seating (originally two), with slatted timber benches and back rests, supported on steel frames bolted to the floor. The seating is accessed via three sets of brick and concrete stairs at the front of the stand. These are located at either end of the structure and in the middle, the central stair having a double staircase. Set into the front brick wall of each staircase is an inscribed stone plaque. That at the southeast end reads: "This stone was laid by CE McDougall, President 18th Nov 1922 J Hutchinson, Builder." That in the centre stair reads: "This stone was laid by His Excellency, Sir Matthew Nathan PC, GCMG, Governor of Queensland 18th Nov 1922 Richard Gailey Jnr FOIA, Architect." That on the northwest stair reads: "This stone was laid by Ernest Baynes, Chairman, for and on behalf of the Council 18th Nov 1922." This stone also records the names of the 13 other RNA Councillors of the day and the Secretary. The front and staircase balustrades are of decorative cast iron with timber handrails, but the side balustrades are a later metal grille. At the top of the seating, later fire-exit doors have been cut in the brick rear wall at either end – these lead to fire-escape stairs.

The structure takes advantage of the sloping site to include a sub-floor dining room which runs the length of the stand beneath the front seating. This is accessed via stairs at the front which lead to a number of sets of entrance doors just below ground level. This dining room has been refurbished, with new entrance doors, new leadlight windows and a false ceiling. Most of the original arched leadlight windows at each end have been sheeted over. Behind the dining room, cut into the slope of the land, is a long kitchen. At the southeast end of the kitchen is a store room and a steep timber stair leading up to the service entrance. There are also toilets at the sub-floor level, accessed externally. The men's toilet is located at the southeast end of the building and the women's at the northwest end.

==== 4. Members' Stand (1970s) ====
The Members' Stand is located on the western side of the Main Arena, just past the Ernest Baynes Stand and the Parenting Room. It is a concrete-framed structure with brick in-fill. The seating tiers are of formed concrete and seats are of formed plastic supported on metal framing. Steel framing supports a cantilevered awning roof. The roof and side and rear walls are clad with wide-profile metal sheeting. There is a metal sheeted balustrade along the sides and front. The sub-floor contains a bar and other members facilities.

==== 5. John MacDonald Stand (1906) ====
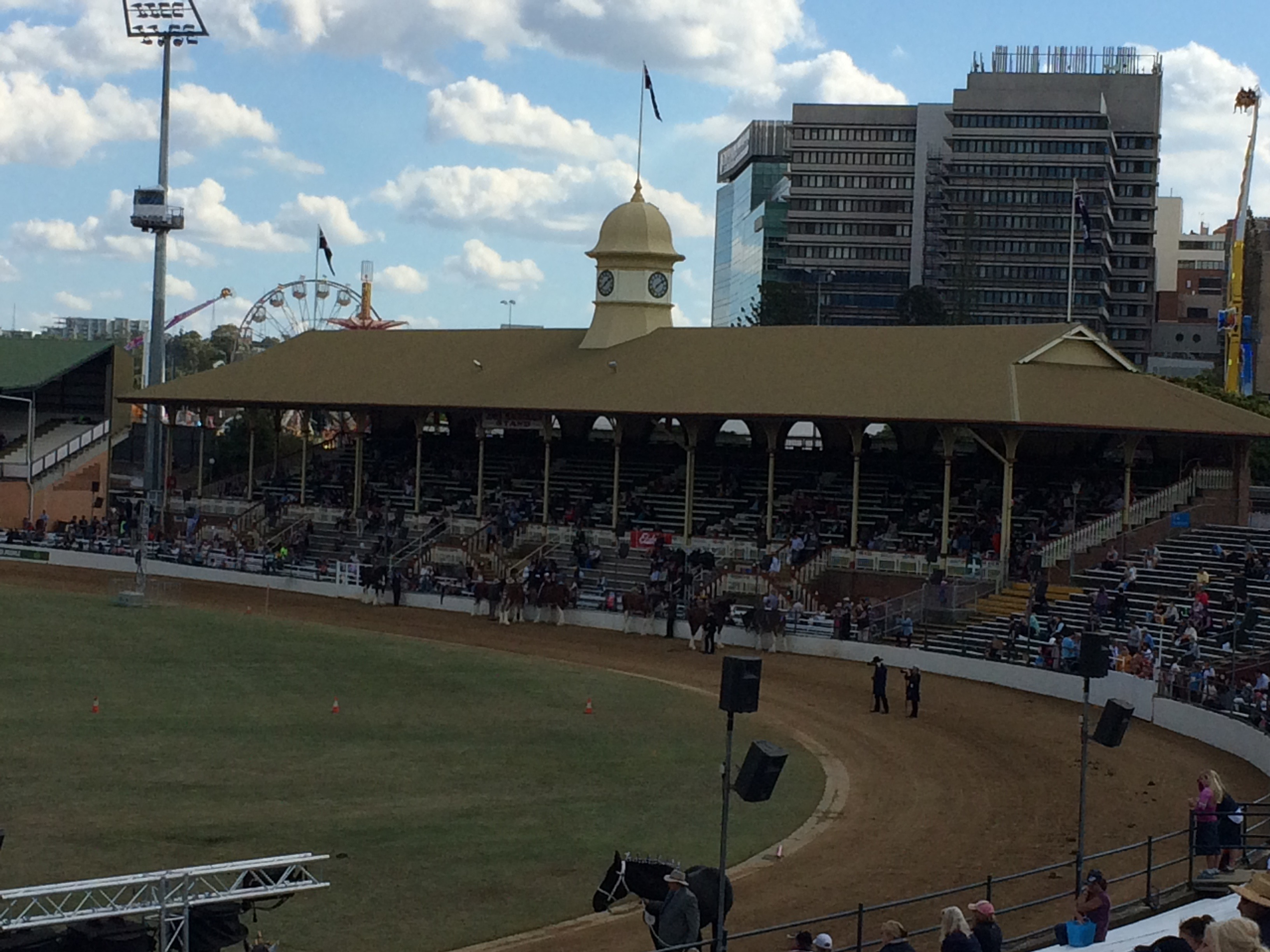
John MacDonald Stand, 2015

This is the earliest of the surviving ringside stands, located on the northwest side of the Main Arena. It is a substantial brick structure with a gambrel roof. In the centre of the roof is a large fleche with cupola and four-faced clock which can be seen from much of the showgrounds. The roof of the stand, which has been re-clad with a recent corrugated metal sheeting, is supported on early light steel trusses and round cast metal columns with cast-iron brackets and valances along the front and sides. Between the arc of the central bay is a large sign with the lettering: JOHN MACDONALD STAND. The sides and front of the stand have a decorative cast-iron balustrading.

Timber tiers accommodate the seating, which is of slatted timber fixed on steel frames to the tiers. The seating is accessed from the front of the stand via three sets of brick and concrete steps, set symmetrically in the centre and toward either end, each of which has a double staircase. These have the same decorative iron balustrade as the main stand. Between the staircases at the front of the stand are concrete seating tiers with slatted timber benches. Behind the seating tiers the rear brick wall has arched openings with the same decorative metal balustrade as the stairs and front and sides of the stand. There is a rear promenade at this level, but several tiers of later timber seating have been installed here, restricting pedestrian circulation.

Because the land is flat and the stand is so high, there is a very tall rear arcade promenade (traffic-able to vehicles and pedestrians) running the length of the stand beneath the upper seats and a huge sub-floor beneath the remainder of the stand. The brickwork in this section of the building is in red face brick, with decorative dark-glazed bricks to the arches along the arcade and supporting the upper seating tiers.

The large sub-floor is divided into four main rooms, accessed mainly off the rear promenade. Each of these spaces has a ripple iron ceiling which follows the slope of the seating tiers above, a concrete floor a step or two below street level and windows and doors opening both to the promenade and to the front of the stand overlooking the arena. The northern room is utilised by the St John's Ambulance Service and has been divided by sheeted partitions into cubicles. Facilities include an early iron-framed, wheeled ambulance stretcher. The southern room has been converted into an English-style pub, complete with appropriately decorated entry. There are toilets located at each end of the subfloor, accessed from the front – the men's toilet at the southern end and the women's at the northern end. The men's toilet retains an early lead-light fanlight above the entrance door, but both facilities have been remodelled internally.

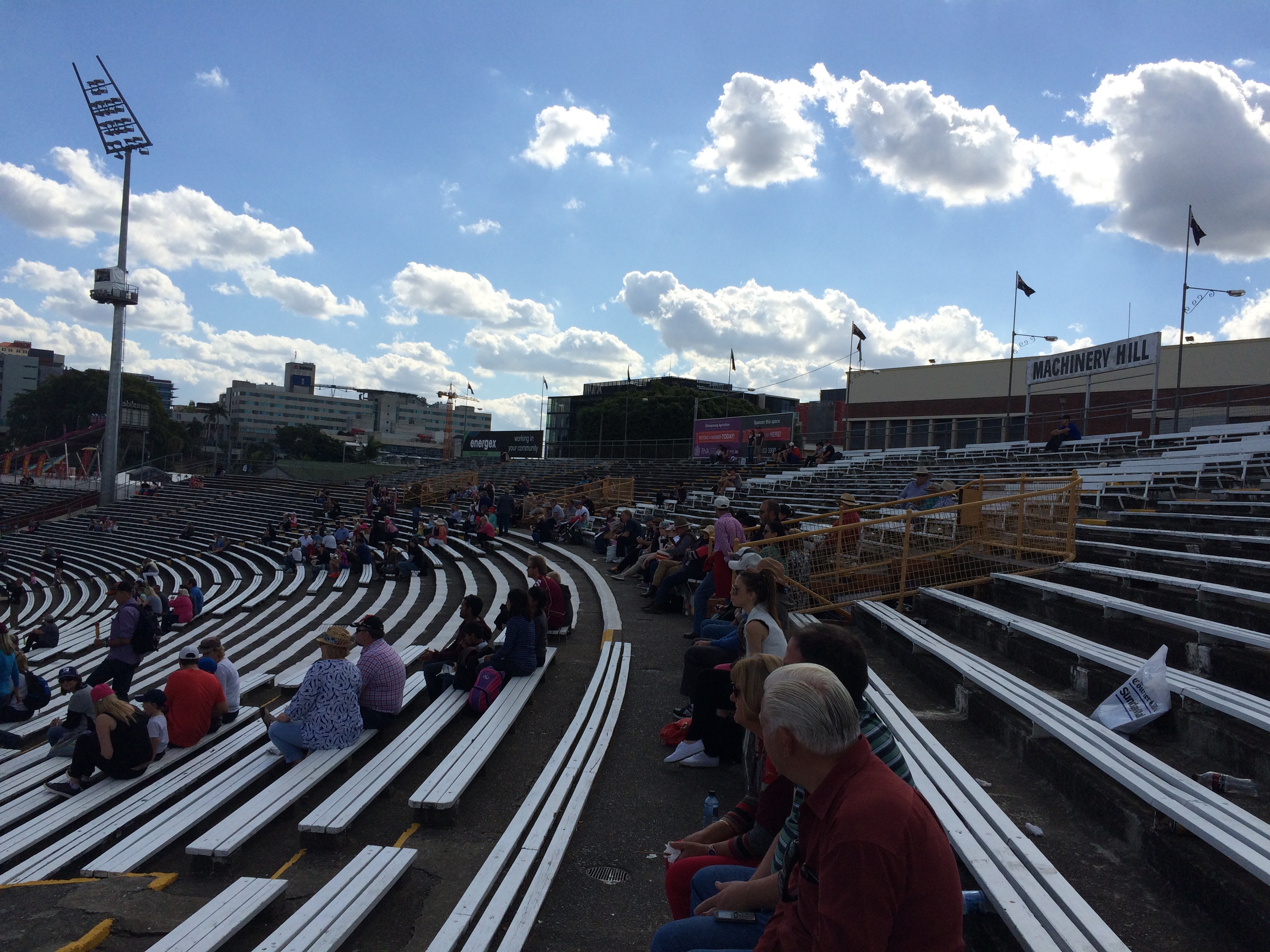
Machinery Hill Stand, 2015

==== 6. Machinery Hill Stands (1950s) ====
These consist of a number of uncovered stands, curved around the northern perimeter of the Main Arena, between the northeast end of the John MacDonald Stand and the Marshalling Yards at the northeast end of the arena. They are of concrete construction (concrete seating tiers supported on concrete piers), with brick or concrete in-fill to the sides. The seating consists of curved, slatted timber benches and is accessed via subways beneath the stands. The sub-floor beneath the northernmost stand provides kiosk space, with metal roller doors between the concrete piers opening to Ring Road. The sub-floor beneath the middle stand is utilised as the Cattleman's Bar. Sections of the seating on the northernmost of these open-air stands have been in-filled recently to provide access for horsemen entering the show ring for special display riding. There is a large sign at the back of the northern stand, with the lettering: MACHINERY HILL, which can be viewed from all over the show ring.

==== 7. Marshalling Yards and Stand (1950s) ====
At the northeast side of the Main Arena are the livestock marshalling yards. Above the yards is a substantial formed concrete stand with a raked, open-air seating area. Between the concrete piers which support this structure are sets of sheeted metal gates opening from the yards onto the arena. At the back of the concrete stand is a small, detached, two-storey brick office building.

==== 7a. Commentators' Building ====
The Commentator's Building incorporates the Radio Broadcast Studio, Doctor's Office and Ringmaster's Office.

At the southern end of the marshalling yards is another small, detached, two-storey brick building, which accommodates a radio broadcast studio on the upper floor and doctor's office and garage on the ground floor. This building appears to have been constructed in two stages. Attached to the southern end of this small building is a highset, steel-framed extension clad with fibrous cement boarding. This contains a number of offices, including that of the Ringmaster, accessed from a walkway at the rear.

==== 8. Former Commonwealth Bank Building (1929) ====
The Former Commonwealth Bank Building (now the Show Shop) is located to the south of the Main Arena, adjacent to the Council Stand. It is a rectangular, single-storey rendered brick building with a hipped, terracotta-tile roof. There is an early arched entrance on the eastern side, flanked by tall, arched, steel-framed windows with decorative keystones and false balustrades. The present entrance is via a recent, single-storey metal and glass extension at the southern end of the building. The north elevation has been modified at some period, with its earlier arched windows removed.

Internally, the building comprises one main interior space (the former banking chamber), partitioned from a smaller space at the northern end, which is at a lower level, reflecting the slope of the land. There is also a later mezzanine storage area at the northern end. All bank fittings have been removed.

Other structures/sites in Area 1 include:

- Parenting Room (c. 1990s) – a small, single-storey, steel framed and metal clad building located between the Ernest Baynes and Members' stands
- QCWA Refreshment Rooms (c. 1970s) – a small, single-storey brick structure with metal-clad skillion roof located between the Members' Stand and the John MacDonald Stand
- Heritage Hill with its "lychgate" – a timber-framed, shingle-roofed structure resting on a foundation of rubble stone set in concrete.

=== Area 2 ===
This is the area to the southwest of the Main Arena, bound by the Ernest Baynes Stand, Gregory Terrace, the former Museum Reserve and the railway line. The principal elements of cultural heritage significance in this area include:

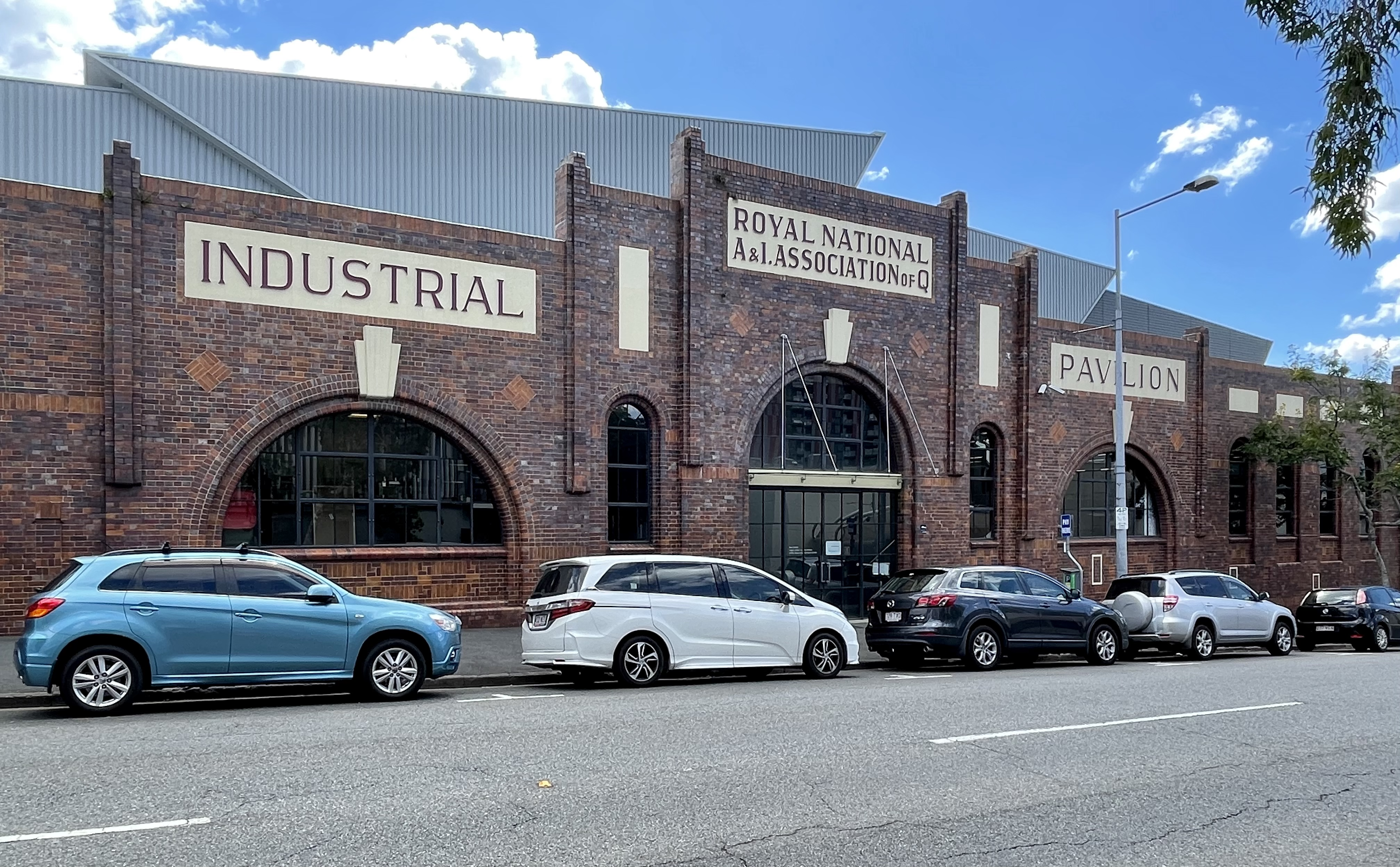
Industrial Pavilion, 2021

==== 9. Industrial Pavilion (1938–39) ====
The Industrial Pavilion, built in 1938–39 and later extended, is a large industrial structure with external brick walls and a saw tooth roof. It occupies the southwest corner of the site, with its southeast wall fronting directly onto Gregory Terrace.

The external walls are red face brickwork with the main facade and the Gregory Terrace elevation designed with some of the characteristics of the stripped classical style. The main eastern facade and entrance to the building is from within the Showgrounds. This is a two-storey section which has food shops at ground level and offices and meeting rooms on the first floor level. The two principal entrances to the building are openings large enough to accommodate trucks and other vehicles. The entrances are emphasised by stylised columns, capitals and entablatures with balconies above. Sets of three French doors open onto the balconies. The food shops have metal security doors that open upwards. The first floor level is delineated on the facade by a rendered stringcourse. All the windows on the upper level have round headed windows containing steel framed eight pane casements. The panels below the windows contain a decorative pattern of brickwork. The building has been extended to the northwest and this extension is distinguished on the facade by mottled patterned brickwork, simplified detailing, large multi-paned window and corrugated metal sun shading.

The facade along Gregory Terrace is a decorative composition of stepped parapets, patterned brickwork and round-headed window openings. There are a number of large arched openings with stylised keystones, which contain doorways into the building. In the parapet there is raised lettering with the words 'INDUSTRIAL, "ROYAL NATIONAL A & I ASSOCIATION", "PAVILION". The wall of the building forms part of the perimeter wall of the Showgrounds.

Internally, the building is one large open space with the saw-tooth roof supported by steel trusses on I-section columns. Twelve sets of large skylights run at 45 degrees across the space providing natural light. The ceiling is lined with sheet material and the floor is bitumen. The building is mechanically ventilated.

==== 10. Gregory Terrace Entry Building (c. 1910) ====
The Gregory Terrace Entry Building is a two-storey timber building with a brick extension, which forms part of the perimeter wall of the Showgrounds. The timber building has a gabled-hipped roof clad with corrugated metal sheet. It has undergone changes, in particular at the ground floor level, which is now used as a space to park cars. The northwest external wall has been removed and replaced with three steel posts. The area in which the cars are parked has a pressed metal ceiling. At the first floor level the northwest veranda has been enclosed and extended and the roofline has been altered. The first level contained one large room, which has been subdivided with partitions. This room has six sets of French doors, which open onto the enclosed veranda and six windows on the Gregory Terrace elevation. The room retains its pressed metal ceiling and fittings such as a row of coat hooks.

At the northeast end of the building is a two-storey cream brick annexe (erected 1971), which is used by the police during the period of the Ekka. The building has a flat roof, with a large fascia and aluminium window frames.

Other buildings in Area 2 include:

- 11. RNA Administration Building (c. 1970) – a two-storey building constructed with a concrete frame and brick and sheet material infill panels. The building is designed as a series of vertical elements with a continuous band of windows at each level and a large projecting fascia concealing the roof. Internally the building contains offices.
- 12. RNA Function Room – a single-storey brick building with a flat roof. On the eastern & southern elevations there are full-length glass windows, mosaic tiles on the columns and a deep fascia concealing the roof. Internally the building is one large room with attached kitchen facilities.

=== Area 3 ===
This encompasses the area to the west of the railway which traverses the Showgrounds. The principal elements of cultural heritage significance in Area 3 include:

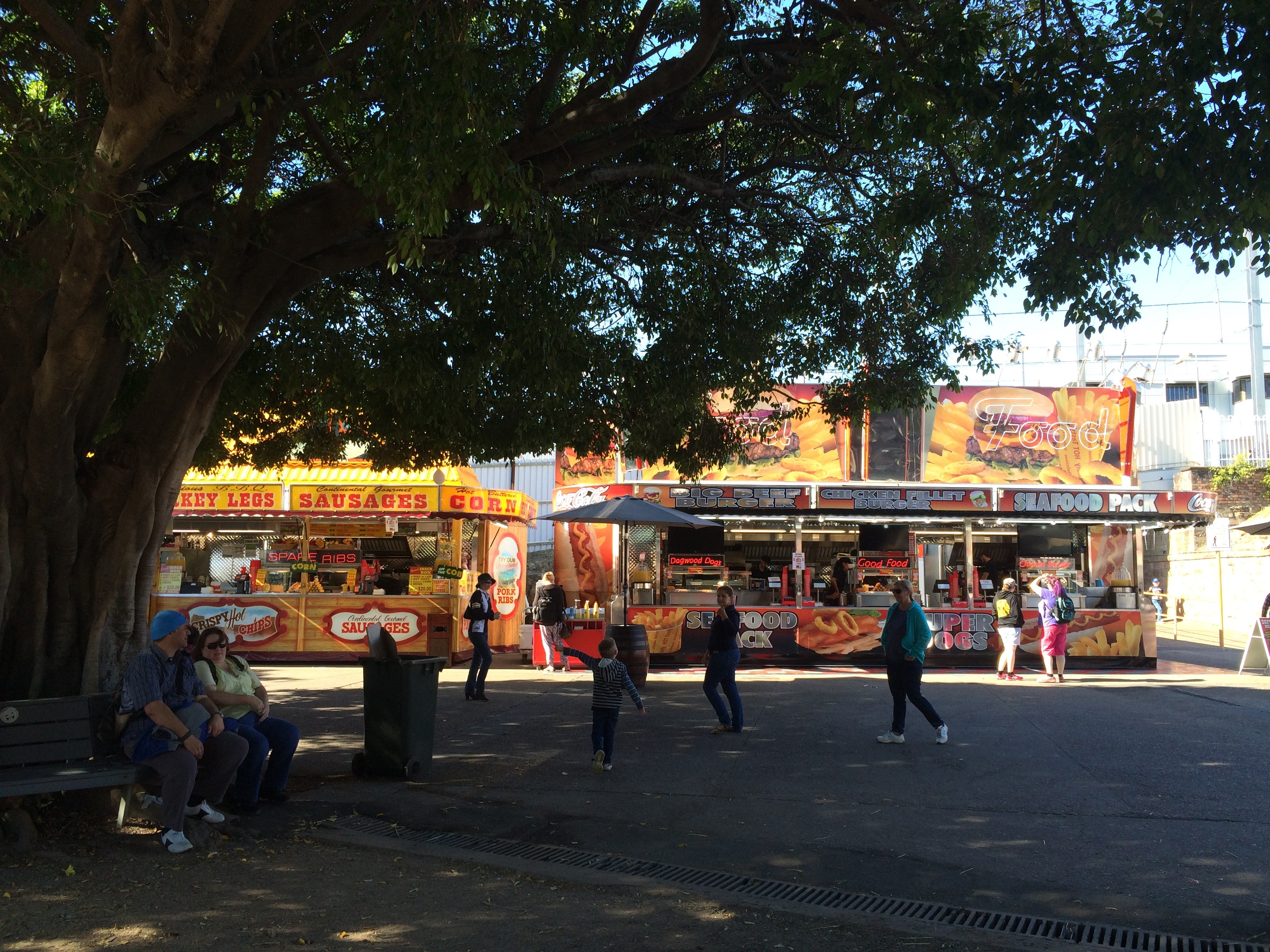
Food stalls around the fig trees, 2015

==== 13. Show Ring No.2 (c. 1924) ====
Show Ring No.2 is located on the western side of the railway line, at the northeast end of the bitumen pavement to Sideshow Alley and separates the amusement section of the site from the Dairy, Pig and Goat Pavilions. It is a circular grassed area surrounded by a concrete apron. Seven mature fig trees pruned into cylindrical forms line the southern boundary of the show ring and one fig tree of a similar form is located to the north of the ring. Timber bench seats are located around the base of each tree.

==== Toilet Block (interwar) ====
Located on the southeast side of the show ring and set into the earth bank which rises up to the railway line is a toilet building. This houses female amenities and a baby change room. The walls are a combination of face brickwork and rendered masonry with high level fixed vent glass louvres. The roof consists of two intersecting gables and is clad with metal custom orb roof sheeting.

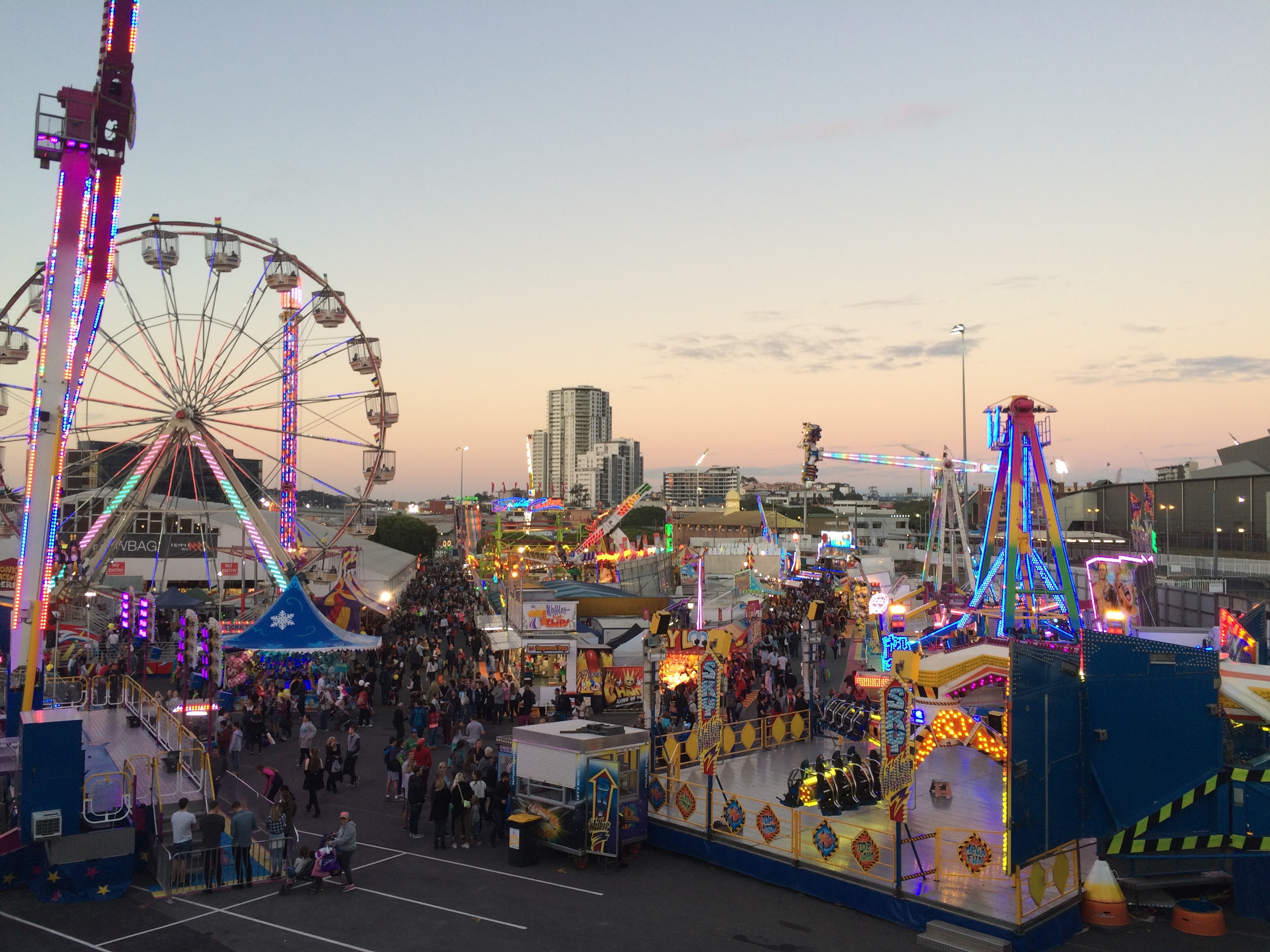
Sideshow Alley at dusk, 2015

==== 14. Sideshow Alley ====
Sideshow Alley is located in the northwest corner of the exhibition grounds and is bound by Bowen Bridge Road on the west, Bowen Park on the northwest, Show Ring No.2 to the northeast and the railway line to the southeast. The site is enclosed by a combination of fencing types which include timber framed fencing with corrugated iron cladding to Bowen Park and the railway boundaries, masonry to the Bowen Bridge Road frontage and new infill sections of metal fencing to other areas. The sense of enclosure to this part of the site is further heightened by its sunken level, relative to its surrounds and the close proximity of the Old Museum Building, the John MacDonald Stand, the mature vegetation of Bowen Park and the towering structures of the neighbouring Royal Brisbane Hospital.

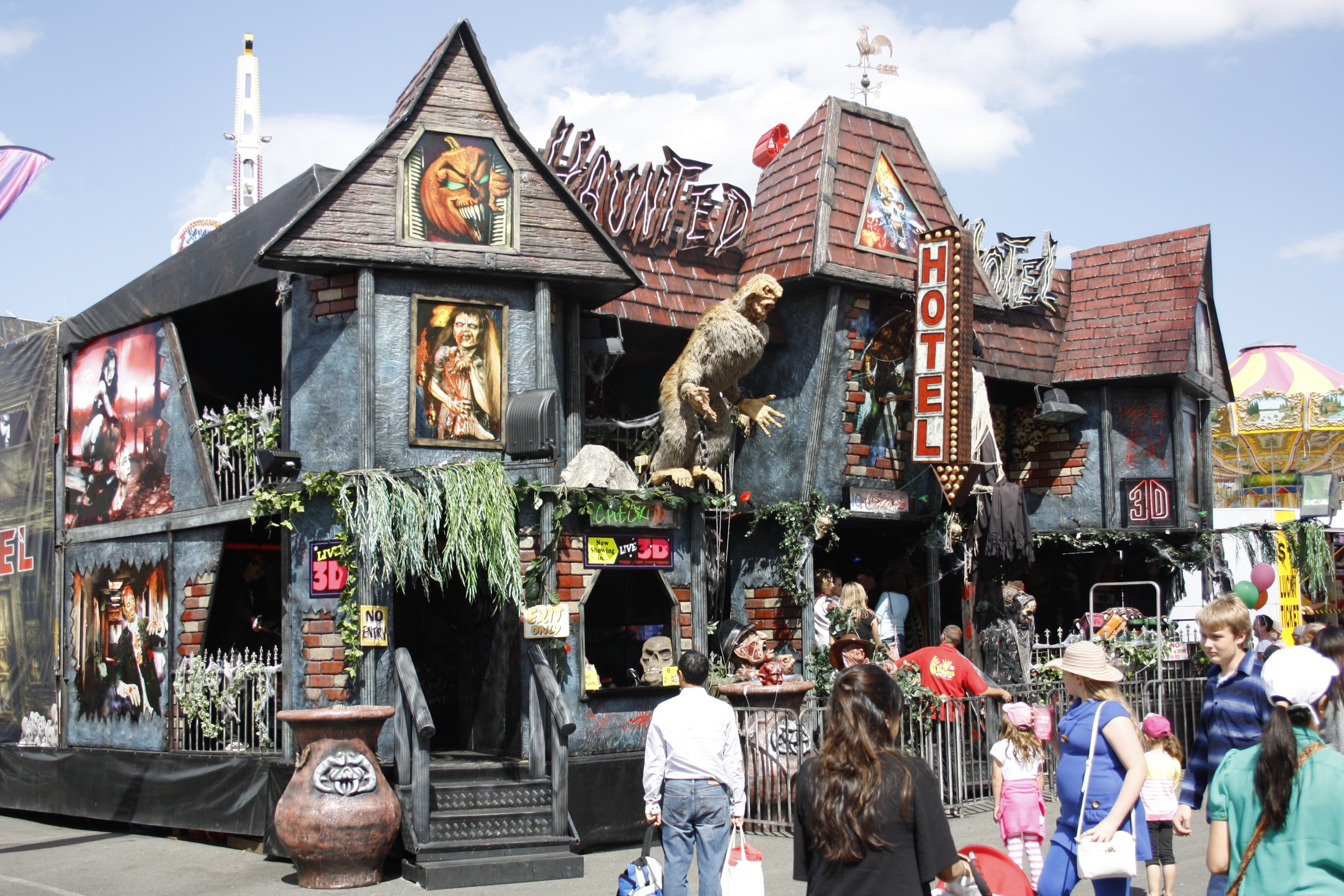
Haunted hotel attraction, Sideshow Alley, 2013

Visitor entry to Sideshow Alley is via the Bowen Park Entry Building or, if within the showgrounds, through two subways beneath the railway line. The part of Sideshow Alley used for rides and other amusements consists of a large expanse of open, level bitumen pavement. Set at regular intervals in the pavement are electrical service boxes used at show time to provide power to the various amusements.

==== Bowen Park Entry Building (interwar) ====
Located in the western corner of the site adjacent to Bowen Park the building is a single-storey structure comprising two smaller elements separated by an access gate. The walls of the buildings are face brick and each has a hipped roof clad with metal custom orb sheeting. Recent additions to these structures appear to include the cement rendering of the brickwork to the Bowen Bridge Street facade and the installation of metal roller doors to the ticket issuing areas.

==== 15. Dairy Cattle Pavilion ====
The Dairy Cattle Pavilion is located at the northern boundary of the showgrounds fronting O'Connell Terrace. It is a timber framed single-storey structure, essentially comprising two rectilinear building masses, which gently follow the slope of the site. A saw tooth roof structure, clad with corrugated iron, covers the full extent of the building. Externally the walls are clad with timber weatherboards while the individual ends to the skillion roof forms are clad with a combination of FC sheeting and timber lattice. A concrete apron surrounds the whole building.

Internally the building is broken up into a series of long narrow bays which follow the line of the saw tooth roof above. The high face of the saw tooth roof form in each bay is clad with timber lattice which allows the interior space to be naturally lit and ventilated. Entry to the pavilion is through chain wire gates located centrally at the end of each bay. In plan, each of bays is very similar in that it consists of a central passage flanked by open cattle pen space on either side and storage accommodation enclosures to each end of the bay. These storage/accommodation enclosures are clad with a combination of FC cladding and timber weatherboards. Walls between the bays are timber framed and clad to half height with the upper portion being finished with timber battens. The floor surface throughout the pavilions is concrete and generally follows the gentle slope of the site.

==== 16. Dairy Goat Pavilion ====
The Dairy Goat Pavilion is located to the south of the Dairy Cattle Pavilion and to the north of Show Ring No.2. It is an elevated two-storey structure with an associated open concrete deck which overlooks the show ring and Sideshow Alley beyond. Storage areas and public amenities are located at the lower ground show ring level under the raised concrete deck while the structure itself is sited at the upper deck level. The building is of a simple rectilinear plan with a gable roof extending the full length of the building and being supported at its ends by concrete and steel columns. Both the walls and roof are clad with metal corrugated custom orb sheeting. Lining the perimeter of the concrete deck are a series of shade structures.

=== Area 4 ===
East of the dairy pavilions and the railway line, in the area to the northeast of the Main Arena and bound by O'Connell Terrace, Brookes Street and Gregory Terrace, are the main livestock facilities. The principal elements of cultural heritage significance in this area include:

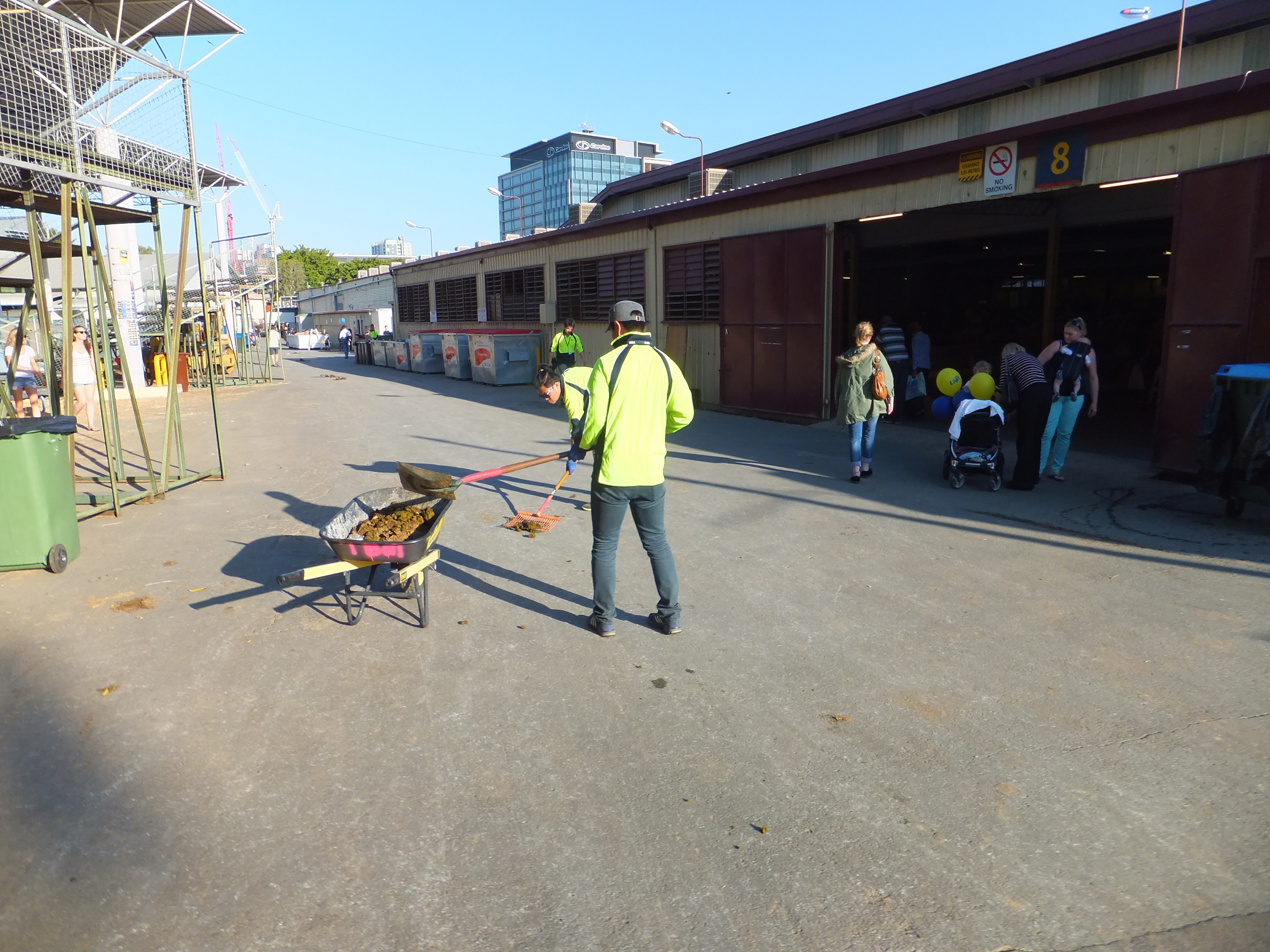
Collecting manure, 2013

==== 17. Beef Cattle Pavilion (1950) ====
This is a large, rectangular, single-storey brick pavilion with sub-floor and a saw-tooth roof, located to the north of the Machinery Hill stands, with the rear wall erected along O'Connell Terrace. The front elevation, which faces south, has a centrally-positioned entrance with steel roller door on the upper level, accessed via a double stair. To either side of the front entrance are banks of hopper windows on both levels. The side and rear walls have less fenestration and there is a large rear entrance (another steel roller door) to O'Connell Terrace.

==== 18. Stock Pavilion ====
The Stock Pavilion is on the eastern side of the Beef Cattle Pavilion. It has a series of skillion roofs set in a saw tooth pattern as the building follows the slope. They are clad with corrugated iron. The walls are weatherboard and the upper section is timber lattice. Doors on eastern side are sheet metal double doors, but two central doors now have steel roller doors.

The area along the wall of the building from the eastern side has a narrow corridor flanked by "lockers" (small rooms with racks). The corridor wall is vertical beaded board, the floors are patched concrete and the outer wall is concrete. The building appears to have been built in two stages, the eastern section has timber trusses and timber frames to the tethering area and looks older than the western end which has steel trusses and partition frames. The tethering area consists of low walls running parallel along the length of the building, equipped with steel rings for tethering animals and hay racks for them above. When the place is occupied, rails are erected to separate each bay and sawdust and sand bedding is put down. Around most of the perimeter of the building are very basic sleeping quarters for people showing their animals at Ekka. There are a few animal pens under the women's sleeping quarters in the western section. These are for cows in calf or with new calves. In the northwest corner of the building is a room for preparing food used by those sleeping in the building. The building has a later brick extension.

==== 19. Stockmans Rest ====
To the south of the Stock Pavilion is a small park known as Stockmans Rest. It has topiaried trees with slat benches around them. (On one of the benches is located a figure of a seated swagman from Expo 88). Two modern telephone booths are situated across from the Stockmens Bar and Grill. There is a small pavilion which appears to be an earlier structure, with later cladding. It has had about a third of the area partitioned off by a wall towards the rear which has metal wall cladding made to look like weatherboard. The park is very popular for weddings and the Stockman's Bar is used for the reception. There is a small pond and fountain behind the pavilion and a plaque commemorating that the area was redeveloped as an initiative of the ground staff in 1994.

==== 20. Exercise Yard ====
In the northeast corner of the site there is an open area which functions as an exercise yard.

==== 21. Horse Stables ====
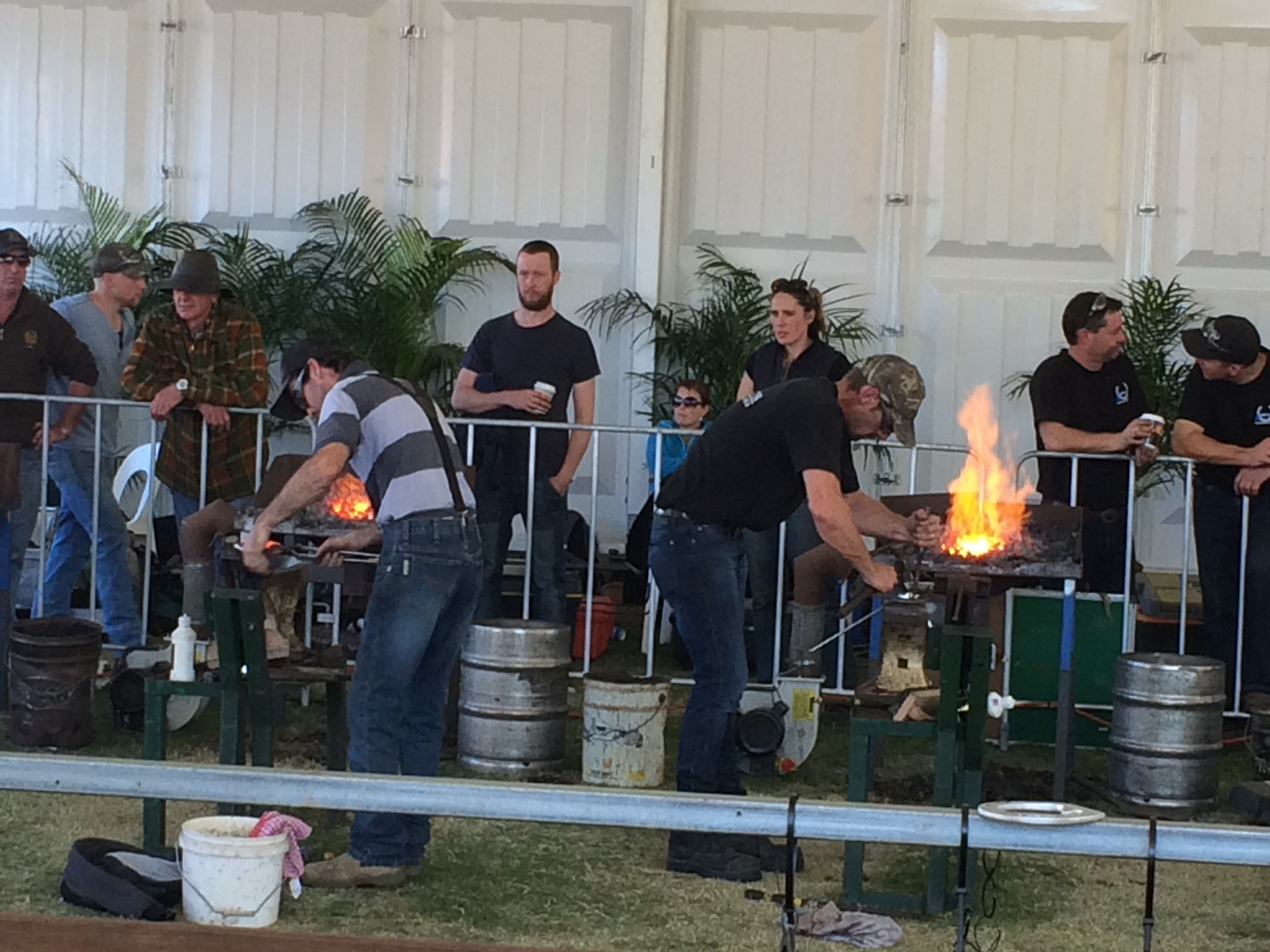
Farrier competition making horseshoes, 2015

Lining the perimeter walls to Brookes Street and Gregory Terrace are horse stables. The stables are in long timber buildings with skillion roofs clad with corrugated iron. The buildings comprise back to back stalls and are arranged with narrow "lanes" between them. The holding capacity must be well over a hundred horses and the individual accommodation is fairly standard – each has a concrete floor, single door and window space filled with a metal grille. The concrete has been roughed up by stamping a rough lattice pattern into it over most areas. There is a horse washing area against the wall where the floor is rough concrete and pebble and the bays are divided by vertical corrugated metal panels.

==== 22. Stock Agents' Offices (1936) ====
The Stock Agents' Offices is a single-storey, rectangular building with sub-floor, constructed in dark brick with stepped parapets. Three sides of the building are freestanding and these each have an entrance. The windows are casements in timber frames on the upper level. Panels of fixed timber louvres at ground level provide light and ventilation to the basement.

The interior has a raised timber floor with a central hall and offices leading off it on both sides. The interiors of these vary in size, finish and layout. Where original ceiling is visible it is A/C and coverstrips. There are several bench seats in silky oak in the hall and the walls have notice boards. The Department of Primary Industries is present at every event where there are animals – this includes dairy and horse shows. Sales agents also have offices at the grounds for the yearling sales.

The sub-floor has toilets and is mainly used for storing the props used for equestrian ring events such as hurdles, poles and jumps. It is known as the "carriage" and has brick walls, a concrete floor and a low ceiling of A/C.

==== 23. Stockmen's Bar and Grill (1936) ====
The Stockmen's Bar and Grill is a brick structure with a saw-tooth roof in three bays which run at right angles to the street. The facade has been painted and the roof is concealed at the front by a very plain stepped brick parapet. In the centre of the front elevation is a large roller door flanked by two similar smaller doors on the left hand side and a standard sized door and a pair of triple projecting windows on the right hand side. These are supported on small brackets and are shaded by sun hoods. A timber veranda has been added to the rear of the building on the upper section and has a wheelchair access ramp. The veranda roof is supported on timber posts and has a timber handrail and dowel balustrade. The wall to the rear of the veranda is clad with weatherboards.

The rear is also accessed through a door at ground level which leads into a large room with concrete floor and brick walls. This leads into a large modern bar opening onto an outdoor area through several large steel roller doors. This area has an auxiliary bar and servery and looks onto Stockman's Rest. It is floored with brick pavers and shaded by a roof of corrugated steel supported on steel trusses. This is lined with a modern timber-look sheeting. The perimeter of this area has sections of heavy post and rails, some of which are decorated with cattle brands. A gateway also formed of heavy posts frame steps leading from the corner of the area down to the street.

==== 24. Lady Forster Building (1928) ====
Located east of the Marshalling Yards is the Lady Forster Building, originally a creche erected in 1928 in Costin Street and moved in 1939 to its present position. It is a rectangular, high-set, timber framed, gable-roofed building with transverse gables at the southeast end. The roof is clad with corrugated iron and the exterior walls with fibrous-cement sheeting, cover-strips and weatherboards. There is a row of timber hopper windows high in the southwest, northwest and southeast walls. Because of the slope of the land, the northeast side of the building is at ground level and has a number of sliding aluminium doors and a skillion-roofed extension over cement paving. There is a small yard to the northeast of the building, with three mature Moreton Bay fig trees shading the whole of the yard. The sub-floor has been in-filled with brick and contains male and female toilets and a small electricity sub-station.

The interior is lined with fibrous-cement sheeting and molded cover strips and is divided into numerous small rooms by fibrous-cement or later ply-wood sheeted partitions, only some of which are to full height. Some of these small rooms have early tongue-and-groove "stable" doors. The floor at the northwest end is of concrete and is higher than the timber floor of the southeast end of the building – probably to accommodate the men's toilets below.

==== Toilet block ====
There is a c. 1930s toilet block between the gate to O'Connell Terrace and the Stock Pavilion. It is constructed of brick and concrete and has a rough stucco finish in places. The roof is gabled and is clad with corrugated iron. There are square panels of fixed timber louvres in pairs under the eaves (similar to the louvred panels set at ground level in the Stock Agents' Offices).

Other structures in Area 4 include:

- 25. Affleck House (not the 1918 building) – a two-storey, light-coloured brick building adjacent to the railway line, housing a cafe at the southwest end
- Brick toilet block attached to the southwest end of Affleck House
- Railway platforms southwest of Affleck House and toilets

=== Area 5 ===
A large number of pavilions are located to the southeast of Gregory Terrace. The principal elements of cultural heritage significance in the area bounded by Gregory Terrace, Exhibition Street, St Paul's Terrace and Alexandria Street include:

==== 26 & 27. The Avenues 8–11 ====
These buildings together create a long rectangular exhibition pavilion extending between Gregory and St Paul's Terraces, with the front elevation to Alexandria Street. It is a single-storey structure comprising adjoined buildings from different periods and constructed from different materials. All the buildings are connected internally, allowing free passage through the length of the structure.

The entrances to each building are from Alexandria Street. The entrances to Buildings Nos.8–10 have a constructed gabled portico with signage identifying the building. The entrance to Building No.11 is slightly obscured behind a constructed restaurant that extends from the front of the building towards Alexandria Street

The building closest to Gregory Terrace is referred to as "No.8 The Avenue." Its frontage to Gregory Terrace consists of a face brick wall with rectangular casements of narrow metal louvre ventilators and a large central steel roller door providing access from the street. The gabled roof structure is visible from Gregory Terrace. The gable nearest Alexandria Street is of a different design to the two gables at the rear and possibly constitutes the earliest part of the building, the outer part being an addition. The earliest part of the building most probably dates from the late 1920s. There is evidence of this earlier smaller timber structure in the timber wall separating buildings Nos.8 and 9 that only extends across half the breadth of the current interior space. The rear of this building is clad with metal sheeting with the same casements of narrow metal louvres. The interior is a large space with numerous supporting posts and exposed roof trusses. There are entrances from the rear, the side and front and a through way in the dividing wall between this building and the adjacent Building No.9. Building No.8 is wider than the other buildings.

Buildings No. 9 and 10 are of the same construction and compose the midsection of the entire structure. The commencement of Building No.9 is evidenced by the stepped-back join between it and Building No.8. Buildings No. 9 and 10 are clad in weatherboard with a front and rear entrance to each. At the rear of these buildings is a weatherboard toilet structure. Internally the buildings are divided by a wall with a large opening for through passage.

Building No.11 is another weatherboard structure. It was most likely built after the two adjoining buildings to fit into the prescribed space.

==== 28. Show Camp Building (c. 1940s?) ====
This building is located adjacent to Expo Place along Exhibition Street and is used for dormitory style accommodation for rural school children. It is a single-storey, "L-shaped" timber building, high-set on square concrete pillars, with an enclosed undercroft. The building has a corrugated iron gabled roof with a projecting gable at the northwest end. The exterior is clad in weatherboard with no verandas. The front elevation displays symmetrically spaced, small, rectangular window openings with glass louvres and a centrally placed door accessed by a set of stairs. There is another stair at the southeast end of the building and another to the transverse wing at the northwest end. The undercroft has been enclosed to accommodate male and female toilets, a bathroom and several other rooms. The interior of the upper floor is lined with fibrous cement sheeting and is divided by partitions into three main sections as well as smaller sections within these for adult accommodation.

==== 29.Expo Place Pavilions (1988 & later) ====
Expo Place is a large exhibition space sheltered by two late 20th century, open-air pavilions. It is bound by Gregory Terrace to the west, Exhibition Street to the north, the Show Camp Building to the east and the pavilion referred to as "The Avenues No.8 " to the south. A set of gates provide access to this area from Gregory Terrace and there are three mature fig trees on the northern side of these gates, on the footpath.

The northernmost structure was constructed in honour of "World Expo 88." It is a steel-framed structure with two roof sections; one stepped back from the other forming an 'L'-shape. The roof is supported by cylindrical reinforced concrete pillars with space-frames and triangulated steel trusses. There is no ground cover underneath the shelter and there are no walls.

On the eastern side of the 1988 structure is a later steel-framed structure with a multi-gabled, corrugated iron roof. There is one long, rectangular gable roof along the length of the structure, at the rear, with four gable roofs at the front, at right-angles to the main roof. These four interconnected structures are staggered in length creating a tiered effect along the front elevation.

The structure is supported on cylindrical reinforced concrete pillars. The gabled roof and corrugated iron awnings run the lengths and breadths of the shelter. There is a gallery at the rear, accessed by a set of stairs on the eastern side. The ground is covered in bitumen.

=== Area 6 ===
The principal elements of cultural heritage significance in the area bound by Gregory Terrace, Alexandria Street, St Paul's Terrace and the Main Arena include:

==== 30. John Reid Pavilion ====
This pavilion was erected in 1904 in Toowoomba and moved to Showgrounds in 1917.

The John Reid Pavilion consists internally of a large central space with a gable roof, surrounded on three sides by subsidiary aisles under a lower skillion roof. The main roof has iron roof trusses with a small gable-roof central clerestory. The clerestory windows have been covered and clear roof panels have been inserted into the main roof and aisle roof. Louvres have been added to the wall between the aisle roof and the main roof. Iron columns, stamped with the words "Toowoomba foundry", divide the main space from the aisles. The wall to Alexandria Street is constructed of timber with loading docks accessible from the street. The other side wall of brick, with openings that have been filled in, abuts the Dairy Industry Hall. A steel framed awning has been added to the Gregory Terrace facade.

The John Reid Pavilion forms part of a complex of buildings, which have been joined over time. These buildings include the John Reid Annexe, the Sugar Hall, and Building No.7. These pavilions have been sited so that the public can move freely from one to another. The adjacent Dairy Industry Hall also forms part of the complex, but has been designed as a separate entity and is inaccessible from the other pavilions. The TAB building is situated at the front of the John Reid Pavilion and is also utilised as a separate structure.

==== 30A. John Reid Annexe (by 1925) ====
The John Reid Annexe is situated directly behind the John Reid Pavilion with the ridge of the Annexe roof at 90 degrees to the main ridge of the John Reid Pavilion. The Annexe is of single-skin timber construction, clad externally with chamferboards, with horizontal boarding on some interior walls. It has a corrugated iron gable roof supported by hardwood timber trusses. The Annexe can be accessed at both ends via steel roller doors and the doors lead through to the John Reid Pavilion to the northwest and Building No.7 to the southeast.

==== 31. Dairy Industry Hall (1950s) ====
The Dairy Industry Hall is a long, narrow, two-storey building constructed along the southwest side of the John Reid Pavilion. The facade to Gregory Terrace is of face brick with the words "Dairy Industry Hall" in steel lettering. The most noticeable features of the building include the zigzag roof structure and glazed south wall. The building consists of three solid walls with the remaining long side-wall completely glazed to allow southern light to flood the internal spaces. This glazed wall is protected by the roof extending to form an arcade along the side. The structural system of the building is expressed, with the concrete structural beams and columns painted externally and in-filled with panels of face brick. The steel roof beams are exposed on the upper floor ceiling.

The ground floor consists of one open space with access provided by a series of recent aluminium-framed doors with fixed glass panels in between. Stairs lead up to the first floor at each end of the building. These stairs incorporate heavy timber treads and fine steel sections, which run vertically from floor to ceiling and act as a screen and a support for the balustrade. The end of one of the staircases is expressed to form a decorative zigzag pattern. The first floor ceiling lining follows the zigzag line of the roof, exposing the steel roof structure. This floor contains the original steel framed hopper windows and fixed glass panels along the south wall. The flooring is of mixed hardwood. An elevated link joins this building to the neighbouring Commerce Building and Meat Hall.

==== 32. Sugar Hall ====
The Sugar Hall is located between the Dairy Industry Hall and the John Reid Pavilion Annexe. It is a small timber-framed building with a rendered masonry facade. A roller door joins this building to the John Reid Annexe.

==== 33. Building No.7 ====
Building No.7 is a larger pavilion which runs parallel to the John Reid Annexe. It is also of single-skin timber construction with chamferboard cladding. The southern side wall has diagonal timber lattice at the top, which has been covered in fibrous-cement sheeting. Some internal walls have horizontal boarding. The gable roof is corrugated iron supported on hardwood rafters. A single line of square timber columns runs down the centre of the building. It has an early roof construction.

At the rear of the John Reid Pavilion complex, to the east along Alexandria Street, is the RNA Workshop (Bdg No.43) with an early brick toilet block (Bdg No.43A) situated at the front.

==== 34. RNA Workshop ====
The earliest sections of the RNA Workshop may date back to 1925. This building operates as a workshop and is used to store supplies and machinery. It is a combination of three buildings, with the largest single-storey building at the rear of the complex with two smaller single-storey, gable roof buildings set at 90 degrees to it at the front. The front facades of the two smaller buildings are clad in weatherboards, with the side and rear walls of all buildings clad in corrugated iron. Mezzanines have been inserted in parts of the building and there have been many changes to most internal areas.

==== 34A. Brick toilet block ====
This is one of a series of brick toilet blocks located throughout the site thought to be built between World War I and World War II. It has been refurbished, extended to the rear and none of the original fittings remain. The female toilets are housed partly in a concrete block extension and the male toilets are located in the original low-set brick building. The original part of the building contains glazed face-brick walls with feature panels of roughcast render. Set symmetrically above the rendered panels are fixed timber louvres for ventilation. The roof is hipped, clad in short sheets of corrugated iron. Screen walls of concrete block and ribbed steel, with a skillion roof above, have been added to the front of the building.

==== 35. Gregory Rest and Gregory Terrace Fig Trees ====
Addressing Gregory Terrace is Gregory Rest, a grassed area shaded by three large weeping fig trees which have been trimmed to a formal shape. This area also contains the School Band Stand, a modern steel structure with twin semi-circular roofs. The fig trees and the continued use of this site for school band performances are significant.

Other structures in Area 6 include:

- 36. Commerce Building and Meat Hall – a two-storey concrete building with a twin gable roof
- 37. Building No.4 – a pavilion open on two sides to the street, with a steel framed roof supported on brick piers and enclosed by brick walls on two sides
- 38. Building No.6 – a recent concrete block structure with a flat roof
- 39. Frank Roberston Pavilion – a recent concrete block building with twin barrel-vaulted roof (demolished c. 2010 in the redevelopment project.)
- 40. TAB Building (c. 1970s) – a small, single-storey concrete building constructed in the Brutalist style, located at the front of the John Reid Pavilion on Gregory Terrace
- 41. Royal Snack Bar – a food outlet, located at the side of the Information Technology Building
- 42. Main Parade Food Stall and 51 Show Time Snack Bar – simple brick and concrete block buildings with serving counters addressing the street (demolished c. 2010 as part of the redevelopment project)
- 43. Agricultural Street Bar – a c. 1950s brick wall and toilet block with a bar and steel shade structure (demolished c. 2010 as part of the redevelopment project)
- 44. Machinery Street Fish Place – a c. 1970s brick snack bar (demolished c. 2010 as part of the redevelopment project)
- 45. Industry Street Food Bar – a fibrous-cement clad addition at the rear of Building No.7
- 46. Police Exhibit – a flat-roof concrete block building located at the end of Main Parade (demolished c. 2010 as part of the redevelopment project)

=== Area 7 ===
The principal elements of cultural heritage significance in the area between Costin Street and Main Parade, to the south of Gregory Terrace, include:

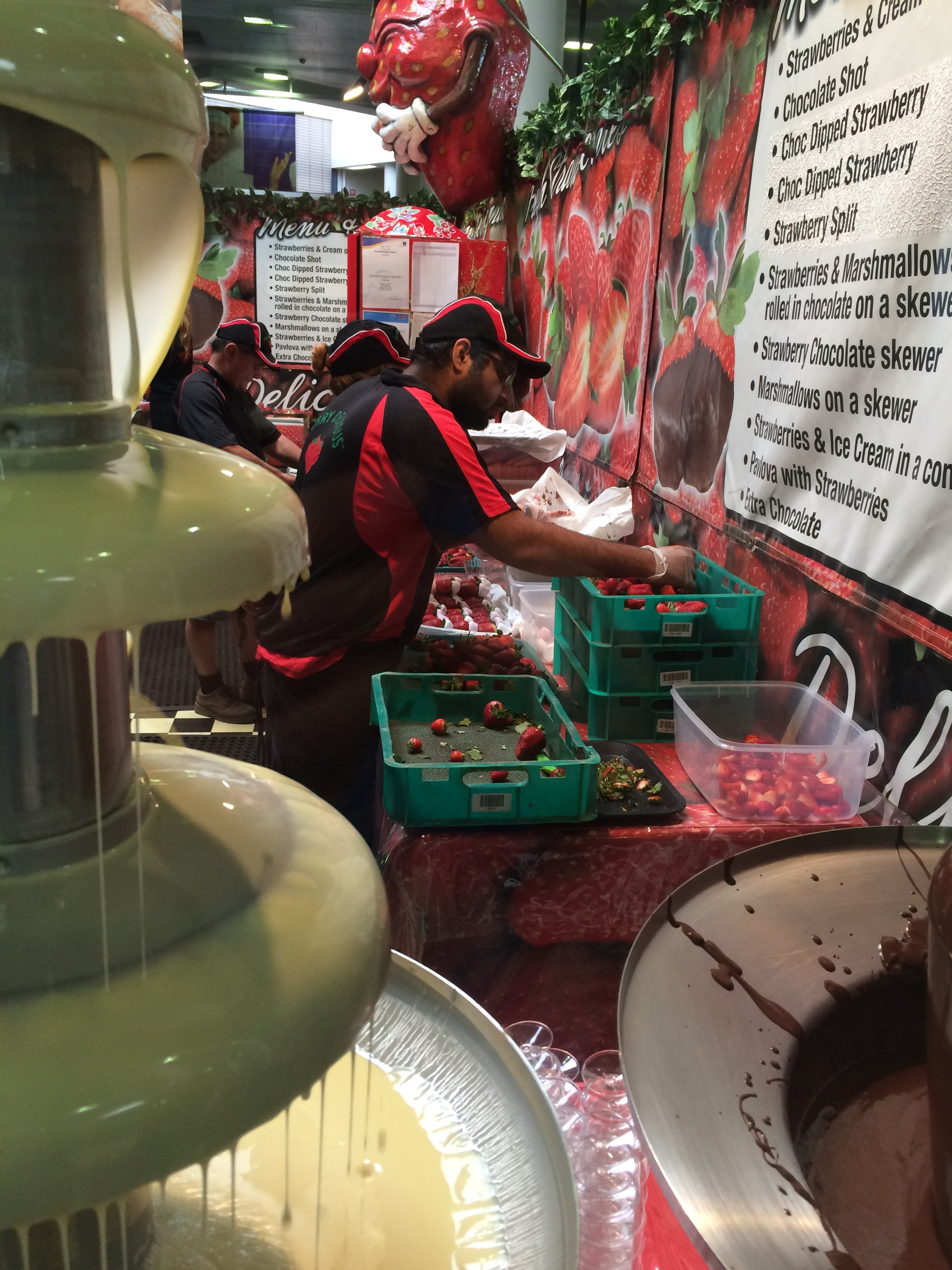
Queensland foods exhibits in the Exhibition building, 2015

==== 47. Exhibition Building (1986) ====
The Exhibition Building is a two-storey, concrete block building, with steel framed windows with large panes of glass. The main entrance is located at the corner of Gregory Terrace and Costin Street. The ground floor is a large, open space with concrete floors and concrete piers supporting the concrete floor above. The first floor has a two-storey volume space and numerous skylights. The building has a suspended ceiling which houses a ducted air-conditioning system.

==== 48. Walter Burnett Building and Auditorium (1988) ====
The Walter Burnett building was a two-storey brick and concrete structure with first floor access to the adjacent Frank Nicklin Pavilion. The building had a concrete ramp and concrete stairway accessing the first floor. A large entry foyer with floor to ceiling windows was located at the front of the building with three hallways leading to the auditorium located at the rear of the building towards Costin Street. The ground floor comprised a large, open space with concrete floor and concrete pillars, with floor to wall windows located along the southern and eastern sides of the building. The building was demolished c. 2010 as part of the redevelopment project.

==== 49. Frank Nicklin Pavilion ====
The Frank Nickin Pavilion was a two-storey brick building located adjacent to the Walter Burnett Building, the latter accessible from the first floor of the Frank Nicklin Pavilion. On the upper level, the building had horizontal fenestration along the eastern elevation and vertical fenestration along the southern elevation. The building was demolished c. 2010 as part of the redevelopment project.

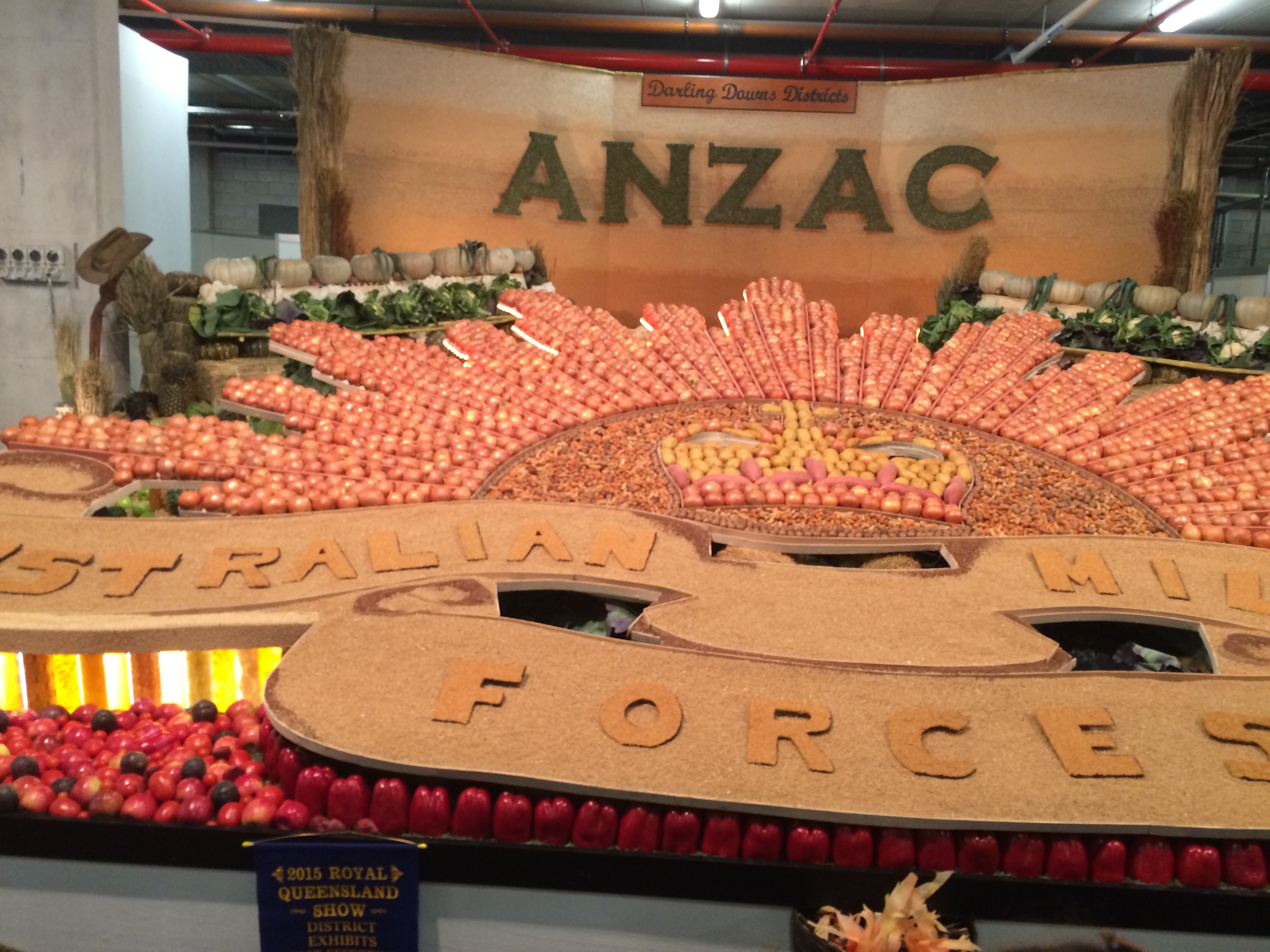
ANZAC centenary commemorative display of fruit and vegetables from the Darling Downs, 2015

==== 50. Agricultural Hall and 39. Douglas Wadley Pavilion ====
These buildings were built in 1963 with further 1968 & 1977 extensions to the Douglas Wadley Pavilion.

The original section of the Agricultural Hall and Douglas Wadley Pavilion was a low-pitched, double-gabled steel-framed structure clad with corrugated, galvanized iron. The words "AGRICULTURAL HALL" AND "DOUGLAS WADLEY DOG PAVILION" were located on the eastern elevation. Internally, the Agricultural Hall section comprised a two-storey volume space with a concrete floor and a steel-trussed ceiling. The 1968 extensions included the addition of a two-storey brick and steel-framed section with a concrete floor and concrete pillars. The large, open space had seating located around the main show area. Stalls for the animals were located on the ground and first floors. The 1977 addition was a two-storey brick section. Part of this addition was the "Henry Phillips Council Room" located on the first floor of the brick addition. These buildings were demolished c. 2010 as part of the redevelopment project.

=== Area 8 ===
This consists of the railway corridor through the Showgrounds. The principal elements of cultural heritage significance in Area 8 include:

- the Railway Corridor – which dates to 1881
- the stone cuttings on the northwest side of the line, near Sideshow Alley
- the bridge/sub-way giving access from the John MacDonald Stand to Show Ring No.2 and associated masonry viaduct.

== Heritage listing ==
Brisbane Showgrounds was listed on the Queensland Heritage Register on 25 July 2003 having satisfied the following criteria.

The place is important in demonstrating the evolution or pattern of Queensland's history.

In use as a showground since 1876, the Brisbane Showgrounds is significant for its long association with the Royal National Agricultural and Industrial Association of Queensland (RNA) and has been important in furthering the expansion and development of agriculture and industry in Queensland since the 1870s. From the first Exhibition held in 1876, the objective has been to showcase the full range of Queensland's agricultural, horticultural, pastoral and industrial resources.

The place is important in demonstrating the principal characteristics of a particular class of cultural places.

The Brisbane Showgrounds is important as an example of a large operating exhibition ground in a capital city and as Queensland's premier showgrounds. There is a dynamic to the place, the form and composition of which has been evolving since its inception. The principal elements of cultural heritage significance include: the spatial arrangement of buildings, structures, streets and green spaces; the two show rings; the grandstands including the John McDonald Stand, Ernest Baynes Stand, Council Stand, Members' Stand, Machinery Hill stands and Marshalling Yards Stand; interwar infrastructure such as toilet blocks, entrance gates, turnstiles, railway subway and perimeter walling; Sideshow Alley; the pavilions including the John Reid Pavilion, Industrial Pavilion and Dairy Industry Hall; buildings such as the Stock Agents' Office and Stockmen's Bar and Grill, the former Commonwealth Bank Building and the Gregory Terrace Entry Building; the numerous cattle, horse, dairy and pig pavilions and stabling and marshalling areas; and the shade trees (mainly mature weeping fig trees (Ficus benjamina)) scattered throughout the grounds.

Buildings/structures important in illustrating the principal characteristics of their type include the John MacDonald Stand (1906, architect Claude William Chambers); the Industrial Pavilion (1938–39, architect Richard Gailey jnr); the Dairy Industry Hall (1950s); and the interwar turnstiles, entry gates and toilet blocks.

The place is important because of its aesthetic significance.

The Industrial Pavilion and the John MacDonald Stand are important also for their aesthetic contribution to the site and landmark and/or streetscape value. The two show rings and their surrounds also have aesthetic value.

The place has a strong or special association with a particular community or cultural group for social, cultural or spiritual reasons.

The place has strong social significance for the generations of Queenslanders who have attended the annual exhibition, affectionately known as the "Ekka" and the many other events that have taken place at the Showgrounds. Sideshow Alley in particular has strong social significance.

The place has a special association with the life or work of a particular person, group or organisation of importance in Queensland's history.

In use as a showground since 1876, the Brisbane Showgrounds is significant for its long association with the Royal National Agricultural and Industrial Association of Queensland (RNA) and has been important in furthering the expansion and development of agriculture and industry in Queensland since the 1870s. From the first Exhibition held in 1876, the objective has been to showcase the full range of Queensland's agricultural, horticultural, pastoral and industrial resources.

== International centuries ==
=== Test cricket ===
The following table summarises the Test centuries scored at Brisbane Exhibition Ground.

No.	Score	Player	Team	Balls	Inns.	Opposing team	Date	Result
1	169	Patsy Hendren	England	314	1	Australia	30 November 1928	Won
2	109	Bill Ponsford	Australia	NA	1	West Indies	16 January 1931	Won
3	223	Don Bradman	Australia	NA	1	West Indies	16 January 1931	Won
4	102*	George Headley	West Indies	NA	1	Australia	16 January 1931	Lost

== List of five-wicket hauls ==
Six five-wicket hauls were taken in the three Test matches played on the ground.

Five-wicket hauls in Men's Test matches at Brisbane Exhibition Ground
No.	Bowler	Date	Team	Opposing Team	Inn	O	R	W	Result
1	Harold Larwood	30 November 1928	England	Australia	2	14.4	32	6	England won
2	Clarrie Grimmett	30 November 1928	Australia	England	3	44.1	131	6	England won
3	Clarrie Grimmett	16 January 1931	Australia	West Indies	3	14.3	49	5	Australia won

Five-wicket hauls in Women's Test matches at Brisbane Exhibition Ground
No.	Bowler	Date	Team	Opposing Team	Inn	O	R	W	Result
1	Myrtle Maclagan (Note: This was the first women's Test match to be played. As a result, Maclagen, Palmer and Spear were all making their Test match debuts.)	28 December 1934	England	Australia	1	17	10	7	England won
2	Anne Palmer	28 December 1934	Australia	England	2	13.2	18	7	England won
3	Mary Spear	28 December 1934	England	Australia	3	34	15	5	England won

== Rugby League Test matches ==
The Exhibition Ground hosted 10 rugby league test matches from 1908 to 1960.

Game#	Date	Result	Attendance	Notes
1	30 May 1908	New Zealand def. Australia 24–12	6,000	1908 Trans-Tasman Test series
2	26 June 1909	Australia def. New Zealand 10–5	6,000	1909 Trans-Tasman Test series
3	2 July 1910	(United Kingdom) Northern Union def. Australia 22–17	18,000	1910 Ashes series
4	26 June 1920	Australia def. (United Kingdom) Northern Union 8–4	32,000	1920 Ashes series
5	12 July 1924	Australia def. (United Kingdom) The Lions 21–11	39,000	1924 Ashes series
6	23 June 1928	(United Kingdom) The Lions def. Australia 15–12	39,300	1928 Ashes series
7	6 July 1946	(United Kingdom) The Lions def. Australia 14–5	40,500	1946 Ashes series
8	5 July 1958	Great Britain def. Australia 25–18	33,563	1958 Ashes series
9	27 June 1959	Australia def. New Zealand 38–10	30,994	1959 Trans-Tasman Test series
10	27 June 1960	Australia def. France 56–6	32,644	1960 Australia vs France Test series

== See also ==
- List of Test cricket grounds
