= Australian rules football in Papua New Guinea =

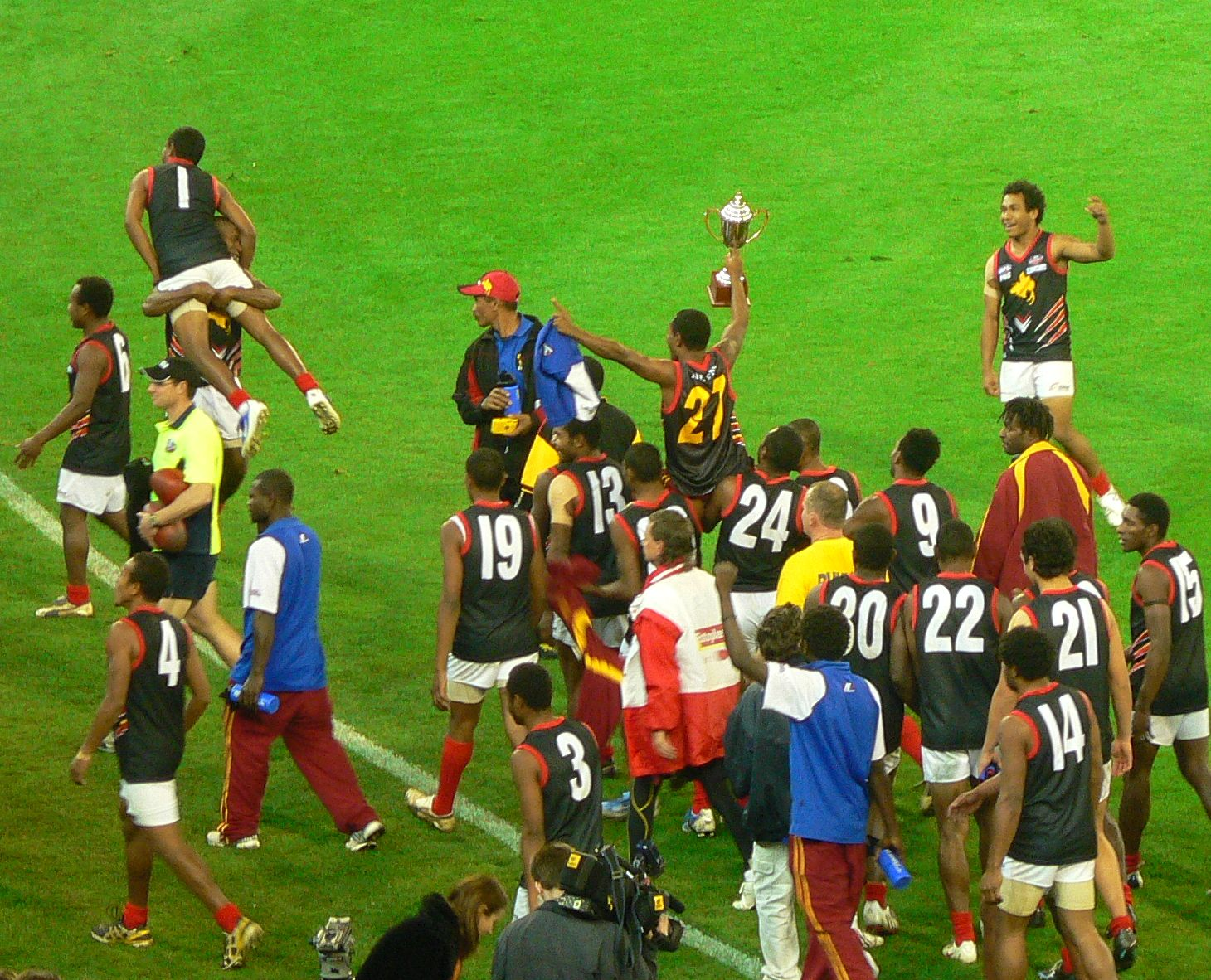
- Papua New Guinea's Mosquitos celebrate taking the International Cup from New Zealand to become International champions in 2008.
- Country: Papua New Guinea
- Governing body: PNG Rules Football Council
- National team: Papua New Guinea
- First played: 1943, Port Moresby
- Registered players: 1,920 (adult) 45,000 (junior)

Club competitions
- Goroka Football League; Kimbe Football League; Lae Football League; Mt Hagen Football League; Port Moresby Football League; Rabaul Football League; Eastern Highlands Rules Football League

Audience records
- Single match: 10,000 (1976) PNG vs Nauru Sir Hubert Murray Stadium, Port Moresby

In Papua New Guinea (PNG), Australian rules football (typically referred to as "rules", "rules football", "footy", or less commonly "Aussie rules", "AFL rules", "AFL", or "football") is a developing team sport which was initially introduced by Australian servicemen during World War II. The governing body for the sport is the PNG Rules Football Council, with the development body being AFL PNG. The junior development version is known locally as Niukick. Regionally, AFL PNG is affiliated with AFL South Pacific with an Australian development pathway through AFL Queensland.

It is home to the longest running league outside Australia, the Port Moresby Australian Rules Football League (or POM AFL), founded in 1955. Prior to independence from Australia the sport boomed in the 1960s and 70s, Rules was a major spectator and participation sport and the standard of representatives sides from PNG reached a level close to that of the semi-professional leagues in Australia. PNG proved to be highly competitive against VFL clubs and internationally against Australia, Indigenous Australia and Nauru. The national team's first full international match against Nauru attracted 10,000 to Sir Hubert Murray Stadium in Port Moresby which remains the world record for an international representative match in the sport. This golden age ended abruptly in 1981 after a failed restructuring of football operations by Australian interests, poor junior performance in the Teal Cup and the withdrawal of funding causing a total collapse of the sport. This resulted in other codes of football particularly Rugby League and soccer rapidly outgrowing it. Nevertheless, Rules has seen a major revival since the 1990s.

The national team is the most decorated in international Australian Football, having won more International titles (3 - 2008, 2014, 2017) than any other nation, in addition, it has won silver medals in 2002, 2005, 2011 and three gold at the Arafura Games. The PNG Muruks, the country's only AFL Asia affiliated club, winning four straight Asian Australian Football Championships between 2019 and 2024. The senior men's team also took out the inaugural AFL Pacific Cup in 2024.

Players of Papua New Guinean heritage have played professionally in the Australian Football League, the most famous of which is "king" Mal Michael who holds the AFL games and goals record for a Papuan born player. More recently, a pathway from AFL PNG to the AFL, mainly through AFL Queensland has been established providing a source of talent for clubs in Australia. The pathway resulted in Hewago Oea, in 2022, becoming the first Papuan to debut in the AFL who learned to play the game locally.

In the media, the sport is covered by The National and Papua New Guinea Post-Courier and EMTV.

== History ==
=== Beginnings ===
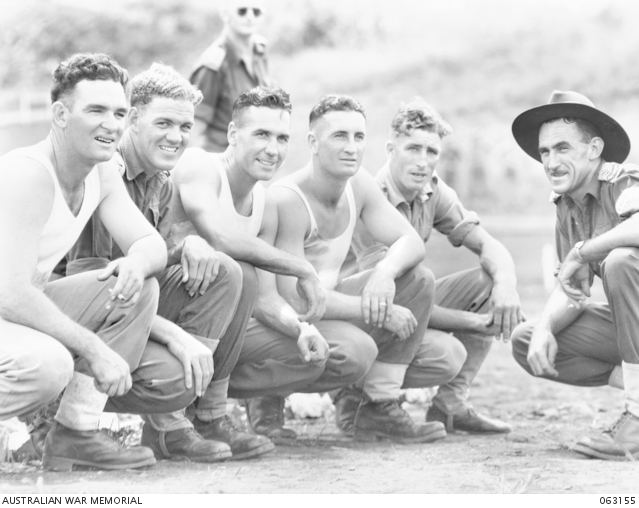
Big name Australian rules players from the 15th Brigade stationed in New Guinea in January, 1944 including LCpl James Patrick "Shane" McGrath (VFL Melbourne); Lt John Huggett "Jack" Pimm (VFL Collingwood);Kenneth Onley (VFA Port Melbourne); LCpl Richard David Hingston (VFL Melbourne) and Cpl Ronald Walter Leishman (VFA Brunswick)

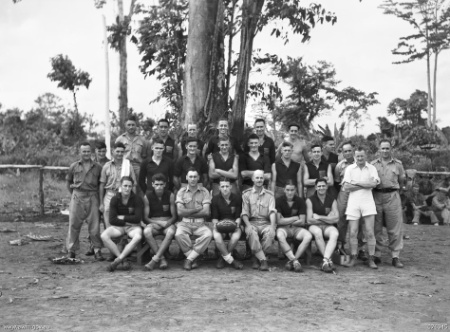
One of the Australian personnel teams (22nd works company) credited with introducing the sport to Lae, New Guinea in early 1944

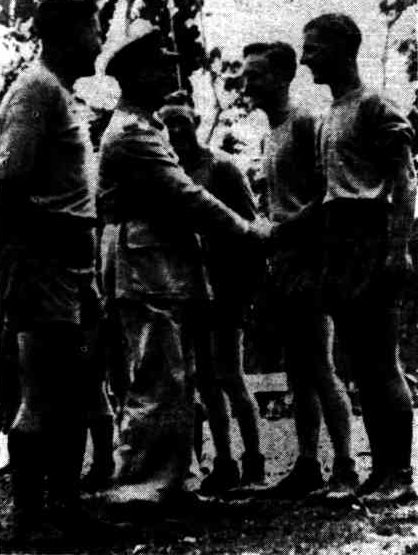
Australian Army officials meet with Australian rules football players before a match at Bougainville in 1945

There was awareness of the sport early in the 20th Century, with mentions of it in the media dating back to the 1920s, including reports on the QAFL, NSWAFL, NTFL and VFL from the 1940s however it was not played locally.

In May 1943, serving in the Territory of Papua during the New Guinea campaign began an informal league which were among the earliest recorded matches in Papua New Guinea. The league consisted of teams including Konedobu, Wirraways, Razorback, Strafers, Wallabies, Pioneers, Bower Birds, Ack-Redians, John's Gully. On 29 April 1943, an RAAF team held a secret training session. Its first match was held that weekend on the 1st May. Another higher profile match was held on the 5 May 1943 featuring several notable Australian players. On Saturday 22 May 1943, RAAF Wirraways 13-10 defeated Razorback 9–8. On the 30 May 1943, John's Gully RAAF Australian Rules football team against a Waigani Road team at the Gully Oval, the RAAF Wirraway Australian Rules football team also called for opponents. Other teams included Regiment and Con. Depot.

In the Territory of New Guinea, one of the earliest recorded matches was held in the capital Lae and the inland town of Nagada in 1944 by Australian school teachers and defence force personnel.

In November 1945, a match was played between Victoria and "The Rest" at Torokina, Bougainville.

A competition was played in Rabaul, New Britain in 1946 between servicemen, including the 29th/46th Battalion – a Militia unit that had been recruited mostly in the eastern suburbs of Melbourne – played several matches against sides from New Guinea and New Britain. The HMAS Arunta Australian rules football team also played matches on Rabaul against Flotilla.

The Port Moresby Australian Rules Football League began in Port Moresby in 1955, quickly becoming the most prominent competition in Papua.

In 1956, Papua's first representative side was assembled, defeating regional representative sides from both Cairns and Innisfail in Far North Queensland.

=== 1960s: Rules Booms ===
The game was seldom played until regular matches were played in Papua between Australians at Boroko Rugby League Oval, Port Moresby in 1961. Matches were also played in Lae. Rules was a relatively new sport in Papua, where rugby league had a significant head start. However, there were numerous Victorians, including many from the Warrnambool district working in Moresby at the time, enough to kickstart the 8 team competition.

One of the first schools to take up the game was Sogeri Secondary College in the Central Province which was founded by the Australian Defence Force. The school team was known as the Magpies and wore the colours of the Collingwood Football Club In 1963 it would become the first side composed primarily of Papuans to win a Port Moresby senior premiership and would go on to be the country's strongest school in the sport, producing many great footballers for the senior competition. In the same year, the sport was spreading in the Western Highlands Province and East Sepik Province with Wewak hosting its first representative match against Mount Hagen.

The Cleland Medal was first awarded to the league's player. The 1964 winner was local grown player Herea Amini, of Sogeri College, who was rewarded with a flight to Melbourne to play for 2 weeks with the VFL's Demons. Amini returned from Melbourne to found the Koboni Football Club, adopting the colours and moniker of the Melbourne Football Club in 1965, and Koboni Demons remain Papua New Guinea's longest running club.

There was an annual football carnival between Papua, New Guinea and the New Guinea Islands. In 1967 it was held in Rabaul and in 1968 it was hosted by Lae.

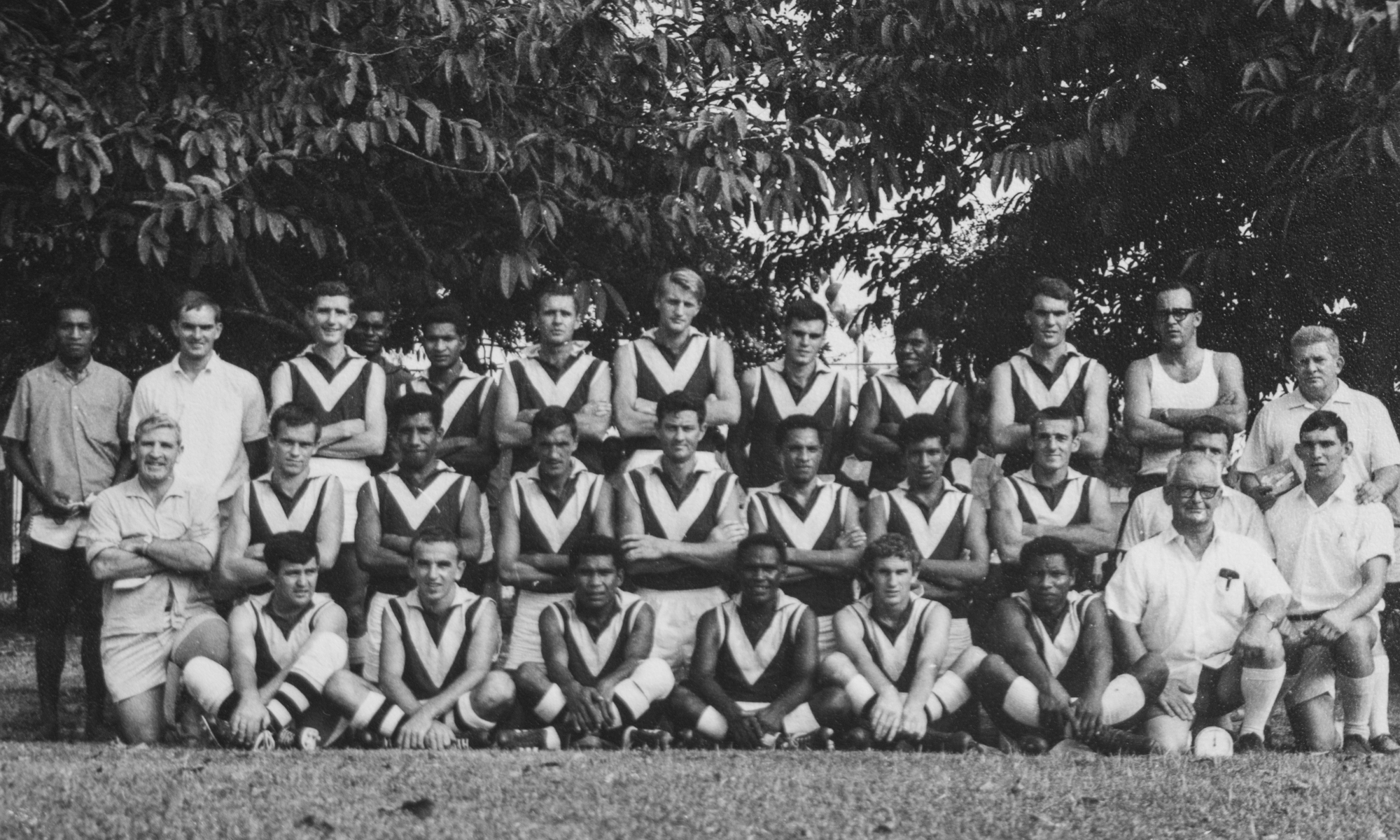
Papua Australia Rules team 1967 in the football carnival in Rabaul between Papua, New Guinea and the New Guinea Islands.

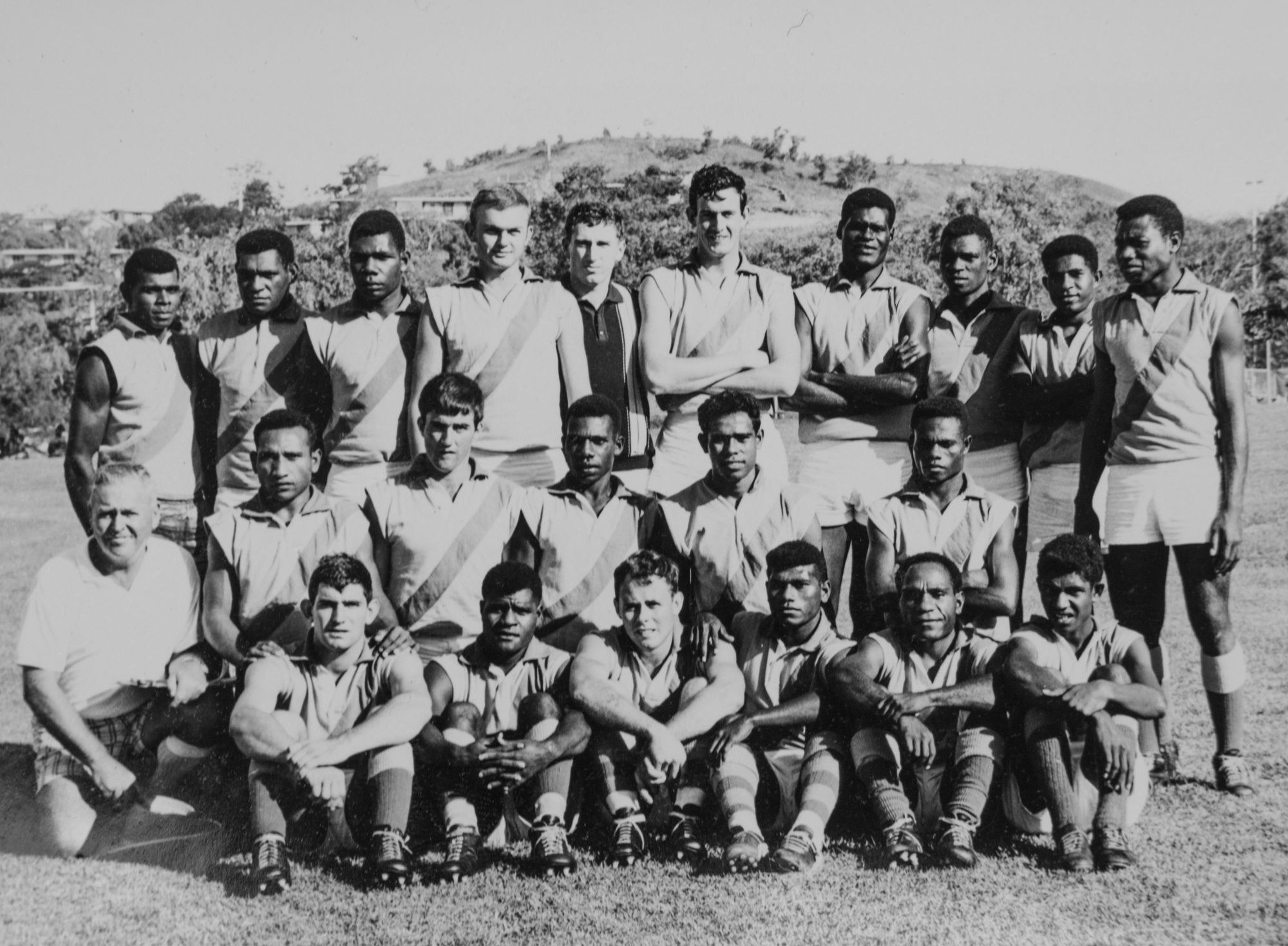
Army Australia Rules Team Port Moresby 1968. Members of the team were from Murray and Taurama Barracks

In 1969 Papua New Guinea sent its first touring side to compete against the Mount Isa league in Queensland for a "North of Australia Championship", played three games and won two of them.

In 1969 on 8 October a touring St Kilda football team from the Victorian Football League (VFL) coached by Allan Jeans visited Port Moresby defeated a composite national PNG team at the South Pacific Oval 9-17-61 to 1-6-12 It was the first time the new Hubert Murray Stadium was used for Australian Rules, and was played under lights in front of a large crowd.

VFL great Ted Whitten, excited about the growth of the game in the highlands visited Madang; Mount Hagen; Goroka; Wewak, and Kieta in November of that year, showing locals video footage from the Richmond vs Carlton VFL Grand Final. A combined Gold Coast side toured PNG winning by a point.

Extensive growth was seen in 1970 with a new 4 team league in New Ireland established. In Morobe and the Eastern highlands in 1971 the game was booming, with the Lae league expanding to 13 teams and the Goroka league expanding in 1971 to 8 clubs.

In 1972, organised by Brian Fry, schoolboy competition began, helping boost junior player numbers.

By 1973, Bougainville had an 8 team league up and running including Essential Services, Concentrator, Mining, Clerks, CFC, Apprentices, PDF, Hitech.

=== 1970s: International success ===
With the independence of Papua New Guinea, the opportunity presented itself for the first fully-fledged international matches in the sport. In 1973, an Indigenous Australian side selected from an Australian six-state tournament toured Papua New Guinea, led by Roger Rigney, an Indigenous player from South Australian National Football League (SANFL) club Sturt. The following year the return tour saw the PNG side captain coached by Vili Maha defeat the Indigenous Australian side at Ainslie Oval in Canberra. Sogeri Secondary's team travelled to Melbourne and handed its most prestigious football school, Scotch College, a massive defeat.

VFL club South Melbourne, looking for new talent pools, expressed an interest in declaring PNG a recruitment zone. In 1973 outstanding Koboni players Vili Maha and Gimana Guma were flown to Australia to be trialled with the club, playing reserves games however they did not break into the senior side. The following year Maha and Guma's Koboni club were brought to Australia and play against the South Melbourne Football Club reserves which they defeated soundly 14-4-104 to South Melbourne's 6-14-50.

In 1975 Port Moresby B-side defeated the visiting Royal Australian Navy team in front of a crowd of 1,000 spectators.

In October 1976, North Melbourne (VFL) toured and played against PNG at Sir Hubert Murray Stadium in front of a crowd of 8,000 spectators coached by Ron Barassi, North Melbourne won 18-12-120 to 11-10-76. In November 1976, PNG's junior side toured Victoria and played a game against VFL club Geelong, pushing the local side, coached by Kevin Sheehan, who won by just 4 points.

The first ever national side was named in 1976. and its first full international was against Nauru in Port Moresby in front of a crowd of over 10,000 at Sir Hubert Murray Stadium.

In 1977 based on the competitiveness against top VFL sides the governing body, the NFL put forward a proposal for a Papua New Guinea team to enter its knockout NFL Night Series tournament. At the time there were several leagues across the country, including Port Moresby, Goroka, Lae, Madang, Rabaul and Wewak.

1977 saw the first-ever international matches involving Australia at under 17 level between the Victoria Under 17 team (the reigning Australian Champions) and Papua New Guinea.

In August 1977 Victoria's best U17 side 10.17(76) defeated PNG 5.11(41) at Hubert Murray Stadium in front of a crowd of 4,000 spectators. In the reciprocal 1978 tour Papua New Guinea came within two goals of Australia at Football Park in Adelaide.

Also in 1977, a visiting Gold Coast side, topped up this time with players from Victoria and Tasmania, were defeated by a Port Moresby side at Sir Hubert Murray Stadium.

In 1978 the return touring team led by captain-coach Joel Matage lost 15-11-101 narrowly to the Gold Coast home side 17-13-115 in front of a crowd of 5,000 spectators at Salk Oval.

=== VFL raids senior talent ===
In March 1978, following clinics by talent scout Kevin Sheehan, VFL clubs began to express increased interest in PNG's playing talent. Australian volunteer in Lae Richard Kidby in 1978 proclaimed that the rapid growth of the sport was outpacing Australia, saying it was fast becoming the most popular sport and predicted a national team would be capable of defeating a VFL team within 5 years, but lamented the lack of support and vision from Australia. Fitzroy flew William Maha and Peter Pati to train with the club and play in the reserves, North Melbourne picked David Haro and Mea Vui while Hawthorn in October flew in Ambrose Vaki and Peter Pati from Wewak as well as Port Moresby's Martin Tulungan and Tamo Vele. Kevin Sheehan, newly appointed VFL promotional officer, visited Madang; Goroka, Lae, Rabaul, Kieta, Arawa and Port Moresby on November 9.

The senior men's national team coached by Teio Ila was still on a high, thrashing a North Queensland representative side in Cairns by 61 points, leading to the Cairns matches becoming an annual event.

=== 1980s: Australia takes control, ambitious new structure crumbles ===
The National Football League from Australia assumed control of PNG football operations and appointed Peter Evans as full-time manager to the PNG Rules Football Council in May 1978. Evans began a major and rapid restructure of football operations which largely ignored senior club and representative competition in favour of junior development. The PNG Rules Football Council was renamed the PNG Australian Rules Football Council and he set out to point out the ignorance of local players to the rules in an effort to eliminate any violence though the reverse occurred, with violence under the new administration dramatically increasing to a point where it was almost out of control, with several notable incidents of striking of umpires occurring and life bans instituted. The administration also banned players from national selection if their league refused to affiliate with the new administration, causing significant discontent with players outside of the national capital. The senior men's national championships were cancelled and funds diverted so that Evans, using his position as PNG National Sports Secretary, could fly a junior squad to Hobart in 1979 to participate in the Teal Cup (Australian Under 17 Championship). The team suffered humiliating defeats at the hands of the ACT, New South Wales and South Australia which was widely reported as a failure in the local media. Shortly following the tournament Evans resigned to become Tasmanian Football League chief administrator. and management of the now financially destitute administration was handed to local player William Maha. The NFL's Victorian chief John Warren visited in 1980 promising a A$100,000 injection of funds and sponsorship from Rothmans International and admission to the council though along with high expectations of the underresourced local competition for coaches, umpires and ground upgrades. Warren was openly critical of all administrators, playing style and coaches involved in the game outside of Port Moresby. PNG was, however, (unlike the Northern Territory) never admitted as a full-voting member.

With the VFL's more powerful position in national football administration and the National Football League's loss of control of the game in Australia, after 2 years of restructuring and promise, PNG was left without either an administration or funding support. With the withdrawal of the NFL and VFL from Papua New Guinea, the governing body dropped all reference to Australia in its name and reverted to the PNG Rules Football Council. To make matters worse, while rules was being banned from schools, soccer, despite not attracting an audience received more than double the funding for junior development, with Rules now attracting less than softball and netball. Rules officials lamented that while the sport in 1981 was still the third most popular in the country, having not participated in any senior international matches since 1978, its recognition as a sport at national level had all but ceased. Unlike the NFL, the VFL was occupied with the expansion its Victorian competition interstate, beginning with the relocation of the South Melbourne Football Club to Sydney. The impact was immediate and profound, with the Port Moresby League being the only league still financial and the national team severely underfunded. The "national" PNG team (consisting almost solely of Port Moresby players) travelled to the Gold Coast in 1980 where they were defeated by a representative Gold Coast team. Under overwhelming financial pressure, the PNG Rules Council was forced to cancel the National Championships for the first time leaving a gaping hole in the competition. Regional leagues were left with crippling debts threatening the future of the national championships. Soccer and rugby league were being promoted as safer options than Rules, with much lower injury rates and several provinces banned Rules from schools out of concern for student welfare due to increasing violence. Most notably, Morobe Province banned the sport altogether in schools. The rapid decline of junior development and the focus on senior talent was lamented. In a last ditch attempt to save the administration in 1982, members of the PNG Rules Council pushed for radical plans to move the rules season into the summer months.

The collapse of the local administration signalled the end of Rules Football in PNG for some time. The popularity of rugby league, which begun being televised in the late 1970s, particularly the New South Wales Rugby League and Rugby League State of Origin matches between Queensland and New South Wales, skyrocketed. Apart from the VFL Grand Final, Australian Rules matches during the 1980s were rarely televised. Australian government aid funding was increasingly being allocated to other sports, particularly rugby league and soccer. Players disgruntled with the collapse of the local Rules leagues switched to League in droves. With the introduction of the Kumuls to the Rugby League World Cup in 1985 and international matches were being regularly played in Port Moresby, Rules fell out of favour. Rugby league dominated the media and Rules was virtually forgotten. A small base of dedicated but ageing senior players continued to play with no officials, umpires or funding. Most of the local leagues went in and out of liquidation and were all but disbanded.

=== 1990s: International Revival ===
The nearby administration body in Cairns stepped in and commencing in 1990 there was regular competition against teams from the Cairns Australian Football League.

In 1993, PNG Rules interim chairman Vili Maha led the rebranding of the national team as the "Mosquitos".

Competition in Rabaul went into hiatus in 1992, and efforts to revive the code were overshadowed by the 1994 volcanic eruption.

PNG's senior national team, the Mosquitoes, competed for the first time at the 1995 Arafura Games in Darwin, Northern Territory. The "Mosquitos" were a success, winning the gold medal by defeating New Zealand in the Grand Final. PNG players named in the World Team named at the tournament were George Kava, Willie Lipou, Thomas Gori and Tony Megea.

In 1995, after PNG's success at the Arafura Games, Ed Biggs from the then Australian Football Foundation (AFF) and Ian Collins from the AFL visited all the major Australian football centres in PNG and had discussions with officials.

PNG Rules Football Council officials were advised to draw up a three-year development plan to qualify for football development assistance. The plan was to include a summary of the current state of Rules Football in PNG, a management structure, facilities improvement, development proposals and financial estimates.

In August 1996 the Mosquitoes travelled to Perth as part of the AFL Centenary Celebrations. They played a match against the Central Desert Eagles as a curtain-raiser to a West Coast Eagles v. Carlton match. PNG 21.22 (148) defeated the Central Desert Eagles 5.8 (38).

PNG defended their gold medal at the 1997 Arafura Games, defeating New Zealand 14.9 (93) to 9.6 (60) in the final. PNG also played against the NTFL, Australian Defence Force and Central Desert Eagles as well as their international counterparts. PNG players named in the 1997 World Team were Gibson Isaiah, George Kaore, David Lucas and Willie Lipou.

In 1999 PNG again defeated New Zealand in the final at the Arafura Games. In the same year, a record 5,000 spectators attended the Wests vs Koboni Grand Final in Port Moresby.

=== 2000s: The Mal Michael Effect and Junior Boom ===
Papua New Guinea born Mal Michael, with strong indigenous and community links, began playing in the AFL in 1997 and his career raised significant interest, spurring a rekindling of junior interest and numbers.

In 2000 the AFL sent a Development Officer, Andrew Cadzow, to PNG. Based in Port Moresby, Cadzow also visited other regional centres.

AFL PNG was established in August 2001. AFL PNG is the representative of the AFL in PNG and has been incorporated to coordinate, support and operate Junior Development and Community-based programs relating to AFL footy in PNG. Scott Reid, Salvatore Algeri and Mel Togolo are the current Directors of AFL PNG and are responsible for establishing and promoting AFL Junior Development Programs in PNG.

PNG born Mal Michael participated in the first of three premierships with the Brisbane Lions in 2001, boosting the popularity of football enormously in the country.

In 2002, the Mosquitos finished second behind Ireland in the inaugural Australian Football International Cup.

In 2003, Alister Sioni won the AFL PNG Elite Scholarship and trained with the Brisbane Lions between 11 November and 23 December.

2005 was a big year for football in PNG. In the International Cup, the Mosquitos finished in second place behind New Zealand.

Also in 2005, AFL Queensland took AFL PNG "under its wing" to provide a pathway for PNG players to the AFL. Queensland is one of the nearest and most populous Australian states, and a result, there are now many junior and senior PNG players participating in Queensland state championships and clubs. Additional funding came from Queensland since, and the Mal Michael Foundation was established in the same year to further foster PNG talent.

In October 2006, the national junior Women's Footy (U16) team, the "Karakums" became the first ever female contact sport side to represent PNG.

In 2006, Papua New Guinea under 16s again won the U16s Queensland Country Championships, defeating Cairns in the Grand Final. Several PNG players were selected to represent the Country Kookaburras U16s squad which lost the Grand Final to the Northern Raiders. Port Moresby's Stanis Susave, became the first player from Papua New Guinea to represent the Queensland Scorpions in the under 16s.

In 2007, U16 Bintangs were invited to the all-Queensland state championships, managing one win out of three by defeating the AFLQ Colts. The U14s followed.

In November, the PNG girls Under 17 squad went through the QLD state championships undefeated to take the title outright. Only Cape York were able to register a score against the junior Karakums.

Outstanding PNG juniors Stanis Susuve and John James were invited to the AFL/AIS Draft Camp in November 2007.

Several players to learn the game in PNG began reaching senior level in Australia in various regional and state leagues in 2007. During the year, 13 Papua New Guinean players represented the Coolangatta-Tweed Heads AFC at senior level in Division 2 of the Queensland State League since 2000, with five playing in the senior team in 2007 - David Evertius, Donald Barry, Johnny James, Emmaus Wartovo and Ali Pinda. Donald Barry, Elijah Baruai and Bergmann Talingapua were all recruited from PNG in 2007 to play for the Manunda Hawks in the AFL Cairns competition.

The expanding program has also seen several PNG players introduced the Sunshine Coast league including Emmanuel Tupia, John Vogae, Gary Kiele and Peter Labi in 2009.

In March 2008, John James became the first player from Papua New Guinea to represent Queensland in the Under 18 National Championships.

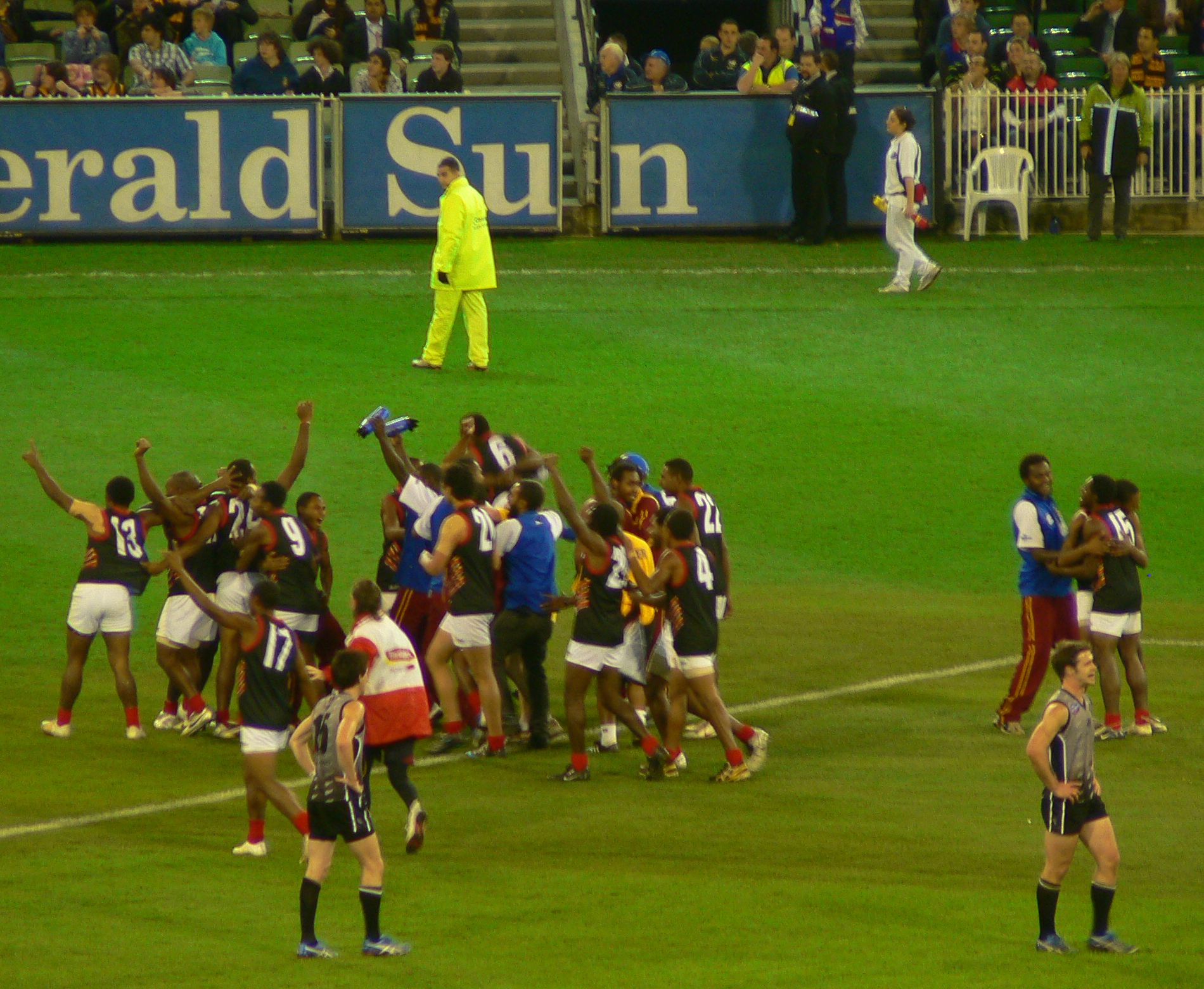
The Mosquitos celebrate winning the 2008 International Cup after the siren in a thriller at the Melbourne Cricket Ground

In September 2008, the Mosquitos took out the 2008 International Cup against New Zealand by 8 points at the Melbourne Cricket Ground.

In November 2008, 17-year-old Tianen Carbry was invited to the AIS/AFL academy.

In January 2009, 17-year-old Amua Parika was signed by the Gold Coast Football Club to play in the AFL. He was followed shortly after by the Gold Coast's signing of talented junior Stanis Susuve and 17-year-old Peter Labi joined the Carlton Football Club on an international scholarship.

=== 2010s: International Success ===
In 2014 Papua New Guinea sent a side to the Under-16 South Pacific Cup in Coffs Harbour, Australia in addition to taking out the senior men's International Cup in Melbourne.

Papua New Guinea won the 2017 International Cup in Melbourne.

In 2017 Hewago Oea represented Queensland U18 (he was later selected in the AFL Draft Academy), followed in Queensland representative football by 2018 by Jason Logi, Rex Peregua and Joe Yamog represented Queensland U16, followed by Glen Saniong and Benedict Baro in 2019.

In 2019, PNG fielded a club team known as the Muruks, in the Asian Australian Football Championships for the first time, which they won defeating a large number of sides featuring experienced expatriate Australian players.

In October 2022, the Australian government announced its commitment to a support package for the sport in Papua New Guinea.

In 2023 Papua New Guinea sent its male and female national talent academies to Queensland for a series of test matches in Brisbane and the Gold Coast against Nauru's national teams and local sides. PNG went down to Nauru in both international matches with the Nauru men's winning in the final minute of the game 5.8(38) to 5.7(27), in the women's match, a PNG shot at goal after the siren fell short resulting in Nauru holding on 3.9(27) to PNG's 3.4(22).

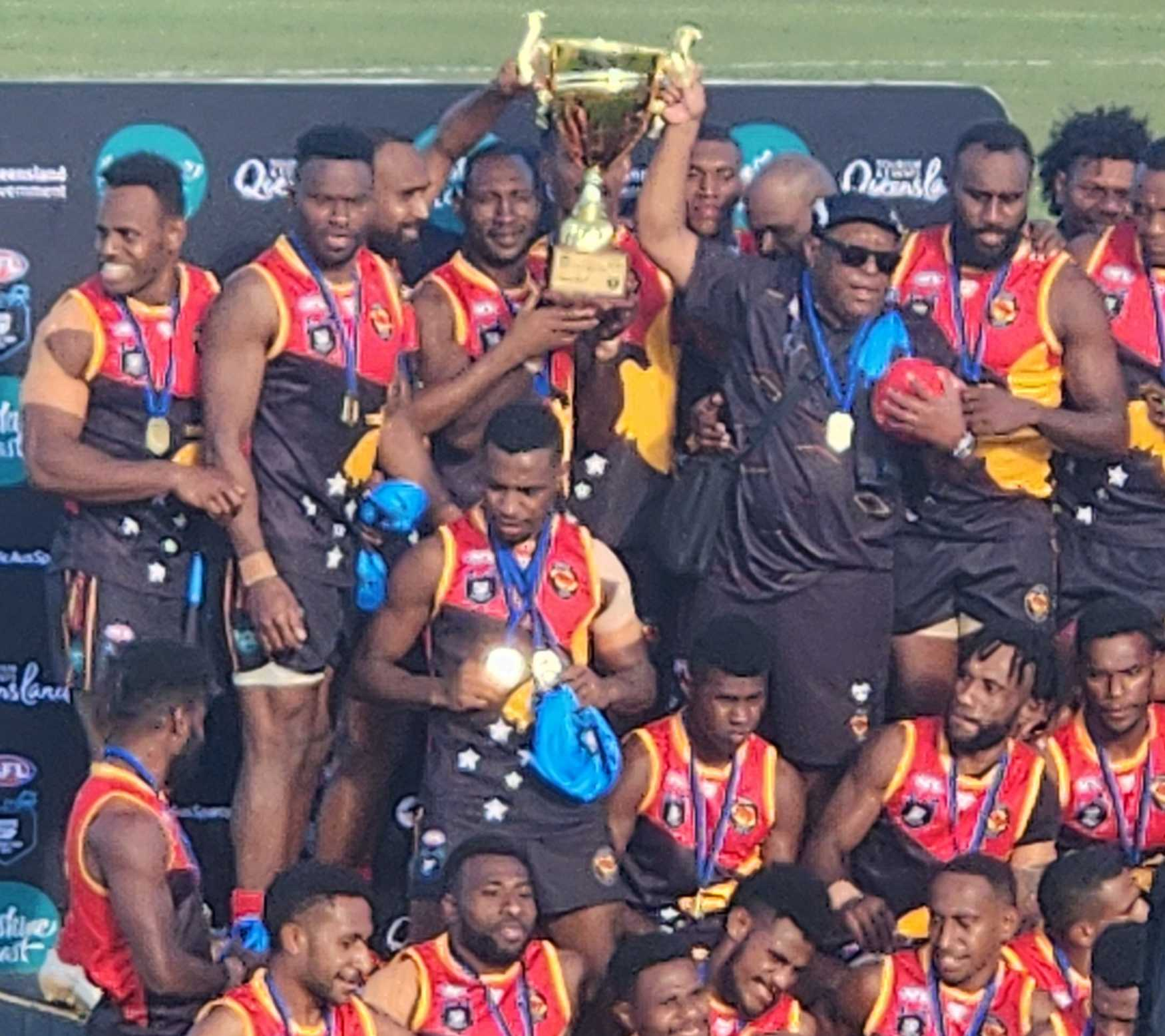
National men's team, AFL Pacific Cup holders at Maroochydore Queensland in 2024

The senior men's team won the 2024 Pacific Cup at Maroochydore, Queensland after the International Cup was cancelled.

== National Teams ==
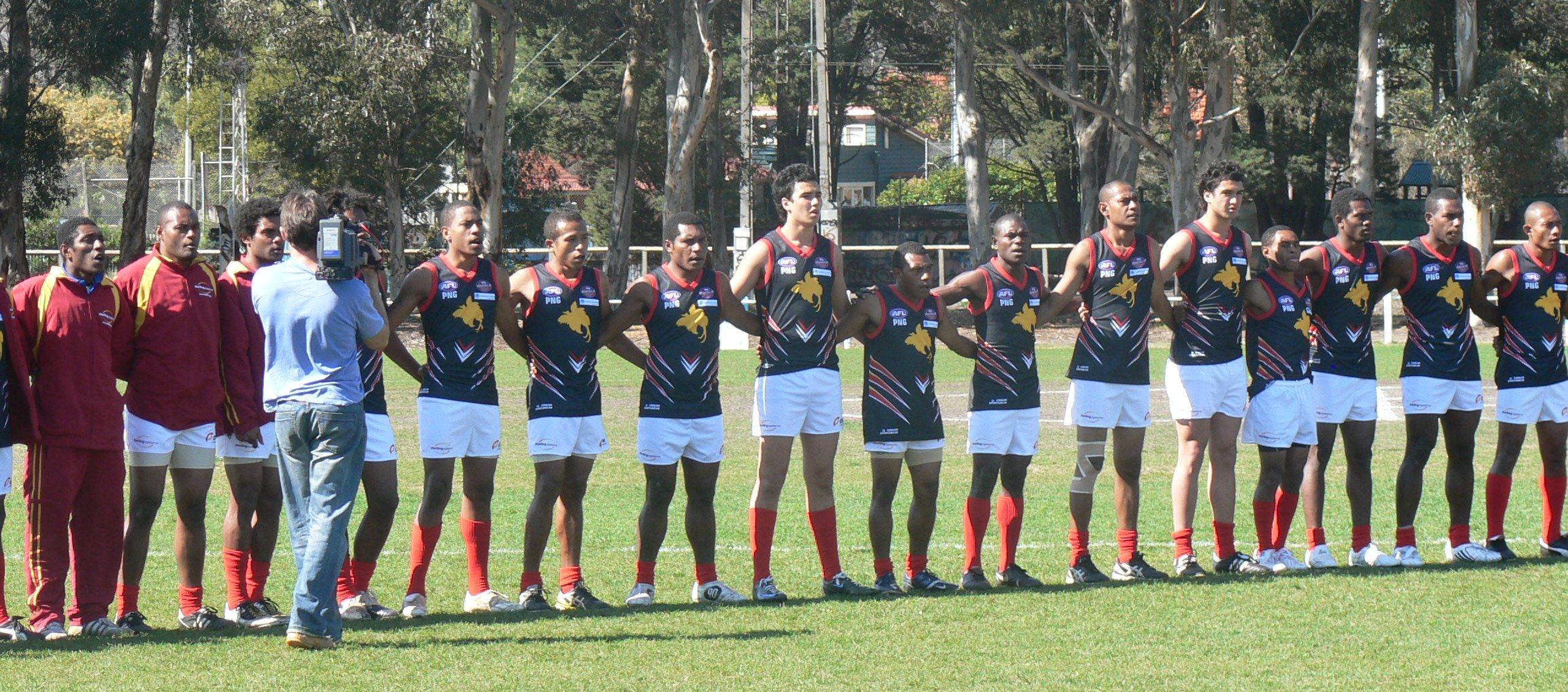
Papua New Guinea's national team line up for the national anthem at the 2008 International Cup in Melbourne

PNG's national team is the Mosquitoes.

They debuted in 1973 at Under 17 level against Australia but have not played Australia since.

In 1976, PNG defeated Nauru by 129 points in front of a crowd of over 10,000 at Sir Hubert Murray Stadium. The team were international champions when they won the 2008 Australian Football International Cup.

The team has also tasted success in the past with a gold medal in the Arafura Games and silver at both 2002 and 2005 International Cups.

The national women's team is known as the Karakums. They have competed in Australian provincial championships and the International Cup.

== Funding & sponsorship ==
Despite having the second-highest number of players and one of the highest junior participation growth rates for the sport in the world, the sport in Papua New Guinea receives one of the lowest allocations of funding from the AFL. The international governing body provides much lower funding than South Africa despite PNG being closer and has instead insisted that AFL PNG source funds through AusAID, however this has not been forthcoming. In recent years, sponsors have helped fill the void left by a lack of AFL funding. AFL PNG survives on a small group of sponsors.

Major development funding comes from the following primary sources, including:

Sponsor	Sponsored	Amount p/a (PGK$)	Total	Years
Paradise Foods	National junior programs (including Niukick)	150,000	450,000	2022-(2025)
Paradise Foods	National junior programs (including Niukick)	100,000	300,000	2020-2022
Paradise Foods	National junior programs (including Niukick)	50,000	150,000	2018-2019
Bank South Pacific	Port Moresby Senior premiership			2013-
Australian Sports Outreach Program (ASOP) & DirectAid (Australian High Commission Papua New Guinea)	Equipment for junior programs			2007-
Pacific Sports Partnership (PSP) program	Overall participation			-2018
B-Mobile	National junior programs	100,000	300,000	2009–2012
Australian Football League	AFL PNG	45,000		2005-
Telekom PNG	Senior national team	40,000		2008-
Oil Search	AFL PNG national junior programs	?		2002-

== Leagues and Competitions ==
Competition	Region	Commenced	#Clubs	#Men's	#Women's	Clubs	Representative side
Port Moresby Australian Rules Football League	National Capital District	1955	11	10	6	Port Moresby Dockers FC; Bismark Eagles; Lamana Dockers; Koboni Demons; Port; Cats; University Tigers; Gordon Kokofas; Gerehu Magpies; Gereka Bombers; Alavana Swans	NCD
Lae	Morobe Province	1969	8	6	2	Port Powers; City Bullets; Kabrats Hawks; Maiba Saints; Town Cats; Kamkamung Titans; Salle Dogs; Suns Meri	Lae
Mt Hagen	Western Highlands Province	1969					
Kimbe	West New Britain Province	1970	6	6		Bali Hawks; Central Magpies; SBLC Buluma; Talkom; Tamara; True West	
Goroka (formerly Eastern Highlands (District) Australian Rules Football League)	Eastern Highlands Province	1971	4	4		Apo Stars; Asaroka; Mt Kiss; UPNG Goroka	

- In hiatus

=== National Championships ===
The National Championships have been held since 1966. The Cleland Medal (named after Sir Donald Cleland, Australian administrator of the territories) was first awarded in 1964 is for the best and fairest player, which has at times this has been awarded across all provinces, and others for Papua or the Port Moresby League only.

Year	Host/Venue	National Champions	Cleland Medallist/s
1964			Herea Amini (Sogeri); Dave Tarrant
1965			Ila Vele (Teachers College)
1966		Papua	Michael Bai (Defence)
1967		Papua	Peter Aberton (Aviat)
1968		Papua	Vuina Wapa (Moresby)
1969		Papua	Max Bennett (12 votes) (PIR)
1970		Papua	Daryl Steward (13 votes) (PIR)
1971		Papua	Vili Maha (13 votes) (Koboni)
1972		Papua	Boga Tali (13 votes) (Aviat); Vili Maha (13 votes) (Koboni)
1973	Port Moresby	Papua	Oscar Taule (16 votes) (Koboni)
1975	Lae Showgrounds	Papua	Api Leka (14 votes) (Koboni)
1976	Lae (cancelled)	-	David Haro (14 votes) (NBC)
1977	Lae	Moresby	Peter Pati (22 votes) (Halgu)
1978	Lae	Moresby	William Maha (26 votes) (Koboni)
1979	Lae	Lae	James Logha (13 votes) (Boroko)
1980	Madang (cancelled)	-	Paul Sipori (22 votes) (Defence)
1981	Lae	NCD	
1995		Lae	
1996		NCD	
1997		NCD	
1998		NCD	
1999		NCD	
2000		Hoskins¹	
2001		²	
2002		²	
2003			
2004		NCD	
2005		²	

¹The national titles in 2000 attracted teams from Buka, Pomio, Rabaul, Kove, Hoskins, Kimbe, Lae, Mt Hagen and National Capital District (Port Moresby). ²There were no championships staged in 2001, 2002 (due to the International Cup) or 2005 (due to the International Cup).

== Governing body ==
The governing body is the PNG Rules Football Council. The development body is AFL PNG.

== Audience ==
=== Television ===
AFL Highlights programs are shown on PNG television, including EM TV. Live matches are broadcast on ABC Asia Pacific.

=== Attendance ===
Despite calls from Mal Michael to hold AFL pre-season matches in Port Moresby, to date no official AFL matches have ever been played in PNG. Both St Kilda and North Melbourne clubs when the league was branded VFL have played against a local representative team and Australian Rules matches played there sometimes still draw big crowds and interest. This has been hampered by the major oval stadium used for the sport in the past, Sir Hubert Murray Stadium, being converted into rectangular configuration in 2003. Rectangular stadiums in the country now greatly outnumber oval stadiums and there remain no other suitable venues with spectator facilities apart from Amini Park which has been locked up to the sport by cricket authorities.

The following are notable crowds for matches played in Papua New Guinea:

Attendance	Date	Match Teams	Location	Notes/References
10,000	1976	PNG vs Nauru	Sir Hubert Murray Stadium. Port Moresby	
8,000	1976	PNG vs North Melbourne (VFL)	Sir Hubert Murray Stadium. Port Moresby,	VFL premiers North Melbourne won 18-12-120 to 11-10-76
7,500	2009	Central Highlands vs Flying Boomerangs (Indigenous tour of PNG)	Lae	
6,000	1977	Koboni vs Moresby POM AFL (Grand Final)	Sir Hubert Murray Stadium, Port Moresby	
6,000	1973	PNG vs Aboriginal Australia	Sir Hubert Murray Stadium, Port Moresby	Final score Papua New Guinea 17.19 (121) def All-Stars 12.18 (90)
5,000	1969	PNG vs St Kilda (VFL)	South Pacific Oval, Port Moresby	Final score 9-17-61 to 1-6-12
5,000	1999	Wests vs Koboni POM AFL (Grand Final)	Port Moresby	
4,000	1977	PNG U17 vs Victoria U17	Sir Hubert Murray Stadium, Port Moresby	
3,000	1969	Paramedical vs Busy Bees (Madang Grand Final)	Madang, Territory of New Guinea	
3,000	1969	Koboni vs Moresby POM AFL (Grand Final)	Port Moresby	
3,000	2012	Koboni vs Taurama POM AFL (Grand Final)	Murray Barracks Oval, Port Moresby	
2,500	2009	PNG (U18) Kupundas vs Flying Boomerangs (Indigenous tour of PNG)	University of Papua New Guinea Port Moresby	
2,000	2012	University vs Gordons POM AFL (Grand Final)	Amini Park, Port Moresby	
2,000	1979	Rabaul vs North Solomons	Rabaul	
1,000	1976	Port Moresby B vs Royal Australian Navy	Murray Barracks, Port Moresby	

== Players ==
Papua New Guineans have played professional and semi-professional Australian rules football in Australia, and have dominated the All-International amateur team for many years. More recently, AFL clubs have taken an interest in recruiting PNG talent. However, there are major inhibitors for recruitment, mainly height, with many of the more talented players being under 176 cm which is typically considered too short for professional AFL, strict visa entry rules that limit the amount of time that PNG nationals can develop in Australia, as well as language and cultural barriers.

=== Men's ===
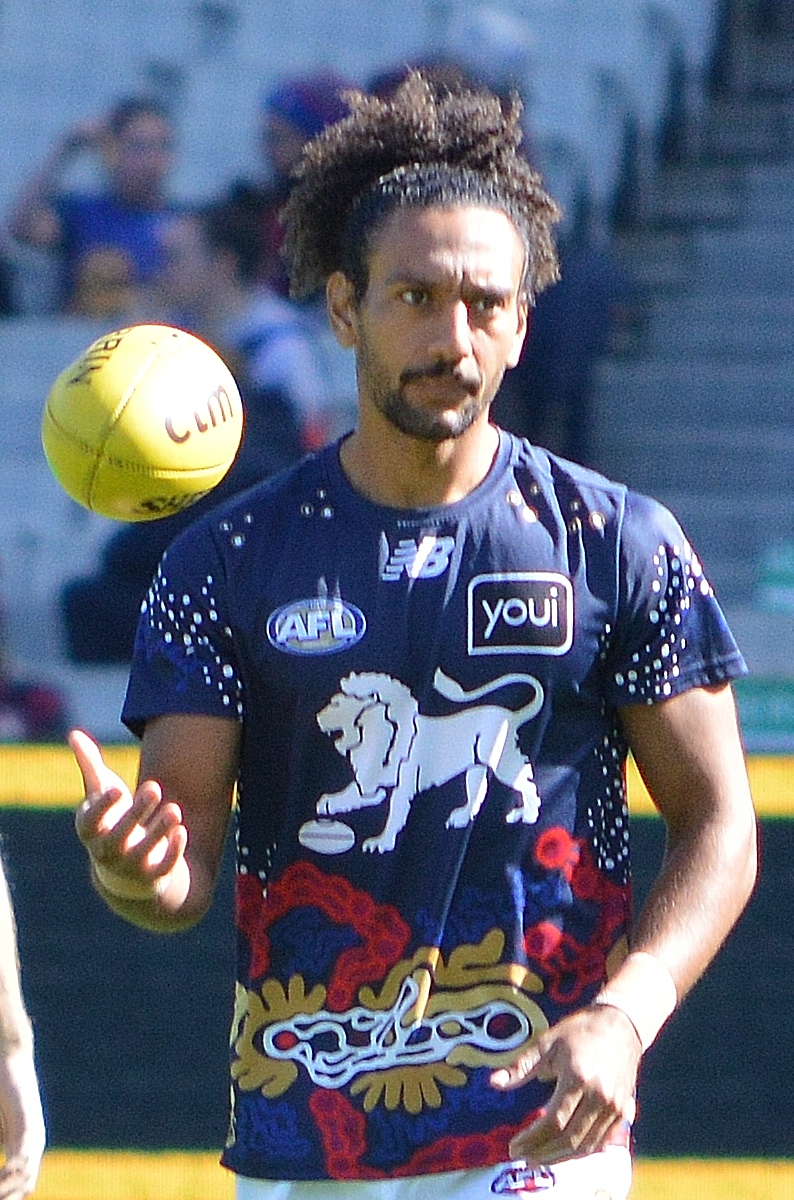
Bruce Reville playing for the Brisbane Lions in 2025

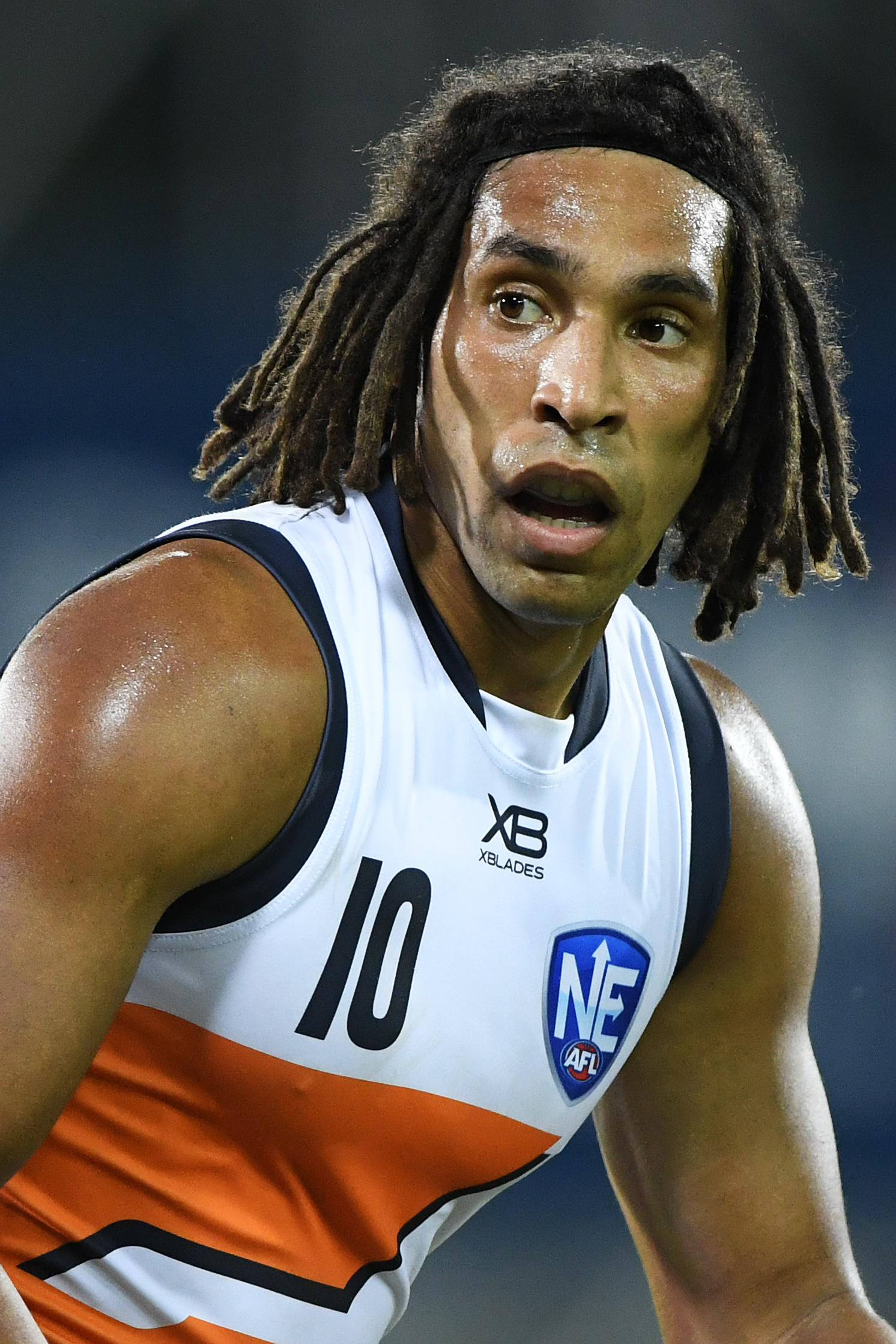
Aiden Bonar playing for Greater Western Sydney in 2019

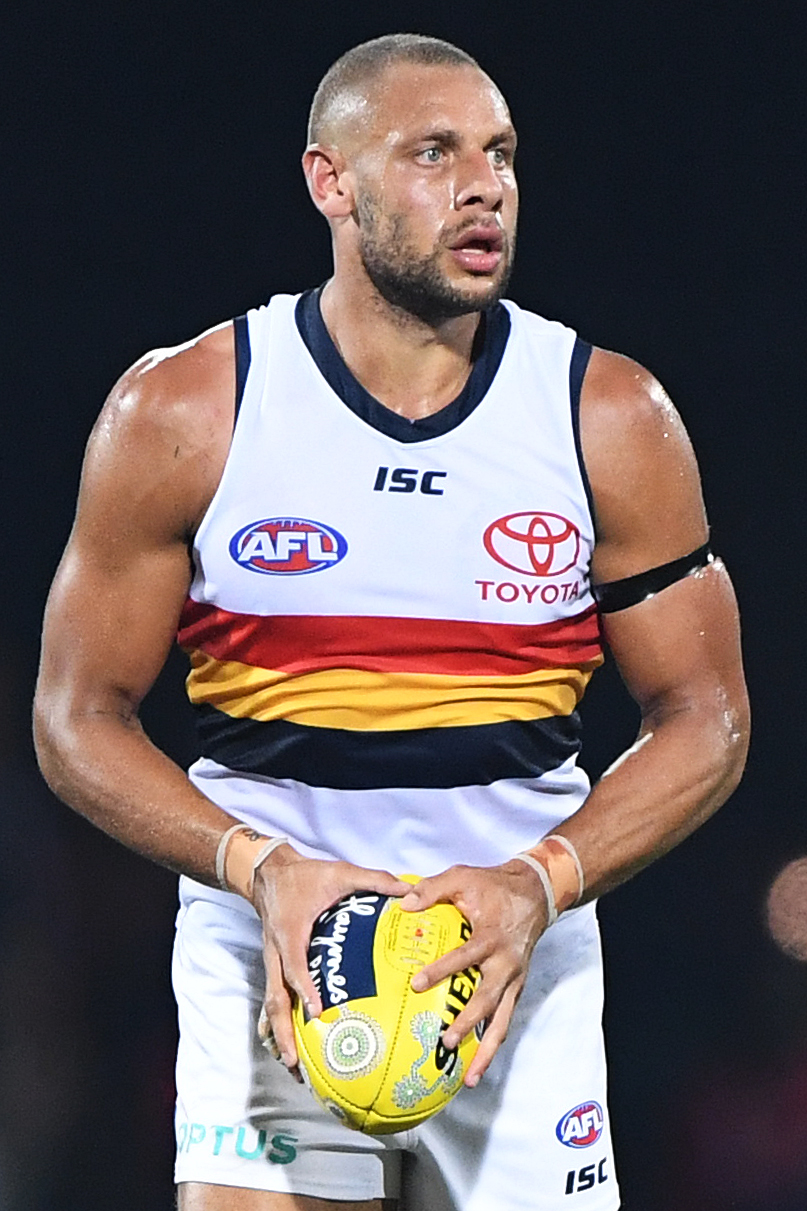
Cam Ellis-Yolmen playing for Adelaide in 2019

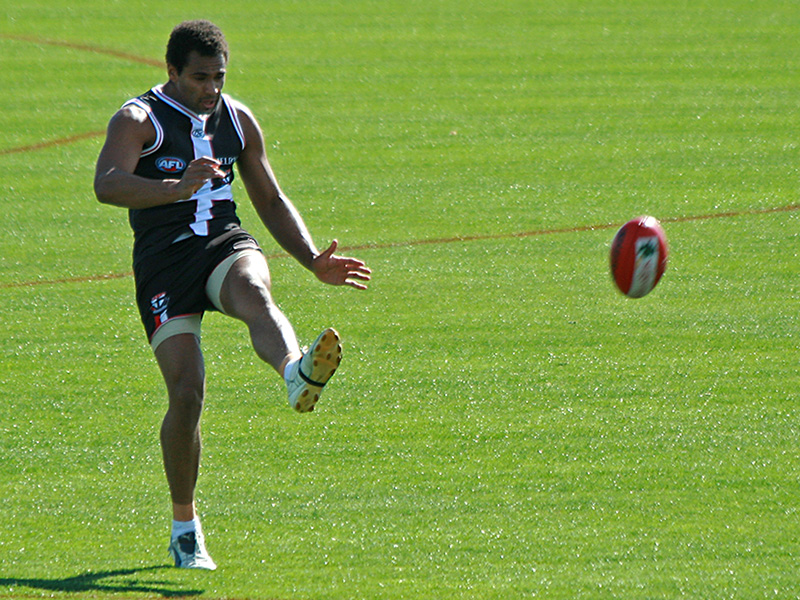
James Gwilt playing for St Kilda in 2009

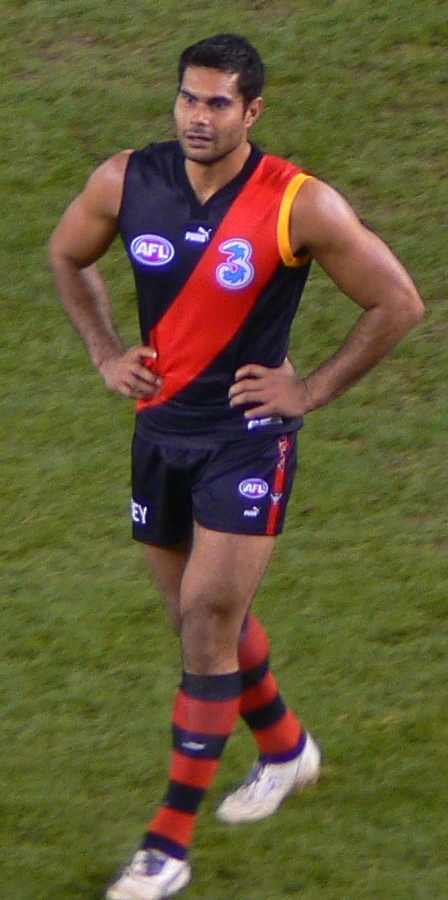
Mal Michael playing for Essendon in 2007

Currently on an AFL senior or rookie list

Player	AFL Years*	AFL Matches*	AFL Goals	AFL Draft	AFL Draft Selection	Club played/plays for	Representative honours	Connections to Papua New Guinea, References
Bruce Reville	2023-	16	6	2023	Category B rookie	Brisbane Lions (VFL/AFL)		Born
Hewago Oea	2022-2024	13	5	2020	Category B rookie	Gold Coast (NEAFL/VFL/AFL)	PNG U14 (?), South Pacific U16 (2016) / Papua New Guinea (2017)	Born and raised in Gordon, Port Moresby International premiership (2017); All-International (2017)
Patrick Murtagh	2019-2022	-	-	2019	Category B rookie	Gold Coast (NEAFL/VFL)		Mother
Aiden Bonar	2018-2013	34	5	2017	#11	GWS, North Melbourne		Mother
Peter Ladhams	2017-	50	25	2017	(rookie)	Port Adelaide / Sydney Swans		Born
Ollie Wines	2013-	214	90			Port Adelaide		Parent
Nick Vlastuin	2013-	211	29			Richmond		Father
Cam Ellis-Yolmen	2012-2022	48	18			Adelaide, Brisbane		Father
Gideon Simon	2013–2014	-	-			Richmond (Coburg, VFL)	Papua New Guinea (2014, 2017)	Born and raised International premiership (2014, 2017); All-international (2014) (172 cm 71 kg) International Rookie selection 2012 AFL Draft
Brendan Beno	2011–2012	-	-			Brisbane Lions (reserves)	Papua New Guinea (2011, 2014, 2017)	Born and raised in Buka, Bougainville International scholarship (2011); International premiership (2014, 2017); (170 cm 62 kg)
Theo Gavuri	2011-2012	-	-			GWS Giants	South Pacific U16 (2010); Papua New Guinea (2011, 2014)	Born and raised in Kimbe. International scholarship (2011). International premiership (2014). (168 cm 69 kg)
John James Lavai	2010–2011	-	-			Brisbane Lions (reserves)	Papua New Guinea (2011, 2014 c, 2017 c)	Born and raised International scholarship (2011) (170 cm 62 kg) AFL/AIS Draft camp (2017) International premiership (2014, 2017) All-International (2017)
David Meli	2009-2010	-	-			Essendon Football Club (reserves)	Papua New Guinea (2008, 2011, 2014)	Born and raised. International Rookie (2009) Recruited from Southport (AFL Queensland) (175 cm 76 kg) born 11 Sep 1992. His father, Peter, won three Arafura Games titles with the Mosquitos and played in the 2002 International Cup Grand Final side. International premiership (2008, 2014)
Donald Barry	2009-2011	-	-			Brisbane Lions (reserves)	Papua New Guinea (2008, 2011)	Born and raised. Recruited from Coolangatta (AFL Queensland State League) / Manunda Hawks (AFL Cairns). International premiership (2008); International Cup Grand Final best on ground (2008); All-International (2008). (177 cm 76 kg)
Peter Labi	2009-2010	-	-			Carlton (reserves)	Papua New Guinea (2008, 2011, 2014)	Born and raised International Scholarship (2009) (186 cm 82 kg) International premiership (2008, 2014)
Stanis Susuve	2009-2010	-	-			Gold Coast (reserves) / Brisbane Lions (reserves)	Papua New Guinea (2008, 2011, 2014)	Born and raised. AFL/AIS Draft camp (2007) International Rookie (2009) (190 cm 80 kg) International premiership (2008, 2014) All-International (2008, 2011). He originally won a scholarship to play with the Zillmere Eagles in the same competition where he once kicked a haul of 15 goals in the reserve grade premiership and won the club's Most Valuable Player (MVP) award. Represented PNG in Rugby Sevens at the 2015 Pacific Games
Amua Pirika	2009-2010	-	-			Gold Coast (reserves) / Brisbane Lions (reserves)	Papua New Guinea (2014, 2017)	Born and raised. Queensland Zone selection [88]; International premiership (2014, 2017); All-international (2014) (190 cm 80 kg)
James Gwilt	2005–2016	152	25			St Kilda, Essendon		Mother Father played in Port Moresby.
Alistair Sione	2003–2004	-	-			Brisbane	Papua New Guinea (2005, 2008)	Born and raised in West New Britain International scholarship (2003); All-International (2005, 2008); International premiership (2008)
Mal Michael	1997–2008	238	33			Collingwood, Brisbane, Essendon	Pacific Islands (2009), Papua New Guinea (2010)	Born (Port Moresby); Mother Father played in Port Moresby.
Winis Imbi	1997-1998	-	-			Essendon Football Club (reserves), North Melbourne Football Club (rookie), Ballarat Rebels	Papua New Guinea (2011)	Born #19 Rookie 1997 (172 cm)
Ben Sexton	1991–1996	43	33			Footscray, Carlton		Born
Michael Sexton	1990–2000	200	23			Carlton		Born (Lae)
Gimana Guma	1973	-	-			South Melbourne (reserves)	Papua New Guinea (1975)	Recruited from Koboni
Vili Maha	1973	-	-			South Melbourne (reserves)	Papua New Guinea (1976)	Recruited from Koboni
Herea Amini	1964	-	-			Melbourne (reserves)	Papua New Guinea (1975, 1976)	Recruited from Koboni

==== Other Notable Players ====
- Navu Maha - (172 cm 80 kg) Maha trained with the South Melbourne Swans VFL team in Melbourne in the 1980s. He became captain of the Mosquitos during the 2002 and 2005 International Cups and two time All-International who has also represented Papua New Guinea in cricket.
- Marcus Bai - an Aussie Rules junior who went on to become a standout rugby league player.
- Alister Sioni - (185 cm 80 kg) a West New Britain player who won a scholarship and was invited to train with the Brisbane Lions in the pre-season of 2003, has also played in AFL Cairns seniors and was named in the 2005 All-International team. He captained the Mosquitos for the 2008 International Cup where he received a premiership medal.
- James Imbi - (180 cm) the younger brother of Winis Imbi was also born in PNG and played with Winis at Portland since 2005. After trying out with the Sturt Football Club in the South Australian National Football League in 2004, Imbi went to the Palmerston Football Club in the Northern Territory Football League where he plays in the off-season. By round 8, 2005, Imbi had led in the ABC NTFL player of the year count with 11 votes. In 2007, like his brother, he won the Western Border Football League best and fairest.
- Jerry Frank - played 13 years for the Palmerston Football Club in the Northern Territory Football League as a defender before retiring in 2007. Born in Port Moresby to a Papuan father and Torres Strait Islands mother he was a member of eight NT representative sides and played against a number of AFL clubs including Collingwood, Fremantle, Brisbane and also WAFL clubs.

=== Women's ===
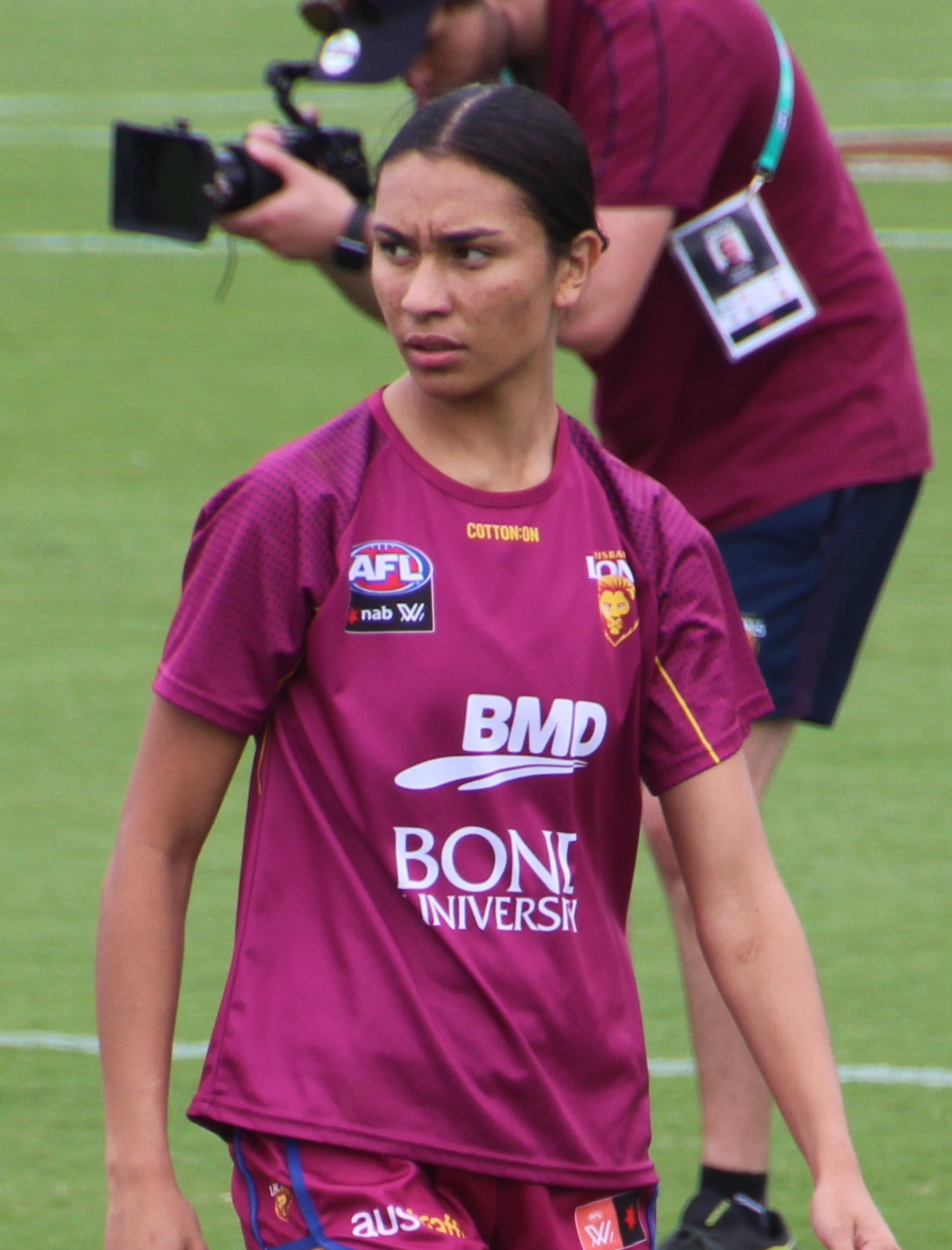
Zimmorlei Farquharson with the Brisbane Lions in 2022

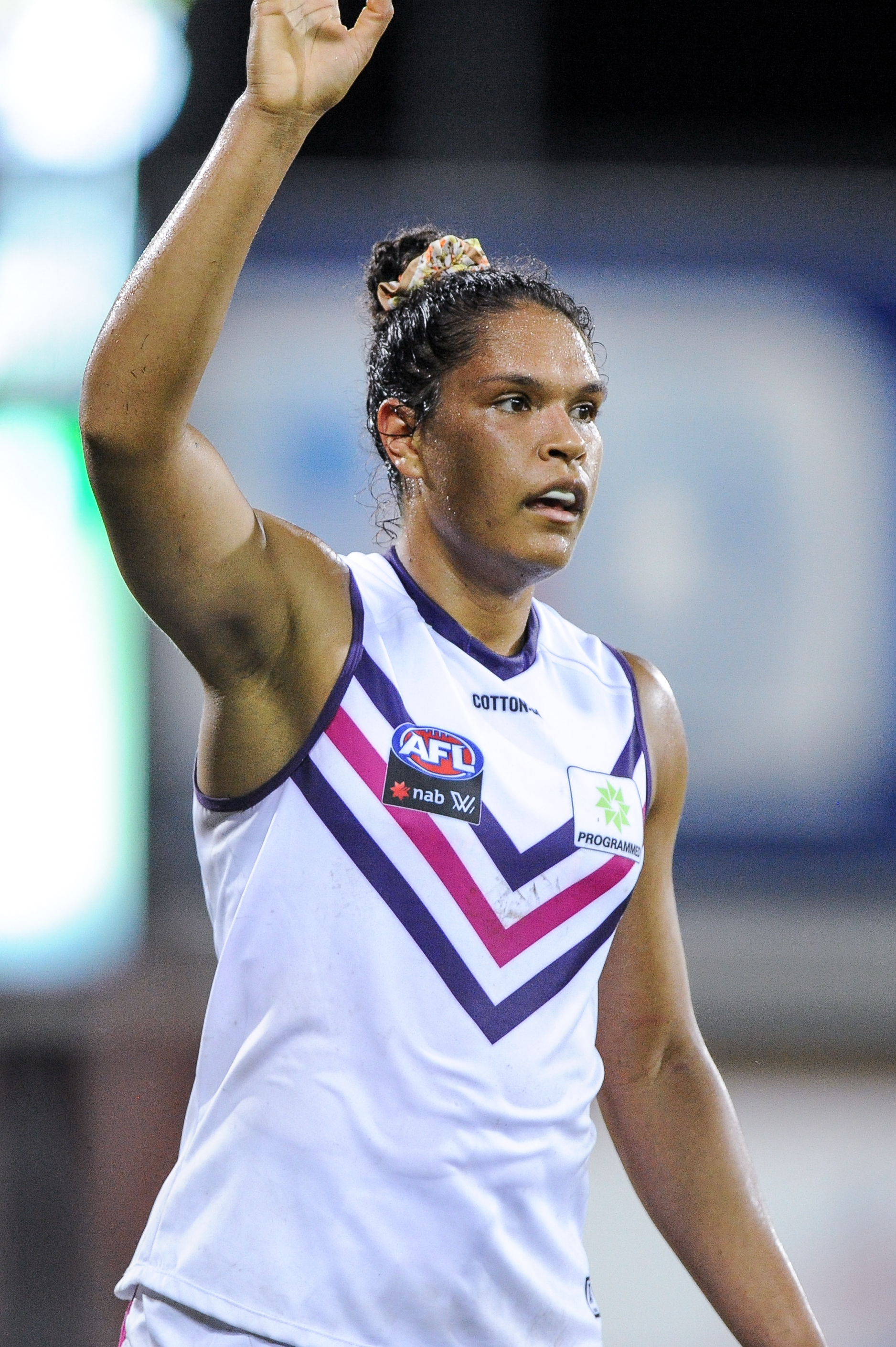
Alicia Janz with Fremantle in 2018

Currently on an AFLW senior or rookie list

Player	AFLW Years*	AFLW Matches*	AFLW Goals	Club played/plays for	Connections to Papua New Guinea, References
Zimmorlei Farquharson	2021-	10	7	Brisbane, Western Bulldogs	Mother
Alicia Janz	2017-2021	20	0	Fremantle	Mother

== See also ==
- AFL PNG
- Sport in Papua New Guinea
