= Sport in Papua New Guinea =

Sport in Papua New Guinea is an important part of the national culture. Rugby league is the most popular sport in Papua New Guinea.

Other popular sports include most football codes (like Australian rules football, soccer and rugby union) cricket, volleyball, softball, netball, and basketball. Other Olympic sports are also gaining popularity, such as boxing and weightlifting.

== Rugby league ==
Rugby league is the most popular sport in Papua New Guinea. Rugby league also holds the title as the national sport. About 50% of the population under-20 play rugby league. Since 2010, the sport has been a mandatory part of the curriculum in all schools in Papua New Guinea.

In a nation where communities are far apart and many people live at a minimal subsistence level, rugby league has been described as a replacement for tribal warfare, as a way of explaining the local enthusiasm for the game (a matter of life and death). Port Moresby Governor Powes Parkop has described the role rugby league plays in bonding the nation's 800 disparate tribes and reducing crime, citing its "ability to impact positively on all walks of life in PNG".

Many Papua New Guineans have become instant celebrities by representing their country or playing in an overseas professional league. The West New Britain rugby league player, Marcus Bai, is a national celebrity after he formerly played for the National Rugby League with Melbourne Storm and in Super League for Leeds Rhinos and David Mead who hails from the Central Province he currently plays for the Brisbane Broncos and is considered one of Papua New Guinea's all-time greatest players. Rhyse Martin has had success in the English game, winning the 2020 Challenge Cup with Leeds Rhinos.

The Papua New Guinea national rugby league team, known as the Kumuls, are ranked sixth in the world as of December 2024. In December 2024, the NRL announced the admittance of a Papua New Guinea-based franchise from the 2028 season.

== Australian rules football ==
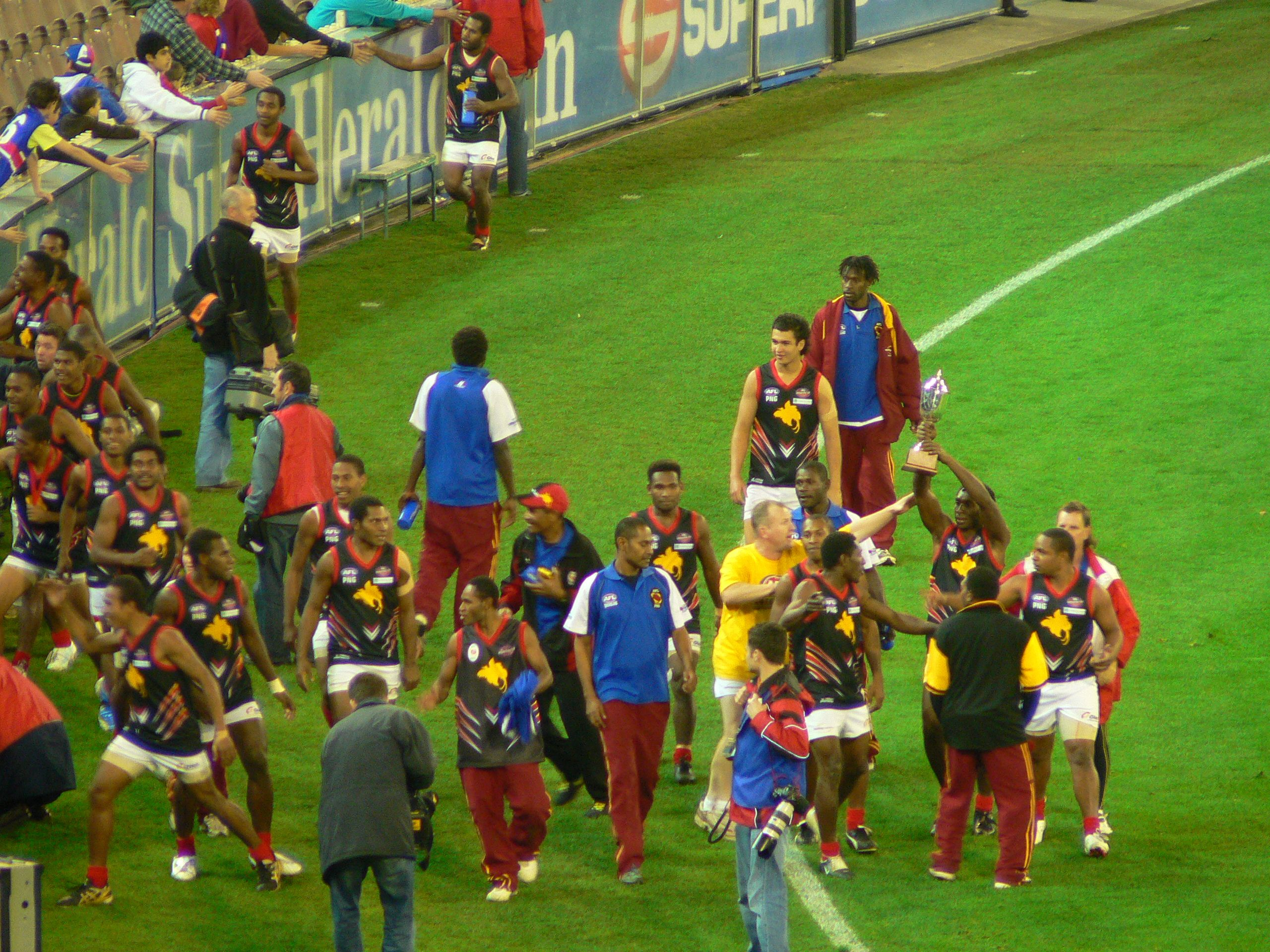
Scenes of celebration as Papua New Guinea are crowned International Australian Rules Football champions after defeating New Zealand in the 2008 Australian Football International Cup Grand Final.

Australian rules football has experienced considerable growth over the past decade, boasting the second highest number of players in the world (after Australia). Australian rules football was introduced by Australian soldiers during World War II, but has gained popularity with the introduction of players at the top level into the AFL and AFL Women's, including Mal Michael, Hewago Oea, James Gwilt, Cam Ellis-Yolmen, Aiden Bonar, Zimmorlei Farquharson and Alicia Janz.

The Papua New Guinea national Australian rules football team (The Mosquitos) were crowned International champions in 2008, by defeating the previous title holders New Zealand. They also won in 2014 and 2017, thus having more titles than any other country as of 2023. Australia is not allowed to participate.

AFL-PNG is the governing body of the sport in Papua New Guinea.

== Cricket ==
Cricket has been traditionally most popular in Papua region, where the British had the most influence.

On 8 November 2014 Papua New Guinea created history by beating Hong Kong in its first one-day international match after getting full one-day international status.

In the 2013-14 World Twenty:20 Championship, the national team, known as the Papua New Guinea Barramundis, won the East Asia-Pacific qualifying zone competition in February 2013, beating Vanuatu in the final. In the world qualifying competition in November 2013, PNG beat Kenya and the Netherlands (both significantly higher-ranked countries), but lost to tournament second-favourites Afghanistan and to Nepal and finished eighth (giving the country an implicit world Twenty20 ranking of 18th).

In January 2011, PNG finished second in World Cricket League Division 3, winning promotion to Division 2. In April they finished third in Division 2 after wins over Bermuda, Hong Kong, and Uganda. Thereby PNG ranks 19th in the world at 50-overs-a-side one-day cricket. In August 2012, PNG beat Test-playing country Zimbabwe to finish 14th in the under-19 World Cup.

In October 2019 Papua New Guinea qualified for the 2020 ICC T20 World Cup, after they won Group A of the qualifier tournament, finishing above the Netherlands on net run rate. It was the first time Papua New Guinea had qualified for a World Cup in any format.

Cricket is organised by the Papua New Guinea Cricket Board of Control, headquartered in Port Moresby.

The principal national competitions for men are the T20 Hebou Shield contest, played in April and May, and the 50-overs Hebou Shield played in May and June, competed for by six teams: a Colts team, and five organised on an "area of origin" basis - Northern Diggers, Western Hammers, Central Hearts, Southern Jets, and Central Lagoon Marlins. Each team also bears a sponsor's name.

In 2013, Hebou Western Hammers won the 50-over competition, beating BSP Central Hearts in the final. Hebou Western also won the T20 league.

The women's Hebou Shields, for 35 overs and for 20 overs leagues, were both won by Dulux Magic.

Most cricketers play in Port Moresby, particularly the Hanuabada area. There are local competitions in Lae and in Central Province. In 2013, Madang Province beat Mount Hagen in the final to win the Highlands Region Championship. Cricket is also organised in Milne Bay and Oro Provinces, and on some of the islands.

In the Trobriand Islands, cricket was introduced in 1903, by Methodist missionaries, and has become a beloved sport. Cricket has become fused with the local culture, and the game is played with stones instead of a ball and unlimited fielders.rules

== Rugby union ==
Papua New Guinea is a three tier rugby union playing nation. They began playing international rugby union in 1966, and have yet to make the Rugby World Cup. Teams from Papua New Guinea have competed in the Commonwealth Games.

There are currently 8,520 registered players and 57 clubs. There are no registered senior female players.

The national side is ranked 54th in the world (as of December 1, 2006).

== Soccer ==
Soccer is also played in Papua New Guinea. The governing body for the sport in the country is the Papua New Guinea Football Association which was established in 1962. Approximately 20,000 people play soccer in Papua New Guinea and it is considered to be a popular sport for men and the single most popular sport for females.

The national team are currently 166th in the . The country's highest ranking was 160th in June 2004. Former Australian coach Frank Farina is the current coach of the national side.

Formed in 2006, the PNG Telikom National Soccer League is the top division of Football in Papua New Guinea. The league comprises 8 semi-professional teams from across the country.

Hekari United from Port Moresby are the country's most successful club, having won the domestic league nine times (including each of the first eight seasons) and the 2009–10 OFC Champions League, which made Hekari United the first club from outside Australia and New Zealand to win the tournament. It was also the first squad from the South Pacific to qualify for the FIFA Club World Cup.

== Basketball Game rules ==
Basketball is a popular sport in Papua New Guinea, especially among the youth. Many of the country's top professional players play in Australia.

Papua New Guinea hosted the inaugural 2017 FIBA Melanesia Basketball Cup, where both the men's and the women's national teams won the titles.

== Multi-sport events ==
Papua New Guinea has competed at fifteen editions of the Commonwealth Games since 1962, winning fifteen medals in total (five gold, eight silver, two bronze).

The nation has also competed at every Summer Olympic Games since Montreal 1976, with the exception of the widely boycotted 1980 Moscow Olympics. It is yet to win a medal, and has never competed at the Winter Olympics.

Papua New Guinea has competed at six Summer Paralympic Games and no Winter Paralympic Games as of 2022, with athlete Francis Kompaon the country's only medallist, winning silver at Beijing 2008.

== Sports stadiums in Papua New Guinea ==
A minimum capacity of 5,000 is required for this list.

#	Stadium	Capacity	City	Tenants	Image
1	Sir Hubert Murray Stadium	25,000	Port Moresby	Association football: Papua New Guinea national football team	
2	Sir John Guise Stadium	15,000	Port Moresby	Association football: Papua New Guinea national football team	
3	PNG Football Stadium	14,800	Port Moresby	Rugby league: Papua New Guinea national rugby league team, Papua New Guinea Hunters, Port Moresby Vipers	

== See also ==
- Sport in Oceania
- Lists of stadiums
