= Port Moresby Australian Rules Football League =

- Current season, competition or edition: 2023
- Sport: Australian rules football
- Founded: 1955; 71 years ago
- President: Douglas Lai
- Divisions: 4
- No. of teams: 11
- Country: Papua New Guinea
- Headquarters: Port Moresby
- Most recent champions: Men's: Gerehu, Gereka; Women's: Gerehu
- Most titles: Men's: Koboni (19); Women's: Gerehu (2)
- Sponsor: Moni Plus
- Website: POMAFL

The Port Moresby Australian Football League (also known as the Port Moresby Australian Rules Football League or POM AFL) is the longest running Australian rules football league outside of Australia, founded in 1955. It is Papua New Guinea's most popular league in the sport and for a time in the 1970s shared similar prominence to the Port Moresby Rugby League competition playing to large paying crowds at Hubert Murray Stadium.

Port Moresby's Koboni Demons club (founded 1965 it is one of the longest running outside Australia), consisting mainly of players from the Central Province with 19 premierships has dominated the competition along with its major rival West (consisting of players from West New Britain).

The league since the 1980s has struggled for recognition, and following ongoing disputes with Cricket PNG over use of its grounds plays mainly out of Bisini Park Colts Oval - however due to the rapid growth of the sport in 2023 funding was allocated for its re-development to AFL standards.

The POMAFL premiership is contested by 11 clubs with senior men's (10 teams), men's reserves (10 teams), senior women's (6 teams) and junior/colts divisions.

== History ==
The league began in Port Moresby in 1955. Initially it was mostly expatriate Victorians, including many from the Warrnambool district working in Moresby at the time, whose numbers rapidly swelled the competition to 8 teams. Port Moresby was one of the founding clubs. Initially the competition maintained a low profile, with rugby league being the main sport for locals in Moresby. Despite having several clubs, other Australian Rules Football leagues in Madang and Lae were more popular. By the end of the 1960s, the Port Moresby league had shrunk to a handful of clubs consisting almost entirely of expatriates.

By 1970, a wave of interest in the sport across the country saw the Port Moresby league grow rapidly. This saw an influx of players to the national capital. With Boroko, Goroka, Elcom and PIR entering the league, it now had 6 clubs. An increase in the number of Papuans in the league saw its media profile lift considerably.

In 1972 the league played its first match at the newly developed Hubert Murray Stadium under lights. The match was a success and during the 1970s due the league's increasing popularity, it played a match of the round there at night, drawing large crowds despite charging spectators for admission. Due to the popularity of the games the league scheduled all of its matches at the stadium in 1973. During this period, the league ran A, B and C grades with most clubs fielding a side in all three grades.

In 1975 all matches were played at Boroko Sports Ground.

In 1976 the competition expanded with 3 new sides: Police, NBC and Bomana. By this time, most of the Australian expatriates had left the competition, due to the increasing standard and increased competition with Papua New Guinean nationals.

The league along with the sport across the country, reached a height in popularity in 1977 with the Grand Final that year attracting a record crowd of 6,000 paying spectators to the Hubert Murray Stadium.

Despite booming in the 1970s in the 1980s the sport in Papua New Guinea went into rapid decline following a failed restructure by Australian interests and the POMAFL came close to folding due to withdrawal of funding for the sport at senior level. The league considered radical changes to stay afloat including shifting the season to the summer months to avoid clashes with other sports, primarily rugby league.

The competition expanded to ten clubs in 2013 with the addition of 3 new teams.

Due to ongoing disputes with PNG Cricket in the 2010s, the league was restricted from utilising grounds used for cricket. Access to Amini Park for occasional finals matches was granted in the 2010s before the league had to find its own facilities.

While member clubs sell naming rights to local business sponsors the league suffered from inadequate infrastructure, relying heavily on support from Australia. Matches were played at Murray Barracks Oval before settling on its current home in 2019, the Bisini Colts Oval one of its historic homes which was in desperate need of redevelopment due to its degraded surface after funding for its redevelopment was reallocated. The league receives donations of equipment from its affiliation with AFL Queensland.

The league added a women's division in 2022. However the season was cancelled during the finals series due to controversy over player eligibility with clubs fielding star rugby players who had not played sufficient games during the season proper to qualify.

Due to the rapid growth of the sport in 2023 funding was allocated for the re-development of Bisini Park Colts Oval to AFL standards.

== Clubs ==
=== Current clubs ===
Club	Home Ground	Nickname	Founded	Years in men's competition	Premiers (Men's)	Years in women's competition	Premiers (Women's)
Koboni Australian Rules Football Club	Colts Oval Bomini Park, Port Moresby	Demons	1965	1965-	1969, 1970, 1972, 1973, 1974, 1976, 1977, 1978, 1980, 1983, 1991*, 1993, 1994, 1997, 1999*, 2009, 2015, 2018, 2022	2017-	
University of Papua New Guinea Australian Rules Football Club (known as "University")	University of Papua New Guinea Oval	Tigers (formerly Bulldogs)	1975	1975-	2002, 2004, 2005, 2006, 2008, 2012	2014-	2014
West New Britain Football Club (known simply as "West" or "Wests")		Eagles	1976	1976- (except 2009–2014)	1979, 1987, 1989, 1991*, 1995, 1996, 1999*, 2007, 2019, 2020	2021-	2023
Lamana Football Club		Dockers	1996	1996-	2003, 2005, 2007, 2014, 2017	2015-	2017, 2020
Bomana Football Club		Cats	2008	2008-	2011		
Gordons Football Club		Kokofas	2013	2013-	2016, 2023*	2015-	2019
Gerehu Football Club		Magpies	2013	2013-	2024*	2015-	2015
Gereka Football Club (began as Centrals, later Goroka)		Bombers	2013	2013-	2023*, 2024*		
Alavana Football Club	Hula, Rigo District	Swans	2020	2021-			
Port Football Club	Port Moresby Technical College	Powers	2022	2022-			
PNG Power Football Club	Hohola (PNG Power Limited)	Power	2023	2023-			

=== Former clubs ===
Club	Home Ground	Nickname	Founded-Folded	Premiers (Men's)	Notes
Port Moresby Australian Rules Football Club (known as "Moresby")	Boroko Sports Ground	Swans	1955-?	1960, 1961, 1962, 1964, 1966, 1968	Foundation club
Boroko-Badili Football Club	Boroko Sports Ground		1955-1970		Foundation club
Defence Force Australian Rules Football Club (formerly Murray Barrack Football Club)		Defence	1969	1975	
Aviat Australian Rules Football Club (Civil Aviation Agency)			1969	1971	Changed name to Rigo in 1978 and began a cricket club
Goroka Football Club			1969		
Elcom Football Club			1970		Merged with Bomana in 1978
Pacific Islands Regiment Football Club (known as "PIR")			1970		
Halagu Football Club			1974		
Police Football Club			1976		
NBC Football Club			1976		
Bomana Australian Rules Football Club		Demons	1976		Merged with Elcom in 1978
Boroko Australian Rules Football Club	Koboni Ground, Boroko	Demons	1978	1978	Formed out of the merger of Elcom and Bomana clubs
Sogeri Football Club				1963	
Collegians Football Club					
Taurauma Football Club	Taurama AFL Oval, Pari	Suns, Diggers	2013	2014	
Koki Football Club					
Laloki Football Club					
Gulf Isapeas Football Club		Giants (Isapeas)	2013		

== Men's Premiership results ==
Year	Teams	Venue	Notes
1960	Moresby		
1961	Moresby		
1962	Moresby		
1963	Sogeri def Moresby		
1964	Moresby		
1965			
1966	Moresby def Koboni		
1967			
1968	Moresby		
1969	Koboni 12.7(79) def Moresby 8.6(54)		Attendance: 3,000
1970	Koboni 8.11(59) def PIR 3.8(26)		
1971	Aviat vs Koboni		
1972	Koboni 14.10(94) def Aviat 13.10(88)		
1973	Koboni 17.17(119) def Moresby 10.2(67)		
1974	Koboni 12.4(76) def Moresby 5.4(34)		
1975	Defence 8.8(56) def Koboni 4.10(34)		
1976	Koboni 10-14(74) def Defence 9-17(71)	Hubert Murray Stadium	
1977	Koboni 9.5(69) def 6.6(42) Moresby	Hubert Murray Stadium	Attendance: 6,000
1978	Koboni 12.8(80) def Moresby 4.11(35)	Hubert Murray Stadium	
1979	West 26.20(176) def Moresby 14.16(100)	Colts Oval	
1980	Koboni def Boroko		
1981			
1982			
1983	Koboni		
1984			
1985			
1986			
1987	West		
1988			
1989	West		
1990			
1991	West drew Koboni		
1992			
1993	Koboni		
1994	Koboni		
1995	West		
1996	West		
1997	Koboni def West		
1998			
1999	West drew Koboni		Attendance: 5,000
2000			
2001			
2002	University def West		
2003	Lamana def West		
2004	University def West		
2005	Lamana def West		
2006	University 7.7(49) def Moresby 6.3(39)	Colts Oval	
2007	Lamana def West		
2008	University 11.7 (73) def Moresby 8.9(57)		
2009	University (60) def Bomana Cats (52)		
2010	Season cancelled due to dispute with PNG Cricket Board		
2011	Bomana 13.13 (91) def Lamana 5.5 (35)	Amini Park	
2012	University 8.8(56) def Gordon 3.8(26)	Amini Park	Attendance: 2,000
2013	Lamana vs Gordon	Colts Oval	
2014	Tuarama 9.5(59) def Lamana 7.11(53)	Murray Barracks Oval	
2015	Koboni 8.10(58) def Taurama 8.5(53)	Murray Barracks Oval	Attendance: 3,000
2016	Gordon 6.6(42) def Bomana 2.3(25)	Colts Oval	
2017	Lamana 9.2(56) def Koboni 7.9(51)	Colts Oval	
2018	Koboni 5.10 (40) def Lamana 3.6 (24)	Colts Oval	
2019	West 16.4(100) def Koboni 3.5(23)	Colts Oval	
2020	West (44) def Kokofa Cats (33)	Colts Oval	
2021	Season cancelled due to the COVID-19 pandemic		
2022	Koboni 4.1 (25) def West 3.3 (21)	Colts Oval	
2023	Gordons 5.6 (36) vs Gereka 5.4 (34)	Colts Oval	Tie awarded due to game being halted at half time without winner by spectator violence following an on field brawl.
2023	Gerehu 10.10 (70) vs Gereka 10.10 (70)	Colts Oval	Tie awarded

== Women's Premiership results ==
Year	Teams	Venue	Notes
2014	University		
2015	Gerehu 3.5 (23) def Lamana 2.0 (12)		
2016			
2017	Lamana 2.1 (13) def Koboni 1.3 (9)		
2018			
2019	Gordon def Lamana		
2020	Lamana def Mix Mates		
2021			
2022	Finallist not declared due to eligibility controversy		
2023	West def Lamana		
2024	Gerehu 2.1 (13) def West Eagles 1-2 (8)		

== Sponsors ==
- South Pacific Brewery (1975)
- Kellogg's, Mars (2008)
- PNG Super (2009)
- Bank of South Pacific (2011-2013)
- Esiloan (2014-2019)
- Moni Plus (2021-2023)
