= Hewago Oea =

Australian rules footballer (born 2001)

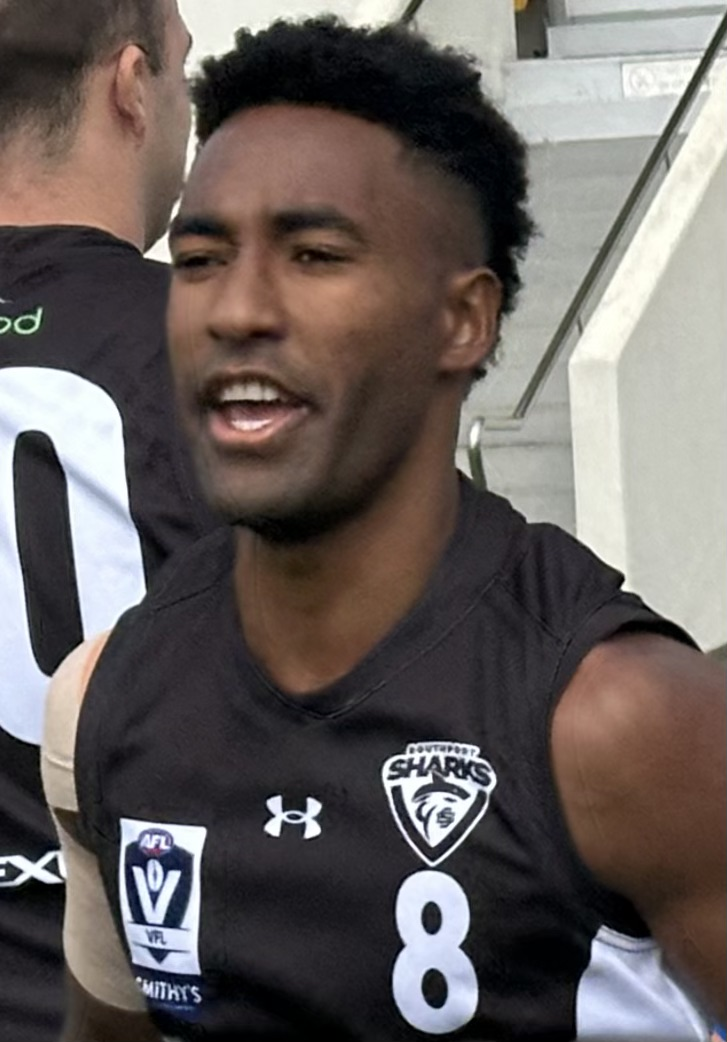
- Oea playing for Southport in 2026

Personal information
- Full name: Hewago Paul Oea
- Nickname: Ace
- Born: 13 December 2001 (age 24); Gordon, Papua New Guinea
- Original teams: Gordon Kokofas (Port Moresby AFL); Broadbeach (QAFL)
- Draft: 2020 (International Rookie)
- Debut: Round 16, 2022, Gold Coast vs. Collingwood, at Metricon Stadium
- Height: 174 cm (5 ft 9 in)
- Weight: 65 kg (143 lb)
- Position: Half-forward

Playing career
Years	Club	Games (Goals)
2022–2024	Gold Coast	13 (5)

International team honours^{2}
Years	Team	Games (Goals)
2017	Papua New Guinea	5 (6)
- ^{2} Representative statistics correct as of 2017.

Career highlights
- 2017 AFL International Cup Men's World Team; VFL premiership player: 2023; 2024 Gold Coast VFL Player of the Year

Hewago Paul Oea (born 13 December 2001) is a Papua New Guinean former professional Australian rules footballer who played for the Gold Coast Suns in the Australian Football League (AFL) and for the Papua New Guinea national team (nicknamed the "Mosquitoes").

Oea is the first locally developed Papua New Guinean and the first overseas developed player to play senior AFL.

== Early life ==
Oea was born in Gordon, Papua New Guinea the youngest of seven children to parents from the Gulf and Central provinces, mother Lala Mai and father Paul Oea. Hewago's middle name is in honour of his father, and forms part of the name he is registered under as a player in Australia.

His introduction to Australian rules was through Niukick in Port Moresby at the age of 12. An outstanding junior talent known for his fast pace, Oea played both junior and senior football with the Gordon Kokofas in the Port Moresby Australian Rules Football League. He was identified by the PNG Talent Academy's William Yogomine as a development prospect and was selected in the Papua New Guinea's Under 14 side for the Queensland State Championships. AFL South Pacific Development Manager, Ben Drew invited him to represent the South Pacific Under 16 against North Queensland in 2016, during which he was named the team's best, a feat he would repeat in 2017.

== International Cup and Gold Coast international scholarship ==
At just 15 years of age, Oea was called up to play in the senior Papua New Guinea team for the 2017 Australian Football International Cup. In the grand final he kicked a crucial goal on the half-time siren helping the side to win its 3rd cup, and was named best on ground for his effort. He also achieved All-International honours during the tournament.

Following the cup, Oea moved to Queensland to improve his chances of being drafted to the AFL, playing a handful of games at Colts level with the Broadbeach Australian Football Club on the Gold Coast where his brother Hapeo Bobogi (to the same parents) had been playing. Bobogi himself was also a Queensland Under 16 representative in 2016 and played alongside Hewago in the 2017 International Cup side however switched to rugby league in 2021.

On the Gold Coast Hewago was billeted in Australia by AFLQ Gold Coast development co-ordinator Tim Searl and his wife Chris, Oea at the time spoke very little English as it was his third language. Against the Labrador Tigers, Oea kicked 5 goals and was named among the best afield. Shortly afterward he was selected in the Queensland Under 16 team for 2017, he continued the outstanding form kicking 5 goals against Tasmania and 4 goals against the Northern Territory. Oea was selected for the AFL Academy, graduating in 2019.

Oea was signed to the Gold Coast Football Club Suns Academy in 2018 on an international scholarship giving the club first choice of him in the 2019 rookie draft, however he was overlooked in favour of gaelic footballer Luke Towey and decathlete Patrick Murtagh. Oea however achieved selection in the Allies Under 18 side that year. He competed in the 2018 QAFL grand final for Broadbeach against Palm Beach Currumbin and kicked three goals for his team that day.

The Suns selected him as a Category B rookie in the 2020 AFL Draft. He was offered a one-year contract extension, along with Murtagh, in 2021. He spent a season developing in the Suns' NEAFL side including a Rising Star nomination in Round 6. For his NEAFL performances, he was elevated to the club's Category B rookie list. He spent the first half of 2022 playing in the Suns' VFL side as a small forward. Following consistent form in the VFL and a 3-goal game against Collingwood, Oea was called up to the senior side, initially as an emergency, then elevated to the interchange replacing Chris Burgess in the side due to the prevailing wet conditions.

== AFL career ==
Oea scored a goal with his first kick and with limited on-field time went on to gain six possessions and assist in Gold Coast goals in a successful debut, though the Suns lost narrowly. He kicked another goal in his second game, however suffered a dislocated finger during after the siren celebrations after teammate Noah Anderson's after the siren winning goal.

Oea failed to break through for a senior game in 2024, but was rewarded for his performance's in the club's reserve team with the VFL Player of the Year award.

Oea was delisted by the Suns at the end of the 2024 season; however, he was offered a train-on place with the club over the pre-season to try to earn a spot back on the club's playing list through the Supplemental Selection Period (SSP).

== Statistics ==
Statistics are correct to the end of 2024

Legend
G	Goals	K	Kicks	D	Disposals	T	Tackles
B	Behinds	H	Handballs	M	Marks

Season	Team	No.	Games	Totals							Averages (per game)						
Season	Team	No.	Games	G	B	K	H	D	M	T	G	B	K	H	D	M	T
2021	Gold Coast	47	0	–	–	–	–	–	–	–	–	–	–	–	–	–	–
2022	Gold Coast	47	5	2	0	17	10	27	6	14	0.4	0.0	3.4	2.0	5.4	1.2	2.8
2023	Gold Coast	47	8	3	1	41	30	71	11	20	0.4	0.1	5.1	3.8	8.9	1.4	2.5
2024	Gold Coast	47	0	–	–	–	–	–	–	–	–	–	–	–	–	–	–
Career			13	5	1	58	40	98	17	34	0.4	0.1	4.5	3.1	7.5	1.3	2.6
