= PNG Rules Football Council =

- Formation: 1978
- Type: Sports Governing Body
- Region served: Papua New Guinea
- Parent organization: AFL Commission

The PNG Rules Football Council is the governing body for the sport of Australian rules football in Papua New Guinea.

It works closely with AFL PNG, the development body, as well as the Australian Football League.

== See also ==
- Australian rules football in Papua New Guinea
- List of Australian rules football leagues outside Australia
