= Ken Onley =

Australian rules footballer, born 1914

Personal information
- Full name: Kenneth Onley
- Born: 14 December 1914; Gapsted, Victoria
- Died: 23 August 1981 (aged 66); Prahran, Victoria

Playing career^{1}
Years	Club	Games (Goals)
1934	Hawthorn	3 (1)
- ^{1} Playing statistics correct to the end of 1934.

Kenneth Onley (14 December 1914 – 23 August 1981) was an Australian rules footballer who played with Hawthorn in the Victorian Football League (VFL).

Onley later served in the Australian Army during World War II, being Mentioned in Despatches in 1945 for distinguished service in the South-West Pacific.
