= AFL PNG =

AFL Papua New Guinea
- Formation: 2001
- Type: Sports Development Body
- Region served: Papua New Guinea
- Parent organization: PNG Rules Football Council

AFL PNG is the peak promotional body for the sport of Australian rules football in Papua New Guinea.

AFL PNG organises the national championships tournament and selects the national team, the Mosquitos.

The governing body is the PNG Rules Football Council.

An affiliation is currently in place with AFL Queensland, with scholarships for players and representative side competing in Queensland competitions.

== See also ==
- Australian rules football in Papua New Guinea
- List of Australian rules football leagues outside Australia
