= AFL Queensland =

Australian rules football governing body

- Sport: Australian rules football
- Jurisdiction: Queensland
- Founded: 2000
- Regional affiliation: AFL
- Headquarters: Yeronga
- Chairperson: Trisha Squires (Head of AFLQ)

Official website
- www.aflq.com.au
- (Australia)

AFL Queensland Limited (AFLQ) is the governing body of Australian rules football in the state of Queensland, formed in 2000.

== History ==
Previous Australian rules governing bodies in Queensland include:

- Brisbane Football Club, which governed the code between 1870 until it deferred governance to the VFA in 1877
- Victorian Football Association (1877–1880; later known as Victorian Association)
- Queensland Football Association (1880–1890), which governed the code and its regional associations as an affiliate of the Victorian Football Association
- Queensland Football League (QFL) (1903–1996), also known as the Queensland Australian National Football League (QANFL) and Queensland Australian Football League (QAFL)
- Queensland Australian Football Council (1997–1999), which oversaw the Queensland State Football League (QSFL)

In 1999 the Queensland State Football League, which previously oversaw Queensland's competition, went into voluntary liquidation and the Queensland Australian Football Council was dissolved. A new governing body, AFL Queensland Limited, was founded in 2000, adopting the AFL brand due to formally affiliating with the AFL Commission in Melbourne.

== Representative Side ==
The "Queensland Scorpions" are the state representative side and include under 16s, under 18s and open age groups and compete at the AFL Under 18 Championships and other state championships.

The "Country Kookaburras" represent the regional areas outside of South East Queensland, have under 14's, 16s, under 18s and open age groups and compete at the Australian Country Championships.

Due to the 2005 alignment with AFL PNG, both sides can also include players from Papua New Guinea.

== Location and description ==
AFLQ is the governing body of Australian rules football in Queensland. Its offices are based at Leyshon Park in the Brisbane suburb of Yeronga. AFL Queensland has over 216,000 participants (including Northern Rivers which is governed by AFLQ) playing at all levels of football from the introductory NAB AFL Auskick program to the AFL Masters Competition. AFL Queensland covers 13 regions, 24 leagues and 159 clubs.

As of 2023 Trisha Squires led AFLQ, while Dean Warren was chair.

== Grogan Medal ==
The Grogan Medal is awarded to the best and fairest in home and away rounds of each season's competition.

A best and fairest for the league has been awarded since 1946. Before it became a medal in 1947 and 1948, it was a trophy donated by Col Loel and Mick Byles, known as the "Col Loel-Mick Byles" trophy. It was awarded to Kedron's Erwin Dornau in 1947, and Coorparoo's T. Calder in 1948 before being replaced by the Grogan Medal in 1949.

== Queensland Football Hall of Fame ==
The Queensland Football Hall of Fame was established in 2008, the code's 150th anniversary. It aims to recognise "players, coaches, administrators, volunteers, teams, media, and venues that have made a most significant contribution to the game of Australian football in the state". The inaugural event named 150 people, which included seven "Legends" of the game: Arthur Collinson (administrator and umpire), Jason Dunstall, Harry O'Callaghan (player, coach, administrator and umpire), Michael Voss, Leigh Matthews, Tom McArthur (umpire), and Dick Verdon (champion full-back who played with Sandgate and Coorparoo; captained and coached the state.

The inductions continued until 2016, although without ceremonies. The event was revived in 2023, when 86 people were inducted into the Queensland Football Hall of Fame, and eight current inductees elevated to Legend status.

== Queensland Team of the 20th Century ==
On 16 June 2003, the Queensland Team of the 20th Century was announced at a gala function staged by AFLQ at the Brisbane Convention Centre.

The Team of the 20th Century is selected from the best home-grown talent and read as follows:

Backs:	Marcus Ashcroft	Dick Verdon	Wayne Stewart
Half Backs:	Gavin Crosisca	Don Smith	Zane Taylor
Centres:	Scott McIvor	Doug Pittard	Des Hughes
Half Forwards:	John Stackpoole	Dick Parton	Barry Clarke
Forwards:	Ray Hughson	Jason Dunstall (vc)	Owen Backwell
Followers:	Ken Grimley	Michael Voss (c)	Jason Akermanis
Interchange:	Keith Leach	Alex McGill	Noel McGuinness
	Mal Michael	Gordon Phelan	Clem Ryan

Coach of the Century: Norm Dare

Umpire of the Century: Tom McArthur

== Affiliated Leagues ==
=== Premier South East Queensland leagues ===
The highest grades of men's and women's Queensland community football are/were:

- QAFL (1903–present)
- QAFLW (2001–present)

=== Developmental Leagues ===
- Queensland Football Association (QFA)

=== Interschool Competitions ===
- AFL Queensland Schools Cup (2016-present)

=== Regional AFL Queensland leagues ===
- AFL Cairns (1956–present)
- AFL Capricornia (1969–present)
- AFL Darling Downs (1971–present)
- AFL Mackay (1970–present)
- AFL Mount Isa (1967–present)
- AFL Townsville (1955–present)
- AFL Wide Bay (1987–present)
- AFL Cape York (1992–present)

All regions include their own affiliated junior leagues.

=== Foreign AFL Queensland leagues ===
- AFL Fiji
- AFL Nauru
- (Papua New Guinea) AFL PNG
- AFL Solomon Islands
- AFL Vanuatu

== See also ==
- List of Australian rules football leagues in Australia
- Australian Rules football in Queensland

== Sources ==
1. The Brisbane Courier 1903 to 1933, weekly match reports and articles
2. The Daily Mail 1903 to 1914, weekly match reports and articles
3. Saturday Sports Observer 1903 to 1912, weekly match reports and articles
4. John Morton's Queensland Australian Rules Year Book 1960 by John Morton, 1960
5. Queensland Team of the Century Football Record Official Programme, AFL Queensland, 2003
