= Tom McArthur (umpire) =

Australian rules football field umpire (1937–2018)

- Born: 30 June 1937
- Died: 15 June 2018 (aged 80)
- Occupation: Australian rules football field umpire
- Years active: 1959–1985
- Known for: umpired a record 502 senior games
- Awards: Queensland Umpire of the Century, Australian Football Hall of Fame

Tom McArthur (30 June 1937 – 15 June 2018) was an Australian rules football field umpire in the Queensland Australian Football League. He umpired 502 senior games from 1959 to 1985, which was a national record until broken by AFL Sydney umpire Frank Kalayzich in 2015 (and subsequently broken by WAFL and AFL umpire Brett Rosebury in 2022).

== Honours ==
In 2003, McArthur was named Queensland Umpire of the Century when the Queensland Team of the Century was announced.

McArthur was inducted into the Australian Football Hall of Fame in 2008.

He was inducted as one of seven inaugural Legends in the Queensland Australian Football Hall of Fame in 2008.
