= James Gwilt =

Australian rules footballer, born 1986

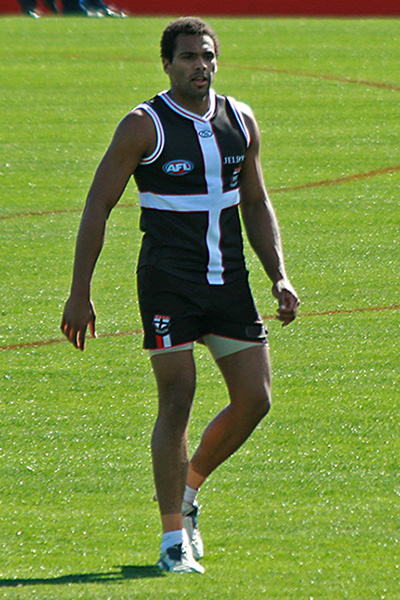
- Gwilt at St Kilda training in 2009

Personal information
- Full name: James Gwilt
- Born: 11 August 1986 (age 40); Darwin, Australia
- Original team: Noble Park (EFL)
- Draft: No. 63, 2004 national draft
- Height: 188 cm (6 ft 2 in)
- Weight: 94 kg (207 lb)
- Position: Defender

Playing career^{1}
Years	Club	Games (Goals)
2005–2014	St Kilda	126 (25)
2015–2016	Essendon	26 (0)
Total		152 (25)
- ^{1} Playing statistics correct to the end of 2016.

James Gwilt (born 11 August 1986) is a former professional Australian rules footballer who played with the St Kilda Football Club and the Essendon Football Club in the Australian Football League (AFL).

== Early life ==
Gwilt's mother is from Papua New Guinea and his father, Jason, is of Welsh descent and immigrated with his parents and siblings from Crowle (Worcestershire) in England to Australia in the late 1950s. Jason Gwilt played Australian rules football in Port Moresby.

Gwilt began his football in suburban football instead of participating in the TAC Cup, Victoria's premier under-18 competition. He played for Noble Park in the Eastern Football League and was best on ground in the league's grand final in 2004. He was also a talented junior cricketer, and played for the South Melbourne Cricket Club first XI in premier cricket during the 2003–04 season.

== AFL career ==
St Kilda made a surprising pick in the 2004 AFL National Draft by selecting Gwilt in the 4th Round, the first player selected from a suburban league for five years. He made his debut in the final round of the 2005 AFL season, against the Brisbane Lions at Telstra Dome, as a late replacement for Fraser Gehrig in a match where the Saints won by a club-record 139 points and small forward Stephen Milne kicked eleven goals. At debut he was only one of two AFL players (the other being Mal Michael) to have a Papua New Guinean parent.

Gwilt played in the 2005 AFL finals series, impressing with two goals against Adelaide in a qualifying final win at Football Park (AAMI Stadium) in Adelaide.

Gwilt spent most of 2006 playing with St Kilda's then VFL affiliate team, the Casey Scorpions. He returned with a total of eight games in 2007, with his best being a 21 possession game against Carlton at Docklands Stadium. He was nominated for the AFL's Army Award in Round 11 of that year. Gwilt struggled for opportunities early in 2008 but returned to the senior side in Round 11. He enjoyed better form after being played as a forward, including a good performance in St Kilda's 2008 semifinal win against Collingwood.

Gwilt played in 15 of 22 matches in the 2009 season home and away rounds in which St Kilda qualified in first position for the finals, winning the club's third minor premiership.

Gwilt played 26 games in 2010, including four final matches, and finished 8th in St Kilda's best & fairest award (Trevor Barker Medal). This was the year that Gwilt entrenched himself inside St Kilda's best 22, as shown by his high finish in St Kilda's best & fairest award. Prior to 2010 he was considered a fringe player.

Gwilt played as a cog in St Kilda's defence until the end of 2014, where, despite a 10th-place finish in the club's best and fairest, he was delisted as part of the club's youth policy. He was then picked up by Essendon as a free agent. At the end of the 2016 season, he was informed his contract would not be renewed for 2017.

== Statistics ==
Legend
G	Goals	K	Kicks	D	Disposals	T	Tackles
B	Behinds	H	Handballs	M	Marks

Season	Team	No.	Games	Totals							Averages (per game)						
Season	Team	No.	Games	G	B	K	H	D	M	T	G	B	K	H	D	M	T
2005	St Kilda	33	3	2	2	25	6	31	10	5	0.7	0.7	8.3	2.0	10.3	3.3	1.7
2006	St Kilda	33	2	0	0	5	12	17	2	8	0.0	0.0	2.5	6.0	8.5	1.0	4.0
2007	St Kilda	33	8	1	0	82	33	115	44	11	0.1	0.0	10.3	4.1	14.4	5.5	1.4
2008	St Kilda	33	13	3	3	84	67	151	51	24	0.2	0.2	6.5	5.2	11.6	3.9	1.8
2009	St Kilda	33	15	8	6	97	98	195	55	40	0.5	0.4	6.5	6.5	13.0	3.7	2.7
2010	St Kilda	33	26	5	1	336	174	510	151	40	0.2	0.0	12.9	6.7	19.6	5.8	1.5
2011	St Kilda	33	15	0	0	201	82	283	82	18	0.0	0.0	13.4	5.5	18.9	5.5	1.2
2012	St Kilda	33	14	0	1	143	63	206	44	21	0.0	0.1	10.2	4.5	14.7	3.1	1.5
2013	St Kilda	33	13	0	0	119	75	194	54	14	0.0	0.0	9.2	5.8	14.9	4.2	1.1
2014	St Kilda	33	17	6	2	190	85	275	108	35	0.4	0.1	11.2	5.0	16.2	6.4	2.1
2015	Essendon	42	11	0	1	123	80	203	59	17	0.0	0.1	11.2	7.3	18.5	5.4	1.5
2016	Essendon	42	15	0	0	185	104	289	93	23	0.0	0.0	12.3	6.9	19.3	6.2	1.5
Career			152	25	16	1590	879	2469	753	256	0.2	0.1	10.5	5.8	16.2	5.0	1.7
