= Mal Michael =

Australian rules footballer, born 1977

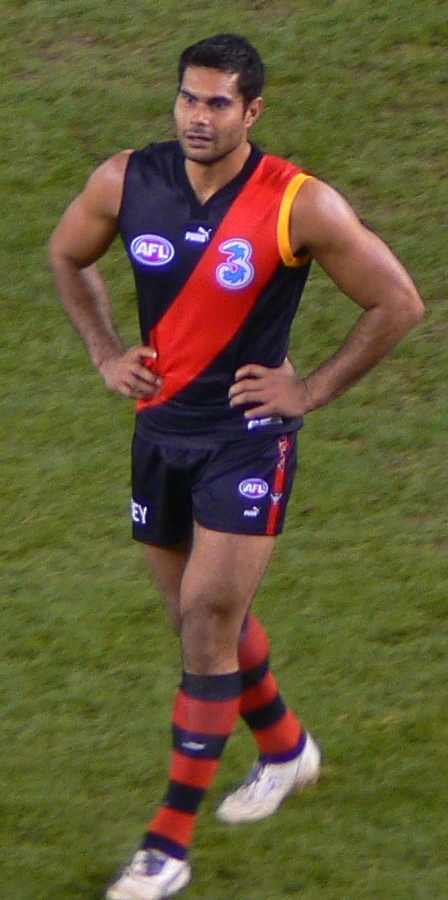
- Michael with Essendon in 2007

Personal information
- Full name: Malcolm Robert Michael
- Born: 24 June 1977 (age 49); Port Moresby, Papua New Guinea
- Original team: Kenmore Bears Jnr AFL Club (BJAFL) / Morningside (QAFL)
- Draft: 1996 Rookie Draft, Collingwood #2, 2006 Pre-season Draft, Essendon
- Height: 190 cm (6 ft 3 in)
- Weight: 100 kg (220 lb)
- Position: Defender

Playing career^{1}
Years	Club	Games (Goals)
1997–2000	Collingwood	61 (23)
2001–2006	Brisbane Lions	140 (5)
2007–2008	Essendon	37 (5)
Total		238 (33)

International team honours
Years	Team	Games (Goals)
2004	Australia	2
- ^{1} Playing statistics correct to the end of 2008.

Career highlights
- 3× AFL premiership player 2001, 2002, 2003; AFL Rising Star nominee: 1997; Harry Collier Trophy 1997

Malcolm Robert Michael (born 24 June 1977) is a Papua New Guinean-born former Australian rules footballer who played 238 games in the Australian Football League with Collingwood, Essendon and the Brisbane Lions, including three premierships playing at full-back for the Lions. Michael is recognised as being one of the best Queensland produced Australian rules footballers of all time, being named on the AFL Queensland Team of the 20th Century.

He is possibly the only Australian rules footballer who is better known in a country other than Australia, maintaining a high profile in Papua New Guinea, and he is credited by many to have inspired the boom in playing numbers of Australian rules football in Papua New Guinea. In April 2009, The Guardian described him as one of Papua New Guinea's "living national icons", along with politician Michael Somare and philosopher Bernard Narokobi.

== Early life ==
Michael was born in Papua New Guinea. His mother, Alice, is from Delena, Central Province, in Papua New Guinea. His father, Peter, is a Melbourne-born civil engineer who moved to Papua New Guinea in the 1970s and founded the Bomana Football Club. The family moved to Brisbane when Michael was 3-years-old. He played junior football with the Kenmore Bears and attended Kenmore South State School and St Peters Lutheran College.

As a teenager, Michael was recruited by Queensland Australian Football League club Morningside. While at that club he was invited to train with the Brisbane Bears Australian Football League (AFL) club, with a view to potentially drafting him. He was later drafted by Collingwood to their rookie list in 1996.

== AFL career ==
=== Collingwood Football Club ===
Michael debuted in 1997 as the first player in the AFL to be elevated to the seniors from the rookie list. He finished eighth in the club champion voting and earned a Norwich Rising Star Award nomination.

In 1999, Michael was notable as being the full-back playing on Sydney Swans champion full-forward Tony Lockett, in the match when Lockett kicked his 1300th career goal to become the highest goalkicker in the league's history.

Michael managed 61 games with the Magpies but battled through injuries in his four seasons at the club. At the end of 2000 he was traded to the Brisbane Lions along with a draft pick for Jarrod Molloy.

=== Brisbane Lions ===
Michael debuted for the Brisbane Lions in 2001. He played fullback in each of the Lions' three successive premierships in 2001, 2002 and 2003. Michael played 140 out of a possible 145 games for the Lions during his six years with the club, as well as all pre-season competition games and two International rules series games against Ireland in 2004.

In 2005, Michael was involved in a much publicised incident with Nick Riewoldt when he and Chris Scott both "tested" the St Kilda player's broken collarbone. The incident caused significant controversy. A fortnight later, he played his 100th game for the Lions in a six-point loss to eventual premiers Sydney.

In Round 14 of the 2006 season against Melbourne, Michael conceded a notable deliberate rushed behind with a kick between the goal posts of the opposition from over 10 metres out. This drew significant media attention and was frequently replayed.

Michael played his 200th AFL game in the penultimate round of the 2006 AFL season against Sydney, lining up on Barry Hall, who was also playing his 200th AFL game. Brisbane lost the match by 57 points.

Michael announced his retirement on 5 October 2006 at only 29 years of age.

=== Essendon Football Club ===
On 24 November 2006, Michael came out of retirement and signed with the Essendon Football Club, reaching an agreement to be selected by them in the pre-season draft for the 2007 season. Michael played for Essendon in the 2007 and 2008 seasons.

On 15 August 2008, Michael announced he would retire at the season's end. In the Round 22 match, Essendon vs St Kilda, Michael was chaired off the ground by teammates at the end of the match.

== Statistics ==
Legend
G	Goals	K	Kicks	D	Disposals	T	Tackles
B	Behinds	H	Handballs	M	Marks

Season	Team	No.	Games	Totals							Averages (per game)						
Season	Team	No.	Games	G	B	K	H	D	M	T	G	B	K	H	D	M	T
1997	Collingwood	48	13	0	2	46	54	100	29	26	0.0	0.2	3.5	4.2	7.7	2.2	2.0
1998	Collingwood	48	16	3	2	84	79	163	42	19	0.2	0.1	5.3	4.9	10.2	2.6	1.2
1999	Collingwood	48	17	6	5	94	107	201	73	19	0.4	0.3	5.5	6.3	11.8	4.3	1.1
2000	Collingwood	48	15	14	8	75	80	155	67	17	0.9	0.5	5.0	5.3	10.3	4.5	1.1
2001†	Brisbane Lions	15	24	2	3	89	119	208	64	23	0.1	0.1	3.7	5.0	8.7	2.7	1.0
2002†	Brisbane Lions	15	25	1	1	120	106	226	80	32	0.0	0.0	4.8	4.2	9.0	3.2	1.3
2003†	Brisbane Lions	15	23	0	2	119	79	198	91	21	0.0	0.1	5.2	3.4	8.6	4.0	0.9
2004	Brisbane Lions	15	25	0	0	138	86	224	80	36	0.0	0.0	5.5	3.4	9.0	3.2	1.4
2005	Brisbane Lions	15	22	1	0	131	65	196	84	24	0.0	0.0	6.0	3.0	8.9	3.8	1.1
2006	Brisbane Lions	15	21	1	2	139	101	240	109	30	0.0	0.1	6.6	4.8	11.4	5.2	1.4
2007	Essendon	22	22	2	1	111	142	253	82	31	0.1	0.0	5.0	6.5	11.5	3.7	1.4
2008	Essendon	22	15	3	1	58	102	160	49	16	0.2	0.1	3.9	6.8	10.7	3.3	1.1
Career			238	33	27	1204	1120	2324	850	294	0.1	0.1	5.1	4.7	9.8	3.6	1.2

== Post AFL ==
Following his AFL career, Michael made a switch to semi-professional country football, playing with Nilma Darnum Bombers in the Ellinbank and District Football League. The club broke a 14-year finals drought in 2009 to win the premiership.

At the end of 2009, Michael coached a combined Under 23 Pacific Islands team to victory against an Under 23 North Queensland representative side.

In 2010, Michael was appointed caretaker coach of the Papua New Guinea National Senior Team, before representing the team as a player in the pre-season campaign against AFL Cairns clubs. He played for Heywood in the Western Border Football League that year.

In 2015, Michael played for Ormond in the VAFA, helping to take the club to the grand final.

== Papua New Guinean celebrity ==
Michael was the first Papua New Guinean to play senior AFL football, acting as an ambassador for the game when he visits his homeland. He is possibly the only AFL player who is better known in a country other than Australia. He has appeared on a series of biscuit commercials in PNG as "the secret of Mal's success". In 2004, he hosted a popular football segment on a weekly PNG television show.

In early 2006, he established the Mal Michael Foundation, aimed at raising money to help give young Papua New Guineans the opportunity to play Aussie rules.

In 2007 Michael made a strategic deal with mining company Hannans Reward (ASX:HNR) aimed at appealing the company to the Papua New Guinea market. Michael's consultancy company M&M Synergy Ltd, deals in the natural resource sector in Papua New Guinea. They represent land owner incorporated companies to help them develop their assets. M&M Synergy Ltd specialise in joint venture projects and capital raising for timber, mining and petroleum projects.

== Career highlights ==
- Brisbane Lions premiership side 2001, 2002, 2003
- AFL Queensland Team of the Century 2003
- Rushing a behind in Round 14, 2006
- International Rules series 2004 Goalkeeper
- Brisbane Lions Team of the (first) Decade 2006

== See also ==
- Australian rules football in Papua New Guinea
