= Patrick Murtagh =

Australian American football player (born 2000)

- Born: 11 February 2000 (age 26); Gold Coast, Queensland, Australia
- Football career

Profile
- Position: Tight end

Personal information
- Listed height: 6 ft 6 in (1.98 m)
- Listed weight: 250 lb (113 kg)

Career information
- High school: The Southport School; Gold Coast, Queensland, Australia
- NFL draft: 2023: undrafted

Career history
- Detroit Lions (2023)*; Jacksonville Jaguars (2024)*; Denver Broncos (2025)*
- * Offseason or practice squad member only
- Stats at Pro Football Reference
Australian rules football career
Personal information
- Original team: Labrador (QAFL) / Gold Coast Suns Academy (Talent League)
- Position: Ruck / Key Forward / Key Defender
Playing career
Years	Club	Games (Goals)
2020–2022	Gold Coast	0 (0)

Patrick Murtagh (murr-TAH; born 11 February 2000) is an Australian professional American football tight end and a former professional Australian rules footballer for the Gold Coast Suns in the Australian Football League (AFL). He joined the Jacksonville Jaguars through the International Player Pathway Program (IPPP) in 2024.

== Early life ==
Murtagh was born in Queensland to an Australian father and a mother from Papua New Guinea. He attended The Southport School throughout his upbringing and was a national-level decathlete as well as a Queensland state champion. He was also awarded a place on Australia’s Commonwealth pathway, a program run by the Australian government designed to subsidise college tuition, before he instead decided to pursue a professional career in Australian rules football.

== Australian rules football career ==
At 18 years of age, Murtagh switched sports and began playing Australian rules football for the Labrador Tigers in the semi-professional QAFL state league and worked his way through the club ranks before making his senior debut for the Labrador in June 2019. He was also invited to take part in the Gold Coast Suns Academy, which would lead to being drafted by his hometown professional AFL team the Gold Coast Suns as a Queensland Academy zone selection at the 2019 AFL draft.

Murtagh was placed on the Suns rookie list and played 28 games for their developmental VFL team over his three-year stint with the club, which was highlighted by a preliminary final appearance against crosstown rivals the Southport Sharks. Throughout his Australian rules football career he played in the positions of ruck, key forward and key defender. He was delisted in September 2022 without playing a top level AFL game.

== American football career ==
In 2023, Murtagh joined the NFL International Player Pathway as a tight end.

=== Detroit Lions ===
On 4 May 2023, Murtagh was allocated to the Detroit Lions, but had to step down on 22 May due to a medical issue.

=== Jacksonville Jaguars ===
Murtagh was signed as an undrafted free agent by the Jacksonville Jaguars on 15 April 2024. He was waived/injured on 27 August.

The Jaguars announced they had waived Murtagh on May 15, 2025.

=== Denver Broncos ===
On August 28, 2025, Murtagh was signed to the Denver Broncos' practice squad.He remained with the team through the conclusion of the 2025 season, when his contract was permitted to expire without a future/reserve contract offer.

=== Post-football career (2026–present) ===
Following his departure from the NFL, Murtagh returned to Australia. On May 26, 2026, he announced that he had obtained his real estate license and joined Orval Real Estate, a boutique property agency operating on the Gold Coast, Queensland.

Alongside his professional career in real estate, Murtagh returned to Australian rules football, signing to play with the Redland-Victoria Point Sharks in the Queensland Australian Football League (QAFL).

== Personal life ==
Murtagh is the son of Michael and Vala Murtagh. He lost his father to cancer in 2021.
