= Aiden Bonar =

Australian rules footballer (born 1999)

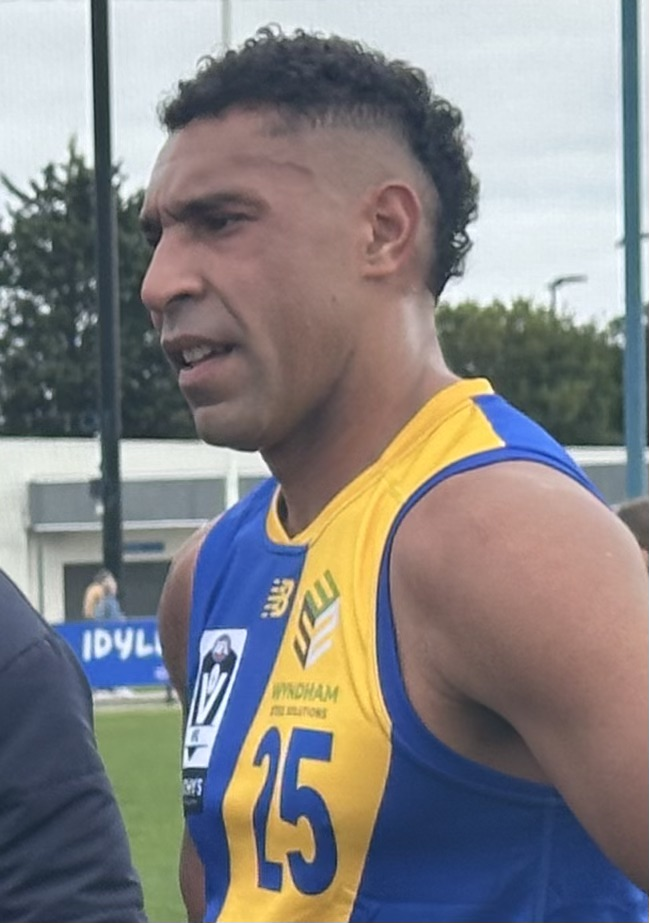
- Bonar playing for Williamstown in 2026

Personal information
- Born: 8 March 1999 (age 27); Frankston, Australia
- Original team: Dandenong Stingrays (TAC Cup)
- Draft: No. 11, 2017 national draft
- Debut: 5 August 2018, Greater Western Sydney vs. Carlton, at Docklands Stadium
- Height: 188 cm (6 ft 2 in)
- Weight: 87 kg (192 lb)
- Position: Defender

Club information
- Current club: Williamstown
- Number: 25

Playing career
Years	Club	Games (Goals)
2018–2019	Greater Western Sydney	6 (5)
2020–2023	North Melbourne	28 (0)
Total		34 (5)

Aiden Bonar (born 8 March 1999) is a professional Australian rules footballer playing for the Williamstown Football Club in the Victorian Football League (VFL).

He made his debut for the Greater Western Sydney Giants in round 20 of the 2018 AFL season, scoring two goals in the 105-point win against Carlton at Docklands Stadium. At the conclusion of the 2019 season, he was traded to North Melbourne. On 20 October 2023 North Melbourne delisted him.

Aiden's mother was born and raised in Papua New Guinea and his Scottish father met her while working there.

He played junior football at Seaford Tigers and Haileybury.

Bonar was delisted from the North Melbourne Football Club in October 2023.

== Statistics ==
Statistics are correct to the end of the 2019 season

Legend
G	Goals	K	Kicks	D	Disposals	T	Tackles
B	Behinds	H	Handballs	M	Marks

Season	Team	No.	Games	Totals							Averages (per game)						
Season	Team	No.	Games	G	B	K	H	D	M	T	G	B	K	H	D	M	T
2018	Greater Western Sydney	10	4	5	2	19	23	42	12	18	1.3	0.5	4.8	5.8	10.5	3.0	4.5
2019	Greater Western Sydney	10	2	0	0	11	8	19	5	5	0.0	0.0	5.5	4.0	9.5	2.5	2.5
Career			6	5	2	30	31	61	17	23	0.8	0.3	5.0	5.2	10.2	2.8	3.8
