= Alicia Janz =

Australian rules footballer (born 1990)

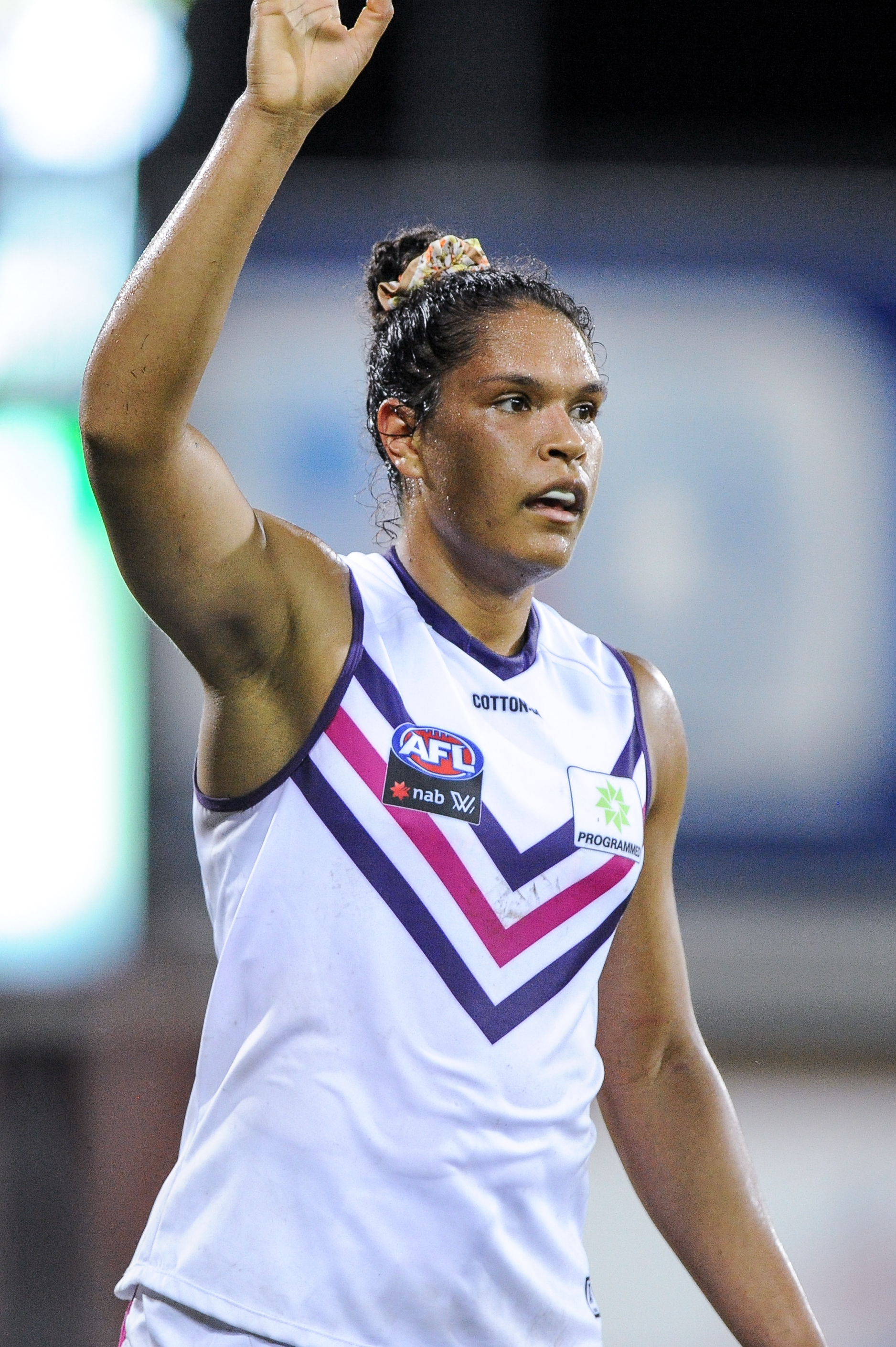
- Janz playing for Fremantle in January 2018

Personal information
- Born: 25 May 1990 (age 36); Katherine, Northern Territory
- Original team: Swan Districts (WAWFL)
- Debut: Round 4, 2017, Fremantle vs. Adelaide, at Fremantle Oval
- Height: 177 cm (5 ft 10 in)
- Position: Ruck

Playing career^{1}
Years	Club	Games (Goals)
2017–2019	Fremantle	14 (0)
2020–2021	West Coast	6 (0)
Total		20 (0)
- ^{1} Playing statistics correct to the end of the 2021 season.

Alicia Janz (born 25 May 1990) is a former Australian rules football and netball player who played in the AFL Women's competition and ANZ Championship.

== Early life ==
Janz was born in Katherine, Northern Territory to a Papua New Guinean and Torres Strait Islander mother and Australian father. She is of Meriam Mer ancestry. Janz was raised in Derby, Western Australia where she was first introduced to Australian rules football, playing informally with other locals. She attended Methodist Ladies' College, Perth.

Janz played netball for both West Coast Fever and Western Sting. It wasn't until she moved to Melbourne in 2014 that she switched from netball to playing with the Darebin Falcons in the VWFL before moving back to Perth and playing with Swan Districts in the WAWFL.

== AFLW career ==
Janz was recruited by Fremantle as an injury replacement player during the 2017 season. She made her debut in the one point loss to Collingwood at Rushton Park in round five of the 2017 season. She played every match after her debut game to finish with three matches for the season. She was delisted at the end of the 2017 season. She returned to Fremantle's list in October through the 2017 AFL Women's draft.

In April 2019, Janz joining cross-town rivals West Coast for their inaugural season. Janz was delisted by the Eagles on 9 June 2021, after playing 6 games with the team throughout her career.
