= Sir Hubert Murray Stadium =

Multi-sports stadium in Papua New Guinea

Sir Hubert Murray Stadium of PNG kantri
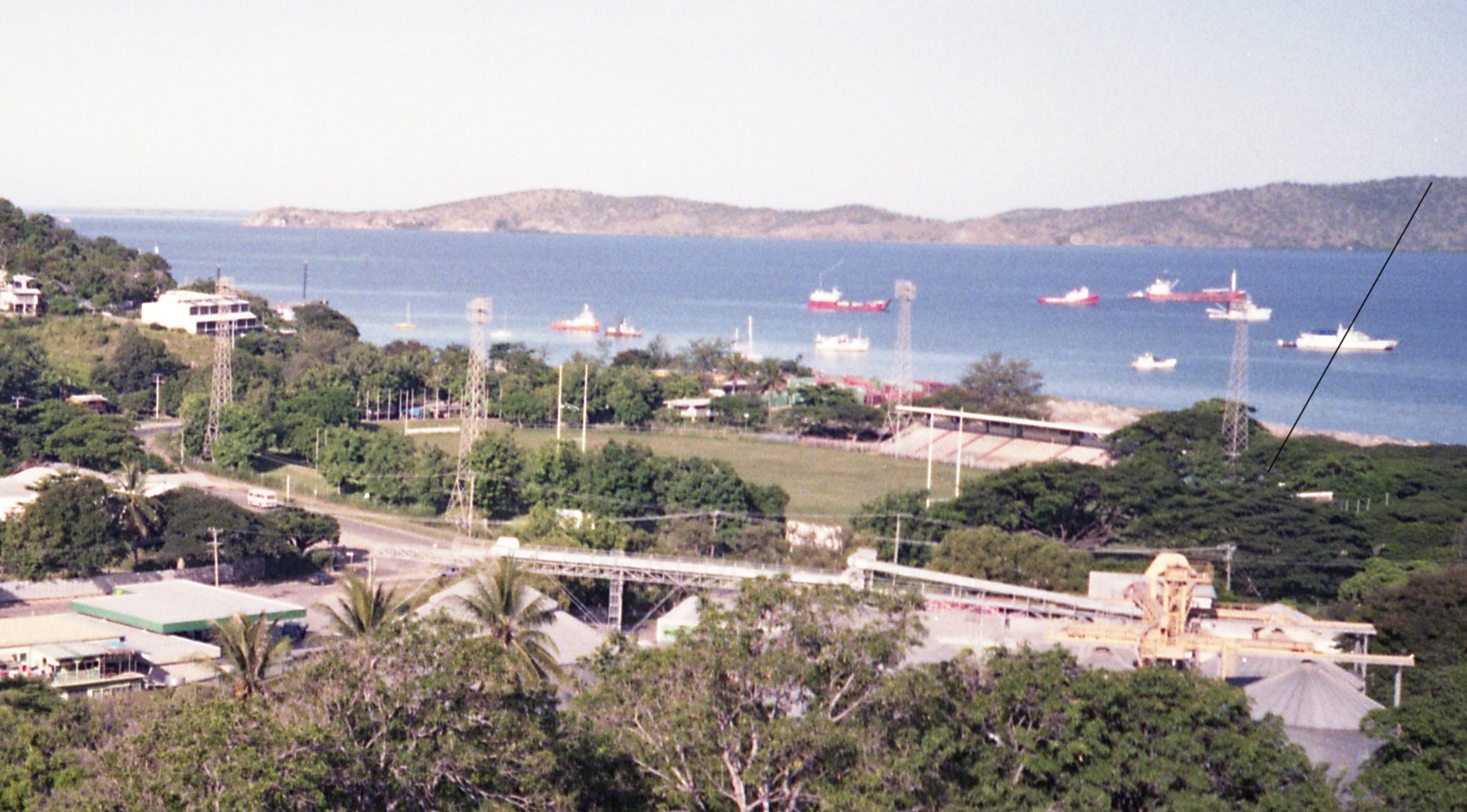
- The stadium in March 1993
- Interactive map of Sir Hubert Murray Stadium of PNG kantri
- Location: Port Moresby, Papua New Guinea
- Coordinates: 9°27′59″S 147°09′24″E
- Capacity: 20,000
- Surface: Grass

Construction
- Opened: 1969
- Renovated: 2013–14

Tenants
- Papua New Guinea national football team Port Moresby Vipers (PNGNRL)

The Hubert Murray Stadium is a sports venue located in Port Moresby, the capital city of Papua New Guinea. It was developed for the 1969 South Pacific Games on reclaimed land at Konedobu that had previously been shoreline mangroves. The athletics events and the opening and closing ceremonies were held at the new stadium, which was named after Sir Hubert Murray, a former lieutenant governor.

With an initial capacity of approximately 15,000 spectators, it was used for Australian football, soccer and school athletic events after the 1969 games. A redeveloped rectangular format was opened in 2022 after a redevelopment stalled for almost two decades and now hosts the Port Moresby Vipers rugby league team. As of 2023, it has capacity for 20,000 spectators.

== Redevelopment and Rectangular configuration ==
In late 2003, a three-stage redevelopment of the site at a cost of K120 million via a public-private partnership began to expand the capacity to seat 25,000 people. The redeveloped stadium will be used for rugby league, rugby union, and soccer in a venue fit for FIFA standards, naturally grassed and with lighting suitable for television broadcasting of night events. The plans for the six-storey main stand included eight restaurants and a gymnasium with the facilities to host the weightlifting competition for the 2015 Pacific Games. Australian football and cricket were to be catered for by further expansion in stage three of the redevelopment.

However the stadium was not completed in time for the Pacific Games, which was moved to the Sir John Guise Stadium and the project remained abandoned for years.
