= AFL Europe Championship =

Australian football competition between European national teams

- Sport: Australian rules football
- First season: 2010
- No. of teams: 2010: 8; 2013: 6; 2016: 4; 2019: 6
- Region: Europe
- Most recent champion: (Republic of Ireland) Ireland (3rd title) (2022)
- Most titles: (Republic of Ireland) Ireland (3 titles)
- Website: AFL Europe

The AFL Europe Championship is a triennial international Australian football competition played between European national teams. The European Championship is played in a full traditional 18-a-side format (formerly 16-a-side) unlike the Euro Cup which has a 9-a-side format. It is organised by AFL Europe and held every three years.

Players are not paid to participate. Eligibility is similar to the Australian Football International Cup with national team representatives restricted to nationals - citizens who were resident in the country between the ages of 10 and 16.

The inaugural competition was played in Sweden and Denmark in August 2010. The 2013 championships were held in Ireland in August 2013. A women's division was added in 2016 which was won by host nation Great Britain.

Historically the competition has been dominated by Great Britain and Ireland who between them have won every edition of the competition, both men's and women's, up to the 2022 tournament, while Germany and the Scandinavian teams have also featured regularly in the final phases.

== Results ==
=== Men's Division ===
Year	Host	Final			Third place match			Number of teams
Year	Host	Champions	Score	Runners Up	Third	Score	Fourth	Number of teams
2010	Copenhagen, Denmark; Scania, Sweden	(Republic of Ireland) Ireland	68 - 51	Denmark	Sweden	39 - 29	(United Kingdom) Great Britain	8
2013	(Republic of Ireland) Dublin, Ireland	(Republic of Ireland) Ireland	7.3 (45) - 6.8 (44)	(United Kingdom) Great Britain	Denmark	7.6 (48) - 5.2 (32)	Sweden	6
2016	London, United Kingdom	(United Kingdom) Great Britain	7.9 (51) - 4.5 (29)	(Republic of Ireland) Ireland	Germany	4.6 (30) - 4.5 (29)	Sweden	4
2019	London, United Kingdom	(United Kingdom) Great Britain	7.7 (48) - 2.2 (14)	Denmark	(Republic of Ireland) Ireland		Croatia	6
2022	Zagreb, Croatia	(Republic of Ireland) Ireland	10.10 (70) - 7.3 (45)	France	(United Kingdom) Great Britain	13.12 (90) - 5.3 (33)	Croatia	5

=== Team performance ===
Team	2010	2013	2016	2019	2022
Croatia	5th	5th	—N/a	4th	4th
Denmark	2nd	3rd	—N/a	2nd	—N/a
Finland	8th	—N/a	—N/a	—N/a	—N/a
Germany	7th	6th	3rd	6th	5th
(United Kingdom) Great Britain	4th	2nd	1st	1st	3rd
Iceland	6th	—N/a	—N/a	—N/a	—N/a
(Republic of Ireland) Ireland	1st	1st	2nd	3rd	1st
Sweden	3rd	4th	4th	—N/a	—N/a
France	—N/a	—N/a	—N/a	5th	2nd

Team	Champions	Runners-up	Third place
(Republic of Ireland) Ireland	3	1	1
(United Kingdom) Great Britain	2	1	1
Denmark	-	2	1
France	-	1	-
Sweden	-	-	1
Germany	-	-	1

=== Women's Division ===
Year	Host	Final			Third place match			Number of teams
Year	Host	Champions	Score	Runners Up	Third	Score	Fourth	Number of teams
2016	London, United Kingdom	(United Kingdom) Great Britain	1.2 (8) - 0.2 (2)	(Republic of Ireland) Ireland	(Europe) European Crusaders			3
2019	London, United Kingdom	(Republic of Ireland) Ireland	102 point win	Germany	(Europe) European Crusaders			3
2022	Zagreb, Croatia	(Republic of Ireland) Ireland	115 point win	(United Kingdom) Great Britain	Germany	33 point win	Croatia	5

== See also ==
- Euro Cup (AFL)
- AFL European Combine
