= List of national Australian rules football teams =

Map of the world indicating the nations where Australian rules football was most played in 2005. The stronger regions are indicated in shades of red, areas in which it were most played, areas where the game was unknown or least played are indicated in grey.

This is a list of the national Australian Football teams in the world.

Note: In order to be recognised as a true national team and not simply ex-patriates, the list is subject to International Cup eligibility rules.

== List ==
Country	Nickname(s)	Notes
Andorra	Crows (Catalan: Corbs, Spanish: Cuervos, French: Corbeaux)	
Australia		Ceremonial only, does not compete against other countries.
Austria	Avalanche (German: Lawine)	
Cambodia	Eagles (Khmer: ឥន្ទ្រី, romanized: Inth)	
Canada	Northwind (French: Vent du Nord), Northern Lights (French: Aurores Boréales)	
Catalonia		Australian rules football is the only sport in the world where Catalonia competes at a national level.
Croatia	Knights (Croatian: Vitezovi)	
Czech Republic	Lions (Czech: Lvi)	
Denmark	Vikings (Danish: Vikinger)	
(Timor-Leste) East Timor	Crocodiles (Tetum: Lafaek, Portuguese: Crocodilos, Indonesian: Buaya)	
Fiji		
Finland	Icebreakers (Finnish: Jäänmurtajat, Swedish: Isbrytarna), Lions (Finnish: Leijonat, Swedish: Lejonen)	
France		
Germany	Black Eagles (German: Schwarze Adler)	
Hong Kong	Dragons (Yue Chinese: 龍, romanized: Lóng)	
Iceland	Ravens (Icelandic: Hrafnar)	
India	Tigers (Hindi: बाघों, romanized: baaghon)	
Indonesia	Garudas Indonesian: Garuda)	
(Republic of Ireland) Ireland	Warriors (Irish: Laochra), Banshees (Irish: Mná Sí)	
Japan	Samurais (Japanese: 侍, romanized: Samurai)	
Laos	Elephants (Lao: ຊ້າງ, romanized: sang)	
Macau	Lightning (Yue Chinese: 閃電, romanized: Shǎndiàn, Portuguese: Relâmpago)	
Malaysia	Warriors (Malay: Pahlawan)	
Nauru	Chiefs	Nauru's national sport is Australian rules football and has been watched on television and/or at stadiums by up to 30% of the population.
Netherlands	Flying Dutchmen (Dutch: Vliegende Hollanders)	
New Zealand	Hawks (Māori: Ngā Kāhu), Falcons (Māori: Ngā Kārearea)	
Norway	Polar Bears (Norwegian: Isbjørnene)	
Papua New Guinea	Mosquitos (Tok Pisin: Ol Moksito)	Also nicknamed the Telekom PNG Mosquitos for sponsorship purposes.
Poland	Devils (Polish: Diabły)	
Russia		
Samoa	Kangaroos (Samoan: Kagalu), Bulldogs	
Scotland	Puffins (Scots: Tammie Nouries, Scottish Gaelic: Buthaidean), Clansmen (Scottish Gaelic: Luchd-cinnidh)	The team also plays under the United Kingdom combined team.
Singapore	Wombats (Chinese: 袋熊, romanized: Dài xióng, Malay: Wombat, Tamil: வொம்பாட்ஸ், romanized: Vompāṭs)	
South Africa	Lions (Zulu: Amabhubesi, Xhosa: Iingonyama, Afrikaans: Leeus), Buffaloes (Zulu: Izinyathi, Xhosa: Iinyathi, Afrikaans: Buffels)	
Spain	Bulls (Spanish: Toros)	
Sweden	Elks (Swedish: Älgar)	
Switzerland		
Tonga	Black Marlins (Tongan: Ngaahi Hakula ʻUliʻuli), Thunder (Tongan: Fatulisi), Storm (Tongan: Matangi)	
United Kingdom	Bulldogs	The team also plays under constituent national teams.
United States	Revolution, Freedom	
Wales	Red Dragons (Welsh: Dreigiau Coch)	The team also plays under the United Kingdom combined team.

== See also ==
- Geography of Australian rules football
- List of Australian Football Leagues outside Australia
- Australian Football International Cup
- List of International Australian rules football tournaments
- Australian rules football exhibition matches
