= 2012 EU Cup Australian rules football =

7th EU Cup - Aussie Rules: Edinburgh 2012 -
Teams	18
Host	Edinburgh, Scotland, UK
Date	22 September
Podium
Champions; Runners-up; Third place Fourth place	(Republic of Ireland) Ireland; Denmark; England; Italy

The 2012 Euro Cup of Australian rules football was a 9-a-side Footy tournament held in Edinburgh (Scotland) on 22 September 2012, with 16 national men's teams and two women's teams. The men's tournament was won by Ireland who defeated Denmark in the Grand Final by 1 point to claim its second EU Cup Championship. Denmark's Aksel Bang was named Player of the Tournament and was the Leading Goal Kicker.

== Venue ==
Matches were played at Peffermill Fields at the University of Edinburgh in Edinburgh.

== Teams ==
William Wallace Group
Croatia
France
Austria
Sweden

Andy Murray Group
England
Scotland
Denmark
Norway

Chris Hoy Group
Italy
Wales
Germany
Iceland

Sean Connery Group
(Republic of Ireland) Ireland
Spain
Finland
Czech Republic

Women's
(Republic of Ireland) Ireland
(European Union) European Crusaders

== Pools round ==
=== William Wallace Group ===
Team	Score	Team	Score
Croatia	3.8 (26)	Austria	0.3 (3)
France	(9)	Sweden	(17)
Austria	0.1 (1)	Sweden	8.6 (54)
Croatia	4.5 (29)	France	1.5 (11)
Sweden	2.4 (16)	Croatia	3.4 (22)
France	(59)	Austria	(1)

=== Andy Murray Group ===
Team	Score	Team	Score
England	3.3 (21)	Denmark	1.3 (9)
Scotland	(45)	Norway	(2)
Denmark	9.9 (63)	Norway	1.3 (9)
England	7.7 (49)	Scotland	2.5 (17)
Norway	0.2 (2)	England	3.19 (32)
Denmark	6.4 (40)	Scotland	2.4 (16)

=== Chris Hoy Group ===
Team	Score	Team	Score
Italy	1.6 (12)	Germany	1.4 (10)
Wales	(20)	Iceland	(14)
Italy	6.3 (39)	Wales	1.0 (6)
Germany	11.12 (78)	Iceland	2.2 (14)
Iceland	2.1 (13)	Italy	3.10 (28)
Germany	11.4 (70)	Wales	0.1 (1)

=== Sean Connery Group ===
Team	Score	Team	Score
(Republic of Ireland) Ireland	10.7 (67)	Finland	0.2 (2)
Spain	(41)	Czech Republic	(27)
Finland	4.6 (30)	Czech Republic	2.2 (14)
(Republic of Ireland) Ireland	12.14 (86)	Spain	0.1 (1)
Czech Republic	1.1 (7)	(Republic of Ireland) Ireland	16.10 (106)
Finland	(47)	Spain	(20)

== Euro Cup Finals ==
Match	Team	Score	Team	Score
Cup Quarter Final	Croatia	2.4 (16)	Denmark	3.4 (22)
Cup Quarter Final	Italy	6.3 (39)	Finland	0.4 (4)
Cup Quarter Final	England	4.6 (30)	Sweden	1.8 (14)
Cup Quarter Final	(Republic of Ireland) Ireland	9.6 (60)	Germany	0.2 (2)
Cup Semi Final	Denmark	8.3 (51)	Italy	1.5 (11)
Cup Semi Final	England	4.1 (25)	(Republic of Ireland) Ireland	7.4 (46)

== Grand final ==
Team	Score	Team	Score
Denmark	4.5 (29)	(Republic of Ireland) Ireland	5.0 (30)

== Ranking Matches ==
=== Bowl Finals ===
Match	Team	Score	Team	Score
Bowl Semi Final	France	5.6 (36)	Scotland	3.3 (21)
Bowl Semi Final	Wales	5.10 (40)	Spain	7.4 (46)
Bowl Grand Final	France	11.8 (74)	Spain	0.5 (5)

=== Plate Finals ===
Match	Team	Score	Team	Score
Plate Semi Final	Austria	0.1 (1)	Norway	6.7 (43)
Plate Semi Final	Iceland	4.3 (27)	Czech Republic	1.7 (13)
Plate Grand Final	Norway	6.5 (41)	Iceland	1.3 (9)

== Women's Match ==
Team	Score	Team	Score
(Republic of Ireland) Ireland	13.14 (92)	(European Union) European Crusaders	8.8 (56)

== Final standings ==
1. Ireland (EU Cup Winners)
2. Denmark (EU Cup Runners Up)
3. England (EU Cup 3rd Place Winners)
4. Italy
5. Croatia
6. Germany
7. Sweden
8. Finland
9. France (Bowl Winners)
10. Spain
11. Scotland
12. Wales
13. Norway (Plate Winners)
14. Iceland
15. Czech Republic
16. Austria
