= Great Britain football team =

This article lists all Great Britain national teams who play a code of football:

- United Kingdom national football team
- Great Britain men's Olympic football team
- Great Britain women's Olympic football team
- Great Britain national rugby league team
- Great Britain women's national rugby league team
- Great Britain women's national rugby union team
- British & Irish Lions (rugby union)
- British & Irish Lions Women (rugby union)
- Great Britain national American football team
- Great Britain women's national American football team
- Great Britain men's national Australian rules football team
- Great Britain women's national Australian rules football team

== See also ==
- England national football team
- England women's national football team
- Scotland national football team
- Scotland women's national football team
- Wales national football team
- Wales women's national football team
- Northern Ireland national football team
- Northern Ireland women's national football team
- List of national sports teams of the United Kingdom
