= Great Britain national Australian rules football team =

Great Britain national Australian rules football team may refer to:

- Great Britain men's national Australian rules football team, men's national Australian rules football team
- Great Britain women's national Australian rules football team, women's national Australian rules football team
