= 2013 AFL Europe Championship =

Dublin 2013

Tournament details
- Host country: (Republic of Ireland) Ireland
- Dates: 3 August – 10 August
- Teams: 6

Final positions
- Champions: Republic of Ireland (2nd title)
- Runners-up: Great Britain
- Third place: Denmark
- Fourth place: Sweden

The 2013 AFL Europe Championship was a 16-a-side Australian rules football competition held in Dublin, Ireland between European countries. This was the second AFL Europe Championship, run by AFL Europe. Matches were played at DCU Sportsground in northern Dublin. Contested between six national teams, the Championships were won by Ireland.

== Teams ==
- Pool A
  - Croatia
  - (Republic of Ireland) Ireland
  - Sweden
- Pool B
  - Denmark
  - Germany
  - (United Kingdom) Great Britain

== Results ==
=== Round 1 ===
- (United Kingdom) Great Britain: 7.1 (43) d Denmark: 4.9 (33)
- (Republic of Ireland) Ireland: 3.4 (22) d Sweden: 2.4 (16)
- Croatia: 7.5 (47) d Germany: 5.3 (33)

Match Reports - Round 1

=== Round 2 ===
- Sweden: 5.11 (41) d Croatia: 5.2 (32)
- (United Kingdom) Great Britain: 9.12 (66) d Germany: 2.3 (15)
- (Republic of Ireland) Ireland: 7.7 (49) d Denmark: 6.3 (39)

Match Reports - Round 2

=== Round 3 ===
- Denmark: 8.12 (60) d Germany: 2.1 (13)
- (United Kingdom) Great Britain: 6.4 (40) d Sweden: 3.2 (20)
- (Republic of Ireland) Ireland: 12.11 (83) d Croatia: 1.1 (7)

Match Reports - Round 3

=== Finals ===
Grand Final:

- (Republic of Ireland) Ireland: 7.3 (45) d (United Kingdom) Great Britain: 6.8 (44)

3rd Place Match:

- Denmark: 7.6 (48) d Sweden:

5th Place Match:

- Croatia: 9.5 (59) d Germany: 4.5 (29)

Match Reports - Grand Final Day
