= European Crusaders =

Australian rules football team with EU citizens

Europe
- Governing body: AFL Europe

Rankings
- Current: 10th (as of October 2022)

International Cup
- Appearances: 1 (first in 2017)
- Best result: 7th (2017)

The European Crusaders are an international Australian rules football team composed of European citizens. Although Team Europe operates with a similar concept, the Crusaders were notably the first female all European team to compete in Australia for the Australian Football International Cup. The team was also the first female combined team to play in the International Cup with players originating from Croatia, Denmark, England, France, Germany, Italy, Norway, Sweden, Northern Ireland and Scotland. A male European Crusaders team was originally formed but disbanded prior to the tournament.

== 2017 AFL International Cup ==
In 2017 the European Crusaders formed and competed in the International AFL Women's Competition. Meeting only a few days before the beginning of the tournament, the Crusaders became known for "their spirit, determination and improvement" as it progressed. They trained at Princes Park, South Melbourne. The majority of the team and staff are French women competing in the French Australian Football League, with a number of Paris Cockerels.

=== 2017 Squad Members ===
Staff Members
Role	Name
Team Manager	Fanny Maillet
Coach	Graham Andrews
Support Staff	Jon Sculley, Paul Ritchie, Joanne Mouradian

2017 International Cup Team
Player Number	Player name	Country	Team	Notes
1	Isabella Rositano	Italy	Rookie	Isabella is an Australian canoeist who made her Australian Rules debut with the European Crusaders in the first game of the tournament.
2	Mathilde Combes	France	Paris Cockerelles	
3	Joanne Mouradian	France	Paris Cockerelles	Joanne sustained an injury during training so took on the role of runner during the International Cup.
4	Coline Duquet	France	Paris Cockerelles	Coline was notably awarded a place on the 2017 World Team after her work in fallback.
5	Naima Ait El Mouden	France	Paris Cockerelles	
6	Marine Assemat	France	ALFA Lions	
7	Berengere Portal	France	Paris Cockerelles	Captain
8	Catherine Giles	France	Paris Cockerelles	
9	Linn Gardell	Sweden	Port Malmo Lynx	
11	Amanda King	Sweden	Boston Demons (USA)	
12	Emilie Giancarli	France	Bordeaux Bombers	
13	Rachel Urquhart	Scotland	South Melbourne	Vice Captain
14	Dagmara Ratinski	Croatia	Perth Angels	
17	Leila Morgenroth	Germany	Sydney Uni Bombers	
18	Charline Wood	Germany	Newtown Breakaways	
19	Helene Pittet	France	Toulouse Hawks	
22	Ana Barisic	Croatia	ZKAN Zagreb Panthers	
26	Anne Pille	France	Paris Cockerelles	
33	Laura Gauss	Germany	North Shore Bombers (Australia)	
40	Camille Portal	France	Bordeaux Bombers	
47	Frances Finn	Northern Ireland	Perth Angels (Australia)	
81	Claire Perez	France	Paris Cockerelles	
