= 2010 AFL Europe Championship =

2010 Australian Football European Championship
EC10

Tournament details
- Host countries: Denmark; Sweden
- Dates: 1 August – 7 August
- Teams: 8

Final positions
- Champions: Republic of Ireland (1st title)
- Runners-up: Denmark
- Third place: Sweden
- Fourth place: Great Britain

The 2010 Australian Football European Championship was the inaugural AFL Europe Championship, a 16-a-side Australian football competition between European countries. Contested between eight national teams, the Championships were won by Ireland.

== Teams ==
- Pool A
  - Denmark
  - Finland
  - (United Kingdom) Great Britain
  - Iceland
- Pool B
  - Croatia
  - Germany
  - (Republic of Ireland) Ireland
  - Sweden

== Results ==
=== Round One ===
- Sweden: 16.17(113) d Croatia: 2.5(17)
- (United Kingdom) Great Britain: 11.16(82) d Finland: 1.2(8)
- (Republic of Ireland) Ireland: 18.10(118) d Germany: 0.0(0)
- Denmark: 19.16(130) d Iceland: 2.1(13)

=== Round Two ===
- (United Kingdom) Great Britain: 11.20(86) d Iceland: 4.12(36)
- (Republic of Ireland) Ireland: 20.21(141) d Croatia: 6.8(44)
- Denmark: 14.20(104) d Finland: 2.1(13)
- Sweden: 8.14(62) d Germany: 4.2(26)

=== Round Three ===
- Iceland: 8.9(57) d Finland: 2.5(17)
- Croatia: 9.12(66) d Germany: 3.3(21)
- Denmark: 10.11(71) d (United Kingdom) Great Britain: 5.5(35)
- (Republic of Ireland) Ireland: 13.21(99) d Sweden: 2.4(16)

=== 7th Playoff ===
- Germany: 5.9(39) d Finland: 0.5(5)

=== 5th Playoff ===
- Croatia: 19.11(125) d Iceland: 12.11(83)

=== 3rd Playoff ===
- Sweden: 5.9(39) d (United Kingdom) Great Britain: 3.11(29)

=== Grand Final ===
- (Republic of Ireland) Ireland: 11.2(68) d Denmark: 8.3(51)

== Ladder ==
Position	Team
1st	(Republic of Ireland) Ireland
2nd	Denmark
3rd	Sweden
4th	(United Kingdom) Great Britain
5th	Croatia
6th	Iceland
7th	Germany
8th	Finland
