= AFLG =

AFLG may refer to:

- American Family Legacy Group LLC
- Australian Football League Germany
- American Football League (1926) (the "G" referred to star player Red Grange)
