= Great Britain men's national Australian rules football team =

Great Britain
- Nickname(s): Bulldogs
- Head coach: Dean Thomas
- Captain: Ross Denton
- Top scorer: Andy Walkden (30)
Home colours	Alternate colours

Rankings
- Current: ▼8th (as of October 2022)

International Cup
- Appearances: 6 (first in 2002)
- Best result: 6th (2002, 2005, 2017)
- Website: aflengland.org

The Great Britain men's national Australian rules football team is known as the Great Britain Bulldogs. The team is made up of the best British born players selected from clubs of in England, Wales and Scotland, and occasional appearances from British players playing for clubs in Australia. In AFL Europe, separate national teams represent England, Wales and Scotland.

As well as regular international friendlies, the team has played in every Australian Football International Cup since its inception in 2002.

They also compete at the triennial AFL Europe Championship, winning back to back titles in 2016 and 2019.

The Great Britain women's national Australian rules football team are called the Great Britain Swans.

== History ==
=== 1888 British Lions tour ===
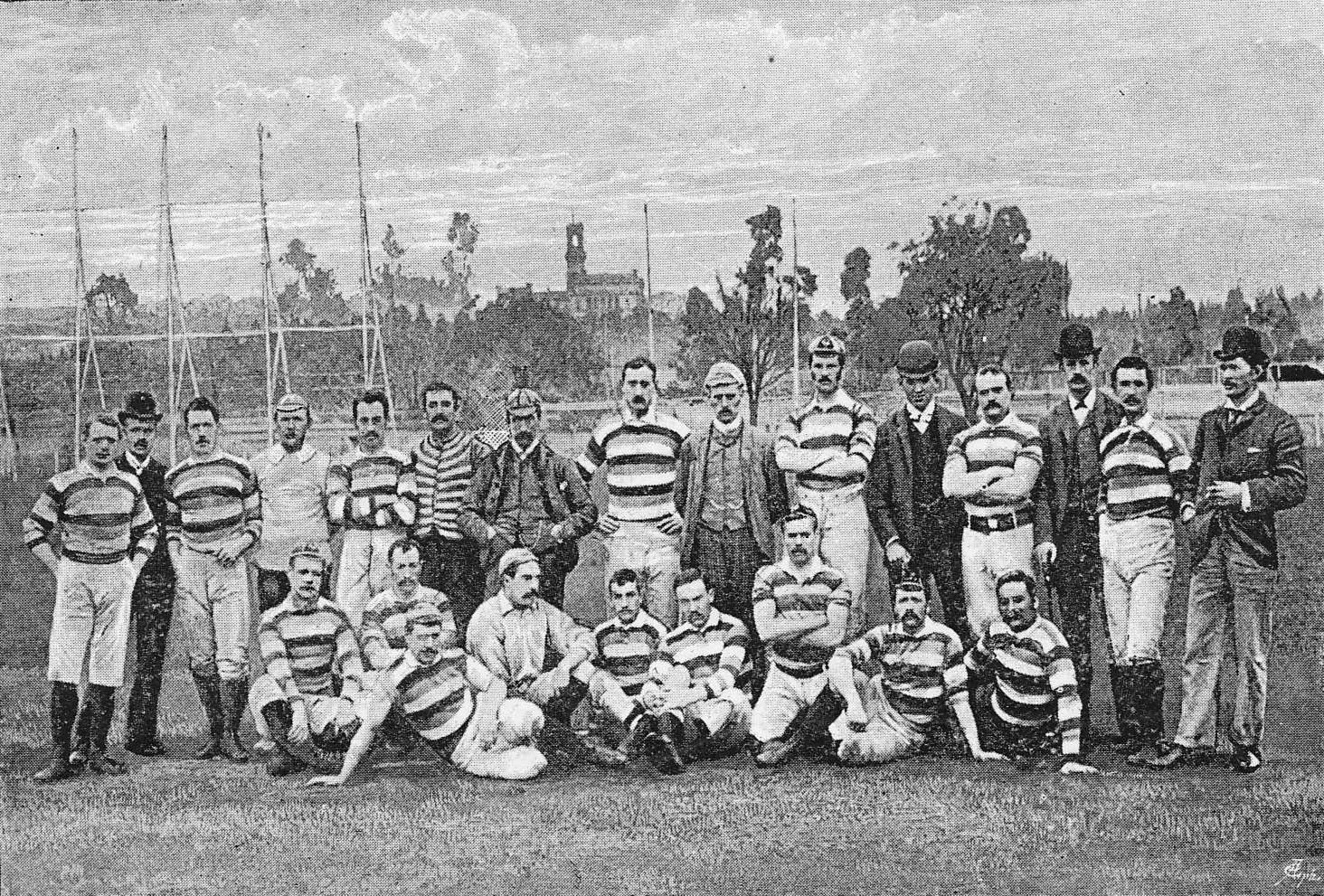
The British Isles Australian rules team in 1888 at Scotch Oval, close to the Melbourne Cricket Ground and the East Melbourne Cricket Ground, on both of which the team played Australian Rules Football against local clubs

The first team to represent Great Britain in Australian rules was the British Lions during the 1888 British Lions tour to New Zealand and Australia. The team played 19 matches of Australian rules winning six and drawing one. Of the matches that went ahead Great Britain defeated Bendigo by 4 goals, drew with Castlemaine, defeated the powerhouse Port Adelaide on the Adelaide Oval by a goal, Horsham by 6 goals as well as Ballarat, Sandhurst and Kyneton by a goal. A standout for the team was Andrew Stoddart. However following the tour the codes had diverged to a point that it was felt that such exchanges could not continue and Australia's policy was not to compete internationally in the sport.

=== 1993 Great Britain Bulldogs team ===
The Great Britain Bulldogs played their first international on 2 October 1993 against Canada in Toronto.

They competed at the 2001 Atlantic Alliance Cup, recording wins over Canada and eventual runners-up Denmark. Great Britain's Best and Fairest player was Tyrone Hallam.

In 2002, the Great Britain Bulldogs competed at the first ever Australian Football International Cup in Australia, finishing sixth. Three years later they also finished sixth at the 2005 tournament.

In October 2005, the Bulldogs played against Ireland in a curtain raiser at the West Coast Eagles vs Fremantle exhibition match at the Oval in London. After this match head coach Matt Connell handed over the coaching role to Charlie Kielty.

In October 2006, the Great Britain vs Ireland fixture was repeated before the Geelong Football Club vs Port Adelaide Power match.

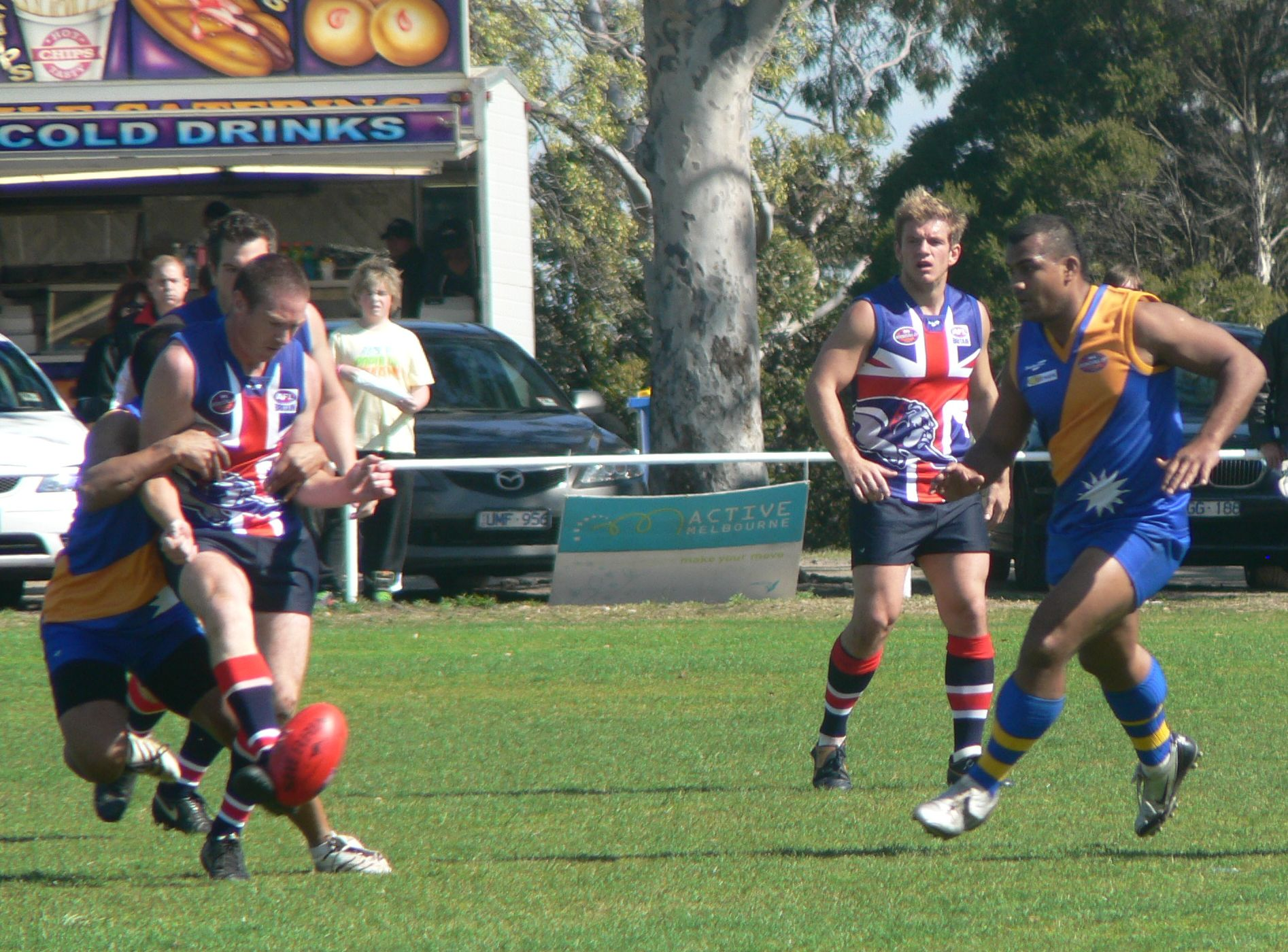
British Bulldog manages to get a kick away despite being tackled by a Nauruan opponent during the 2008 Australian Football International Cup

After coach Charlie Kielty resigned in late 2009, Mark Pitura became head coach, with Rob Fielder as assistant. The first test was against a travelling Denmark Vikings squad, which resulted in an 11.10 (76) to 9.9 (63) win for the Bulldogs on Putney Heath, London.

In 2010, the squad competed in the inaugural European Championships in Denmark and Sweden. The squad achieved a credible 4th place, losing out to losing finalists Denmark in the group and co-hosts Sweden in the qualification final. Three Bulldogs were named in the Team of the Tournament. These players were Adam Bennett (Reading Kangaroos), Martyn Hinchey (Southampton Titans) and Gareth Blackstaffe-Turner (Wimbledon Hawks).

At the 2011 International Cup, Paul Harris from the Putney Magpies captained the squad to a seventh-place finish. Brendan McGeever (North London Lions), Ian Mitchell (Wolverhampton Wolves) and Paul Francis (Wimbledon Hawks) served as vice-captains.

A marked improvement in performance culminated in a fantastic performance at the 2013 AFL Europe Championships, where the squad finished as runners-up to hosts Ireland.

In 2014 the Bulldogs once again travelled to the AFL International Cup and were placed in Pool A alongside Ireland, Nauru, Fiji, France and Indonesia. Victories over France and Fiji were achieved and Great Britain finished 9th overall, defeating Fiji 5.7 (37) to 2.7 (19) in the Qualification Final.

2016 was a successful year for the Bulldogs as they became champions of Europe for the first time. The bulldogs defeated Ireland 7.9 (51) to 4.5 (29). Six players made the team of the tournament. These were Luke Booth (Huddersfield Rams), Marc Cashman (Wimbledon Hawks), Jack Coughlan (North London Lions), Myles Hudson (Wimbledon Hawks), Michael Sharp (North London Lions) and Andrew Walkden (Manchester Mosquitoes).

At the 2017 version of the AFL International Cup, Will Worthington captained the squad and was assisted by Luke Booth and Sean Walton as Vice-Captains. The Bulldogs finished in a joint-highest position of six.

As of February 2018, Ross Denton, formerly of Birmingham University and currently playing for the North London Lions, was appointed captain of the Great Britain Bulldogs.

== International competition ==
=== International Cup ===
Great Britain International Cup results
Year	Finish	P	W-L-D	PF	PA	%
2002	6/11	5	4-2-0	165	352	46.87
2005	6/10	6	2-4-0	147	266	55.26
2008	9/16	5	3-2-0	264	208	126.92
2011	7/18	6	3-3-0	197	241	81.74
2014	9/18	5	2-3-0	222	174	127.58
2017	6/18	5	3-2-0	226	211	126.06

=== AFL Europe Championship ===
Great Britain AFL Europe Championship results
Year	Host	Finish	P	W-L-D	PF	PA	%
2010	Copenhagen, Denmark & Scania, Sweden	4/8	4	2-2-0	232	154	150.64
2013	Dublin, Ireland	2/6	4	2-2-0	231	154	150.00
2016	London, United Kingdom	1/4	4	3-1-0	337	82	410.97

== Results (2010-present) ==
Scores and results list Great Britain's points tally first.

=== 2010 ===
Date	Opposition	For	Against	Venue	Winner	Status
01/08/2010	Finland	11.16 (82)	1.2 (8)	Stefan Boldklub, Copenhagen	Great Britain	AFL Europe Championship
03/08/2010	Iceland	11.20 (86)	4.12 (36)	Stenvadskolen, Farum	Great Britain	AFL Europe Championship
05/08/2010	Denmark	5.5 (35)	10.11 (71)	Stenvadskolen, Farum	Denmark	AFL Europe Championship
07/08/2010	Sweden	3.11 (29)	5.9 (39)	Limhamnsfältet IP, Malmö	Sweden	AFL Europe Championship

=== 2011 ===
Date	Opposition	For	Against	Venue	Winner	Status
03/04/2011	Ireland (Republic of Ireland)	8.6 (54)	8.11 (59)	Ireland	Ireland	International Friendly
23/06/2011	Ireland (Republic of Ireland)	5.6 (36)	11.6 (72)	London	Ireland	International Friendly
13/08/2011	East Timor (Timor-Leste)	10.10 (70)	0.0 (0)	Blacktown International Sportspark, Sydney	Great Britain	AFL International Cup
13/08/2011	Ireland (Republic of Ireland)	1.0 (6)	8.6 (54)	Blacktown International Sportspark, Sydney	Ireland	AFL International Cup
15/08/2011	Canada	6.8 (44)	2.3 (15)	Blacktown International Sportspark, Sydney	Great Britain	AFL International Cup
17/08/2011	New Zealand	0.2 (2)	15.10 (100)	Bruce Purser Reserve, Sydney	New Zealand	AFL International Cup
24/08/2011	South Africa	2.3 (15)	7.9 (51)	Ransford Oval, Melbourne	South Africa	AFL International Cup
26/08/2011	Denmark	8.12 (60)	3.3 (21)	McAllister Oval, Melbourne	Great Britain	AFL International Cup

=== 2012 ===
Date	Opposition	For	Against	Venue	Winner	Status

=== 2013 ===
Date	Opposition	For	Against	Venue	Winner	Status
02/04/2013	Ireland (Republic of Ireland)	9.4 (58)	3.2 (20)	Dublin, Ireland	Ireland	International Friendly
06/04/2013	Ireland (Republic of Ireland)	9.5 (59)	1.6 (7)	Surrey Sports Park, Guildford	Great Britain	International Friendly
03/08/2013	Denmark	7.1 (43)	4.9 (33)	Dublin, Ireland	Great Britain	AFL Europe Championship
05/08/2013	Germany	9.12 (66)	2.3 (15)	Dublin, Ireland	Great Britain	AFL Europe Championship
07/08/2013	Sweden	6.4 (40)	3.2 (20)	Dublin, Ireland	Great Britain	AFL Europe Championship
10/08/2013	Ireland (Republic of Ireland)	6.8 (44)	7.3 (45)	Dublin, Ireland	Ireland	AFL Europe Championship

=== 2014 ===
Date	Opposition	For	Against	Venue	Winner	Status
10/08/2014	France	12.18 (90)	1.1 (7)	McAllister Oval, Melbourne	Great Britain	AFL International Cup
13/08/2014	Nauru	4.5 (29)	6.14 (50)	Ransford Oval, Melbourne	Nauru	AFL International Cup
16/08/2014	Fiji	4.9 (33)	7.7 (49)	Koonung Reserve, Bulleen	Fiji	AFL International Cup
19/08/2014	Nauru	5.3 (33)	7.7 (49)	McAllister Oval, Melbourne	Nauru	AFL International Cup
22/08/2014	Fiji	5.7 (37)	2.7 (19)	Western Oval, Melbourne	Great Britain	AFL International Cup

=== 2015 ===
Date	Opposition	For	Against	Venue	Winner	Status

=== 2016 ===
Date	Opposition	For	Against	Venue	Winner	Status
14/08/2016	Sweden	18.17 (125)	1.1 (7)	Motspur Park, London	Great Britain	AFL Europe Championship
16/08/2016	Ireland (Republic of Ireland)	4.16 (40)	6.5 (41)	Motspur Park, London	Ireland	AFL Europe Championship
18/08/2016	Germany	18.14 (121)	0.5 (5)	Motspur Park, London	Great Britain	AFL Europe Championship
20/08/2016	Ireland (Republic of Ireland)	7.9 (51)	4.5 (29)	Motspur Park, London	Great Britain	AFL Europe Championship
24/09/2016	Netherlands	15.8 (98)	3.1 (19)	Battersea Park, London	Great Britain	International Friendly
22/10/2016	Ireland (Republic of Ireland)	10.11 (71)	12.6 (78)	Dublin, Ireland	Great Britain	International Friendly

=== 2017 ===
Date	Opposition	For	Against	Venue	Winner	Status
19/05/2017	Canada	15.19 (109)	0.0 (0)	Motspur Park, London	Great Britain	London Footy Carnival
06/08/2017	South Africa	9.11 (65)	4.4 (28)	McAllister Oval, Melbourne	Great Britain	AFL International Cup
09/08/2017	Canada	2.6 (18)	5.3 (33)	St. Francis Xavier College, Officer	Canada	AFL International Cup
12/08/2017	Ireland (Republic of Ireland)	8.7 (55)	9.16 (70)	Koornang Park	Ireland	AFL International Cup
15/08/2017	Fiji	8.8 (56)	3.9 (27)	McAllister Oval, Melbourne	Great Britain	AFL International Cup
18/08/2017	Nauru	5.2 (32)	8.5 (53)	McAllister Oval, Melbourne	Nauru	AFL International Cup

=== 2018 ===
Date	Opposition	For	Against	Venue	Winner	Status
25/08/2018	Netherlands	9.17 (73)	6.1 (37)	Sir Joseph Hood Memorial Field, London	Great Britain	International Friendly

== See also ==
- Australian rules football in England
- Australian rules football in Scotland
- Australian rules football in Wales
- Australian Football International Cup
