= Great Britain women's national Australian rules football team =

National sports team

Great Britain
- Nickname(s): Swans
- Head coach: Mitchell Skelly
- Captain: Laura Turner-Ramadan
- Top scorer: Danni Saulter (13)
- Home stadium: Motspur Park, London; Sir Joseph Hood Memorial Field, London
Home colours	Alternate colours

Rankings
- Current: 4th (as of October 2022)

International Cup
- Appearances: 1 (first in 2017)
- Best result: 3rd (2017)
- Website: aflengland.org

The Great Britain women's national Australian rules football team is known as the Great Britain Swans. The team is made up of the best British-born players selected from clubs in England, Wales and Scotland, and occasional appearances from British players playing for clubs in Australia.

The Swans are the reigning European Champions after defeating Ireland 1.2 (8) to 0.2 (2) in the Grand Final of the 2010 AFL Europe Championship.

In 2017, they competed in the AFL International Cup for the first time, finishing third. This is the best-ever result by a Great Britain side at an International Cup.

The Great Britain men's national Australian rules football team are called the Great Britain Bulldogs.

== History ==
The GB Swans were established in January 2016 by two England Vixens players, Charlotte-Ellen Eales and Lisa Wilson. The team was created with its sights set on entering the International Cup in Melbourne in 2017. Their inaugural coach was Garth Nevin, assisted by Ian Mitchell and Lauren Spark.

In 2017, the GB Swans made their first appearance at the International Cup in Melbourne, finishing third.

The Swans are currently coached by Ian Mitchell and the team is managed by Phil Martin.

== International competition ==
=== International Cup ===
Great Britain International Cup results
Year	Finish	P	W-L-D	PF	PA	%
2017	6/11	5	3-2-0	225	106	212.26

=== AFL Europe Championship ===
Great Britain AFL Europe Championship results
Year	Host	Finish	P	W-L-D	PF	PA	%
2016	London, United Kingdom	1/3	5	4-0-1	114	22	518.18

== Results (2016-present) ==
Scores and results list Great Britain's points tally first.

=== 2016 ===
Date	Opposition	For	Against	Venue	Winner	Status
18/08/2016	Ireland (Republic of Ireland)	2.1 (13)	1.6 (12)	Motspur Park, London	Great Britain	AFL Europe Championship
18/08/2016	European Crusaders (Europe)	8.7 (55)	0.0 (0)	Motspur Park, London	Ireland	AFL Europe Championship
19/08/2016	Ireland (Republic of Ireland)	1.2 (8)	1.2 (8)	Motspur Park, London	Draw	AFL Europe Championship
19/08/2016	European Crusaders (Europe)	84.6 (30)	0.0 (0)	Motspur Park, London	Ireland	AFL Europe Championship
20/08/2016	Ireland (Republic of Ireland)	1.2 (8)	0.2 (2)	Motspur Park, London	Great Britain	AFL Europe Championship

=== 2017 ===
Date	Opposition	For	Against	Venue	Winner	Status
20/05/2017	London All-Stars	4.7 (31)	0.1 (1)	Peckham Rye, London	Great Britain	London Footy Carnival
20/05/2017	Ireland (Republic of Ireland)	3.4 (22)	2.2 (14)	Peckham Rye, London	Great Britain	London Footy Carnival
21/05/2017	Canada	0.0 (0)	3.4 (22)	Motspur Park, London	Canada	London Footy Carnival
06/08/2017	Pakistan	20.22 (142)	0.0 (0)	Ransford Oval, Melbourne	Great Britain	AFL International Cup
09/08/2017	Fiji	5.3 (33)	3.6 (24)	Peninsula Grammar School, Melbourne	Great Britain	AFL International Cup
13/08/2017	Canada	0.3 (3)	4.10 (34)	Plenty War Memorial Park, Melbourne	Canada	AFL International Cup
15/08/2017	Ireland (Republic of Ireland)	2.3 (15)	3.5 (23)	McAllister Oval, Melbourne	Ireland	AFL International Cup
18/08/2017	USA (United States)	5.2 (32)	4.1 (25)	McAllister Oval, Melbourne	Great Britain	AFL International Cup

=== 2018 ===
Date	Opposition	For	Against	Venue	Winner	Status
25/08/2018	London All-Stars	2.8 (20)	1.3 (9)	Sir Joseph Hood Memorial Field, London	Great Britain	International Friendly

== See also ==
- Australian rules football in England
- Australian rules football in Scotland
- Australian rules football in Wales
- Australian Football International Cup
