= Stuttgart Giants =

German Australian rules football club

Names
- Former name: Zuffenhausen Giants

Club details
- Founded: 2017
- Colours: Green Black Red Yellow
- Competition: AFLG
- Ground: Wilhelm-Braun-Sportpark, Feuerbach (capacity: 4,000)

Other information
- Official website: Official Website

The Stuttgart Giants are an Australian rules football club based in the Stuttgart-Feuerbach neighborhood of Stuttgart and currently compete in the Australian Football League of Germany (AFLG). The club has both a men's and women's team. As of 2023, the club trains and plays its home matches at the Wilhelm-Braun-Sportpark in Stuttgart-Feuerbach. Their training sessions are open for all to join.

== History ==
The Stuttgart Giants formed in 2017 by the merger of two AFLG clubs from Baden-Württemberg, the Stuttgart Emus and Freiburg Taipans. The club began playing in the AFLG in 2018. From 2019 the club was a department of the SSV Zuffenhausen and in 2023 they switched to the Sportvereinigung Feuerbach 1883 e.V.

== Grounds ==
The club's trainings grounds are located in Wilhelm-Braun-Sportpark in Stuttgart-Feuerbach. Home matches were previously played at the Eberhard-Bauer-Stadion in nearby Esslingen but are now exclusively held at the Wilhelm-Braun-Sportpark.

== National League ==
The Stuttgart Giants actively compete in the German national league. From April to October each year, they play against the other teams across Germany in a series of home and away games.

The Stuttgart Giants' women's team currently plays together with the Heidelberg Knights and Frankfurt Redbacks women's teams as the 'Southern Giants'.

== See also ==
- Stuttgart Emus
