= 2016 AFL Europe Championship =

London 2016

Tournament details
- Host country: United Kingdom
- Dates: 14–20 August
- Teams: 4

Final positions
- Champions: Great Britain (1st title)
- Runners-up: Republic of Ireland
- Third place: Germany
- Fourth place: Sweden

The 2016 AFL Europe Championship was an 18-a-side Australian rules football competition held in London, United Kingdom between European countries. This was the third AFL Europe Championship, run by AFL Europe. Matches were played at Motspur Park in London. Contested between four national teams, the Championships were won by Great Britain.

== Teams ==
- (United Kingdom) Great Britain
- Germany
- (Republic of Ireland) Ireland
- Sweden

== Results ==
=== Round 1 ===
- (United Kingdom) Great Britain: 18.17 (125) d Sweden: 1.1 (7)
- (Republic of Ireland) Ireland: 17.11 (113) d Germany: 3.0 (18)

Match Reports - Round 1

=== Round 2 ===
- Germany: 7.14 (56) d Sweden: 4.4 (28)
- (Republic of Ireland) Ireland: 6.5 (41) d (United Kingdom) Great Britain: 4.16 (40)

Match Reports - Round 2

=== Round 3 ===
- (Republic of Ireland) Ireland: 19.14 (128) d Sweden: 0.5 (5)
- (United Kingdom) Great Britain: 18.14 (121) d Germany: 0.5 (5)

Match Reports - Round 3

=== Finals ===
Grand Final:

- (United Kingdom) Great Britain: 7.9 (51) d (Republic of Ireland) Ireland: 4.5 (29)

3rd Place Match:

- Germany: 4.6 (30) d Sweden: 4.5 (29)

Match Reports - Grand Final Day
