= Stuttgart Emus =

Stuttgart Australian Football Club e.V.

Names
- Nickname(s): Emus

Club details
- Founded: 2008
- Colours: Green White Black
- Competition: Australian Football League Germany
- President: (Germany) Michael Räumschüssel
- Coach: (Australia) Robert Martin
- Captain(s): (Germany) Michael Raumschlüssel
- Ground(s): Eberhard-Bauer-Stadion, Esslingen

Other information
- Official website: stuttgart-emus.de

The Stuttgart Australian Football Club e.V., nicknamed Stuttgart Emus, is an Australian rules football club, based in Stuttgart, Germany. It was founded in 2008, making it Germany's sixth Australian Football Club. It is a member of the AFLG (Australian Football League Germany), the promoting and governing body of Australian Football in Germany and is playing in the equally named first national league. In the expired season (2014) they have finished in 5th place.

== History ==
The Stuttgart Emus had their first appearance as a stand-alone club in the 2008 AFLG finals tournament, where they played a demonstration match against the 5th-placed German side, Berlin. Yet they were still wearing the guernseys of the Hamburg Dockers, because today's traditional Green and White guernseys were not delivered on time.

The first season of the Stuttgart Emus - 2009 - saw for various reason the establishment of a 2nd Division. Firstly, this was because the playing standard of the league had progressed to a stage where it was difficult for a new or developing club to compete against the established sides. This was particularly evident in the struggles of the Berlin Crocodiles to remain competitive in the previous season. Secondly, the larger clubs conversely were seeing an increase in players numbers and were in need of a venue for their reserve players. These factors, combined with the entrance of the Stuttgart Emus into the AFLG, saw the creation of a second division to the league in 2009. At the end of the season 2009 the Emus could place on the Third Position, earning respect of other clubs such as when they were playing at home against later 2nd division champions, Berlin - which happened to be the thighest loss in the club's history. The consolidation continued again in season 2010, where they came in fourth place, beating the oldest German AFL team - Frankfurt - twice.

At the beginning of the 2011 season the Emus saw themselves confronted to a huge loss of experienced players - partly from their founding era - due to retirements conditioned by age or injury (Steffen Belgardt, Chris Brown, Guy Arthur Canino) and removal (Johannes Mast, Chris Mail). However many promising players were pushing from the youth section into the professional team (Jakob Jung) and the recruiting section was purchasing some equally promising players in such a way that the proficiency level could be kept up. At the end of the season the club even saw its biggest success in its young history, winning the Match for the Third Place. In 2012 the Emus could repeat that success due to a forfeit by the Hamburg Dockers in the Match for the Third Place. Since 2018 the Emus and the Freiburg Taipans play together as the Zuffenhausen Giants.

Season	League	Place/ of
2009	AFLG 2nd Division	3./ 4
2010	AFLG	4./ 5
2011	AFLG	3./ 6
2012	AFLG	3./ 6
2013	AFLG	4./ 6
green background: climb orange background: relegation golden background: championship

== Club Symbols ==
=== Club Song ===
The lyrics are based on the club song of the West Coast Eagles and use the same melody.

We're the Emus
The Stuttgart Emus
And we're here - to show you why
We're the big birds, kings of the big game
We're the Emus, we're kicking high!

For years we learned the lessons
And we learned them very well
And now we've added - Schwäbisch magic
We’re the Emus, we’re here to stay

== Local Australian Football Activities ==
2011 has seen the formation of two further Australian Football Clubs, the Ludwigsburg Taipans and the Haslach Hawks Both clubs are located in the metropolitan area of Stuttgart, Stuttgart Region. Since some of the founding members had first been active for the Stuttgart Emus, there have been - ever since the founding of the two clubs - close ties with the Emus. So plans for a local 9a side footy league have quickly emerged. For the first year, 2012, the competition will however be limited to regular cup-tournaments, of which the first was held on April, 14th 2012.

== Individual awards ==
=== Club Awards ===
In December after each season player's awards are distributed to the most outstanding players of the season. They will be elected according to agreements of the coach and captain. The following list shows the results since 2009:

Season	Best & Fairest	Coach's Award
2009	Daniel McPhail (Australia)	Fabian Kroll (Germany)
2010	Andrew Miller (Australia)	Florian Walz (Germany) (France)
2011	Jakob Jung (Germany)	Michael Räumschlüssel (Germany)
2012	-	-
2013	-	-
2014	Jakob Jung (Germany)	Geoff Rodoreda (Australia)

=== League Awards ===
- 2009: Best Player AFLG 2nd Division, Daniel McPhail (Australia)
- 2011: Best Rookie AFLG, Jakob Jung (Germany)
- 2011: Best Player in the Match for the Third, Glenn Smith (Australia)

== List of Club Officials ==
=== Presidents ===
- Grant Walsh (Australia) (2008–2009)
- Guy Arthur Canino (United States) (2009–2011/11)
- Grant Walsh (Australia) (2011/11 - 2012/03)
- Geoff Rodoreda (Australia) (2012/03 - 2014/03)
- Michael Räumschüssel (Germany) (since 2014/03)

== Records and statistics ==
- Biggest winning margin: 62 (2011 vs. Hamburg Dockers)
- Smallest winning margin: 2 (2012 vs. Hamburg Dockers)
- Biggest losing margin: 160 (2011 vs. Rheinland Lions)
- Smallest losing margin: 4 (2009 vs. Berlin Crocodiles)
- Most premiership points in a season: 16 (2012)
- Most points in a season: 537 (2012)
- Most points against in a season: 872 (2011)
- Most seasons as leading goalkicker: 3, Aaron Wedge (2009–2011)
- Most goals: 41, Aaron Wedge (2009 - )
- Most goals in a season: 13, Florian Walz (2012); 13, Robert Martin (2012)
- Most goals kicked in a game: 7, Aaron Wedge (2011 vs. Frankfurt Redbacks)
- Most games: 36, Florian Walz (2009–2013)
- 10 Players with most games:

Place	Name	Games played	Goals
1	Florian Walz (Germany) (France)	38	34
2	Geoff Rodoreda (Australia)	25	11
3	Aaron Wedge (Australia)	24	41
4	Michael Raumschlüssel (Germany)	23	
5	Fabian Kroll (Germany)	23	6
6	Jakob Jung (Germany)	21	12
7	Guy Arthur Canino (United States)	19	1
8	Jan Plank (Germany)	18	1
9	Robert Martin (Australia)	17	19
10	Philip Duncan (Australia) (Germany)	16	14

Standing: Post Season 2014

== See also ==
- Australian rules football
- Australian rules football in Germany
- Australian rules football in Europe
