= Isabella Rositano =

Australian sportswoman

Isabella Rositano (born 2 January 1996) is an Australian multisport athlete. She performs music under the stage name Emcee Izzy. Rositano has represented Australia in canoeing and bobsleigh. She also played for Italy as an Australian rules footballer.

She has been active in campaigning against gender inequality in sports and raising awareness for depression and mental health in Australia as an ambassador for the Black Dog Institute.

== Personal ==
Rositano was born in Adelaide and is of Italian and Polish descent. She is 165 centimetres (5 ft 5 in) tall. She left Australia to complete high-school study at the Sylvia Young Theatre school in London.

== Arts career ==
Rositano was cast in Series 2 of the ABC Kids show Prank Patrol. She appeared in local state theatre productions and was a finalist in the 2011 Tropfest Jr short film competition for the film 'Fahrenheit'.

In 2017 Rositano appeared on Series 9 of Australian Millionaire Hotseat and in 2018 Rositano appeared on Series 2 of Australian Ninja Warrior as Ninja Skippy. She began studying medicine in 2018.

After beginning her career Rositano began to campaign and volunteer for charities. Rositano completed 3,128 push-ups in 21 days to raise awareness and funds for PTSD and Depression alongside the Black Dog Institute, a mental health research foundation for which she is an ambassador.

== Sports career ==
=== Canoe Sprint ===
Rositano started competing in Canoe Sprint in 2015 after transferring from rowing through the AIS Sports Draft. Rositano previously held a World Record for Rowing in the Longest Continual Indoor Row, rowing for 48 hours with teammates at Bond University. In 2015 she was the first female to win the C1 and C2 categories at state championships and went on to be one of the first female canoe champions at national championships. In 2016 Rositano also won several state and national championships and was selected onto the Australian Canoe Team. She competed at the 2016 ICF Junior and U23 World Championships, as one of the first Australian women ever to do so. She continues to train and compete in Canoe Sprint, having also raced in the 2017 ICF Junior and U23 World Championships, and 2018 World University Championships. She placed 2nd at the 2020 Australian Olympic Qualifiers and did not meet qualifying so was not selected to compete at the Tokyo 2020 Olympics. Across her canoe career Rositano won over twenty state and national Australian championship titles.

=== Australian rules football ===
At the 2017 AFL International Cup, Rositano began her Australian rules football career as part of the European Crusaders. Holding a dual-citizenship jus soli, she became the first female Australian rules footballer to represent Italy in this tournament. Wearing the #1 jersey, she made her debut in the team's first match in round one against Papua-New Guinea, listed to start as ruck rover. As well as rover, she was listed to start as a centre and defender over the course of the tournament. She played all five games in the tournament. In May 2018 Rositano was scouted to trial NRL ahead of the inaugural NRL Women's Premiership and finished among the top ranked. She also trialed with the West Coast Eagles and was selected for the WA state league.

=== Bobsleigh ===
In 2018 Rositano began to compete for Australia as a bobsleigh pilot. She trained at the Canada Olympic Park bobsleigh, luge, and skeleton track and raced in the inaugural monobob division at the 2019 North American Cup placing 9th.
