= France national Australian rules football team =

France
- Nickname(s): Coqs
- Governing body: AFL France

Rankings
- Current: ▲10th (as of October 2022)

First international
- Sweden 81–42 France (9 October 2005)

International Cup
- Appearances: 3 (first in 2011)
- Best result: 10th (2017)

The France national Australian rules football team (French: équipe de France de football australien), nicknamed the Coqs, represents France in international Australian rules football.

The team wears the colours of the French flag: blue, white and red. The team's symbol is the Gallic rooster.

The Coqs have competed in the Australian Football International Cup three times, debuting in 2011 and returning to compete in the 2014 and 2017 editions of the tournament. France also participates in the EU Cup, and won the inaugural Footy 9s World Cup in 2008 without losing a single game.

== Results ==
=== 2008 World Cup 9s ===
	2008 Footy 9s World Cup Group B
13 September 2008	France 65	def.	Spain 28	Valls, Catalonia, Spain

	2008 Footy 9s World Cup Group B
13 September 2008	France 63	def.	Andorra 24	Valls, Catalonia, Spain

	2008 Footy 9s World Cup Semi-Finals
14 September 2008	France 78	def.	Argentina 8	Valls, Catalonia, Spain

	2008 Footy 9s World Cup Grand Final
14 September 2008	Catalonia 40	def. by	France 60	Valls, Catalonia, Spain

== Women's team ==
France
- Governing body: AFL France

International Cup
- Appearances: 0

In addition to a men's national team, France also has a women's national team. However, the women's team has never participated in the Women's International Cup.

== See also ==
- Australian rules football in France
- List of national Australian rules football teams
