= Göteborg Berserkers =

Gothenburg Australian Rules Football Club

Names
- Full name: Gothenburg Australian Rules Football Club
- Nickname(s): The Berserkers

2009 season
- Best and fairest: Christoffer Fager

Club details
- Founded: 2003
- Colours: Yellow and Black
- Competition: Southern Swedish League
- President: Martin Språng
- Coach: Joel Språng
- Captain(s): Karl Richard Nilsson
- Ground(s): Mellby Field
- Välen

Other information
- Official website: www.garfc.se

The Göteborg Australian Rules Football Club (Garfc), nicknamed The Berserkers, is an Australian rules football team in Gothenburg, Sweden, playing in the Southern Sweden Regional League.

== History ==
The Berserkers started training in 2003 and had their first seven-a-side game in late 2003. In 2007, they competed against South Sweden, Stockholm, and Karlstad. In 2009, Garfc played against Helsingborg and Karlstad. During 2008, Garfc also participated in an internal Gothenburg 9-a-side league where players living in the eastern part of town played for the East Lions and players from the western areas played for the West Crowns. Team membership depended on which of the two Skansar a player lived closest to: (Skansen Kronan or Skansen Lejonet).

== Colours and Jumper ==
The Berserkers wear a black no-sleeve jumper with a yellow diagonal stripe (a gift from Richmond Tigers). In cold weather, they wear a black and white striped long sleeve jumper (a gift from Collingwood Magpies).
