= Denmark national Australian rules football team =

Denmark
- Nickname(s): The Vikings
- Governing body: Danish Australian Football League

Rankings
- Current: ▲7th (as of October 2022)

First international
- Denmark 93 – 25 Great Britain GBR (1995)

International Cup
- Appearances: 3 (first in 2002)
- Best result: 4th (2002

The Vikings (Danish: Vikinger) are Denmark's national Australian rules football team. The team represents the best Danish-born players selected from the clubs of the Danish Australian Football League (DAFL). They wear the national colours of red and white, with the top half of Australian rules football in the shape of a horned "Viking" helmet.

The team was formed in 1992 to play the North London Lions from the British Australian Rules Football League in Denmark. Proper international competition began in 1994 when Denmark played an international in England. In 1995, the DAFL made the decision to exclude Australians from its national team.

The Vikings participated in the inaugural 2002 Australian Football International Cup held in Melbourne (finishing 4th). The national team was one of two teams (the other being Nauru) that withdrew from the 2005 tournament due to an inability of the Danish league to finance the trip.

== International competition ==
=== International Cup ===
- 2002: 4th
- 2005: Did not enter
- 2008: 11th
- 2011: 8th
- 2014: Did not enter
- 2017: Did not enter

=== European championships ===
- 2010: 2nd
- 2013: 3rd
- 2016: Did not enter
- 2019: 2nd

=== EU Cup ===
==== Men's ====
- 2014: 1st
- 2015: 1st
- 2018: 1st

==== Women's ====
- 2015: 2nd
