= Australian rules football in Iceland =

Australian Rules Football was played by three clubs in Iceland, with the Andspyrnusamband Íslands (Icelandic Australian Football League – IceAFL) being the main league and controlling body for the sport. The IceAFL was founded in 2009, and regular competition commenced in 2010. The league was the world's most northerly Australian Rules Football league. Since the inaugural Arctic Cup competition Australian Rules Football hasn't been played in Iceland.

== History ==
Australian rules football has been played in Iceland since 20 May 2009, when Friðgeir Torfi Ásgeirsson, who had played in the Danish Australian Football League, placed an ad in a local newspaper and put up flyers at pubs and schools around Reykjavik looking for players. A group of seven people gathered that afternoon at the far end of the Reykjavik Pond. Before the first club was founded in Iceland, a national team, named the Icelandic Ravens, had been assembled for the 2009 EU Cup. The first teams were founded in April 2010 and are known as the Dragons, Eagles and Bulls. The team names come from Iceland's coat of arms, leaving the Giant as the only symbol unaccounted for.

The current (2017) president is Friðgeir Torfi Ásgeirsson.

== Clubs ==
There are three clubs currently playing Australian Rules Football in Iceland. They play each other in the nine-a-side IceAFL league. The league was founded in 2009 by Friðgeir Torfi Ásgeirsson, who is the current league president. In its inaugural year 2010, the IceAFL league was named the IceAFL Fostersleague after its main sponsor.

The Bulls

Eyjólfur Bjarni Sigurjónsson, having taken over as National Coach from Friðgeir Torfi Ásgeirsson, founded the Bulls and captained them. In the Icelandic AFL's inaugural year the Bulls won the double by winning both the pre-season Cup Tournament and the domestic league.

The Dragons

The Dragons were founded by Jón Zophoníasson, who captained and coached the team until after the European Championships 2010, when Viðar Valdimarsson took over as coach. In the spring of 2012 the Dragons moved north to Akureyri and are currently (summer of 2012) managed by Sölvi Fannar Sigmarsson, and coached by Jón Hrói Finnsson.

The Eagles

The Eagles were founded by national team captain and league founder Friðgeir Torfi Ásgeirsson.

== National team ==
Iceland
- Nickname(s): Ravens
- Governing body: AFL Europe

Rankings
- Current: Not ranked (as of October 2022)

International Cup
- Appearances: 0

The Icelandic national team is nicknamed the Ravens and participated in two international competitions in its first year of existence. The Ravens reached the 9PO at the EU Cup 2009, beating the EU Crusaders to take home the EU Cup Bowl. In its second outing, Iceland, along with players from France, played in the inaugural full-field Australian Rules European Championships in Denmark and Sweden. After losses to hosts Denmark and Great Britain, Iceland defeated Finland before losing to Croatia, and ultimately finished in sixth place. In the 2012 Euro Cup, after losing against Norway in the Euro Plate final, they ended up in overall 14th place.

== List of Icelandic Champions ==
2010: Bulls
2011: Bulls
2012: Eagles
2013: Bulls/Eagles (combined team)
2014: Eagles
2015: Bulls
2016: no league competition
2017: no league competition

== List of Icelandic Cup winners ==
2010: Bulls (2 games won, 0 lost).

No national cup tournament has been held since 2010

== Arctic Cup ==
Iceland is a founding member of the Arctic Cup Tournament and the inaugural tournament was hosted by Iceland in 2017.

== List of Best and Fairest ==
2009 Leifur Bjarnason (based on games with the national team, as no league had been officially formed yet).
2010 Leifur Bjarnason
2011 Leifur Bjarnason
2012 Leifur Bjarnason
2013 Leifur Bjarnason
2014 Leifur Bjarnason
2015 Leifur Bjarnason
2016 N/A (No league competition)
2017 N/A (No league competition)
