= 2017 Australian Football International Cup =

AFL International Cup 2017

Tournament details
- Host country: Australia
- Dates: 5–19 August 2017
- Teams: 26 (18 Men's, 8 Women's)

Final positions
- Champions: Papua New Guinea (3rd title)
- Runners-up: New Zealand
- Third place: Ireland

Tournament statistics
- Matches played: 65 (45 Men's, 20 Women's)

The 2017 Australian Football International Cup (also known as the AFL International Cup 2017 or IC17) was the sixth edition of the Australian Football International Cup, a triennial international Australian rules football competition run by the Australian Football League (AFL).

It was contested between 5–19 August 2017, with games played in Melbourne. All three previous men's tournament champions (Ireland, New Zealand and Papua New Guinea) participated in the tournament. Previous women's winners (Ireland and Canada) also competed in the tournament. Papua New Guinea achieved its 3rd men's title and Ireland achieved its 2nd women's title.

== Background ==
=== Teams ===
The 2017 AFL International Cup was played in Melbourne from 5 to 19 August, with 18 men's teams and eight women's teams competing.

- Men's teams: Canada, China, Croatia,† Fiji, France, Germany,† Great Britain, India, Indonesia, Ireland, Japan, Nauru, New Zealand, Pakistan, Papua New Guinea, South Africa, Sri Lanka,† USA.
- Women's teams: Canada, European Crusaders,† Fiji, Great Britain,† Ireland, Pakistan,† Papua New Guinea,† USA.

† Team made their tournament debut

The European Crusaders was a combined team made up of women from Britain, Croatia, France, Germany, Ireland, Italy, Poland and Sweden.

In the table below, the numbers in parentheses refer to the team's Unofficial World Rankings by World Footy News prior to the competition.

Men's

Division I	Division II
Canada (9); Fiji (13); France (14); (United Kingdom) Great Britain (7); Ireland (4); Nauru (5); New Zealand (3); Papua New Guinea (2); South Africa (6); United States (8)	Pool A; China (19); Croatia (12); Indonesia; Sri Lanka; Pool B; Germany (15); India (21); Japan (16); Pakistan

Women's

Pool A	Pool B
Canada (2); Fiji; Great Britain; Pakistan	(Europe) European Crusaders; Ireland (4); Papua New Guinea; United States (3)

=== Format ===
For the first time, the men's fixture was played across two divisions. Division One played four matches against other teams within the division and were ranked from one to ten, with finals to follow between the top two placed teams on the ladder, the third and fourth placed teams, and so on.

The men's Division Two competition and the women's competition saw teams split into two pools of four with each team playing matches against the three opponents in their pool before competing in semi-finals and grand finals based on finishing positions within the pool.

The women's grand final was played at Etihad Stadium as a curtain-raiser to the Round 22 clash between Carlton and Hawthorn. The men's grand final was played at the Melbourne Cricket Ground as a curtain-raiser to the Round 22 match between Collingwood and Geelong.

=== Venues ===
The majority of the matches were played at Royal Park in the Melbourne suburb of Parkville. The inclusion of a "Community Round" allowed matches to be played as curtain-raisers to local suburban, amateur and country matches. Additionally, the International Cup introduced a "School Round" to be played on 9 August, with games played at suburban and country schools.

Fixtures for the tournament were released by the AFL on 18 July 2017.

== Men's tournament ==
=== Division 1 ===
==== Ladder ====
#	TEAM	P	W	L	D	PF	PA	%	PTS
1	New Zealand	4	4	0	0	272	95	286.32	16
2	Papua New Guinea	4	3	1	0	319	135	236.30	12
3	United States	4	3	1	0	296	153	193.46	12
4	Ireland	4	3	1	0	239	152	157.24	12
5	(United Kingdom) Great Britain	4	2	2	0	192	158	121.52	8
6	Nauru	4	2	2	0	231	203	113.79	8
7	Fiji	4	1	3	0	139	175	79.43	4
8	Canada	4	1	3	0	88	181	48.62	4
9	South Africa	4	1	3	0	78	268	29.10	4
10	France	4	0	4	0	61	397	15.37	0

==== Pool Play ====
	Round 1
Sunday, 6 August 9:30am	South Africa 4.4 (28)	def. by	(United Kingdom) Great Britain 9.11 (65)	McAlister Oval, Royal Park
Sunday, 6 August 11:15am	Papua New Guinea 4.6 (30)	def. by	Ireland 6.6 (42)	McAlister Oval, Royal Park
Sunday, 6 August 1:00pm	Canada 3.7 (25)	def. by	United States 6.9 (45)	McAlister Oval, Royal Park
Sunday, 6 August 2:45pm	Fiji 10.20 (80)	def.	France 2.2 (14)	McAlister Oval, Royal Park
Sunday, 6 August 3:25pm	New Zealand 12.9 (81)	def.	Nauru 5.4 (34)	Ransford Oval, Royal Park

	Round 2 - School Round
Wed, 9 August 12:30pm	Ireland 11.13 (79)	def.	France 2.2 (14)	St. Patrick's College, Ballarat
Wed, 9 August 12:30pm	New Zealand 11.10 (76)	def.	Fiji 1.0 (6)	Linen House Center
Wed, 9 August 12:30pm	South Africa 2.5 (17)	def. by	United States 9.10 (64)	Wesley College, Glen Waverley
Wed, 9 August 12:30pm	Canada 5.3 (33)	def.	(United Kingdom) Great Britain 2.6 (18)	St. Francis Xavier College, Officer
Wed, 9 August 12:45pm	Papua New Guinea 13.6 (84)	def.	Nauru 5.5 (35)	Marty Busch Recreation Reserve, Sebastopol

	Round 3 - Community Round
Friday, 11 August 7:00pm	South Africa 4.5 (29)	def.	Fiji 3.8 (26)	Anthony Costa Oval (Geelong)
Saturday, 12 August 10:00am	France 2.2 (14)	def. by	Nauru 15.16 (106)	Victoria Park
Saturday, 12 August 12:00pm	United States 8.7 (55)	def. by	Papua New Guinea 15.2 (92)	Montrose Recreation Reserve
Saturday, 12 August 12:30pm	Canada 1.0 (6)	def. by	New Zealand 9.8 (62)	Mt Waverley Reserve
Saturday, 12 August 12:30pm	Great Britain (United Kingdom) 8.7 (55)	def. by	Ireland 9.16 (70)	Koornang Park

	Round 4
Tuesday, 15 August 8:45am	Canada 3.6 (24)	def. by	Nauru 8.8 (56)	Ransford Oval, Royal Park
Tuesday, 15 August 9:30am	United States 19.18 (132)	def.	France 3.1 (19)	McAlister Oval, Royal Park
Tuesday, 15 August 10:30am	Papua New Guinea 16.17 (113)	def.	South Africa 0.4 (4)	Ransford Oval, Royal Park
Tuesday, 15 August 11:15am	Great Britain (United Kingdom) 8.8 (56)	def.	Fiji 3.9 (27)	McAlister Oval, Royal Park
Tuesday, 15 August 12:15pm	Ireland 7.7 (49)	def. by	New Zealand 8.5 (53)	Ransford Oval, Royal Park

==== Finals ====
	Grand Finals
9th: Friday, 18 August 9:00am	South Africa 7.11 (53)	def.	France 3.3 (21)	Ransford Oval, Royal Park
7th: Friday, 18 August 10:45am	Fiji 2.9 (21)	def. by	Canada 3.6 (24)	Ransford Oval, Royal Park
5th: Friday, 18 August 2:15pm	(United Kingdom) Great Britain 5.2 (32)	def. by	Nauru 8.5 (53)	McAlister Oval, Royal Park
3rd: Friday, 18 August 2:15pm	United States 2.4 (16)	def. by	Ireland 7.6 (48)	Ransford Oval, Royal Park
GF: Sat, 19 August 12:15pm	New Zealand 4.4 (28)	def. by	Papua New Guinea 4.5 (29)	Melbourne Cricket Ground

=== Division II ===
==== Pool A ====
#	TEAM	P	W	L	D	PF	PA	%	PTS
1	China	3	3	0	0	172	90	191.11	12
2	Croatia	3	2	1	0	194	63	307.94	8
3	Indonesia	3	1	2	0	63	180	35.00	4
4	Sri Lanka	3	0	3	0	70	166	42.17	0

	Round 1
Sunday, 6 August 9:30am	Indonesia 7.7 (49)	def.	Sri Lanka 3.2 (20)	Western Oval, Royal Park
Sunday, 6 August 1:00pm	Croatia 6.8 (44)	def. by	China 7.3 (45)	Western Oval, Royal Park

	Round 2 - School Round
Wed, 9 August 11:45am	China 9.4 (58)	def.	Sri Lanka 7.2 (44)	Mentone Grammar School, Keysborough
Wed, 9 August 12:45am	Croatia 14.7 (91)	def.	Indonesia 2.0 (12)	Eltham College, Research

	Round 3 - Community Round
Saturday, 12 August 12:00pm	Indonesia 0.2 (2)	def. by	China 10.9 (69)	Diggers Rest Reserve
Saturday, 12 August 12:00pm	Sri Lanka 1.0 (6)	def. by	Croatia 9.5 (59)	Marriott Waters Reserve

==== Pool B ====
#	TEAM	P	W	L	D	PF	PA	%	PTS
1	Japan	3	3	0	0	154	31	496.77	12
2	Germany	3	2	1	0	172	47	365.96	8
3	Pakistan	3	1	2	0	47	125	37.60	4
4	India	3	0	3	0	32	202	15.84	0

	Round 1
Sunday, 6 August 11:15am	Pakistan 0.3 (3)	def. by	Germany 11.5 (71)	Western Oval, Royal Park
Sunday, 6 August 2:45pm	Japan 13.8 (86)	def.	India 0.2 (2)	Western Oval, Royal Park

	Round 2 - School Round
Wed, 9 August 11:00am	Pakistan 2.2 (14)	def. by	Japan 5.3 (33)	Marty Busch Recreation Reserve, Sebastopol
Wed, 9 August 2:30pm	India 1.3 (9)	def. by	Germany 12.14 (86)	Mentone Grammar School, Keysborough

	Round 3 - Community Round
Friday, 11 August 7:30pm	India 3.3 (21)	def. by	Pakistan 4.6 (30)	Golden Square Oval, Bendigo
Saturday, 12 August 2:00pm	Japan 5.5 (35)	def.	Germany 3.5 (23)	Elgar Park

==== Play-Offs ====
	Semi-Finals
SF4: Tues, 15 August 9:30am	Pakistan 2.6 (18)	def. by	Sri Lanka 6.3 (39)	Western Oval, Royal Park
SF3: Tues, 15 August 11:15am	Indonesia 9.11 (65)	def.	India 2.2 (14)	Western Oval, Royal Park
SF1: Tues, 15 August 2:00pm	China 3.4 (22)	def. by	Germany 8.2 (50)	Ransford Oval, Royal Park
SF2: Tues, 15 August 3:45pm	Japan 0.1 (1)	def. by	Croatia 9.12 (66)	Ransford Oval, Royal Park

	Grand Finals
3rd: Friday, 18 August 9:00am	China 4.8 (32)	def.	Japan 3.5 (23)	McAlister Oval, Royal Park
7th: Friday, 18 August 11:45am	Pakistan 6.7 (43)	def.	India 4.2 (26)	Western Oval, Royal Park
1st: Friday, 18 August 12:30pm	Germany 1.2 (8)	def. by	Croatia 11.8 (74)	Ransford Oval, Royal Park
5th: Friday, 18 August 1:30pm	Sri Lanka 7.2 (44)	def.	Indonesia 5.13 (43)	Western Oval, Royal Park

=== Final standings ===
#	DIVISION 1
1	Papua New Guinea
2	New Zealand
3	Ireland
4	United States
5	Nauru
6	(United Kingdom) Great Britain
7	Canada
8	Fiji
9	South Africa
10	France
#	DIVISION 2
1	Croatia
2	Germany
3	China
4	Japan
5	Sri Lanka
6	Indonesia
7	Pakistan
8	India

== Women's Tournament ==
- Canada
- Fiji
- Great Britain
- Pakistan
- (Europe) European Crusaders
- Ireland
- Papua New Guinea
- United States

=== Pool A ===
#	TEAM	P	W	L	D	PF	PA	%	PTS
1	Canada	3	3	0	0	236	18	1311.11	12
2	Great Britain	3	2	1	0	178	58	306.90	8
3	Fiji	3	1	2	0	233	49	475.51	4
4	Pakistan	3	0	3	0	0	522	0	0

	Round 1
Sun, 6 August 8:45am	Great Britain 20.22 (142)	def.	Pakistan 0.0 (0)	Ransford Oval, Royal Park
Sun, 6 August 10:30pm	Canada 1.10 (16)	def.	Fiji 2.3 (15)	Ransford Oval, Royal Park

	Round 2 - School Round
Wed, 9 August 10:45am	Canada 28.18 (186)	def.	Pakistan 0.0 (0)	St. Francis Xavier College, Officer
Wed, 9 August 12:15am	Fiji 3.6 (24)	def. by	Great Britain 5.3 (33)	Peninsula Grammar School

	Round 3 - Community Round
Sat, 12 August 12:00pm	Canada 4.10 (34)	def.	Great Britain 0.3 (3)	Plenty War Memorial Park
Sat, 12 August 12:00pm	Fiji 29.20 (194)	def.	Pakistan 0.0 (0)	Mulgrave Reserve

=== Pool B ===
#	TEAM	P	W	L	D	PF	PA	%	PTS
1	Ireland	3	3	0	0	168	11	1527.27	12
2	United States	3	2	1	0	177	61	290.16	8
3	Papua New Guinea	3	1	2	0	73	103	70.87	4
4	(Europe) European Crusaders	3	0	3	0	0	243	0	0

	Round 1
Sun, 6 August 12:15pm	Papua New Guinea 7.13 (55)	def.	(Europe) European Crusaders 0.0 (0)	Ransford Oval, Royal Park
Sun, 6 August 2:00pm	Ireland 7.4 (46)	def.	United States 1.2 (8)	Ransford Oval, Royal Park

	Round 2 - School Round
Wed, 9 August 10:45am	Ireland 8.13 (61)	def.	(Europe) European Crusaders 0.0 (0)	St. Patrick's, Ballarat
Wed, 9 August 10:45am	United States 5.12 (42)	def.	Papua New Guinea 2.3 (15)	Wesley College, Glen Waverly

	Round 3 - Community Round
Sat, 12 August 12:00pm	United States 19.13 (127)	def.	(Europe) European Crusaders 0.0 (0)	Melbourne University
Sat, 12 August 2:00pm	Ireland 9.6 (60)	def.	Papua New Guinea 0.3 (3)	Hallam Reserve

=== Play-Offs ===
	Semi-Finals
SF1: Tues, 15 August 1:00pm	Canada 6.8 (44)	def.	United States 1.2 (8)	McAlister Oval, Royal Park
SF3: Tues, 15 August 1:00pm	Fiji 12.15 (87)	def.	(Europe) European Crusaders 0.1 (1)	Western Oval, Royal Park
SF2: Tues, 15 August 2:45pm	Ireland 3.5 (23)	def.	Great Britain 2.3 (15)	McAlister Oval, Royal Park
SF4: Tues, 15 August 2:45pm	Papua New Guinea 21.24 (150)	def.	Pakistan 0.0 (0)	Western Oval, Royal Park

	Grand Finals
7th: Fri, 18 August 10:00am	(Europe) European Crusaders 8.16 (64)	def.	Pakistan 1.0 (6)	Western Oval, Royal Park
5th: Fri, 18 August 10:45am	Fiji 1.1 (7)	def. by	Papua New Guinea 5.7 (37)	McAlister Oval, Royal Park
3rd: Fri, 18 August 12:30pm	United States 4.1 (25)	def. by	Great Britain 5.2 (32)	McAlister Oval, Royal Park
GF: Sat, 19 August 4:30pm	Canada 3.3 (21)	def. by	Ireland 4.1 (25)	Etihad Stadium

== World Teams ==
=== Men's World Team ===
AFL International Cup 2017 Men's World Team
B:	(Papua New Guinea) Greg Paul Aki	(Croatia) Josip Habljak	(United States) Ryan Garthright
HB:	(United States) Saleh Tyebjee	(New Zealand) James Kusel	(Papua New Guinea) John James Lavai
C:	(New Zealand) Te Kopa Tipene-Thomas	(United States) Ben Carpenter-Nwanyanwu	(Canada) Eric Klein
HF:	(Nauru) Kenneth Oppenheimer	(Papua New Guinea) John Ikupu	(Germany) Jakob Jung
F:	(Japan) Michito Sakaki	(Republic of Ireland) Padraig Lucey	(United Kingdom) Andrew Walkden
Foll:	(Republic of Ireland) Paul O'Hallaron	(New Zealand) Andrew Howison	(Fiji) Juita Vateitei
Int:	(France) Julien Dagois	(South Africa) Tshoboko Moagi	(China) Shaoliang Chen
Int:	(Republic of Ireland) Fiachra O'Dheasmhunaigh	(Papua New Guinea) Hewago Paul Oea	(New Zealand) Benjamin Hick
Coach:	(New Zealand) Rob Malone, (Papua New Guinea) David Lake		

=== Women's World Team ===
AFL International Cup 2017 Women's World Team
B:	(Fiji) Matelita Tuilevuka	(European Union) Coline Duquet	(Papua New Guinea) Elma Emil
HB:	(Fiji) Litia Matanisigadrau	(United Kingdom) Beth Bailey	(United States) Bevin English
C:	(Republic of Ireland) Carol Breen	(Canada) Lara Hilmi	(Canada) Valerie Moreau
HF:	(United Kingdom) Danni Saulter	(Republic of Ireland) Laura Corrigan-Duryea	(Republic of Ireland) Gillian Behan
F:	(United States) Brette Brower	(Canada) Nicola Kirwan	(Papua New Guinea) Brigid Gaur
Foll:	(Republic of Ireland) Clara Fitzpatrick	(Canada) Aimee Legault	(United Kingdom) Lucy Jones
Int:	(Canada) Hilary Perry	(Republic of Ireland) Colleen Quinn	(United Kingdom) Frankie Hocking
Int:	(Fiji) Salote Matakibau	(Pakistan) Myra Ahmed	(United States) Katie Klatt
Coach:	(Republic of Ireland) Brendan Kelly, (Canada) Jason Arnold		

== See also ==
- Australian Football League
- Australian Football International Cup
- Australian rules football around the world
