= Royal Park, Melbourne =

Urban park in Melbourne, Australia

Royal Park
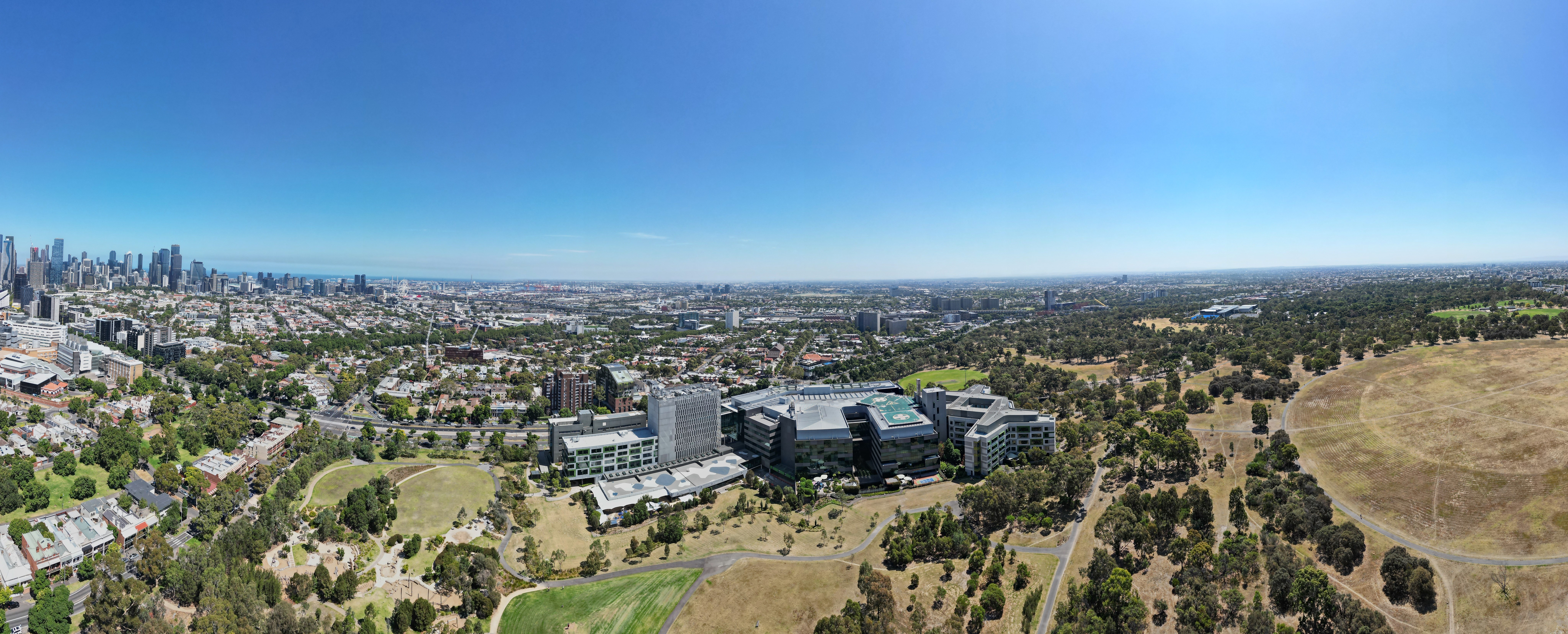
- Aerial panorama of Royal Park. The Melbourne skyline sits on the left of the horizon.

- Location within Melbourne
- Interactive map of Royal Park
- Type: Urban park
- Location: Parkville, Melbourne, Victoria, Australia
- Coordinates: 37°47′24.66″S 144°57′4.20″E
- Area: 169 ha (420 acres)
- Established: 1854; 172 years ago
- Founder: Charles La Trobe
- Operator: City of Melbourne
- Open: 24/7 all year
- Status: Open
- Parking: Available at multiple sites
- Public transit: – Royal Park; –,,, –; – City, Moonee Ponds
- Landmarks: Melbourne Zoo; Royal Park Golf Course; State Netball & Hockey Centre
- Facilities: Barbecues; dog-walking areas; event spaces; 9-hole golf course; nature discovery garden; netball and field hockey indoor fields; playgrounds; picnic facilities; sporting fields; tennis courts; toilets; water fountains; wetland; zoo
- Website: melbourne.vic.gov.au/royal-park

Victorian Heritage Register
- Official name: Royal Park
- Type: Registered place
- Criteria: A, B, E
- Designated: 23 October 2014
- Reference no.: H2337
- Category: Parks, Gardens and Trees
- Heritage overlay no.: HO4

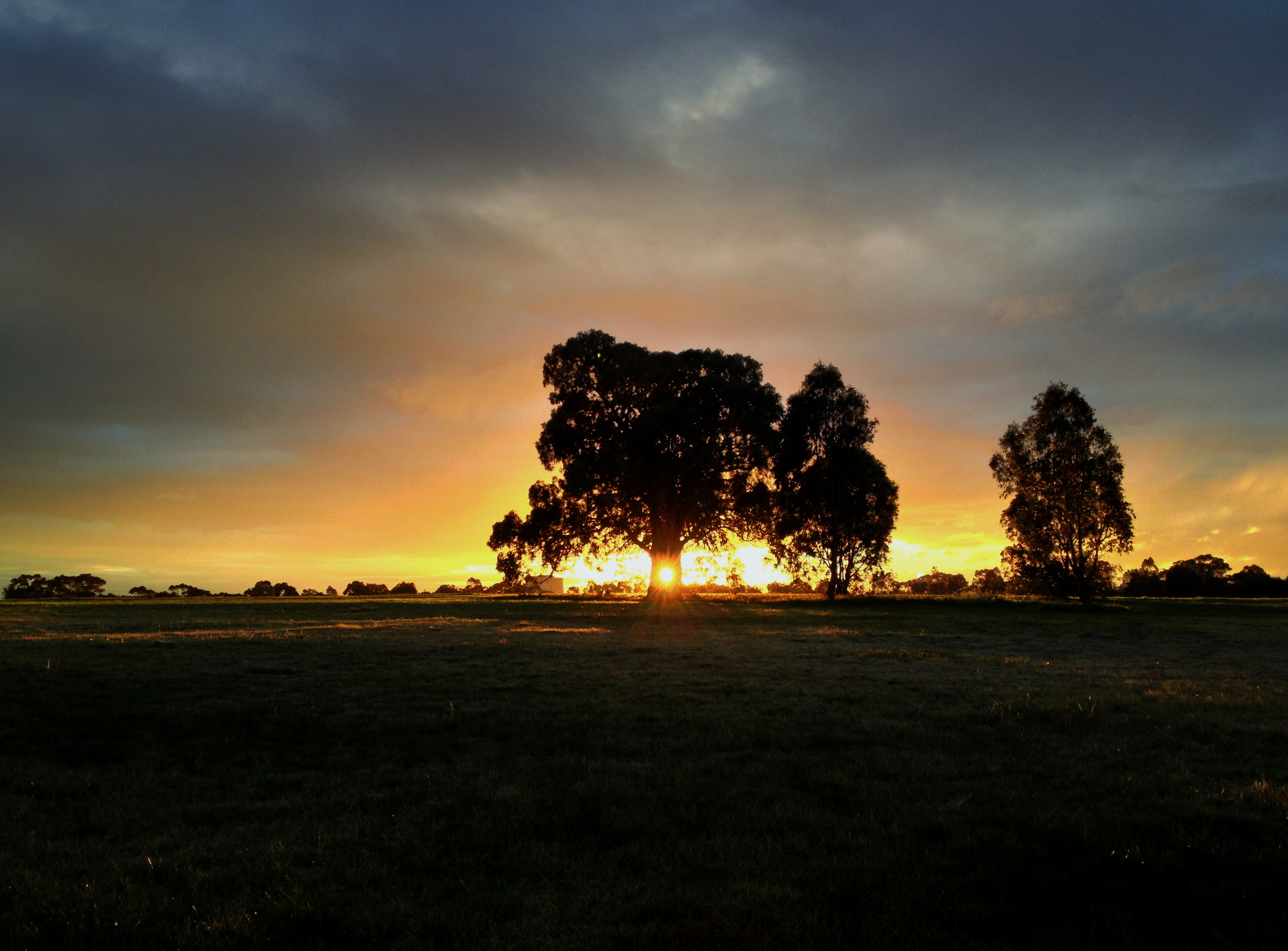
Sunset at Royal Park

The Royal Park is a 169-hectare (420-acre) (Note: The size of the park has altered many times. The November 2024 Draft Master Plan state 169 ha (420 acres); the 1997 Master Plan state 188 ha (460 acres); and the Friends of Royal Park state 155 ha (380 acres).) urban park located in the suburb of Parkville, four kilometres (2.5 mi) north of the Melbourne CBD, in Victoria, Australia. The park is the largest of Melbourne's inner-city parks.

The Melbourne Zoo, established in 1862 as the Royal Melbourne Zoological Gardens, is located on a 22-hectare (54-acre) site within the park. The park includes many sporting facilities including the Royal Park Golf Course, football and soccer ovals, baseball and cricket pitches, State Netball & Hockey Centre, tennis courts, and cycling and walking paths.

On the corner of Gatehouse Street and Royal Parade there is a native garden. There are wide vistas of grassland and lightly timbered areas with eucalypts, casuarina, and acacias. A wetlands area was developed in 2005.

The Melbourne City Council has administered the park since 1934 and operations are informed by a master plan. The park was added to the Victorian Heritage Register on 23 October 2014 in recognition of its historic and aesthetic significance. In 1860, the park was the departure site for the Burke and Wills expedition; and during both World War I and World War II, the park was used as a major military camp, training ground, mobilisation, and deployment site.

The park is located on the traditional lands of the Wurundjeri Woi-wurrung people.

== Features ==
The grassy hill between the Royal Children's Hospital and the Native Garden is ideal for kite flying during the day. Over the summer months, members of the Astronomical Society of Victoria set up telescopes and conduct evening talks and tours of the night sky from this vantage point.

In 2006, as an environmental initiative for the 2006 Commonwealth Games, the 5-hectare (12-acre) Trin Warren Tam-boore wetland was inaugurated, expanded in 2008. The wetland takes stormwater from surrounding suburbs, cleans it, and stores approximately 160 megalitres (130 acre⋅ft) annually, below the Ross Straw Field, to irrigate the park.

=== Wildlife ===
The park is home to many native animals such as possums, and a rich variety of birdlife which includes: Pacific black duck, chestnut teal, white-faced heron, brown goshawk, collared sparrowhawk, Horsfield's bronze cuckoo, Australian hobby, galah, red-rumped parrot, eastern rosella, superb fairy-wren, white-plumed honeyeater, spotted pardalote, white-browed scrubwren, grey fantail and red-browed finch.

The park is home to a regionally significant population of White's skink (Egernia whitii) and a section of habitat is maintained specifically for this species.

=== Sporting fields and facilities ===
The park is home to the State Netball & Hockey Centre, which hosts games in the trans-Tasman netball and international hockey matches. The nine-hole Royal Park Golf Club is notable for being the place where Peter Thomson first learnt his craft.

The park has many open sporting fields including the Brens, Flemington Road, McAlister, Poplar, Ransford, Ryder, Walker East, Walker West, and Western ovals, the Ross Straw Field, and several tennis courts and clubhouses.

== History ==
=== Early history, to 1933 ===
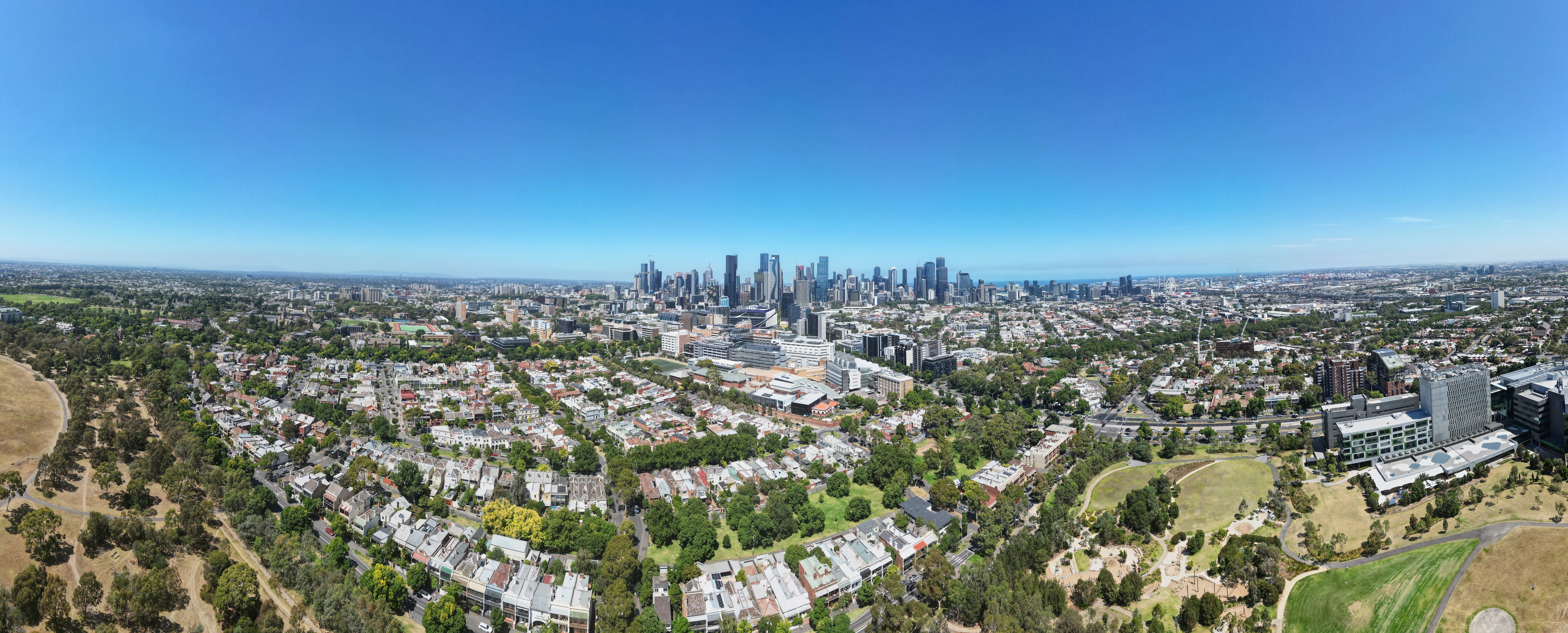
Melbourne city skyline panorama, as seen from Royal Park

In the early years of European settlement Wurundjeri campfires were sometimes seen in the vicinity of Royal Park, although the Yarra people generally preferred camping beside the Yarra River or Merri Creek.

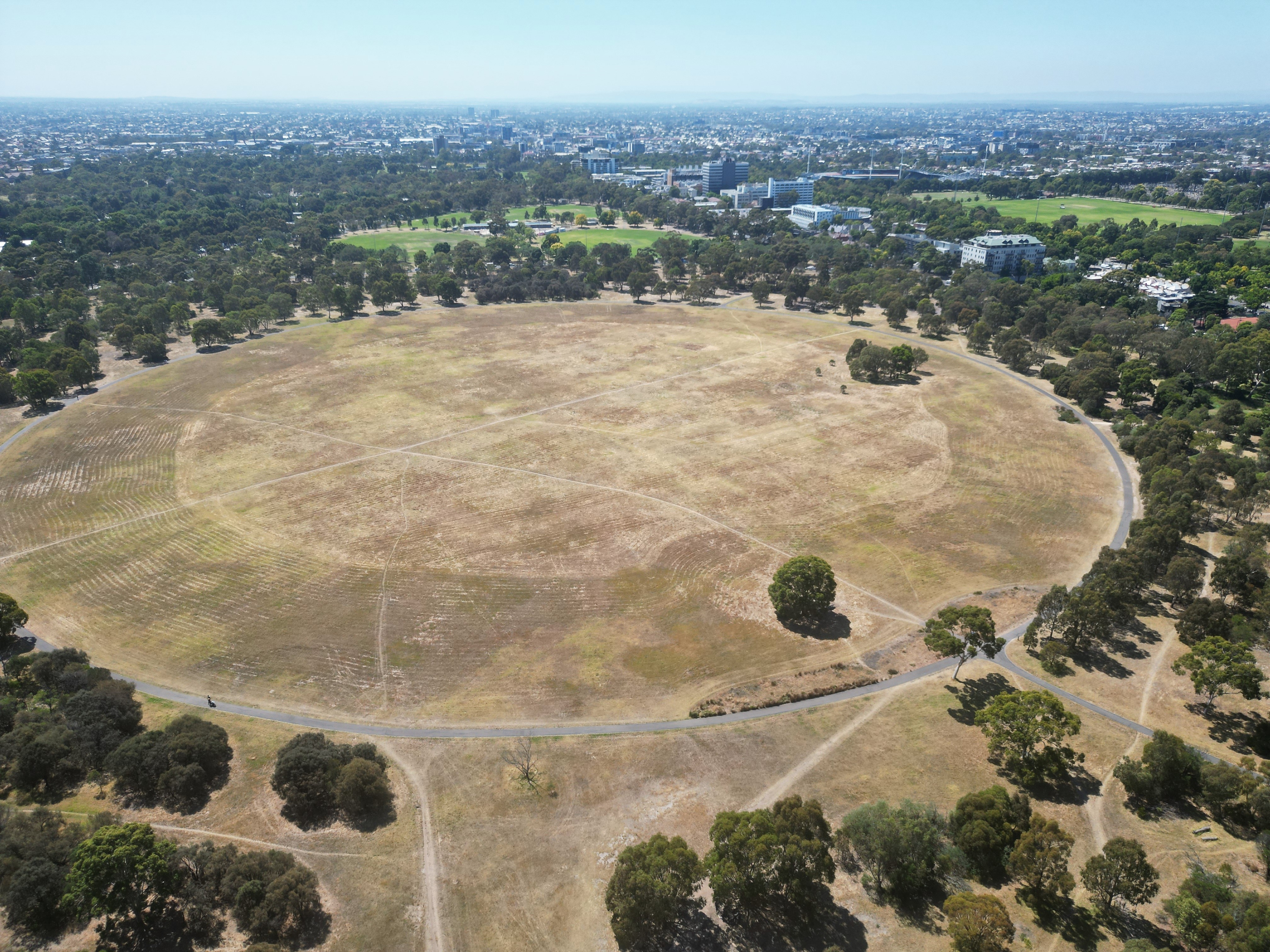
Royal Park's grassland oval from above

In 1850, the Victorian Colonial governor Charles La Trobe set aside 1,040 hectares (2,560 acres) as a reserve for parkland and open space. In 1852, parts of this were sold to become part of the new suburbs of Carlton and North Melbourne. Also that year, some of the land become the Melbourne General Cemetery. 1853 saw part of the reserve become the home of the University of Melbourne.

On 5 May 1854—the last day of La Trobe's service in office—an area of 620 hectares (1,540 acres) was "reserved for public uses within the Colony of Victoria", named "Royal Park". In April 1858, 57 hectares (142 acres) of the Park's north-western corner became an experimental farm. This site later become an orphanage, a homeless refuge, a nursing home, a geriatric rehabilitation facility, and finally a general rehabilitation hospital. It also became the home of CSL in 1919, a year after it was founded.

The reserve was further reduced to 2.83 square kilometres (700 acres) when the rapid increase of population from the Victorian gold rush, led to creation of the suburb of Parkville. A housing estate commenced sales in 1861 at what is now "Parkville South". In 1860 the Burke and Wills expedition set out from Royal Park to cross Australia from south to north. Initially, a tree marked the departure point, later replaced by a cairn. In 1862, Melbourne Zoo was allocated 22 hectares (55 acres).

In 1868 further excisions from Royal Park were made for housing estates at "Parkville North" along Royal Parade and "Parkville West" near Flemington Road. Parkville South was expanded in 1875. Further excisions followed for roads, Upfield railway line (1884), Melbourne Zoo horse tramline (1890), Royal Park psychiatric facility (1907), West Coburg electric tramline (1925), and the University High School (1929). The park was used for military encampments during World War I.

=== Modern history ===
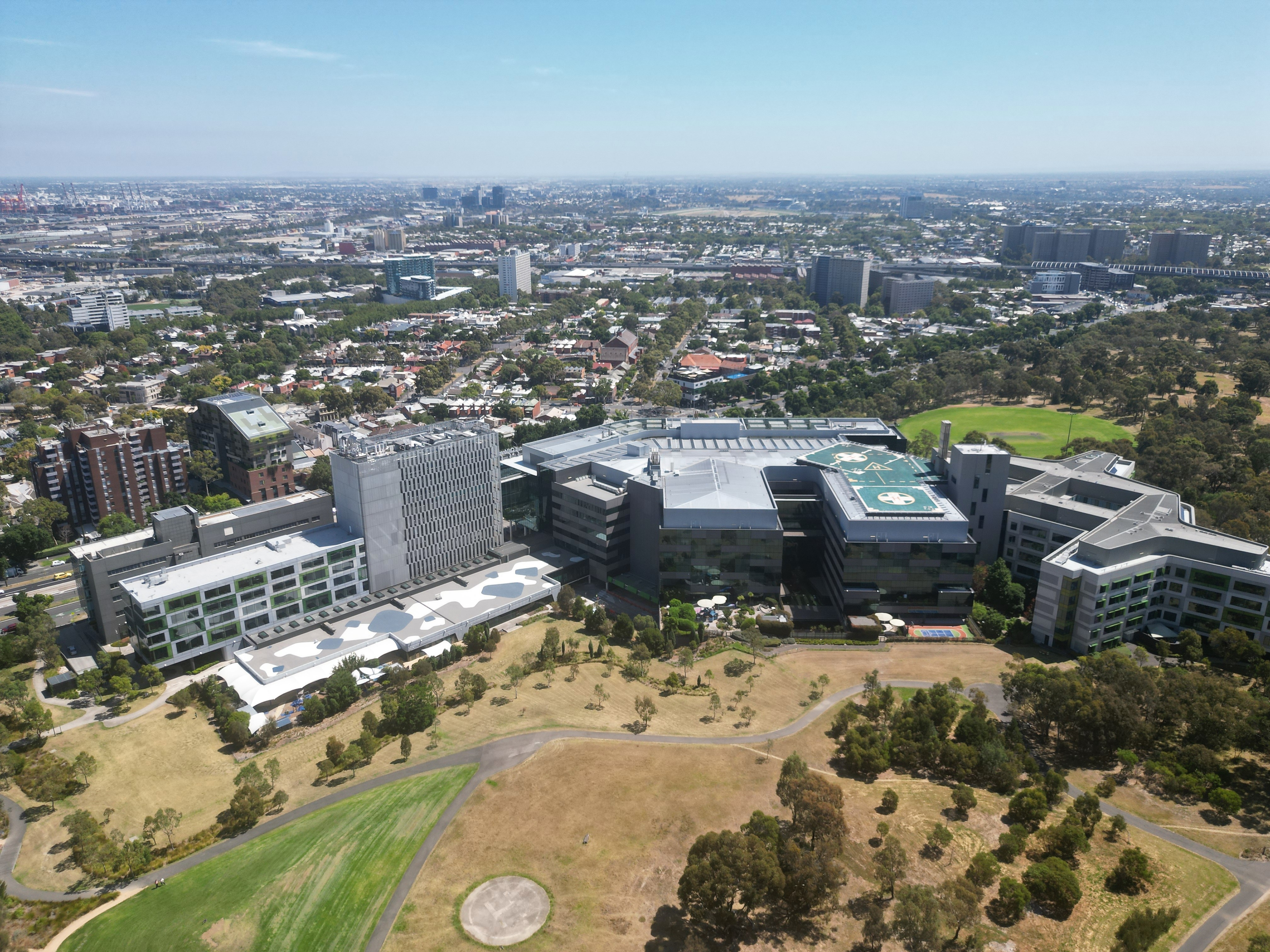
Royal Children's Hospital, viewed from the park

Further excisions occurred including for Camp Pell (1942), the Royal Melbourne Hospital (1944), the Royal Children's Hospital (1957, and returned to parkland in 2013), the Royal Dental Hospital (1963), Melbourne Sports Centre – Parkville (2001), and a relocated Royal Children's Hospital (2007).

The park was used for military encampments during World War II, with Camp Pell being used by United States forces. After the war, the permanent buildings of Camp Pell were used for emergency housing accommodation until 1960. As of 2005, the one existing building from Camp Pell is used as an 'Urban Camp' to provide accommodation for rural school children and other groups when visiting Melbourne.

In 2005 the Bracks government selected an adjacent site in Royal Park to build a new Royal Children's Hospital. Sections of the old hospital were demolished and restored as 4.1 hectares (10 acres) of parklands. Additional facilities, including a new playground, was installed in the park.

==== 2006 Commonwealth Games ====
In 2003, the Bracks government selected the 20-hectare (49-acre) former Royal Park Psychiatric Hospital site, bordering on Moonee Ponds Creek and located adjacent to the park, to house approximately 6,000 athletes during the 2006 Commonwealth Games. After the games, the site developers, Australand and Citta Property Group, were to further develop the site, provide 4 hectares (9.9 acres) for additional parkland, develop 200 homes for public housing and ta 100-bed aged-care facility. Opponents criticised the building of the village citing the destruction of more than 1,000 trees, demolition of four hospital buildings pending a heritage listing, and denigration of the heritage value of the remaining buildings, a lost opportunity to return a development back to public parkland, and privatisation of public lands.

Sporting groups criticised security arrangements for the athletes' village with large sections of the park and sporting grounds having security fencing erected for the exclusive use of athletes. This disrupted many community sporting associations from their regular use of sporting facilities.

== Transport ==
The Upfield railway line travels through Royal Park with Royal Park station being a convenient stop for the Melbourne Zoo.

A light rail for trams runs through the park, which is served by route 58 to both West Coburg and Toorak. The route 19 tram runs up Royal Parade, to the east of the park, which operates northbound to North Coburg, and southbound to Flinders Street station. Two tram routes also run up Flemington Road, to the west of the park. The routes 57 and 59 operate in a northbound direction to West Maribyrnong and Airport West respectively. Both routes operate to Flinders Street station in a southbound direction.

The Capital City Trail for cyclists follows the railway line through Royal Park from the Moonee Ponds Creek Trail at Flemington Bridge, past Melbourne Zoo, and under Royal Parade along the converted Inner Circle railway line to Princes Park.

== Gallery ==
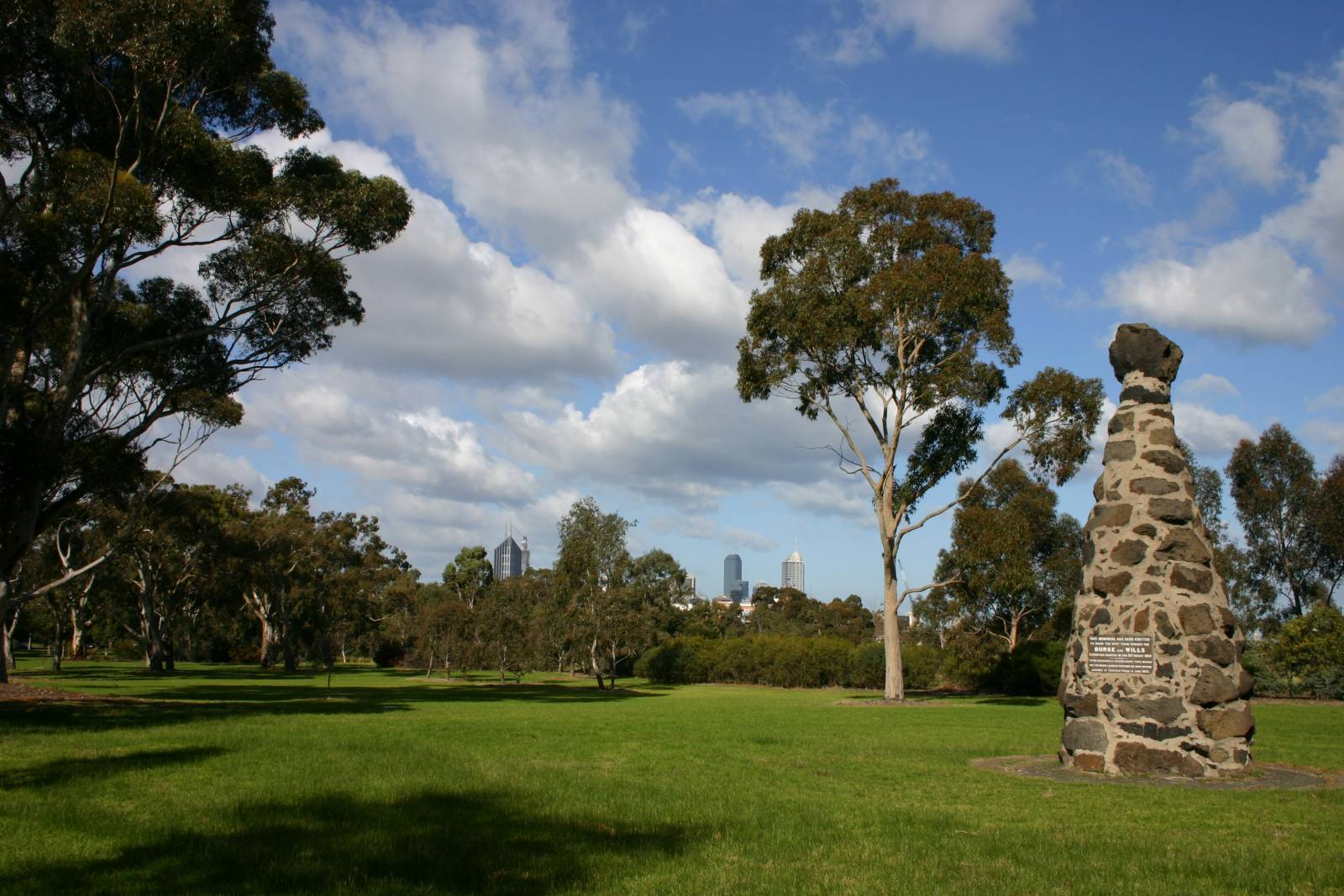
Burke and Wills expedition cairn with the Melbourne skyline

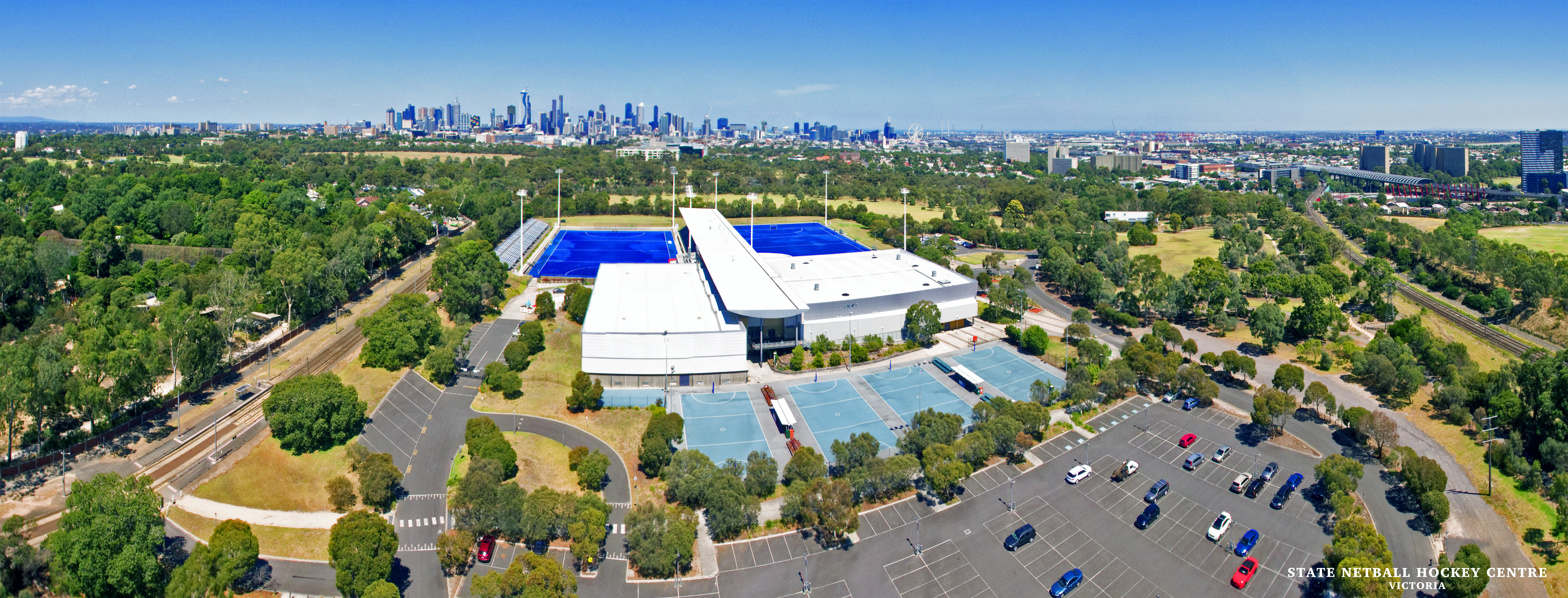
State Netball & Hockey Centre, 2017

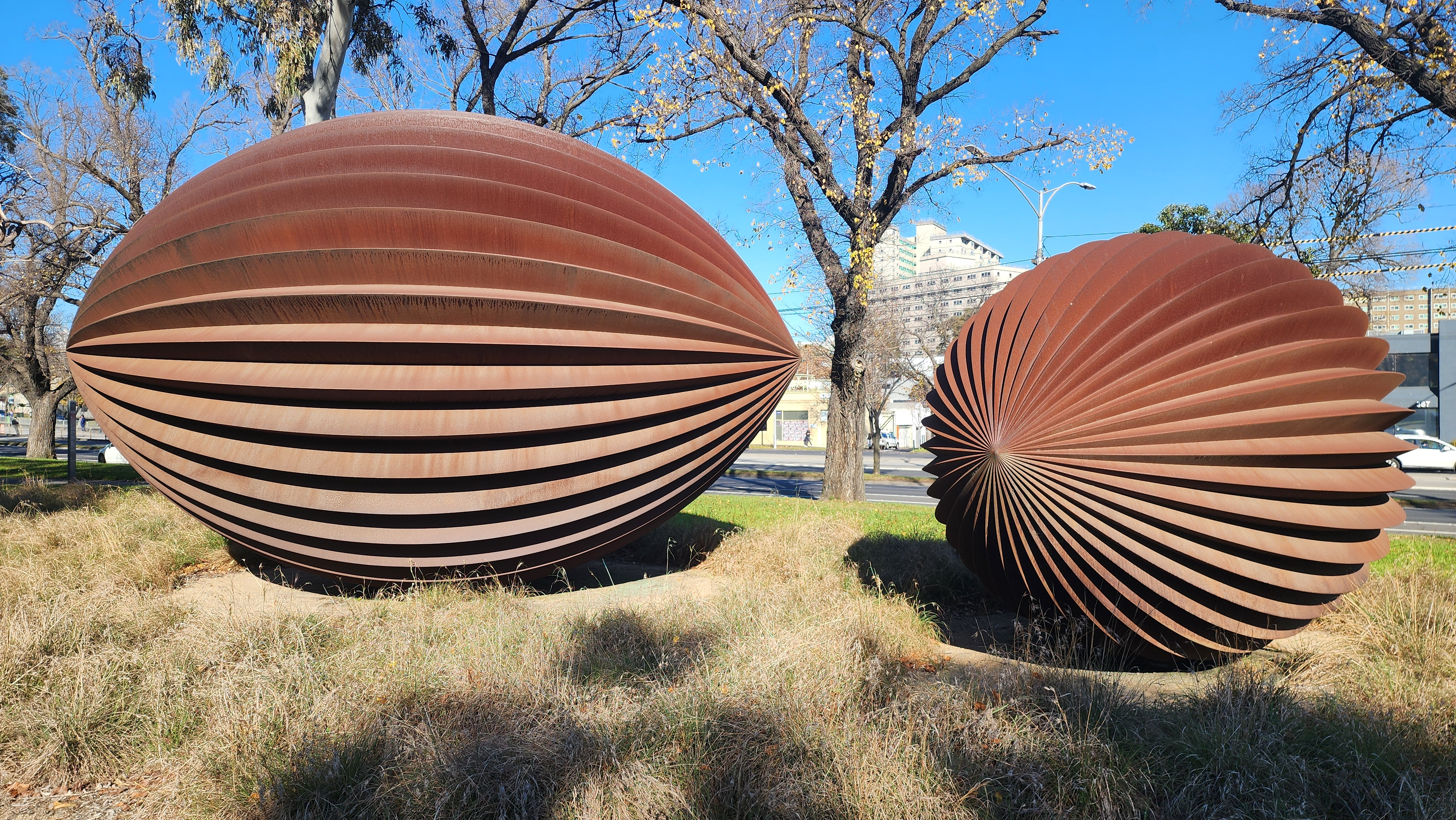
Sculpture in the park, 2024

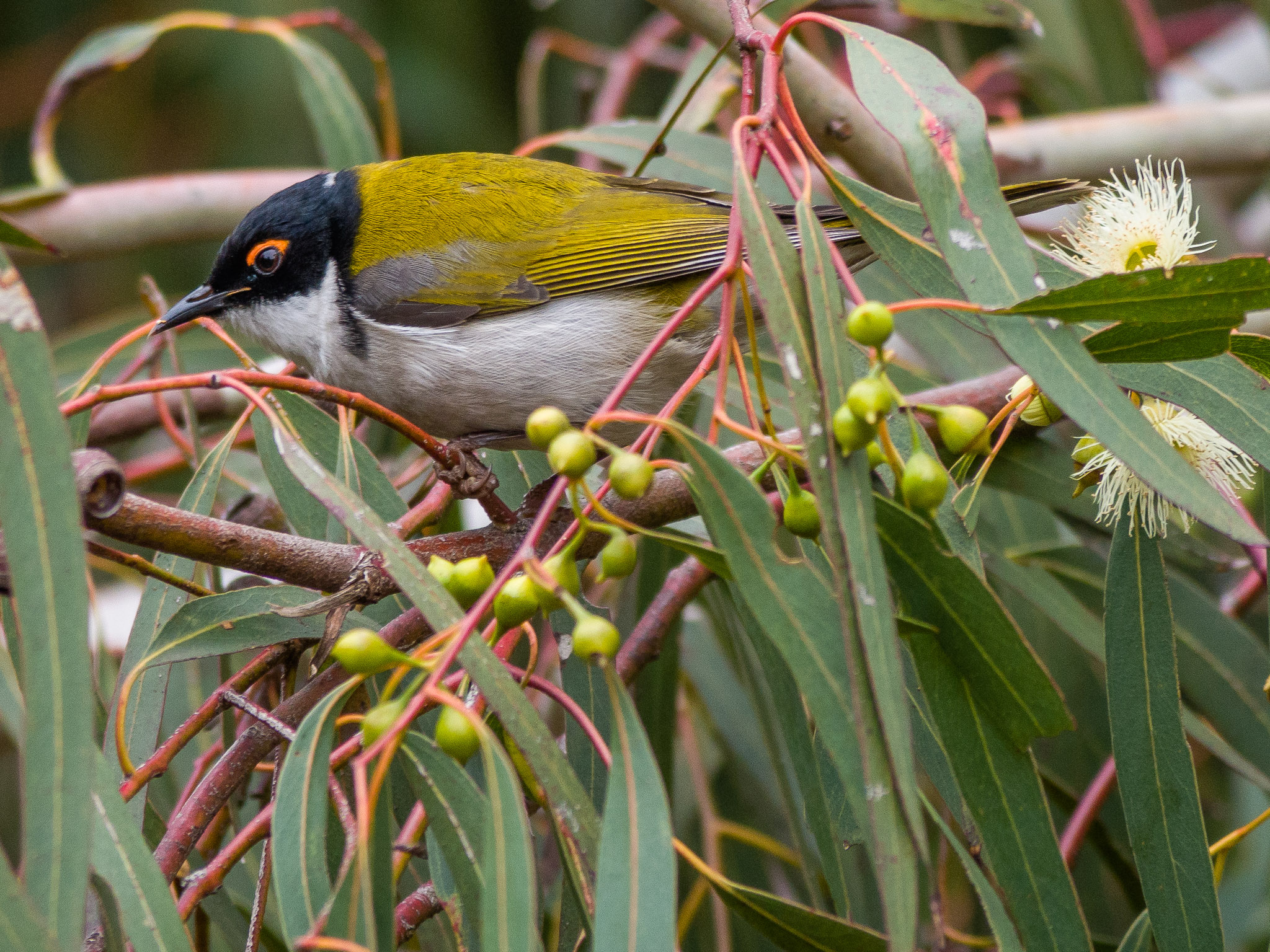
White-naped Honeyeater in the park, 2015

== See also ==
- Parks and gardens of Melbourne
- Heritage gardens in Australia
- List of heritage-listed buildings in Melbourne
