= Australian rules football in Sweden =

- Country: Sweden
- Governing body: AFL Sweden
- National team: Sweden
- Nickname: Elks
- First played: 1993
- Registered players: 393 (total); 257 (adult); 136 (junior)
- Clubs: 9

Club competitions
- Swedish Australian Football League; Stockholm region Australian Football Federation; Danish Australian Football League

Audience records
- Season: Elitserien

Australian rules football has been played in Sweden since 1993, with the game currently played in Helsingborg, Malmö, Lund, Stockholm, Gothenburg, Karlstad, Falun, Norrtälje and Uppsala. A national governing body was formed in 2007 under the name Svenska Australisk Fotbollsförbundet or AFL Sweden.

== History ==
Australian rules football began in Sweden in late 1993 with the creation of the Helsingborg Saints for play in the Danish Australian Football League. They continued as the only Australian rules club in Sweden (excepting the short-lived Lund Bulldogs in 1995) until 2002, when the DAFL was restructured and the Saints were divided into three new clubs, the Port Malmö Maulers, Helsingborg West Raptors and Lund Magpies. After 2005, the three Scania teams became feeders for the South Sweden Saints (changed name back to Helsingborg Saints in 2008), who competed in the DAFL Premier League and reached the 2005 Grand Final.

In 2003 a new club was formed, the Göteborg Berserkers, followed by the Stockholm Dynamite in 2004. The three centres for footy in Sweden continued to operate largely independently of each other, with the Dynamite creating its own three team local league, the Stockholm region Australian Football Federation.

A loose federation calling itself the Swedish Australian Football Association was created, but no real governing body was created until late 2007. The announcement of the creation of the Swedish Australian Football League in 2006 comprises the Scania and Gothenburg clubs, the Stockholm teams remaining separate in the SAFF.

AFLSweden is the official governing body of Australian rules football in Sweden.

== 2015 Elitserien ==
With AFL Sweden working towards being recognised as a sport in Sweden and inclusion into the Swedish 'Riksidrottsförbundet' in 2017, plans were made to expand footy within the country. Part of those plans was the creation of a national competition or the 'Elitserien'. In 2015 the first Elitserien tournament was held over 6 rounds with 4 competing teams: Port Malmö Maulers, Helsingborg Saints, Södermalm Blues and Stockholm Dynamite (Dynamite team composed of players from Solna, Årsta, Bromma and Norrtälje). Each team hosted a double header round as well as a regional derby match. Södermalm Blues, the team with the best record after 6 rounds, were crowned champions.

== E4 Cup ==
The Stockholm Dynamite has competed against the South Sweden Saints (aka Scania Griffins) at least once a year to date since 2004. The Southerners won the first cup in 2004 (surprisingly considering they were thrashed in a practice game earlier in the year) and defended it successfully in 2005. The E4 Cup is named for the E4 motorway connecting the capital with the country's south. This cup has now been replaced by the SAFL regional league.

== National teams ==
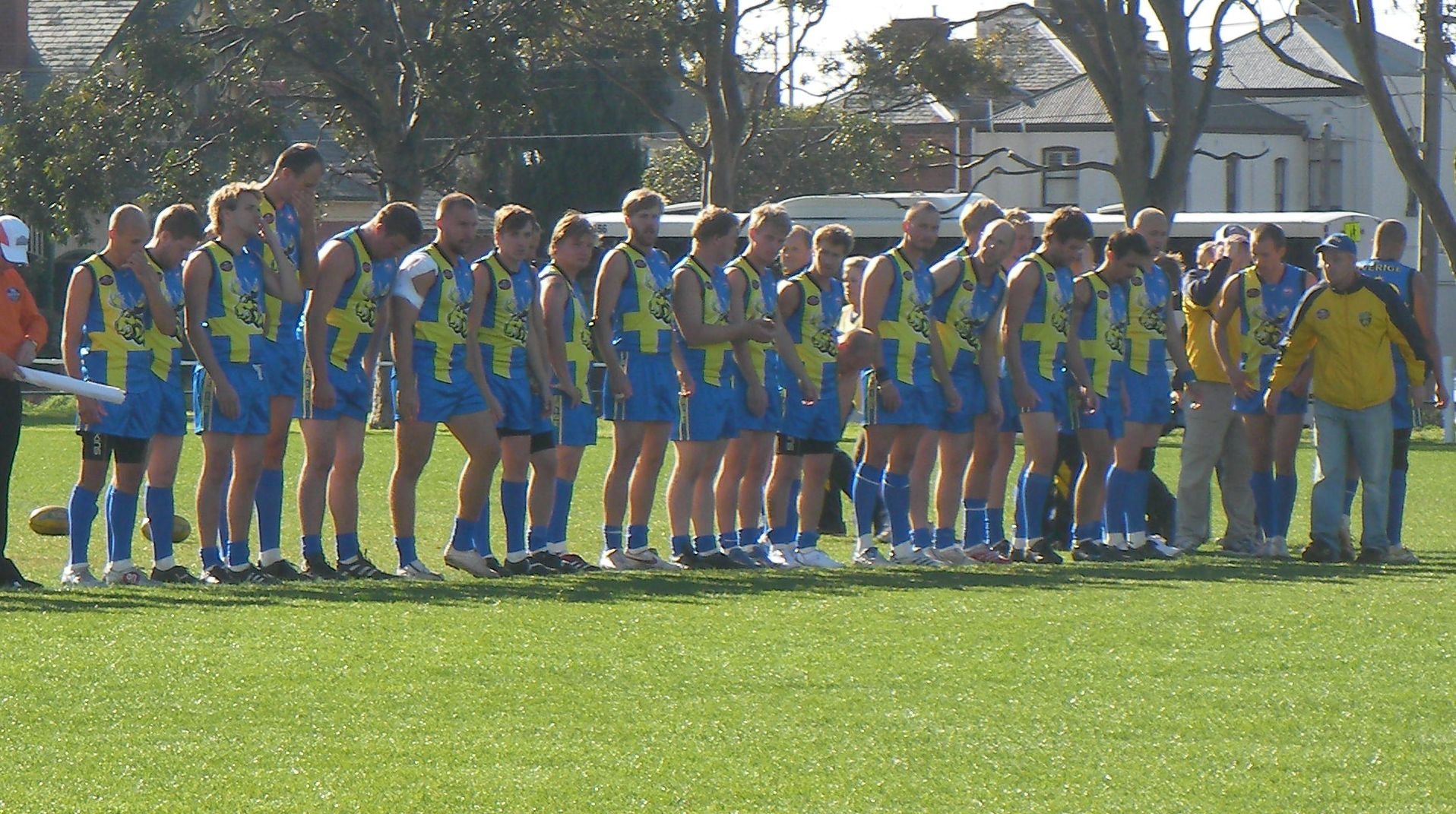
Sweden lining up for the national anthem at the 2008 International Cup in Melbourne

Sweden
- Nickname(s): Elks
- Governing body: AFL Sweden

International Cup
- Appearances: 3 (first in 2008)
- Best result: 11th (2011)

The Swedish men's national team is nicknamed the Elks, drawn from teams across Sweden.

The team wears the national colours of Sweden (represented on the Flag of Sweden). The Elks have worn two different jumpers in international competition, their first being a yellow jumper with a blue V featuring three gold crowns and the Swedish name for Sweden (Sverige) on the belly, and their second being a blue jumper with a yellow Scandinavian cross and Elk logo.

The first appearance of a Swedish national team was in 1997, when the Elks were defeated by Denmark's Vikings in Helsingborg. The next Elks match was in 2004, when the Elks defeated the touring North London Lions by 11 points at Malmö. In 2005, the first test match between Sweden and Denmark is some time was held at Farum, Denmark, with the game played out as a draw. This match consisted of an all-Danish Vikings side, although the Sweden side contained a number of Australians.

At the 2007 EU Cup in Hamburg, Sweden performed very well, eventually winning the tournament. The Elks thrashed Austria by over 100 points in their first group match, then beat France by 41 points to top Pool C. In the quarter-finals, Sweden defeated Pool B runners up the Czech Republic by 31 points. In the semi-finals, they met Pool B champions England. The Swedes ran out 26 point winners, moving onto the final where they would play hosts Germany. In the Final, Sweden won 14.9.93 to Germany 8.5.53. Sweden's Cameron Crooks was Best on Ground.

Strong growth in Sweden has seen the Elks compete at numerous International cups in Australia. In 2008 Sweden was grouped with Canada, Finland and eventual quarter finalists Ireland. The team finished 12th after losing a playoff match against Denmark. In 2011 games were split between two round in Sydney and Melbourne. In round 1 Sweden was grouped together with India and New Zealand. With one loss and one win the Elks were in round 2 placed in a group together with Denmark and eventual winners Ireland. Sweden were not able to win any further group matches but finished strongly against Japan in the 11th/12th playoff game improving their ranking by one place from 2008. 2014 brought about another change in tournament structure. Teams were to play 3 seeding matches before being placed in a division for finals. Sweden lost to New Zealand in their opening match but returned strongly in game 2 to put Finland to the sword. The third seeding game against Canada resulted in defeat placing Sweden in division 2 for the remainder of the tournament. Sweden played off against China and Japan to secure the title as division 2 champions. The Elks did not participate in the 2017 International Cup.

The Swedish women's national team the Ravens was formed in 2015 with the goal of competing in The Afl Europe Euro Cup. While the Raven's first tournament experience was a tough one it set the scene for steady improvement in the years to come.

== Clubs ==
=== National Regional League ===
The Swedish Regional League began in 2007, featuring three sides representing the most established regions for Australian rules in Sweden, the Gothenburg Berserkers, Scania Griffins and Stockholm Dynamite.

=== Gothenburg ===
The Göteborg Berserkers are currently the only Australian rules team in Gothenburg. The Berserkers started training in 2003 and had their first seven-a-side game in late 2003. In 2006, the Berserkers started playing against the Landskrona Bulldozers and Port Malmö Maulers in the Southern Sweden Regional League. The Berserkers wear a black and white striped long sleeve jumper (same as Collingwood Magpies) or a black-red sleeveless jumper. As of 2007, they are competing against Stockholm and Scania in the national regional series.

=== Scania ===
Scania currently has two teams in the Danish Australian Football League (DAFL), the Port Malmö Maulers from Malmö and Helsingborg Saints based in Helsingborg. Feeding into these sides is the four-team Scania League (Skåneligan), featuring the GV Rebels and Malmö Red Eyes in Malmö, Helsingborg West Raptors in Helsingborg and Landskrona Bulldozers representing Landskrona and Lund. The Lund Magpies also competed in the Scania League from 2003–06, former players joining the Bulldozers after the Magpies folded.

The regional representative side is nicknamed the Griffins.

Scania was home to the first Australian football club ever formed in Sweden, the Helsingborg Saints. The club was founded in 1993 by Ingmar 'Terry' Lundquist and Joacim Aulin. The club was almost to be called the Ravens, but the nickname and playing strip of Australian Football League (AFL) club the St Kilda Saints eventually were adopted. From 1994 onwards the Saints competed in the DAFL, and were briefly called South Sweden Saints from 2003–2007. There was also a short-lived club in Lund, nicknamed the Bulldogs, 1995.

For the years 2003 and 2004, the Helsingborg Saints split their squad into three teams for the DAFL's new Scania Conference, these being the Helsingborg West Raptors, Lund Magpies and the Port Malmö Maulers. During this period, the Saints played as Scania in the DAFL's regional league, being a representative team made up of the best players from the three Scanian clubs.

In the 2005 structure for the DAFL the Saints returned, now called the South Sweden Saints and playing in the DAFL Premier League. This season saw the Saints reach the DAFL Grand Final for the second time, again they were soundly defeated by the Farum Cats.

The Port Malmö Maulers were formed in 2003, to play in the Scania Conference of the DAFL. As of the 2005 DAFL restructure, the Maulers are a feeder team for the South Sweden Saints (now called Helsingborg Saints again), who play in the DAFL Premier League. In 2006, with the creation of the Swedish Australian Football League, the Maulers competed in the Southern Sweden regional league, against the Landskrona Bulldozers and the Göteborg Berserkers, and also field two sides in the new Scania league, the Malmö Red Eyes and the GV Malmö Rebels (named for their partner league the Goulburn Valley Football League in Australia. As of 2007, the Port Malmö Maulers compete in the DAFL Premier League. In 2009, they became the first team from outside the Copenhagen area to win the DAFL premiership.

In 2014 the Port Malmö Lynx women's team was born. In 2015 the Lynx played their first matches as Skåne against the Odense Lionesses. The Lynx participated in the AFL Europe Champions league 2106-2109 inclusive placing second in 2016, with respectable placings 2017-2019. Many Lynx players have represented the Swedish Ravens at the European level.

=== Stockholm ===
Logo of the Stockholm Dynamite

Australian rules football in the Stockholm region is governed by the Stockholm region Australian Football Federation (SAFF). The SAFF runs a five-team suburban competition featuring the Bromma Vikings, Solna Axemen, Södermalm Blues, Norrtälje Dockers and Årsta Swans, with a representative team known as the Stockholm Dynamite. The Falun Diggers participated in the 2011 competition but sat out 2012. Players from the SAFF are also eligible for selection to the Swedish national team.

After earlier attempts to start the game of Australian Rules in Stockholm, the first meeting of what was to become the SAFF was held on the 19 December 2003.

Early in April 2004 the Stockholm Dynamite (the new representative side for the SAFF) traveled to Malmö and won a resounding victory in their premier game against a rather depleted South Sweden Saints side. Six weeks later the Dynamite accepted an invitation to play a full-strength team in Helsingborg for the inaugural E4 Cup (named after the major freeway between Stockholm and the south). The match resulted in a four-point win to South Sweden.

In Stockholm a three-team league was established, teams being North, South and Central. After each team completed nine home-and-away games, North defeated Central in the 2004 Grand Final. The Dynamite also travelled to Denmark for the Sheep Station Cup and played an International Rules game against a local Gaelic football club.

In 2005, the Stockholm Australian Football Federation completed its second year. The senior competition again maintained the same three-team, nine-a-side competition, the sides now named the Northern Axemen, Central Royals and Southern Sharks. The Sharks defeated the Axemen for the premiership.

In the eighteen-a-side version of the game, 2005 was a learning curve for the Stockholm Dynamite. The West London Wildcats toured Stockholm in early April, defeating the locals by a good margin.

In the E4 Cup, the South Sweden Saints made the long trek to Stockholm. The Saints proved too strong and controlled the game from the outset. Again there were many encouraging signs with the local players making up 40% of the Stockholm Team. The Dynamite again ventured to Denmark for the Sheep Station Cup, finishing fourth.

With the completion of the 2005 senior competition in September, the SAFF turned its focus to junior development. The SAFF hired a professionally accredited physical education teacher and primary school teacher to co-ordinate Australian Rules Clinics at a number of Swedish schools. The sessions were aimed at children aged 10–16 and were based primarily upon the Auskick program. In all, four schools were involved over 38 hours of clinics and 350 children got the opportunity to kick the Sherrin.

The game of Australian rules football has grown steadily in Stockholm over the past few years with a marked increase in local Swedish players.

=== Middle Sweden ===
2007 saw the formation of three new clubs in middle Sweden, based in the cities of Karlstad, Uppsala and Falun.

=== Participation ===
The AFL International Census in 2007 reported a total of 393 players in Sweden, of which 257 were senior, 58 junior and around 78 participants registered in the Viking footy Auskick like program.

== International Competition ==
=== International Cup ===
- 2002: Did not compete
- 2005: Did not compete
- 2008: 12th
- 2011: 11th
- 2014: 1st in Division 2
- 2017: Did not compete

=== European Championships ===
- 2010: 3rd
- 2013: 4th

=== Swedish Ravens Afl Europe Euro Cup ===
- 2015 Umag Croatia, final place
- 2016 Lisbon Portugal, 4th place
- 2017 Bordeaux France, 3rd place
- 2018 Cork Ireland, 3rd place
- 2019 Norrtälje Sweden, 4th place
