= Australian rules football in Germany =

In Germany, Australian rules football has been played since 1995 and is currently played by nine clubs within the Australian Football League of Germany (AFLG) the governing body. Three clubs run metro leagues. The Dresden Wolves compete in the CAAFL of the Czech Republic and some other formative clubs play on an ad hoc basis within Germany.

The German National side has competed internationally in the Euro Cup since 2005, with its best result being runner up (2nd place). They have also competed in the AFL Europe Championship since 2010, with 3rd place being their best result, and in the 2017 Australian Football International Cup finishing 12th. In addition to playing, Germany has hosted several international events, including the 2007 Euro Cup in Hamburg and the 2023 and 2024 Euro Cups in Kiel .

== History ==
The Frankfurt Redbacks and Munich Kangaroos were founded in 1995 and had been playing since 1996. The AFLG was officially created in 1999, but the two clubs only played occasional matches against each other for the first few years until the formation of the Berlin Crocodiles and the Hamburg Dockers made the possibility of a national league a reality. The German home and away season began in 2003 with these four clubs, Munich winning the premiership.

In 2004 the Düsseldorf Lions (formed in 2002) joined the AFLG, the league having a five-club structure for the following two seasons.

In 2006, a new French side from Strasbourg, the Kangaroos, entered the German league to experience regular league play. The Strasbourg club played under the nickname the "Black Devils" in the German league to avoid a name clash with Munich. At roughly the same time, the Düsseldorf club rebranded to become the Rheinland Lions to reflect a shared home between Düsseldorf and nearby Köln (Cologne).

In 2007 the French team, Strasbourg Kangaroos withdrew from the league to regain strength, leaving five clubs and a 10-game league season plus additional tournaments.

In 2008 a sixth team was formed in Stuttgart, nicknamed the Emus. They joined regular league play in division two in 2009.

=== Divisional Structure 2009 ===
At the end of the 2008 season, the playing standard of the league had progressed to a stage where it was difficult for a new or developing club to compete against the established sides. This was particularly evident in the struggles of the Berlin Crocodiles to remain competitive. Conversely, the larger clubs were seeing an increase in players numbers and were in need of a venue for their reserve players. These factors, combined with the entrance of the Stuttgart Emus into the AFLG, saw the creation of a second division to the league in 2009.

During this season, the league's six clubs fielded eight teams in total across both divisions. Division 1 featured the Frankfurt Redbacks, Hamburg Dockers and the firsts from Munich Roos and Rheinland Lions. Division 2 featured the Berlin Crocodiles, Stuttgart Emus, and the seconds from Rheinland and Munich.

In 2010 the league decided to return to a one-division competition, however with Hamburg declining to field a side, just the five clubs competed in the home-and-away season. Hamburg returned to the main league in 2011, bringing it back to 6 clubs.

== Premierships and Grand Finals ==
- 2003 Munich Kangaroos (no grand final)
- 2004 Frankfurt Redbacks defeated Munich Kangaroos 51–25, Berlin
- 2005 Munich Kangaroos defeated Frankfurt Redbacks 86–4, Frankfurt
- 2006 Munich Kangaroos defeated Rheinland Lions 55–48, Munich
- 2007 Rheinland Lions defeated Munich Kangaroos 85–37, Cologne
- 2008 Rheinland Lions defeated Munich Kangaroos 66–61, Munich
- 2009 Rheinland Lions defeated Munich Kangaroos 87–51, Frankfurt
- 2010 Munich Kangaroos defeated Rheinland Lions 85–31, Berlin
- 2011 Rheinland Lions defeated Berlin Crocodiles 75–24, Stuttgart
- 2012 Munich Kangaroos defeated Rheinland Lions 54–40, Cologne
- 2013 Hamburg Dockers defeated Rheinland Lions 68–55, Hamburg
- 2014 Rheinland Lions defeated Munich Kangaroos 55–44, Fürstenfeldbruck
- 2015 Hamburg Dockers defeated Munich Kangaroos 84–43, Cologne
- 2016 Munich Kangaroos defeated Berlin Crocodiles 139–27, Frankfurt, 10 September 2016
- 2017 Berlin Crocodiles defeated Munich Kangaroos 142–54, Dresden, 16 September 2017
- 2018 Hamburg Dockers
- 2019 Hamburg Dockers defeated Berlin Crocodiles 60–41, Cologne, 7 September 2019
- 2020 (no season due to COVID-19 pandemic)
- 2021 Berlin Crocodiles defeated Hamburg Dockers 91–49, Berlin, 23 October 2021
- 2022 Berlin Crocodiles defeated Hamburg Dockers 116–14, Kiel, 10 September 2022
- 2023 Berlin Crocodiles defeated Munich Kangaroos, Berlin, 7 October 2023
- 2024 Berlin Crocodiles defeated Munich Kangaroos, Stuttgart, 21 September 2024
- 2025 Berlin Crocodiles defeated Munich Kangaroos, Stuttgart, 20 September 2025

== AFLG Men* League history ==
Year	No. teams	Team changes	Winner
1999	2	New: Frankfurt Redbacks, Munich Kangaroos	
2000	2	None	
2001	2	None	
2002	2	None	
2003	4	New: Berlin Crocodiles, Hamburg Dockers	Munich Kangaroos
2004	5	New: Rheinland Lions	Frankfurt Redbacks
2005	5	None	Munich Kangaroos
2006	6	New: Strasbourg Black Devils, Rebrand: Rheinland Lions	Munich Kangaroos
2007	6	None	Rheinland Lions
2008	5	Withdrew: Strasbourg Kangaroos	Rheinland Lions
2009	6	New: Stuttgart Emus	Rheinland Lions
2010	5	Withdrew: Hamburg Dockers	Munich Kangaroos
2011	6	Rejoin: Hamburg Dockers	Rheinland Lions
2012	6	None	Munich Kangaroos
2013	6	None	Hamburg Dockers
2014	5	Withdrew: Frankfurt Redbacks	Rheinland Lions
2015	3	Withdrew: Stuttgart Emus, Berlin Crocodiles	Hamburg Dockers
2016	3		Munich Kangaroos
2017	8		Berlin Crocodiles
2018	7		Hamburg Dockers
2019	7		Hamburg Dockers
2020	-	No season due to COVID-19 Pandemic	-
2021			Berlin Crocodiles
2022			Berlin Crocodiles
2023	8		Berlin Crocodiles
2024	8		Berlin Crocodiles

== National team ==
Germany
- Governing body: AFL Germany

Rankings
- Current: 15th (as of October 2022)

International Cup
- Appearances: 1 (first in 2017)
- Best result: 12th (2017)

The Germany national Australian rules football team is nicknamed the German Eagles, taking the name from the symbol of the Coat of arms of Germany, the Bundesadler (federal eagle).

The first appearance of an all-Germany Australian rules football in Germany national team was in 2006, with the team competing in a tri-nations series against Australian rules football in Denmark national team and Australian rules football in Sweden national team, losing both of their first "test-level" matches.

In 2007 the Germany national team competed in the Tri-Nations series for a consecutive year running against Sweden and Denmark, claiming their first test-level victory over Sweden in Berlin, on 7 July 2007.

The team is yet to make an appearance at the Australian Football International Cup, as the AFLG has stated that the costs involved would be better spent in local development. Informal Germany national AFL teams have also at times competed under the names 'the Blitz' and 'the Eagles'.

The 2007 EU Cup was also hosted by Germany and took place on 15 September in Hamburg with Germany losing the final game against Sweden.

On 11 June 2011 the Eagles defeated the France national team in a friendly game 83:19. The match was held in Paris.

== Clubs ==
There are nine clubs in Germany that compete in the AFLG competition.

=== Frankfurt Redbacks ===
Formed in Frankfurt by Malte Schudlich in 1995, the Redbacks are one of the two oldest Australian rules football clubs in Germany and were a founding member club of the AFLG. They originally wore black jumpers with a vertical red stripe on the front, this has now been changed to red jumpers with a stylised redback spider logo. Their homeground is the Frankfurt Ostpark.

=== Munich Kangaroos ===
The Munich Kangaroos were founded in Munich by Greg Langley in 1994 and was the only German club, except for Frankfurt, formed before the year 2000.

The 'Roos' made an early attempt to start a league based around Munich, named the German Australian Rules Football Association, beginning with two teams -- the Bayern Blues and Munich Whites. This league did not eventuate, with the Roos and Redbacks coming together to form the AFLG in 1999. Munich have played in the AFLG premiership season since the true home and away setup was begun in 2003.

The Munich Roos wear blue and white, the traditional colours of both the AFL North Melbourne Kangaroos and the state of Bavaria (Bayern); Munich is the capital.

In the late 1990s/early 2000s, the Roos would also host the Oktoberfest Cup, which was held during the Oktoberfest.

Bayern League

After the return of the AFLG to a one-league competition in 2010, the Munich Roos found themselves in the position of having a large player group but only limited playing opportunities, especially for players new to the game. Hence a new 9-a-side competition was conceived, dubbed the Bayern League. The league had three foundation clubs: the Pasing Hawks, Schwabing Saints and Sendling Blues, who play home-and-away either on Thursday evenings or Saturday afternoons on non-AFLG game weeks.

Premierships

- 2011 Schwabing Saints (- Sendling Blues, 102-21)
- 2010 Sendling Blues (no Grand Final)

=== Berlin Crocodiles ===
The Crocodiles were formed in Berlin during 2002 as the third Aussie Rules club in Germany, and have played in the AFLG since its home and away seasons began in 2003. The Crocodiles wear green jumpers with a gold yoke and a gold crocodile logo. Their home games were originally played in the Treptower Park, although they moved to their training base Schiller Park, where they hosted the 2004 and 2010 AFLG Grand Final tournament. In the 2011 season most homegames were played at the Maifeld next to the Olympic Stadium. Sportanlage Jungfernheide is the current homeground of the Berlin Crocodiles.

Berlin League The Berlin Crocodiles host an internal competition throughout the season at their training base in Shillerpark. The teams are intergender and are made up of members of the Berlin Crocs Men* and FLINTA* squad. The league consists of:

- North Berlin Crows Wear Navy, Yellow and Red

- East Berlin Mariners Wear Purple, White and Red

- South Berlin Giants Wear Orange and Charcoal

- West Berlin Eagles Wear Yellow and Blue

=== Hamburg Dockers ===
The Hamburg club formed in 2003 by Fabian Cordts, joining the AFLG in that season. The club considered a number of names, including the Hamburg Foxes, but being located in Germany's largest port city eventually settled on the name Hamburg Dockers. Ironically, they wore the jumpers of the Fremantle Dockers' biggest traditional rivals, the West Coast Eagles, for the first two years of existence, finally receiving a set of Fremantle's all-purple alternative jumpers for the 2005 season.

The Hamburg Football Club went through its first two seasons in the AFLG winless, but started their 2005 campaign in fine fashion with their first-ever win - a 155–23 away drubbing of the Düsseldorf Lions, becoming a strong footballing outfit over the course of their third season.

After a year off in 2010, the Dockers came back for the 2011 AFLG Season. Their rebuilt team saw two victories at the end of the 2011 season, defeating the Frankfurt Redbacks and Stuttgart Emus.

=== Rheinland Lions ===
The Lions were formally established for AFLG league play in 2004 in Düsseldorf under the name Düsseldorf Lions. Previously, they had competed on an irregular basis, their first appearance being a tournament called the Rhein Cup on 31 August 2002 against Berlin Crocodiles and Frankfurt Redbacks. They also hosted the 2004 CEAFL Championships.

As of late 2005, the Lions changed their name to the Rheinland Lions – as a large proportion of their playing squad live in the nearby cities of Cologne or Bonn rather than Düsseldorf. They have also for this reason started playing their home games in Cologne. Cologne and Düsseldorf have a traditional rivalry and the name change to a neutral title may help avoid these rivalries in regional recruiting efforts.

For their first match they wore the black rugby jumpers from the Düsseldorf Dragons Rugby union Club. Their current jerseys are red and white, featuring a black, encircled lions head.

In 2015 the Lions became the first German Team to compete in the AFL Europe Champions League. They managed to become 2nd best just beaten by the West London Wildcats.

=== Stuttgart Giants ===
Based in Stuttgart, Baden-Württemberg, the Stuttgart Giants formed in 2018 when the Stuttgart Emus and Freiberg Taipans merged.

=== Dresden Wolves ===
The team was founded in 2013 by Christoph Odenthal and played in the Prague League for two years before joining AFLG in 2015.

=== Kiel Koalas ===
The Kiel Koalas are the league's northern-most team, situated in the sailing-city of Kiel. The club helped to host the 2023 and 2024 Euro-Cup tournaments.

=== Heidelberg Knights ===
The Heidelberg Knights are a division of the Heidelberg RGH Rugby Club.

=== Further Clubs ===
At the moment, the following clubs do not participate in the AFLG:

- Leipzig Quokkas

=== Former clubs ===
==== Stuttgart Emus ====
The Emus were created in 2008, with players taking part in matches with other German teams. Their first appearance as a stand-alone club was in the 2008 AFLG finals tournament, where they played a match against the 5th-placed German side, Berlin. They established themselves in 2009's second division, coming in third place and showing some strong games, such as against later champion Berlin when they lost only by one goal. The consolidation continued again in season 2010, where they came in fourth place, beating the oldest German AFL team - Frankfurt - twice. The Emus wear the colors green and white.

==== Freiberg Taipans ====
Since 2018 the Taipans and the Stuttgart Emus play together as the Stuttgart Giants.

== See also ==
- Australian rules football
- Australian rules football in Europe
