= Australian rules football in Tonga =

- Country: Tonga
- Governing body: Tonga Australian Football Association
- National team: Tonga
- First played: 1985, Haʻutu-Fāhefa, Tongatapu
- Registered players: 150 (total); 50 (adult); 100 (junior)

National competitions
- Tonga Australian Football Association

Australian rules football in Tonga has its origins in local schools the 1980s, but has been played on an organised basis only since 2003, when the game's governing body, the Tonga Australian Football Association was founded.

There are currently approximately 150 or more Tongans regularly playing Australian rules football.

Tonga's senior team competed internationally at their 2011 Australian Football International Cup debut achieving the highly creditable position of ninth out of 18 teams defeating many more fancied teams.

== History ==
The first Australian rules football believed to have been played in Tonga was during the Christmas break of 1985–1986, when a Melbourne teacher named Denis Towers visited the country briefly with his Tongan-born wife, and played the game with some 40 Tongan men from the local villages of Hautu-Fahefa on the grounds of the local primary school.

Further, during the late 1990s, Ewen Gracie, a former Melbourne primary school and sports teacher, also spent a few years employed at Liahona High School, in Tonga, during which time he also made time to teach young Tongans the skills of the Australian football game.

A schools competition has been played yearly since then, including a tour to Samoa. Development officers from Australia have visited to islands to assist in creating development programs.

=== Tonga Australian Football Association ===
In 2003, the Tonga Australian Football Association was founded by Tim Valente and Mark Korsten, Australian expatriates.

In 2006 the first TAFA PTH junior scholarship was awarded to Alex Fungavaka who was placed at Norwood Morialta High School in Adelaide.

In 2023, numbers were increasing under development officer Malakai Mahina with sending a view to sending national teams to the 2024 International Cup.

== International competition ==
Tonga
- Nickname(s): Black Marlin
- Governing body: AFL Tonga

Rankings
- Current: Not ranked (as of October 2022)

International Cup
- Appearances: 2 (first in 2011)
- Best result: 6th (2014)

The senior men's representative team is known as the Black Marlins and hosted Australian amateur team the Fitzroy Reds in late 2006. A team representing the Melbourne Tongan community also competed at the 2004 Australian Football Multicultural Cup.

Although the Black Marlins could not commit to the full draw of the 2008 Australian Football International Cup, the Tongan side did arrive in Australia and participate in the multicultural division of the competition against Team Africa.

== Notable players with connections to Tonga ==
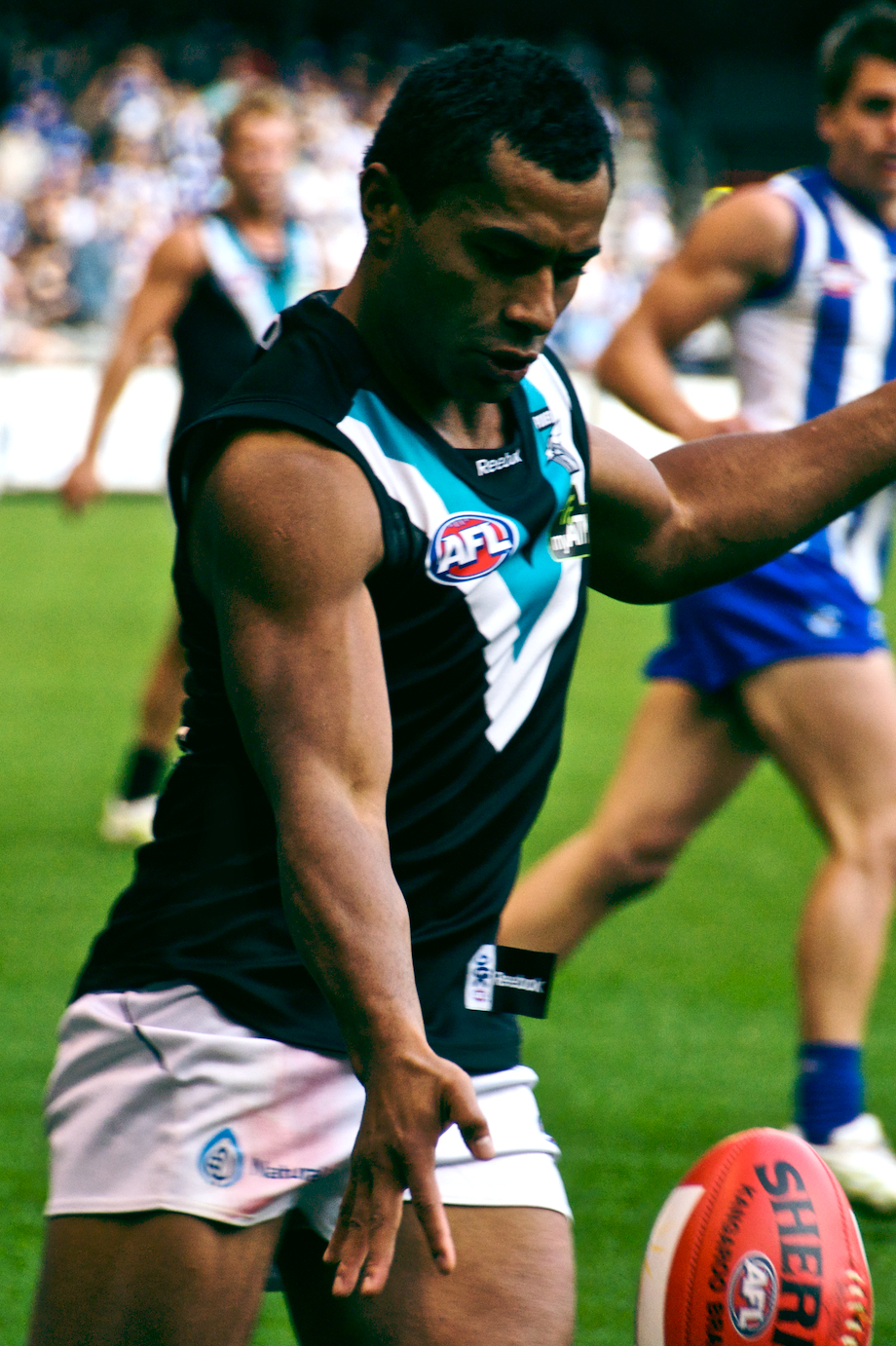
David Rodan playing for Port Adelaide

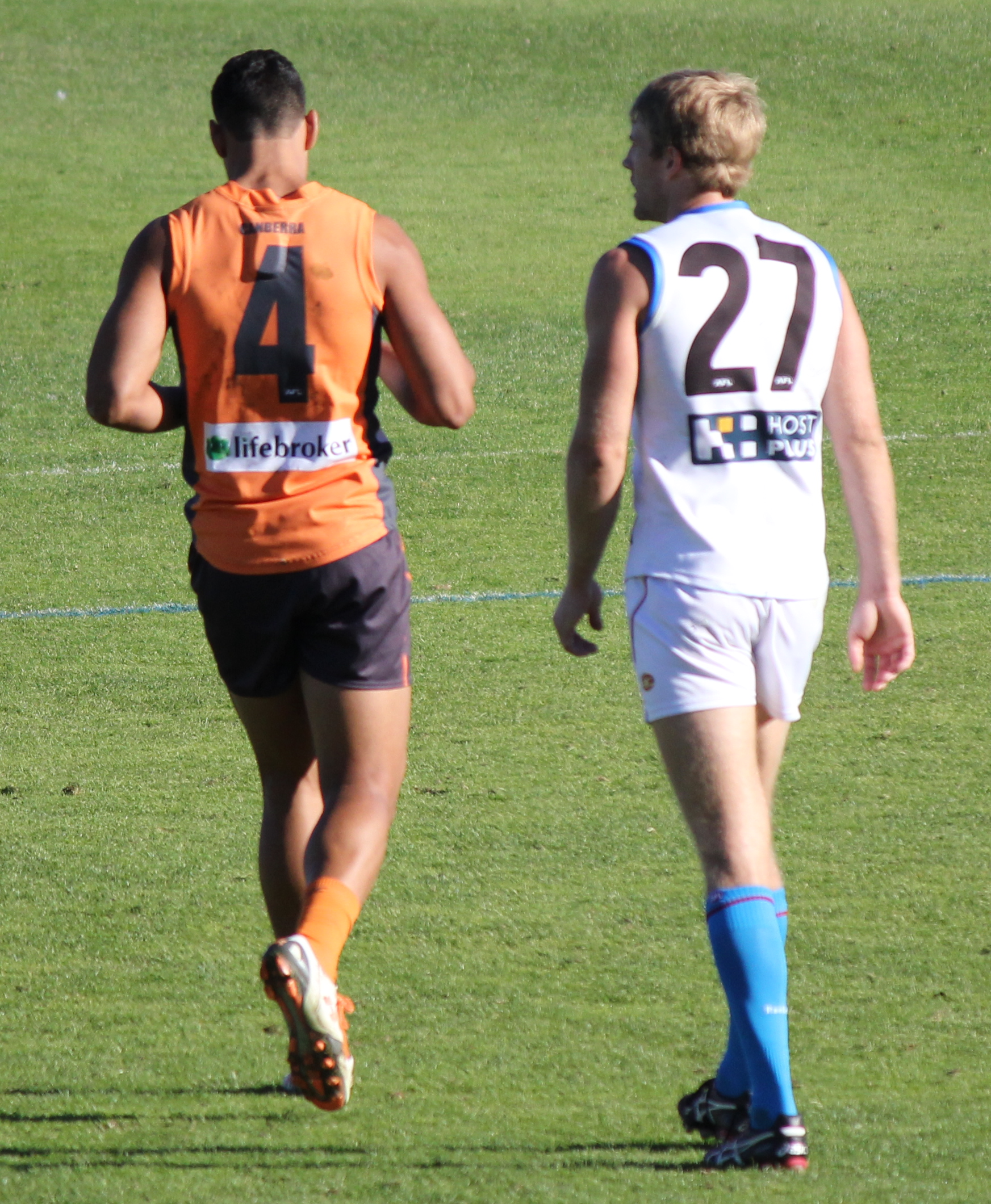
Israel Folau (left) playing for the Giants

Currently on an AFL senior list

Player	Connection to Tonga	AFL Years*	AFL Matches*	AFL Goals*	Notes
Paul Curtis	Mother	2022-	35	26	
Israel Folau	Both parents	2011 - 2012	13	2	
David Rodan	Both parents	2002 - 2013	150	131	
Fatui Ataata	Born	1983-1988	-		35 games in the Collingwood Football Club reserves between 1983-8.
