= International Australian Football Council =

Australian rules football

The International Australian Football Council (IAFC) was a body established in 1995 to govern the sport of Australian rules football internationally. It was established by a small number of amateur football bodies.

The IAFC was established after the Arafura Games, held in Darwin, Northern Territory, Australia.

The Arafura Games were the first international games to have Australian rules football as a competition, rather than a demonstration sport. Papua New Guinea won the Gold medal that year and retained it in subsequent games. The national delegations that fielded Australian rules football teams met and decided to form a central body to co-ordinate efforts to promote the game in their own nations. The IAFC was founded as a result of this meeting, the first president being Will McKenzie (New Zealand).

The IAFC helped organise the first Australian Football International Cup in Melbourne in 2002 which was won by Ireland.

As the primary rulemaker in Australia, the Australian Football League (AFL) refused to recognise the IAFC's role to govern the rules of the code internationally (given that it was primarily responsible for small amateur competitions). As a response, the AFL brought on its own international game development initiatives and funding, limiting the scope and purpose of the IAFC to a promotional body. In line with these initiatives, many leagues around the world formally affiliated with the AFL and the AFL negotiated the unanimous voluntary dissolution (by member country vote) of the IAFC at the end of 2002 in a successful attempt to gain the status of world governing body.

By 2004, the AFL formed its own International Policy, the first of its kind since the formation of the IAFC and became formally recognised as the world governing body for the sport. The AFL has stated that it does not see the need for a FIFA style governing body until at least 2050.

== Splinter group ==
Some individual members of the IAFC voted to continue under the IAFC banner as the "International Australian Football Confederation". Board members included Ron Barassi, Allen Aylett and Brian Dixon. This organisation was not recognised by the AFL. It instigated the Multicultural Cup competitions in 2004 and 2005, involving expatriate communities living in Australia, of which Israel won the first, while Greece won the second. It also played a role in organising the first EU Cup. This organisation eventually changed its name to Aussie Rules International (ARI) and later Australian Football International (AFI), which functions only as a development and promotional body.

== Predecessors ==
The first Australasian Football Council was formed in Melbourne in 1883 to take control of all intercolonial representative matches, 21 years before FIFA was founded. However, the right for the council to the laws of the game was challenged in 1894 by the Victorian Football Association, the premier league at the time, resulting in its dissolution.

In 1905, an official Australasian Football Council was formed, after delegates from the North and South Islands of New Zealand became involved. Unlike its predecessor, this body maintained control of the game internationally until 1995, when its right to govern the code was similarly challenged by the premier competition, the Australian Football League. The AFC is in no way related to the International Australian Football Council, although the principle is the same.

== See also ==
- AFL Commission
- Australian Football International
- List of Australian rules football leagues outside Australia
