= IAFC =

IAFC may refer to:

- International Association of Fire Chiefs
- International Australian Football Council
