= United States national Australian rules football team =

United States national Australian rules football team may refer to:

- United States men's national Australian rules football team
- United States women's national Australian rules football team
