= United States women's national Australian rules football team =

United States
- Nickname(s): Freedom
- Governing body: Women's Australian Football Association
- Head coach: Leigh Barnes
- Captain: Judith Stein

Rankings
- Current: 7th (as of October 2022)

First international
- United States 49 – 0 Canada (2007)

International Cup
- Appearances: 3 (first in 2011)
- Best result: 3rd (2011, 2014)

The United States women's Australian Rules football team, also nicknamed USA Freedom represents the United States in the sport of women's Australian rules football.

The USA Freedom was founded in 2007 as the USAFL Women's National Team. The team has played numerous matches against the Canadian Northern Lights in both the US and Canada. The team first formed to compete against Canada at Thunderbird Stadium in Vancouver 2007.

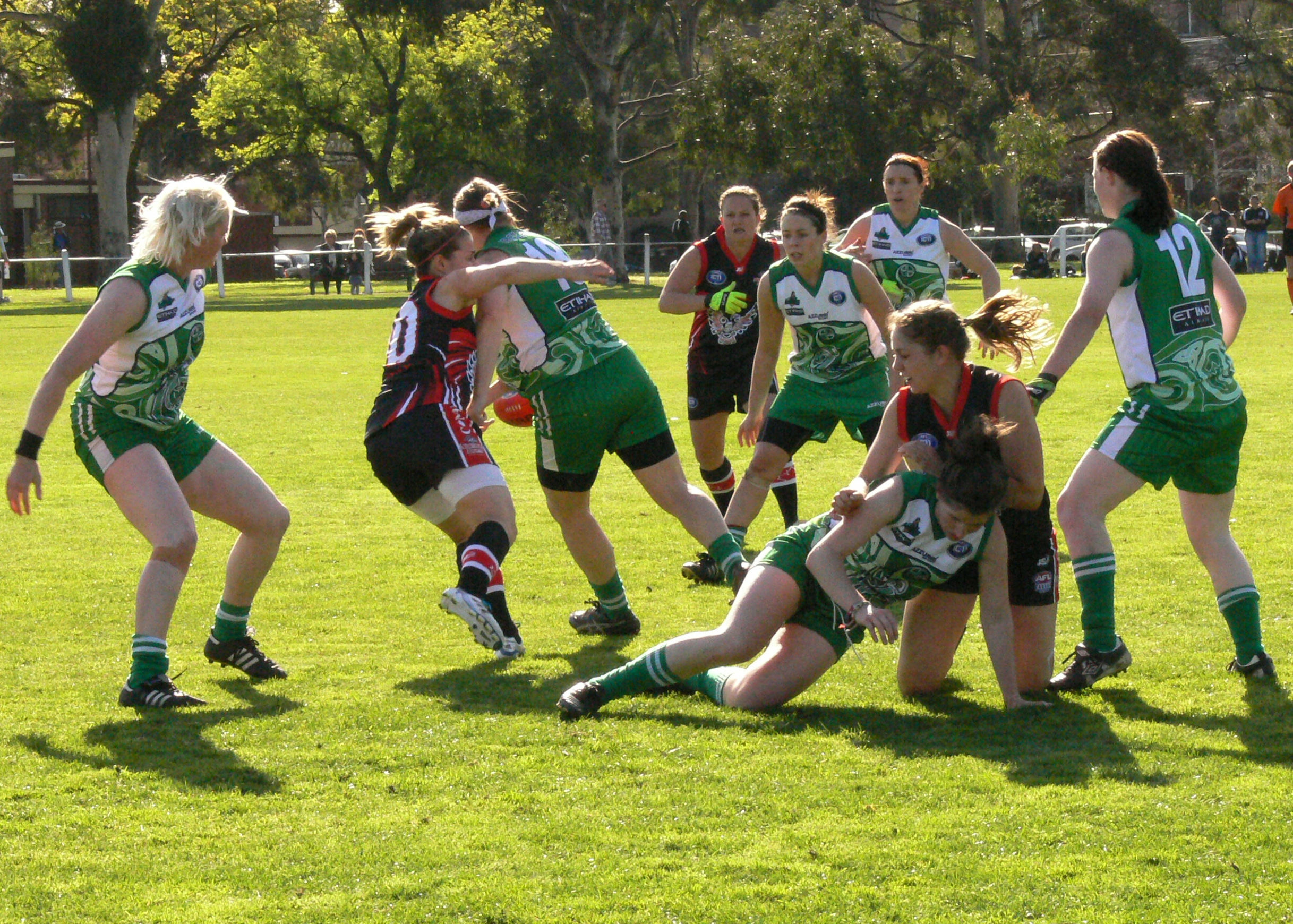
USA Freedom competing against Ireland's Banshees in the women's division of the 2011 Australian Football International Cup

The Freedom was the first International women's team to travel to Australia on a 2009 tour of the country playing against teams in Sydney, Melbourne, Country Victoria and Cairns in Far North Queensland.

The inaugural coach of the USA Freedom, Wayne Kraska of Atlanta, stepped down from the position at the end of 2010 with Leigh Barnes of San Francisco picking up the reins.

The Freedom competed in the first ever women's division of the AFL International Cup in Sydney and Melbourne during August, 2011 finishing in 3rd place.
