= Australian Football International Cup =

Australian rules football competition

- Sport: Australian rules football
- First season: 2002
- No. of teams: 2017: 18 men's & 8 women's
- Country: Host: Australia
- Most recent champions: Papua New Guinea (men) (Republic of Ireland) Ireland (women)
- Most titles: Papua New Guinea (men; 3 titles) (Republic of Ireland) Ireland (women; 2 titles)
- Broadcaster: YouTube
- Website: AFL International Cup

The Australian Football International Cup (also known as the AFL International Cup or simply the IC) was a triennial international tournament in Australian rules football. It was the biggest international tournament in the sport that is open to all nations (it is not called a World Cup as Australia does not compete due to the presence of the professional AFL competition and an abundance of semi-professional leagues). More than 26 nations have participated and the competition has expanded into multiple pools and both men and women's divisions. At the time of the last tournament in 2017, the sport had a record 170,744 registered players outside Australia (upwards of 23 per cent of total registered players worldwide) growing at a rate of 25 per cent per annum (as compared to an Australian participation growth rate of 10 per cent).

The 2020 event was postponed and then cancelled due to the COVID-19 pandemic and after multiple subsequent postponements for both the 2020 and 2023 tournaments, the AFL put the International Cup on hiatus, sponsoring regional tournaments in 2024 exclusive for nations affiliated with the AFL, including the AFL Transatlantic Cup.

The inaugural 2002 tournament was organised by the first world governing body, the International Australian Football Council. With the AFL Commission assuming control over the game internationally, since 2005 it has been run by the Australian Football League (AFL)'s game development arm. The IC Grand Final of each men's tournament has been held at the Melbourne Cricket Ground as a curtain raiser to an AFL premiership season match. Though it is run under the banner of the AFL Commission, the AFL's official Laws of the Game are not used, an Amateurs variation is instead applied, acknowledging the primarily amateur composition of the competition and that players are not paid for participating.

Although the competition has grown, its status has remained low for more than two decades, and the arrangement has been criticised due to the focus on domestic competition; the AFL's commitment to fund and promote the sport internationally has also been questioned. The international governing body has itself cited "the significant investment required from the AFL to host the event" as a primary reason for its ongoing postponement, and after multiple subsequent postponements for both the 2020 and 2023 tournaments, the AFL put the International Cup on hiatus, sponsoring regional tournaments in 2024 exclusively for nations affiliated with the AFL. The Commission stated that it would "continue to review its ability" to stage the tournament in future. Competition scheduling discourages it as a standalone spectator event with few pool matches played at stadiums; matches are generally played on weekdays during business hours and rarely with access to ticketed admission, allocated seating, or covered areas. The event and matches receive very little if any promotion. Though a few blockbusters have been played as curtain raisers to AFL matches, they are generally not advertised and attract mostly neutral observers as they filter in early for the main event the record for which was 76,703 at Papua New Guinea vs New Zealand at the 2008 IC Grand Final there for the 2008 AFL Second Qualifying final. Despite the limited accessibility for spectators some regional matches played on weekends have attracted significant attendances, with the current attendance record of 5,000 at The Showgrounds, Wangaratta.

Eligibility rules are very strict compared those of other international competitions. Generally speaking, players must be citizens of the country they represent and have lived there through roughly middle school and high school ages (when most players usually learn the key skills required). IC criteria ensures that expatriate Australians, Australians with overseas ancestry and those who moved to Australia at a young age are ineligible to compete (with the exception of the short-lived and unsuccessful women's Indigenous & Multicultural (OzIM) composite amateurs team in 2011). These rules, combined with professional contracts and limited pathways for players, typically preclude professional players from participating. In addition, there is a per-team cap on players registered with Australian clubs. Despite this, since the 2011 competition, the cup has featured a number of AFL-listed internationals and rookies; however, these players had to first negotiate a release from their AFL/AFLW contracts before being nominated and are not paid for their appearances. To date, three players have played senior matches at the highest level in both competitions – the amateur IC and professional club competition: Hewago Oea (Papua New Guinea/AFL), Laura Duryea (Ireland/AFLW) and Clara Fitzpatrick (Ireland/AFLW). Likewise, the tournament forms a pathway for international players to the AFL, with numerous players having been rookie-listed by AFL clubs after their performances in the competition.

== History ==
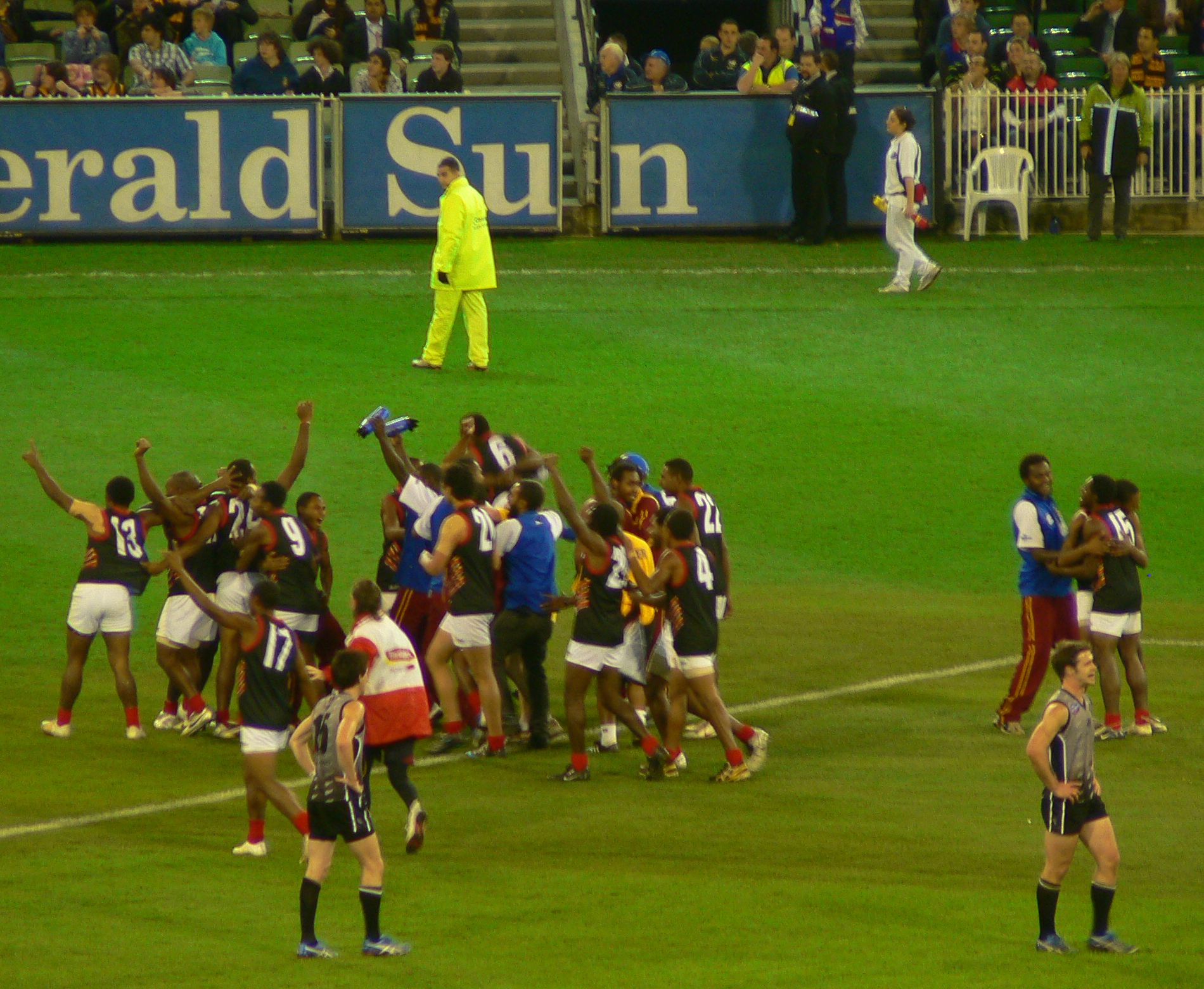
- PNG at the Melbourne Cricket Ground celebrating their 2008 Australian Football International Cup victory

When the International Australian Football Council was formed in 1995 one of its aims was to 'establish and promote an official World Cup of Australian Football'. At the time it was thought that 2008, being the 150th anniversary of the game, was the appropriate date.

However, in 1999 a proposal was received from the New Zealand Australian Football League (NZAFL), suggesting that the World Cup be brought forward to 2002. This was accepted by the council and, following visits to many countries, IAFC public relations officer Brian Clarke drafted a discussion paper and draft regulations for circulation to the various national bodies.

An approach was then made to the AFL, asking for their support in staging the event. The AFL agreed on the basis that the event was renamed the "International Cup". An organising committee, chaired by Ed Biggs and including AFL and IAFC representatives, was then appointed.

The inaugural competition, the 2002 Australian Football International Cup, was held between 14 August and 23 August 2002 (in conjunction with the International Australian Football Council), with eleven countries competing including Canada, Denmark, Ireland, Japan, Nauru, New Zealand, Papua New Guinea, Samoa, South Africa, the United Kingdom, and the United States. All matches were played in Melbourne at mainly second tier suburban and Victorian Football League home grounds. Ireland defeated Papua New Guinea in the final at the Melbourne Cricket Ground.

The second cup in 2005 was run by the AFL's Game Development arm, as the IAFC had been dissolved. It saw the addition of Spain but the withdrawal of Denmark and Nauru for financial reasons. While most of the venues were similar to 2002, it was the first tournament to have matches held outside Melbourne, with the Victorian city of Wangaratta hosting one of the later rounds. New Zealand won their first championship.

The third cup in 2008 saw a record sixteen nations with China, India, Sweden, Finland and a combined Israel-Palestine side (known as the Peres Peace Team) debuting. Tonga entered as a seventeenth team, but as they were unable to commit to the full draw they played a series of multicultural exhibition matches against Team Asia and Team Africa, sides drawn from Melbourne's migrant communities. Like the previous cup, the 2008 event had some matches played outside of Melbourne with the western Victorian city of Warrnambool billed as the co-host and other games being held in Geelong and at Royal Park, Melbourne, featured as a primary venue in subsequent Cups. Papua New Guinea, which had advanced to the Grand Final in both previous tournaments, won its first title.

The fourth tournament, the 2011 Australian Football International Cup, was the first to play matches outside of Victoria, with Sydney being billed as co-host. Blacktown International Sports Park and suburban grounds hosted some of the early round matches and a historic first international at ANZ Stadium between the USA and South Africa played as a curtain raiser to a Sydney Swans AFL match. A record eighteen nations competed, and a women's division was competed for alongside the men's competition for the first time. It was the first tournament to feature a side from Australia, the OzIM women's team, composed of amateur indigenous and multicultural players, however the team did not perform well. It was also the first tournament to be split into divisions, seeded from an opening round lighting-style format similar to the 2011 NAB Cup. The tournament saw the addition of teams from Fiji (who went on to take out Men's Division 2), France and Timor-Leste. Tonga, who had previously withdrawn, also competed but Finland and Samoa did not send teams. Ireland won the title in both men's and women's divisions.

The 2014 Australian Football International Cup saw a significant increase in international and media interest. Once again, eighteen teams competed. The Israel-Palestine combine was no longer represented and Denmark announced a return to its domestic game development policy. Indonesia and Pakistan made debuts in their place. As in previous tournaments, one of the rounds was played outside of Melbourne, with matches played at suburban grounds in Melbourne along with regional matches at Bendigo, Ballarat and Geelong. South Africa, Fiji and France were the standout improvers. Papua New Guinea regained their title in the men's, winning their second title in five tries, while Sweden finished top of Division 2. Fiji and Tonga debuted in the women's division and the United States and Canada both fielded two women's teams making a record seven teams. Canada achieved a historic first ever title in the women's, defeating Ireland at Punt Road Oval.

The 2017 Australian Football International Cup once again featured eighteen men's teams, including debutante Sri Lanka, reflecting the game's growth in the Indian subcontinent. European teams were finding travel difficult, with northern European nations Finland, Denmark and Sweden (Sweden having competed in both the 2016 Europe Championships and also Denmark in the 2016 and 2017 EU Cups) pulling out, though Croatia and Germany made solid debuts. For the first time, the men's divisions were determined prior to the tournament instead of preliminary matches. Two themed rounds were featured: the School round, where matches were played at Victorian schools, and the Community round, as in 2014 where matches were played at suburban grounds in Melbourne and Geelong. Papua New Guinea won back-to-back men's titles, Croatia won a historic first Division 2 title. In the women's, Great Britain, Pakistan and the European Crusaders joined a record field of eight teams with no nations fielding more than one team. Ireland regained its women's title over Canada at Docklands Stadium in the first women's grand final match played as an AFL curtain raiser.

The 2020 International Cup was scheduled for 21 July – 8 August in Sunshine Coast, Queensland. It was initially postponed until 2021 due to the COVID-19 pandemic before being cancelled altogether in 2021. Prior to the tournament several changes had been announced. Criteria were made more strict, reducing the number of Australian based players allowed to compete. New Zealand announced the planned entry of its first women's team. The AFL had, for the first time, announced capping the men's competition to sixteen teams and the women's to eight.

In August 2021, the AFL announced that the IC would return in 2023 to align with its original three-year schedule but did not announce the host. On 22 April 2022, the AFL announced it was postponing the International Cup until 2024 citing "significant investment required from the AFL to host the event". However, on 24 July 2023, the AFL announced that, in lieu of the International Cup, that it would be sponsoring three regional events in 2024: the Trans-Atlantic Cup, the Asia Cup, and the Pacific Cup to be hosted by an international affiliate. The AFL gave no indication as to when the International Cup would be resumed, however indicated that these are the only AFL sanctioned international tournaments since 2017 (effectively nullifying the 2019 and 2022 AFL Europe Championship). AFL Canada was announced as host of the Transatlantic Cup to be held at the Humber College Oval at Colonel Samuel Smith Park in Toronto on August 2–11, The Maroochydore Multi Sports Complex on the Sunshine Coast, Queensland was announced as the host of the Pacific Cup on 14–24 November. Thanh Long Sports Center in Vietnam would host the Asia Cup at in Ho Chi Minh City from December 6–8 in 2024. The AFL announced strict selection criteria, that each player must hold citizenship for the country that they are representing and must have played in from a local competition in that country.

== Men's International Cup ==
Flag(s)	Nation(s)	Moniker	2002 (11)	2005 (10)	2008 (16)	2011 (18)	2014 (18)	2017 (18)
(Canada)	Canada	Northwind	9th	7th	6th	10th	5th	7th
(China)	China	Dragons	-	-	15th	17th	16th	13th
(Croatia)	Croatia	Knights	-	-	-	-	-	11th
(Denmark)	Denmark	Vikings	4th	W/D	11th	8th	-	-
(Fiji)	Fiji	Tribe	-	-	-	13th	10th	8th
(Finland)	Finland	Icebreakers	-	-	14th	-	15th	-
(France)	France	Les Coqs	-	-	-	14th	11th	10th
(Germany)	Germany	Eagles	-	-	-	-	-	12th
(United Kingdom)	Great Britain	Bulldogs	6th	6th	9th	7th	9th	6th
(India)	India	Bombers	-	-	16th	16th	18th	18th
(Indonesia)	Indonesia	Garudas	-	-	-	-	17th	16th
(Republic of Ireland)	Ireland	Warriors	1st	4th	4th	1st	2nd	3rd
(Israel) (Palestine)	Israel-Palestinian territories	Peres Team for Peace	-	-	13th	15th	-	-
(Japan)	Japan	Samurais	10th	9th	8th	12th	14th	14th
(Nauru)	Nauru	Chiefs	8th	W/D	5th	6th	7th	5th
(New Zealand)	New Zealand	Falcons	3rd	1st	2nd	3rd	3rd	2nd
(Pakistan)	Pakistan	Dragoons	-	-	-	-	12th	17th
(Papua New Guinea)	Papua New Guinea	Mosquitoes	2nd	2nd	1st	2nd	1st	1st
(Samoa)	Samoa	Kangaroos	7th	5th	10th	-	-	-
(South Africa)	South Africa	Lions	11th	8th	3rd	5th	4th	9th
(Spain)	Spain	Bulls	-	10th	-	-	-	-
(Sri Lanka)	Sri Lanka	Lions	-	-	-	-	-	15th
(Sweden)	Sweden	Elks	-	-	12th	11th	13th	-
(Timor-Leste)	Timor-Leste	Crocs	-	-	-	18th	-	-
(Tonga)	Tonga	Tigers	-	-	W/D	9th	6th	-
(United States)	United States	Revolution	5th	3rd	7th	4th	8th	4th
"W/D" = Withdrew from the tournament without playing a match after officially committing to field a side that year.

=== Division 1 Grand final and third place playoff results ===
Prior to 2011, all men's teams competed in one division.

Year	Host	Grand Final match			Third Place Playoff match			Number of teams
Year	Host	Winner	Score	Runner-up	3rd place	Score	4th place	Number of teams
2002; Details	Melbourne	Ireland	7.9 (51) - 2.7 (19)	Papua New Guinea	New Zealand	3.7 (25) - 2.4 (16)	Denmark	11
2005; Details	Melbourne, Wangaratta	New Zealand	7.8 (50) - 5.2 (32)	Papua New Guinea	United States	10.5 (65) - 4.6 (30)	Ireland	10
2008; Details	Melbourne, Warrnambool	Papua New Guinea	7.12 (54) - 7.4 (46)	New Zealand	South Africa	4.9 (33) - 5.2 (32)	Ireland	16
2011; Details	Melbourne, Sydney	Ireland	8.5 (53) - 5.5 (35)	Papua New Guinea	New Zealand	12.4 (76) - 6.5 (41)	United States	18
2014; Details	Melbourne	Papua New Guinea	6.9 (45) - 6.6 (42)	Ireland	New Zealand	6.8 (44) - 6.7 (43)	South Africa	18
2017; Details	Melbourne	Papua New Guinea	4.5 (29) - 4.4 (28)	New Zealand	Ireland	7.6 (48) - 2.4 (16)	United States	18
2020	Sunshine Coast	Cancelled			Cancelled			—N/a
2023	Sunshine Coast	Cancelled			Cancelled			—N/a

=== Overall tournament results ===
Sorted by winning percentage, with draws counted as half a win, half a loss, and percentage (points for/points against x 100).

Pos	Nation	P	W	L	D	PF	PA	%	PTS	%W
1	New Zealand	33	28	5	0	2536	711	356.68	112	84.85
2	Papua New Guinea	32	27	5	0	2404	852	282.16	108	84.38
3	Croatia	5	4	1	0	334	72	463.89	16	80
4	Ireland	33	26	7	0	1840	810	227.16	100	78.79
5	United States	33	21	12	0	2010	1050	191.43	84	63.64
6	Nauru	26	16	10	0	1671	1056	158.24	64	61.54
7	Germany	5	3	2	0	230	143	160.84	12	60
8	Tonga	11	6	5	0	697	450	154.89	24	54.55
9	Samoa	17	9	8	0	783	652	120.09	36	52.94
10	South Africa	32	16	16	0	1372	1503	91.28	64	50
11	Canada	33	15	18	0	1332	1043	127.71	60	45.45
12	Fiji	16	7	9	0	899	538	167.10	28	43.75
13	Denmark	16	7	9	0	699	728	96.02	28	43.75
14	(United Kingdom) Great Britain	32	14	18	0	1219	1334	91.38	56	43.75
15	Sri Lanka	5	2	3	0	153	227	67.40	8	40
16	China	21	8	13	0	490	1488	32.93	32	38.10
17	Sweden	16	6	10	0	448	1086	41.25	24	37.5
18	(Palestine) Israel-Palestinian territories	11	4	7	0	344	744	46.24	16	36.36
19	Japan	32	11	21	0	1001	1806	55.43	44	34.38
20	France	16	5	11	0	589	962	61.23	20	31.25
21	Pakistan	10	3	7	0	259	651	39.78	12	30
22	Indonesia	10	3	7	0	274	854	32.08	12	30
23	Finland	10	2	8	0	148	786	18.83	8	20
24	India	21	1	20	0	279	1831	15.24	4	4.76
25	Timor-Leste	6	0	6	0	107	529	20.23	0	0
26	Spain	6	0	6	0	58	391	14.83	0	0
Table includes finals and has been adjusted to reflect this.

==== Overall tournament placings ====
Pos	Nation	Champions	Runners-up	Third	Fourth
1st	Papua New Guinea	3 (2008, 2014, 2017)	3 (2002, 2005, 2011)		
2nd	Ireland	2 (2002, 2011)	1 (2014)	1 (2017)	2 (2005, 2008)
3rd	New Zealand	1 (2005)	2 (2008, 2017)	3 (2002, 2011, 2014)	
4th	United States			1 (2005)	2 (2011, 2017)
5th	South Africa			1 (2008)	1 (2014)
6th	Denmark				1 (2002)

== Women's International Cup ==
	Nation	Moniker	2011 (5)	2014 (7)	2017 (8)
(Australia)	Indigenous and Multicultural Australia	OzIM (Australia Indigenous & Multicultural)	5th	-	-
(Canada)	Canada	Midnight Suns	-	4th	-
(Canada)	Canada	Northern Lights	2nd	1st	2nd
(Europe)	Europe	European Crusaders	-	-	7th
(Fiji)	Fiji	Vonu	-	5th	6th
(United Kingdom)	Great Britain	Swans	-	-	3rd
(Republic of Ireland)	Ireland	Banshees	1st	2nd	1st
(Pakistan)	Pakistan	Shaheens	-	-	8th
(Papua New Guinea)	Papua New Guinea	Flame	4th	-	5th
(Tonga)	Tonga	Black Marlins	-	6th	-
(United States)	United States	Freedom	3rd	3rd	4th
(United States)	United States	Liberty	-	7th	-

=== Grand final and third place playoff results ===
Year	Host	Grand Final match			Third Place Playoff match			Number of teams
Year	Host	Winner	Score	Runner-up	3rd place	Score	4th place	Number of teams
2011; Details	Melbourne, Sydney	Ireland	5.9 (39) - 1.2 (8)	Canada; Northern Lights	United States; Freedom	4.3 (27) - 1.2 (8)	Papua New Guinea	5
2014; Details	Melbourne	Canada; Northern Lights	5.8 (38) - 2.0 (12)	Ireland	United States; Freedom	6.8 (44) - 6.7 (43)	Canada; Midnight Suns	7
2017; Details	Melbourne	Ireland	4.1 (25) - 3.3 (21)	Canada; Northern Lights	(United Kingdom) Great Britain; Swans	5.2 (32) - 4.1 (25)	United States; Freedom	8
2020 (Cancelled)	Sunshine Coast	Cancelled	Cancelled	Cancelled	Cancelled	Cancelled	Cancelled	-
2023 (Cancelled)	Sunshine Coast	Cancelled	Cancelled	Cancelled	Cancelled	Cancelled	Cancelled	-

=== Overall tournament results ===
Sorted by winning percentage, with draws counted as half a win, half a loss, and percentage (points for/points against x 100).

Pos	Nation	P	W	L	D	PF	PA	%	PTS	%W
1	(Republic of Ireland) Ireland	15	14	1	0	800	163	490.79	56	93.33
2	Canada - Northern Lights	15	12	3	0	838	177	473.44	48	80
3	United States - Freedom	15	9	6	0	659	285	231.22	36	60
4	(United Kingdom) Great Britain	5	3	2	0	225	106	212.26	12	60
5	Papua New Guinea	10	4	6	0	343	290	118.27	16	40
6	Fiji	10	4	6	0	302	306	98.69	16	40
7	Canada - Midnight Suns	5	2	3	0	87	281	30.96	8	40
8	(Europe) European Crusaders (see European Crusaders)	5	1	4	0	65	336	19.34	4	20
9	Tonga	5	0	5	0	32	312	10.25	0	0
10	United States - Liberty	4	0	4	0	22	277	7.94	0	0
11	Australia	4	0	4	0	20	288	6.94	0	0
12	Pakistan	5	0	5	0	6	736	0.81	0	0
^ Table includes finals and has been adjusted to reflect this.

==== Overall tournament placings ====
Pos	Nation	Champions	Runners-up	Third	Fourth
1st	(Republic of Ireland) Ireland	2 (2011, 2017)	1 (2014)		
2nd	Canada - Northern Lights	1 (2014)	2 (2011, 2017)		
3rd	United States - Freedom			2 (2011, 2014)	1 (2017)
4th	(United Kingdom) Great Britain			1 (2017)	
5th	Papua New Guinea				1 (2011)
5th	Canada - Midnight Suns				1 (2014)

== Men's Division 2 results ==
Since the 2011 Australian Football International Cup the Men's competition has been split into two Divisions, with the format differing from each past edition. In 2011 and 2014, the divisional lineup was decided by a preliminary competition that involved all eighteen teams. In 2017, the divisions were pre determined prior to the tournament, with ten teams playing in Division 1 and eight playing in Division 2.

In 2014, Division Two was decided by ladder position.

=== Grand final and third place playoff results ===
Year	Host	Grand Final match			Third Place Playoff match			Number of teams
Year	Host	Winner	Score	Runner-up	3rd place	Score	4th place	Number of teams
2011; Details	Melbourne, Sydney	Fiji	9.8 (62) - 3.3 (21)	France	(Israel) (Palestine); Peres Team for Peace	7.15 (57) - 2.8 (20)	India	6 (of 18)
2014; Details	Melbourne	Sweden	N/A	Japan	China	N/A	Finland	6 (of 18)
2017; Details	Melbourne	Croatia	11.8 (74) - 1.2 (8)	Germany	China	4.8 (32) - 3.5 (23)	Japan	8 (of 18)

==== Overall tournament placings ====
Pos	Nation	Gold	Silver	Bronze	Fourth
1st	Fiji	1 (2011)			
1st	Sweden	1 (2014)			
1st	Croatia	1 (2017)			
4th	Japan		1 (2014)		1 (2017)
5th	France		1 (2011)		
5th	Germany		1 (2017)		
7th	China			2 (2014, 2017)	
8th	(Israel) (Palestine) Peres Team for Peace			1 (2011)	
9th	India				1 (2011)
9th	Finland				1 (2014)

== Qualification & Player Eligibility ==
As of the cancelled 2020 tournament there is no formal system in place for qualification of participating sides and countries are extended open invitations to send sides. The AFL had, for the first time, announced capping the men's competition to sixteen teams and the women's to eight; however no system for qualification has been proposed. While there are now established regional tournaments in Europe, Asia and North America performance in these tournaments does formally affect seedings for the International Cup.

The tournament is geared towards development of the sport outside Australia and as such player eligibility rules are much more strict than those of other international football competitions. Generally speaking players must be a citizen of the country they represent and have lived there through roughly middle school and high school ages (so that is usually where they learned to play). IC criteria ensures that expatriate Australians, Australians with overseas ancestry and those who moved to Australia at a young age are ineligible to compete (with the exception of the women's OzIM team, which is composed of indigenous and multicultural Australians). These rules, combined with professional contracts and limited pathways for players typically precludes professional players from participating and players wishing to participate must negotiate their own release from their AFL/AFLW contracts before nominating. In addition there is a per team cap on players registered with Australian clubs which countries teams from stacking their teams with talent developed in Australia. This limit was initially set to twelve, however with the increasing number of international players participating in Australian competitions and an increasing number of players learning the game outside Australia, this was later reduced to eight.

=== Current AFL/AFLW listed Players ===
The following AFL and AFLW listed international players have previously represented their country at the IC.

Currently on a club list

Player	AFL/AFLW club	International Team	Tournaments participated in
Clara Fitzpatrick	Gold Coast Suns	Ireland	2017
Hewago Oea	Gold Coast Suns	Papua New Guinea	2017

=== AFL/AFLW listed players who have participated while contracted ===
No senior AFL players on contracts have yet been released to play in the International Cup, like most amateur representative competitions, this is primarily due to the risk of injury. However clubs will sometimes make exclusions to allow the participation of lower paid rookies, international scholarship players and AFL Women's players in the amateur tournament.

Currently on a club list

Player	AFL/AFLW club	International Team	Tournament/s played in while contracted
Barclay Miller	St Kilda FC	New Zealand	2017
Joe Baker-Thomas	St Kilda FC	New Zealand	2017
Kendra Heil	Collingwood FC	Canada (women's)	2017
Laura Duryea	Melbourne FC	Ireland (women's)	2017
Gideon Simon	Richmond FC	Papua New Guinea	2014
Yoshi Harris	GWS Giants	Nauru	2011
Theo Gavuri	GWS Giants	Papua New Guinea	2011
Charlton Brown	GWS Giants	New Zealand	2011

== Individual honours ==
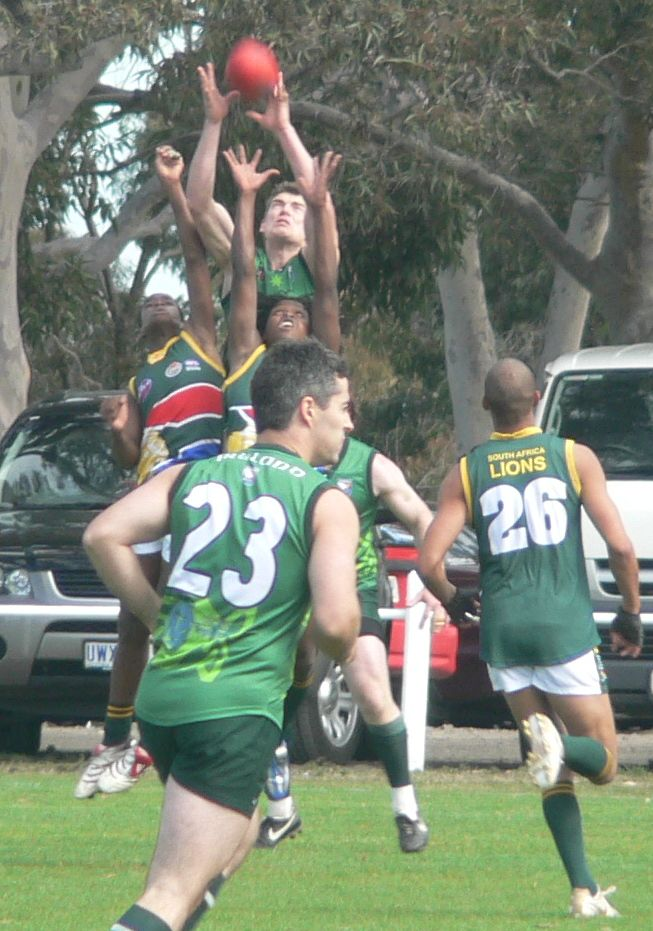
Mike Finn of Ireland, one of the tournament's most decorated players

=== Best and fairest ===
Tournament best and fairests have been named since 2005. In addition, each nation typically nominates their best and fairest player.

Year	Men's Best & Fairest
2002	
2005	(Samoa) Fia Tootoo, (Papua New Guinea) Navu Maha
2008	(Republic of Ireland) Mike Finn
2011	
2014	(Republic of Ireland) Mike Finn
2017	

=== World team honours ===
A World (formerly All-International) Team is selected from the best players (similarly to the All-Australian Team selection in the AFL). Prior to 2008, field positions and captaincy positions were not nominated. Captaincies have not been nominated since 2014.

==== Men's World Team ====
The following players have been nominated more than twice:

Player	Nation	World Team Caps	Years	Captaincies
Mike Finn	(Republic of Ireland) Ireland	4	2005, 2008, 2011, 2014	2 (2011, 2014)
John Ikupu	Papua New Guinea	3	2011, 2014, 2017	
Michito Sakaki	Japan	3	2005, 2008, 2017	
Fia Tootoo	Samoa	3	2002, 2005, 2008	
Tshoboko Moagi	South Africa	3	2011, 2014, 2017	

== Broadcasting and audience ==
The IC has maintained a low media profile for more than two decades.

=== Attendance ===
Apart from the Grand Final which is played as a curtain raiser, matches not scheduled for stadiums are free entry and are generally played midday and mid-week prohibiting it as a spectator event, though some regional matches have been played on weekends. As such, only two regional matches have attracted a significant attendance: 5,000 attended Japan vs South Africa in 2005 at City Oval in Wangaratta and 3,500 attended Papua New Guinea vs South Africa at Reid Oval in Warrnambool

=== Broadcast media ===
The 2002 tournament was video recorded and posted on the IAFC website though there were no live broadcasts. The United States Australian Football League also provided video coverage and recorded a documentary on its participation. The 2005 tournament attracted some coverage from Fox Sports including a Grand Final replay on Fox Sports (Australia) and the Fox Footy Channel, though matches were not broadcast. Some community radio and television stations in Victoria also provided limited coverage and World Footy News provided score updates. The AFL began posting videos of the 2008 tournament on its website along with editorial posts after the matches were played. The AFL failed to secure a broadcast partner for the 2011 tournament, instead adding delayed highlights to their online video service. For the 2014 tournament the AFL included live streaming for the first time and the tournament attracted media interest from outside Australia. For the 2017 tournament the AFL partnered with Internet service YouTube to provide live streaming of the three rounds held at Royal Park and the two Grand Finals. The USAFL, AFL Canada, World Footy News, and the Eastern Football League provided supplementary coverage of the school and community rounds.

IC coverage was not included in the AFL's record breaking 2.5 billion broadcasting deal in 2015 or contract negotiations in 2019 for the 2020 extension, though Kayo will stream AFLW matches. There were efforts to help raise the event's profile by broadcasting the 2017 International Cup on SBS, an organisation devoted to multicultural, multi-lingual entertainment, but this did not materialize

== Hosts ==
The inaugural IAFC tournament was held in the game's spiritual home of Melbourne, with some games at suburban stadiums around the city.

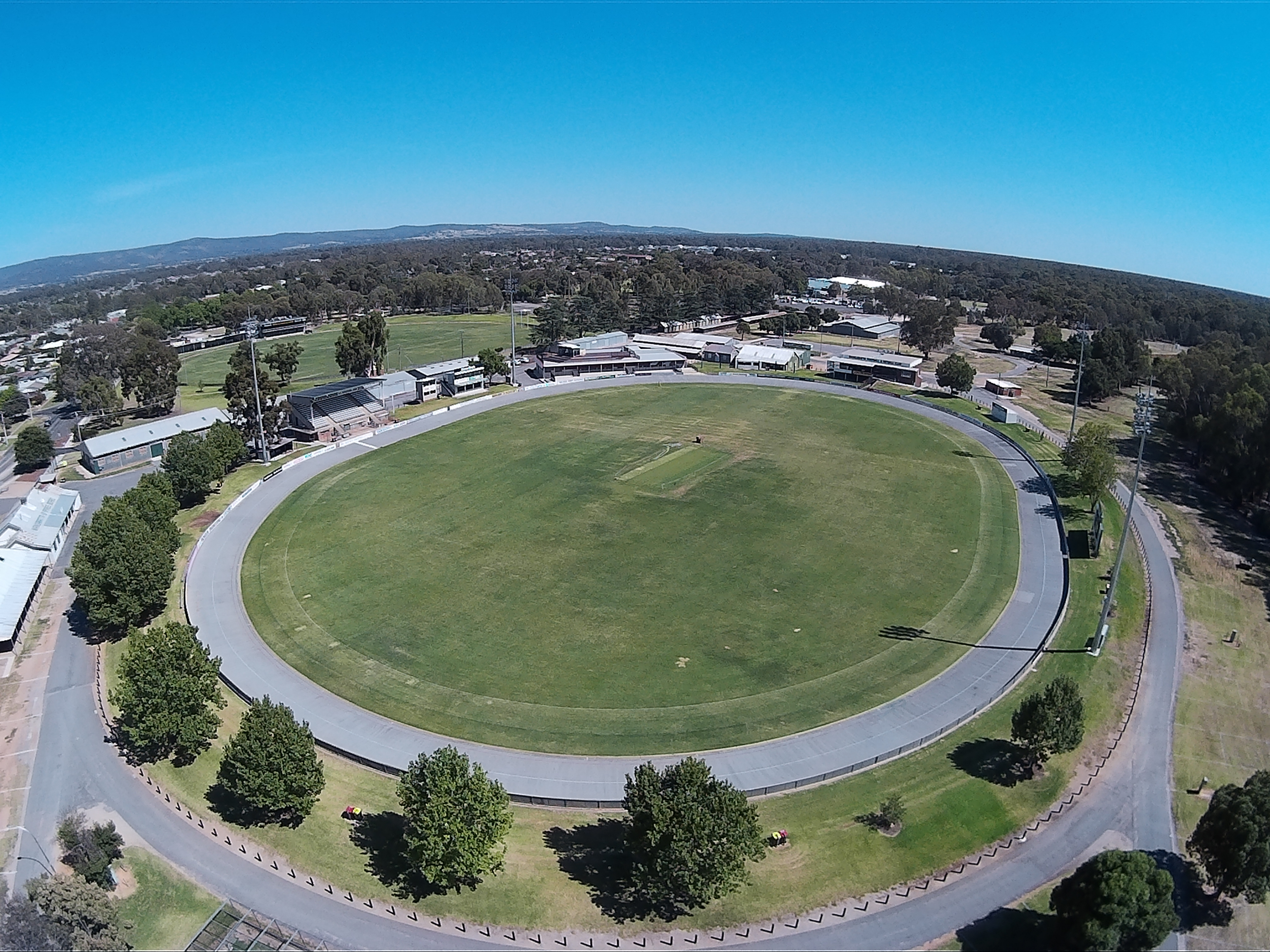
Showgrounds at Wangaratta, the event's first co-host city which has held the record match attendance since 2005

With the AFL headquartered in Melbourne, all events have been hosted in Victoria, Australia with regional matches in Warrnambool (2008), Wangaratta (2005), the exception being matches scheduled for Sydney, New South Wales in 2011. The West Australian Football League expressed an interest in bidding for the 2008 cup to go to Perth, Western Australia however the AFL did not open up hosting to bidders and the tournament was held in Victoria instead.

The cancelled 2020 tournament was the first time in the history of the event that the AFL opened up to bidders as part of a closed bidding process. Among newly introduced criteria was that the grounds must meet the AFL's Preferred Facility Guidelines at Regional level to qualify. These include requirements for the ground dimensions and surface, staff facilities, lighting and accessibility. The guidelines are mainly aimed at providing AFL staff with maximum amenity, there are no requirements for spectator seating, viewing mounds and a covered area under which spectators can stand are deemed sufficient for calculating ground capacity. The guidelines, combined with the requirement to have at least two main fields meeting this requirement in close proximity, has significantly raised the barrier to entry for hosting the tournament.

The result was selection between two bids, a Ballarat, Victoria bid to hold matches at the Eureka Stadium precinct and adjoining ovals North Oval No.2 (which underwent a total $38.5 million in upgrades to meet AFL standard criteria from 2016-2020) and a Sunshine Coast, Queensland bid backed by the Queensland government in partnership with Tourism and Events Queensland and Sunshine Coast Council to hold matches at the Maroochydore Multi Sports Complex (which underwent a total $5.8 million in upgrades to meet the AFL standard criteria in 2019-2020).

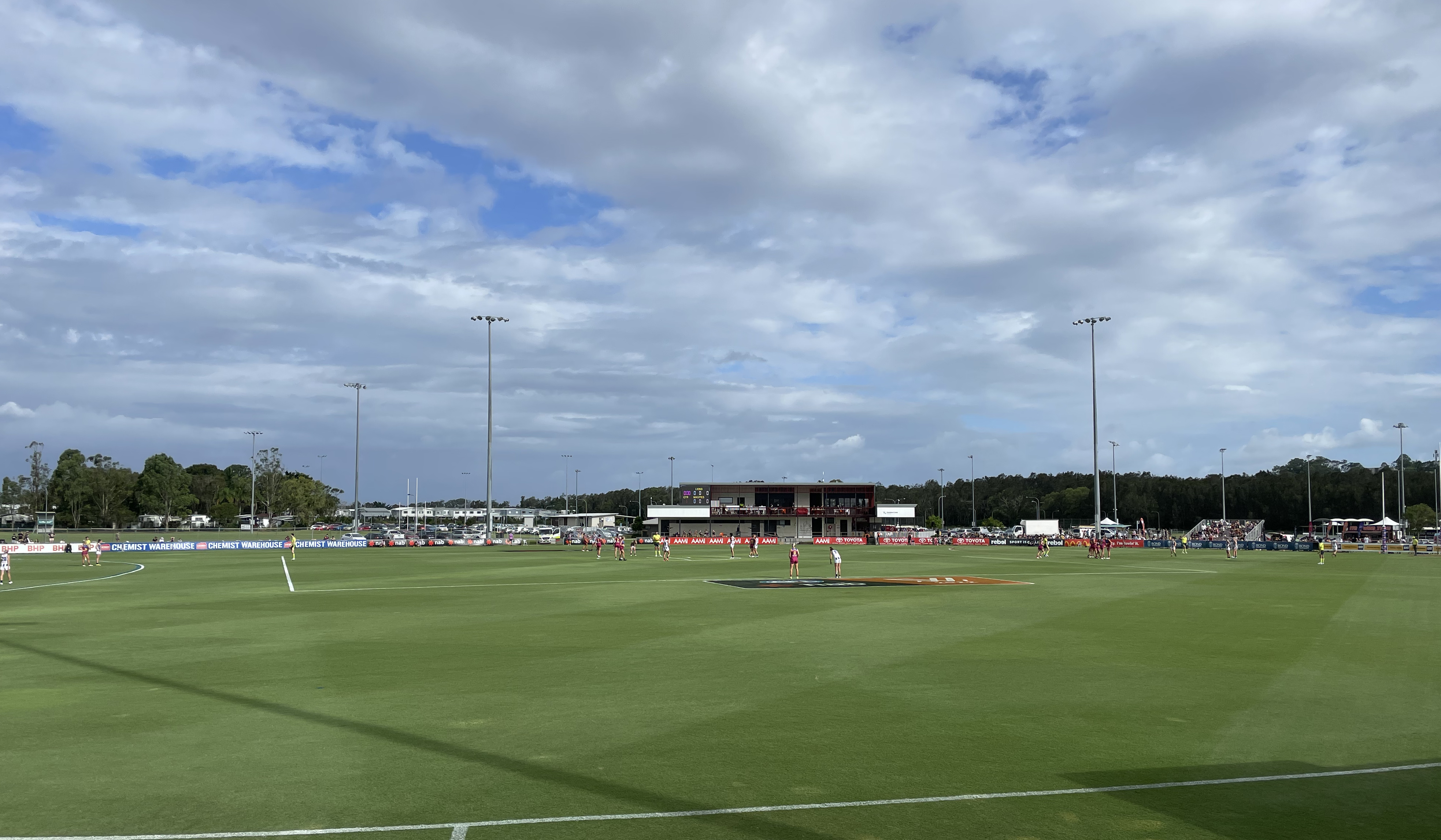
Maroochydore Multi Sports Complex, at Maroochydore proposed AFL standard host venue for the winning bid for the (cancelled) 2020 tournament

At the end of 2019, the AFL announced that it had selected the Sunshine Coast bid which would have seen the event hosted outside of Melbourne and Victoria for the first time (not counting the 2011 event which saw some secondary matches played in Western Sydney). As part of the Queensland bid, the Grand Finals would be played at the Brisbane Cricket Ground as a curtain raiser to a Brisbane Lions AFL premiership match. Queensland remained the successful bidder when the tournament was postponed until 2021. However following the cancellation of the 2020 tournament, no announcement was made as to whether the Queensland bid would be retained. On 22 April 2022, the AFL announced it would be continuing discussions with the winning Sunshine Coast bid.

== Popular culture ==
The AFL (video game series) by Melbourne game developer Wicked Witch Software has featured selectable teams, including player names, from the IC. In particular, AFL Evolution and AFL Evolution 2 let players play the entire IC17 tournament, but at AFL-standard stadiums from around Australia.

== Pathway to Professional AFL and Semi-Professional leagues in Australia ==
The IC has been a development pathway for several players who have been rookie listed or received an international scholarship with professional AFL clubs or clubs from semi-professional competitions throughout Australia. The first player to this pathway was Laura Corrigan who made an AFLW debut in 2016 following a 2011 senior appearance for Ireland. In 2022, the first male player, Hewago Oea made his debut in the AFL following a 2017 senior appearance for Papua New Guinea.

IC's potential as a pathway was first promoted by Kevin Sheedy while coaching at the Essendon Football Club, following the 2005 cup he invited Japanese IC players Michito Sakaki and Tsuyoshi Kase to train and play with the club's pre-season team. Though Essendon did not recruit Sakaki, he received an invitation to AFL Draft Camp and the exposure was a catalyst for the Wodonga Raiders club contracting him to play semi-professionally in the strong Ovens & Murray league in 2006.

For older international players, the IC is one of the only options other than moving to Australia and moving up the semi-professional competition pathway, to be noticed by recruiters and rookie listed to the AFL or AFLW. Unlike the AFL International Combine open-aged pathway, the IC is accessible to amateurs from a much broader international area and tests their gameplay and game sense, rather than just their athletic attributes.

For underaged international players the IC provides an alternative pathway and the opportunity to prove their ability to compete at a high senior level. Currently only New Zealand competes against the AFL Academy (Australia's best junior players) (though South Africa has in the past). The Under 16 and AFL U18/U19 Championships, AFL Women's Under 18 Championships and AFL draft held in Australia and the Pacific Nations Youth tournament do not provide the opportunity to test players ability against fully developed players, and provide limited opportunities for youth not willing to relocate to Oceania.

Since the first IC has been a major pathway for Papua New Guineans to play professionally (even with affiliations to Queensland in the National Championships). IC players from PNG finding their way to AFL clubs have included Amua Pirika, Hewago Oea (both debuted for the senior Papua New Guinea team when under 17 years old) and Stanis Susuve at the Gold Coast, Theo Gavuri at the GWS Giants and John James Lavai, Brendan Beno and David Meli at the Brisbane Lions.

IC players from other countries to have been recruited to play professionally include Padraig Lucey (Ireland) at Geelong Football Club, Joe Baker-Thomas (New Zealand) at St Kilda Football Club, Yoshi Harris (Nauru) at GWS Giants, and Kendra Heil (Canada) at Collingwood. All of these players were rookie listed shortly following outstanding performances in an IC tournament.

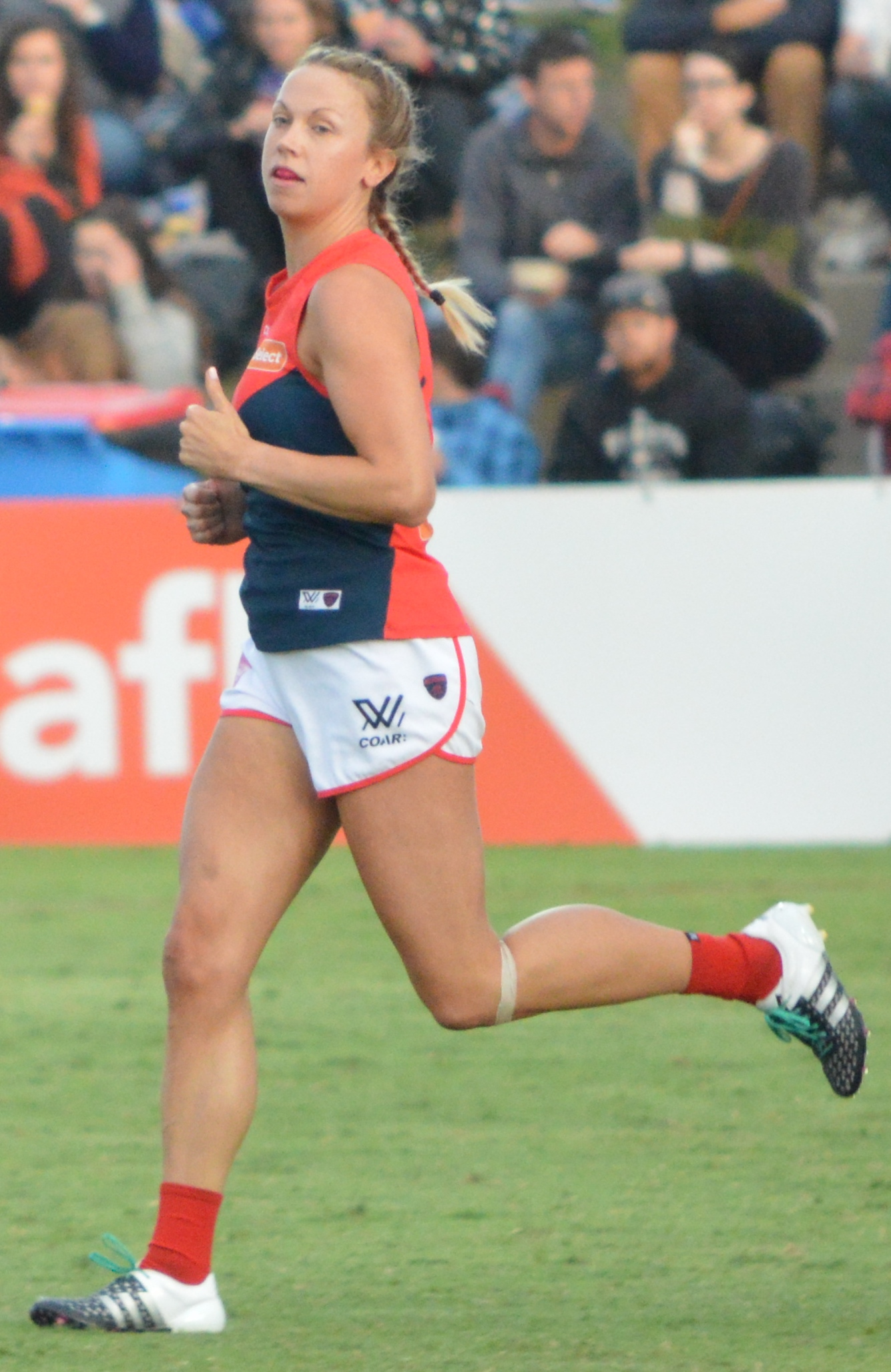
Laura Corrigan Duryea (Ireland: 2011, 2014) was selected by AFLW club Melbourne as a free agent in the 2016 AFL Women's draft

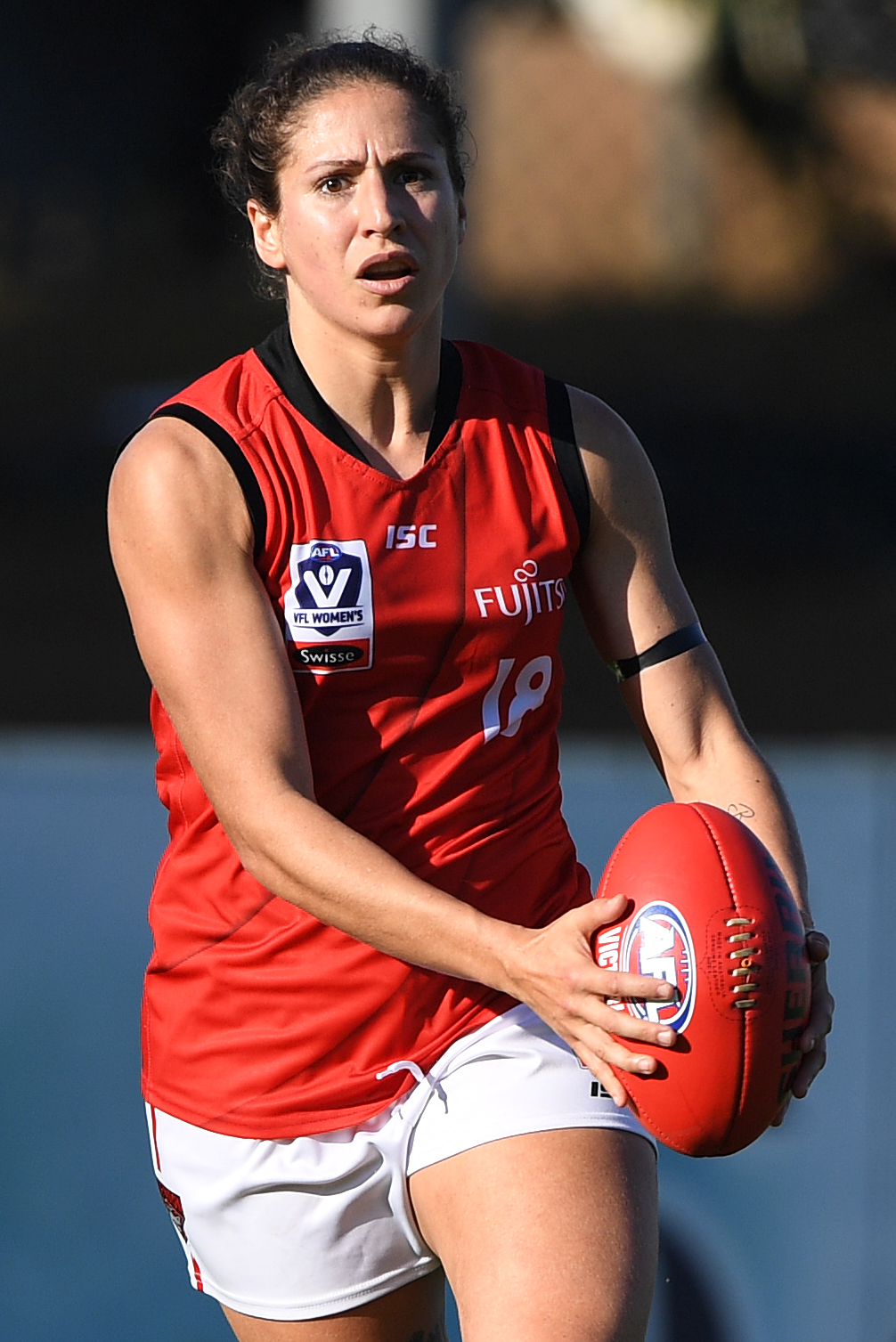
Kendra Heil (Canada: 2014) was selected by AFLW club Collingwood as a free agent in the 2016 AFL Women's draft

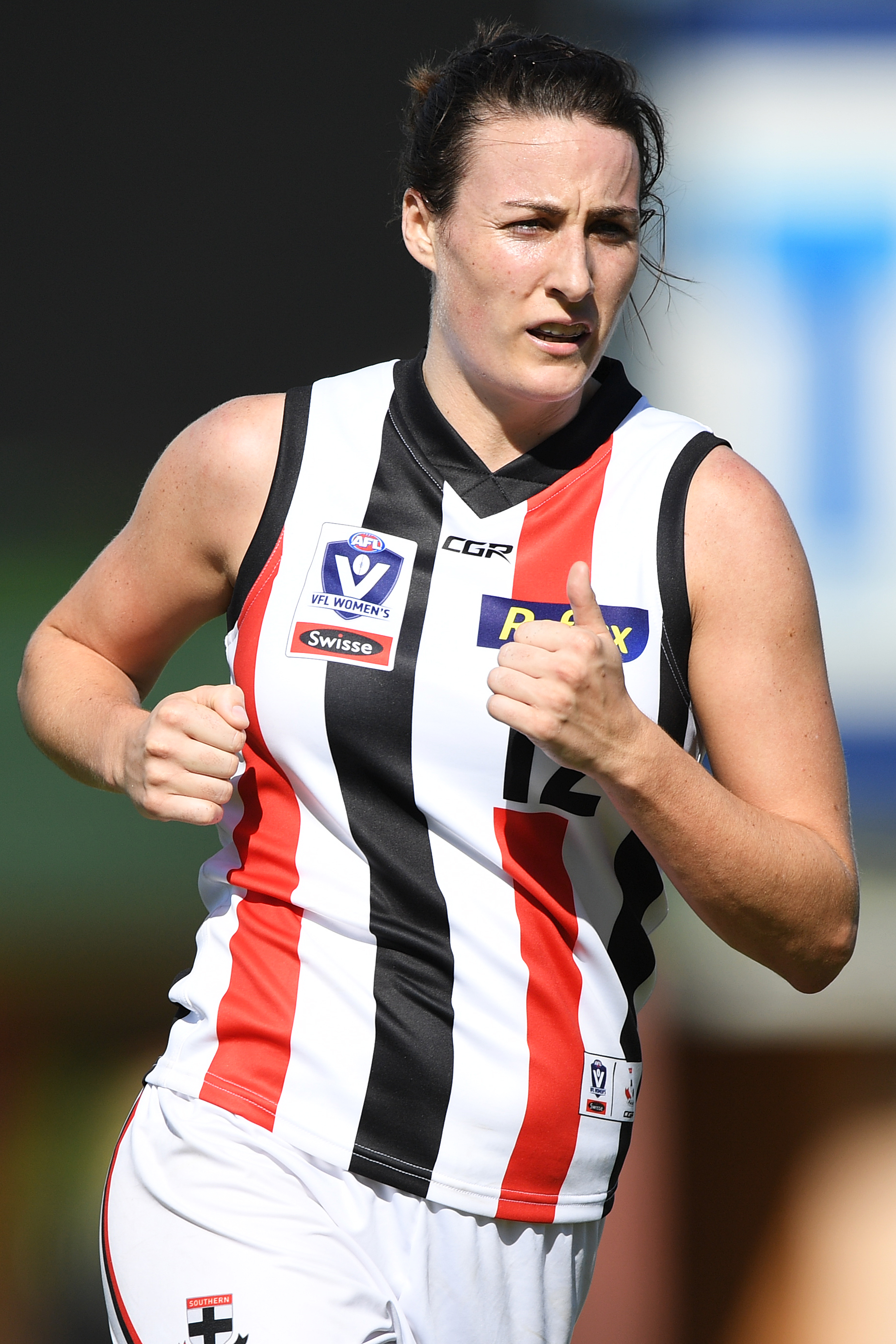
Clara Fitzpatrick (Ireland: 2017) was selected by AFLW club St Kilda as a rookie in the 2019 AFL Women's draft

== See also ==
- Australian Football Harmony Cup
- AFL Transatlantic Cup
- Australian rules football around the world
- Countries playing Australian rules football
- List of International Australian rules football tournaments
- World rankings
- IFAF World Championship
- IFAF Women's World Championship
