= Australian rules football in Finland =

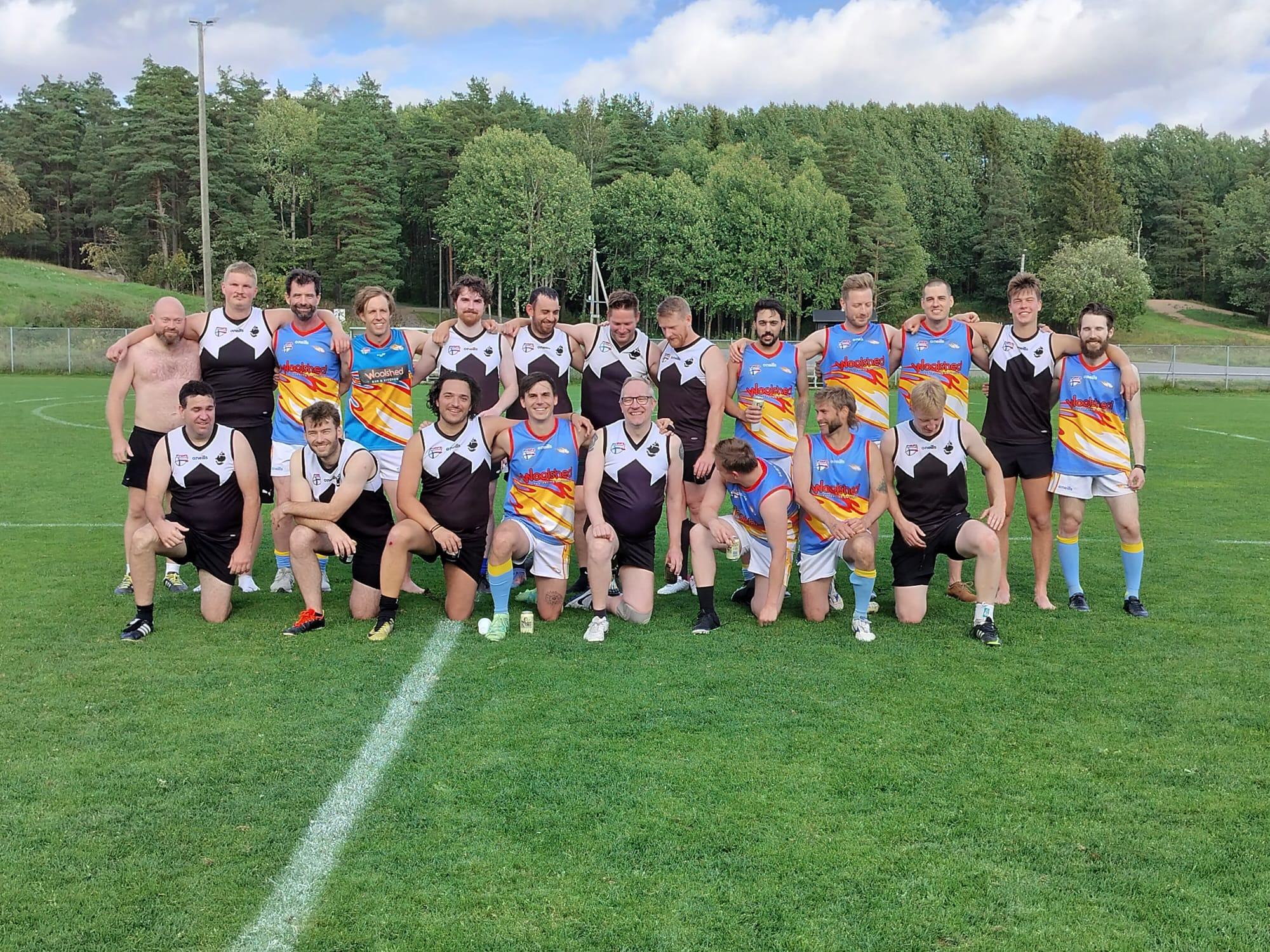
Helsinki Heatseekers and Turku Dockers teams on the August 24th 2024 match held in Turku

Australian rules football in Finland is controlled by the Finland AFL, which formed in 2006 after the creation of Finland's first Australian football club around a year earlier. Domestic matches began in 2007 with two teams, the Helsinki Heatseekers and Salo Juggernauts. A third team, the Espoo Roos was created in 2008 but only lasted one season due to insufficient members. The remaining players joined the Helsinki team, but there are plans to revive Espoo in the future. A third standalone club, the Turku Dockers, was formed in late 2008 by Australian Ex-pats Craig Primmer and Grant Siermans. During the 2010 season, Helsinki players Mika Kupila and Kaj Karlsson who study in Vaasa decided to create a team in the city, the Vaasa Wombats, and they are hoping to join the league in 2011.

The FAFL plays the European style Australian football which is played on soccer or American football fields and consists of 15 players on each team, with nine on the field and six on the interchange. The FAFL plays 15-minute quarters and also has a 40-metre scoring zone where all scores must be made from.

The first full domestic season was played with three stand-alone teams in 2009. The Turku Dockers defeated Helsinki for the inaugural Finnish premiership.

2010 saw the Turku Dockers go back to back, but this time defeating the Salo Juggernauts. The Dockers completed the 'perfect season' by not losing a game for the entire year, with an average winning margin of 73 points.

After the 2010 home and away season the first ever FAFL cup was held in Tali, Helsinki. Four teams competed on the day in a round robin style tournament that consisted of 12-minute halves. The Vaasa Wombats made their Australian Football debut against the Helsinki Heatseekers, losing by just 11 points. The Wombats scored their first win against the Salo Juggernauts in their second game of the day. The Turku Dockers won the tournament after defeating Helsinki in the final by 10 points. The Dockers were undefeated for the day, with close wins over Salo (6 points) and Helsinki (3 points) but more comfortably over Vaasa (27 points).

== Post Pandemic ==
A shortened season was played in 2020 due to the COVID-19 pandemic. The Helsinki Heatseekers created a splinter team called the Uusimaa Roos for the 2020 season.

At the end of the 2021 season the Waasa Wombats closed its doors permanently.

From 2022 onwards only the Helsinki Heatseekers and the Turku Dockers contested the premiership. The format adopted for the season, which is still the current format, is a best of five matches between the two teams.

== List of premiership winners ==
Year	Winner	Runner up
2009	Turku Dockers	Helsinki Heatseekers
2010	Turku Dockers	Salo Juggernauts
2011	Waasa Wombats	Turku Dockers
2012	Helsinki Heatseekers	Turku Dockers
2013	Turku Dockers	Helsinki Heatseekers
2014	Turku Dockers	Helsinki Heatseekers
2015	Helsinki Heatseekers	Turku Dockers
2016	Helsinki Heatseekers	Turku Dockers
2017	Helsinki Heatseekers	Turku Dockers
2018	Helsinki Heatseekers	Waasa Wombats
2019	Turku Dockers	Helsinki Heatseekers
2020	Helsinki Heatseekers	Turku Dockers
2021	Helsinki Heatseekers	Turku Dockers
2022	Turku Dockers	Helsinki Heatseekers
2023	Turku Dockers	Helsinki Heatseekers
2024	Turku Dockers	Helsinki Heatseekers
2025	Turku Dockers	Helsinki Heatseekers

2009: Turku Dockers 11.13:79 dft Helsinki Heatseekers 8.7:55

2010: Turku Dockers 19.17:131 dft Salo Juggernauts 8.5:53

2011: Vaasa Wombats 13.16:94 dft Turku Dockers 5.5:35

2012: Helsinki Heatseekers 18.8:116 dft Turku Dockers 8.1:49

2013: Turku Dockers 14.12:96 dft Helsinki Heatseekers 7.11:53

2014: Turku Dockers 14.17:101 dft Helsinki Heatseekers 7.11:53

2015: Helsinki Heatseekers dft Turku Dockers

== FAFL Tournament winners ==
2010: Turku Dockers 7.9:51 dft Helsinki Heatseekers 6.5:41

2013: Helsinki Heatseekers 10.8:68 dft Vaasa Wombats 2.2:14

2015: Helsinki Heatseekers 5.2:34 dft Turku Dockers 3.3:31

== League Best and Fairest ==
2009: Mika Kupila (Helsinki Heatseekers) and Juuso Timosaari (Turku Dockers)

2010: Ville Koivunen (Salo Juggernauts)

2024: Kane Bennington (Helsinki Heatseekers)

2025: Wyatt Turner (Turku Dockers)

== Leagues leading goal kicker ==
2009: Juuso Timosaari, 29 goals (Turku Dockers)

2010: Juha Leino, 20 goals (Turku Dockers)

2011: Martin Coloe, 18 goals (Helsinki Heatseekers)

2012: Juuso Timosaari, 22 goals (Turku Dockers)

2013: Terry Ludeman, 22 goals (Helsinki Heatseekers)

2024: Grant Siermans, 9 goals (Turku Dockers)

== League Records ==
Highest score: 26.18: 174, Vaasa Wombats vs Salo Juggernauts (2013)

Most goals in a game: 10, Carl Steinfort (Helsinki Heatseekers, 2009) and Juha Leino (Turku Dockers, 2010)

Career goals: Juuso Timosaari, 101 goals (Turku Dockers)

== International matches ==
Finland
- Nickname(s): Icebreakers
- Governing body: AFL Europe

Rankings
- Current: 24th (as of October 2022)

International Cup
- Appearances: 2 (first in 2008)
- Best result: 14th (2008)

The Finland Icebreakers are the representative Australian rules football team of Finland, formerly known as the Finnish Lions. They have twice won the Central European AFL Championships, going back-to-back in 2006 and 2007. While the team was started by Australian expatriates, it has been captained by a Finn ever since the 2nd match. Captains have included Kimmo Heikkilä, Jani Saarinen, Fredrik Romar and Ville Koivunen. The Icebreakers are now almost exclusively Finns.

The old Finnish jumper was primarily blue, with a white rectangle in the centre with the blue cross of the Finnish flag through it, and the coat of arms immediately below it. The current national jumper still has the flag as the predominant feature, but instead of the coat of arms, includes a stylized iceberg graphic.

The Lions' first home game on 13 May 2006 was claimed as the northernmost international game of Australian rules ever played, being hosted in Helsinki, the northernmost capital of Europe, although this was later overtaken by the club in Falun, Sweden.

=== 2007 ===
Finland participated in the 2007 EU cup in Hamburg, Germany finishing six after a disappointing 2-point loss to Spain which would have seen them advance and be certain of a top four finish. Two Finnish players were voted into the All-European team, Grant Siermans who played with the Finland Icebreakers and Jari Pystynen who played with the EU Crusaders. Siermans was also the leading goal kicker for Finland booting 13 goals, which was the second most by any player during the day. In the strongest man competition, Izzy Barker won, completing the greatest number of push ups.

AFL Brownlow medallist Jimmy Bartel visited Finland in October 2007, playing for the Salo Juggernauts following his AFL premiership season. In the game, he took a spectacular mark over an opposition ruckman and a difficult goal from the pocket. He was presented with the no.8 guernsey for the Finland national team.

=== 2008 ===
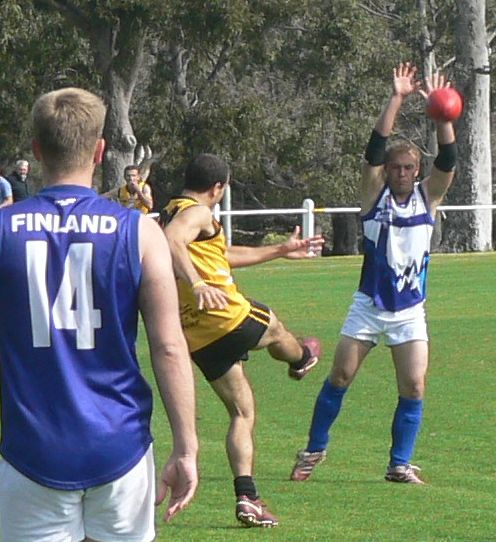
Finland defending against Israel-Palestine at the IC08

Finland made its Australian Football International Cup debut at the 2008 tournament. The Finns finished 14th out of the 16 competing nations, losing their first four matches, but then defeating fellow debutants India in their final game of the tournament.

Finland then sent a team to the 2008 EU Cup in Prague, even after having just sent a national team to the AFL International Cup in Australia. The team consisted of six Australians, one New Zealander, three Irish and only five Finns due to the financial burden the IC tournament put on many national players. Even so, the Finland Icebreakers under new coaches James Meek and Simon McGregor and captain Jani Saarinen performed well throughout the day and finished a place higher than the previous year defeating France in the final game of the day to finish fifth. Once again, Grant Siermans was voted into the All-European team after finishing second in the tournament vote count, and also took out the tournaments leading goal kicker with fifteen goals for the day. Mika Kupila performed well in the fast man competition finishing second.

=== 2009 ===
In 2009 Finland sent a team to the EU Cup in Croatia made up entirely of players who had learned the game in Finland. The squad consisted of 13 Finns, an Irishman and a Colombian. The team was coached by Grant Siermans and captained by Fredi Romar. The Icebreakers had two wins for the day, marginally beating Andorra and having a comfortable win over the Czech Republic. Finland performed well against eventual winners England, and were leading by 9 points at half time, the only team to be leading England at half time for the entire day. However, they lost to England and then were convincingly beaten by the Irish Exiles, leaving them in 8th position.

Leading goal kicker for Finland was Juuso Timosaari who kicked 4 goals for the day and also registered some sort of scoring shot in all of the four games Finland played.

Mika Kupila was rewarded for his consistent performances all day by being selected into the All-European team. Janne Hokkanen performed well in the strongest man competition finishing 3rd, whilst Siermans won the longest kick.

=== International Cup ===
- 2002: Did not compete
- 2005: Did not compete
- 2008: 14th
- 2011: Did not compete
- 2014: 14th

=== European Championships ===
- 2010: 7th
