= Women's Australian Football Association =

United States Australian Football League
- Sport: Australian rules football
- Founded: 2003
- Founder: Leigh Swansborough
- First season: 2005
- No. of teams: 21
- Country: USA
- Most recent champions: San Francisco Iron Maidens (2nd premiership)
- Most titles: Denver Bulldogs (6 premierships)
- Related competitions: United States Australian Football League

The Women's Australian Football League (also known as USAFLW) is a women's Australian rules football competition in the United States of America. The league is the organising body for women's Australian rules football in the United States. It operates under the United States Australian Football League USAFL, the sport's governing body in the country.

== History ==
Leigh Swansborough of California began the Women's Australian Football League, organising teams to play in the inaugural women's match in the US. The Orange County Bombshells and an all-comers team played in Kansas City in October 2003. The Bombshells ran out winners by 44 points.

== US Nationals ==
The USAFL National Championships incorporated a Women's Division for the first time in 2005. The Atlanta Lady Kookaburras won the championship in 2005, 2006 and 2007. The Canada-based Calgary Kookaburras won the 2008 championship.

== National team ==
The national team, formed to compete against Canada, is known as USA Freedom.

== Clubs ==
Women's teams as of March 2018 include:

- Arizona Lady Hawks (Phoenix/Tempe area)
- Atlanta Lady Kookaburras Official Site
- Denver Lady Bulldogs Official Site
- Minnesota Freeze Official Site
- North Star Blue Ox Official Site
- New York Lady Magpies Official Site
- Orange County Bombshells Official Site
- San Francisco Iron Maidens Official Site
- Seattle Grizzlies
- Washington First Lady Eagles

The game grew rapidly and by 2021 there was a women's club for every men's club, plus two additional teams, the North Star Blue Ox and the Centennial Tigers (a total of 52).

== See also ==
- List of Australian rules football women's leagues
