= Footy 9s =

Variation of Australian rules football

- Sport: Altered version of Australian rules football
- Country: Australia
- Headquarters: Melbourne, Victoria, Australia
- Venue: Box Hill Rugby Club

Footy 9s is a version of Australian rules football created by Australian Football International.

== Background ==
The traditional 18-a-side version of Australian rules football provides significant participatory barriers to entry outside of Australia, including a lack of access to suitably sized fields, significant infrastructure in the form of the goal and behind posts, line marking, and the fact that 36 players required to field two teams for a match.

Footy 9s was created by Australian Football International to allow Australian rules football to be played on smaller playing fields, both in Australia and internationally.

== Rules ==
The rules of Footy 9s differ from traditional Australian rules football in some significant ways. The game is played on a rectangular field, allowing matches to be hosted by stadiums that usually lack the suitable field dimensions:

- The game is played on a rectangular field, which can be either a soccer, rugby or American football field.
- Each team consists of nine players – three forwards, three midfielders and three backs.
- The game starts with a jump ball in the middle of the field, and this is repeated after each goal.
- A goal is scored when the ball is kicked into the net (using soccer fields) or through the posts (using rugby and American football fields): there are no behind posts.
- The ball is moved around the field by either a kick or handball: no kicking off the ground is permitted.
- Players can go anywhere on the field, and there is no off-side rule.
- As per basketball, players must bounce the ball when they run.

== World 9s ==
The inaugural AFI World 9s tournament was held at Lakeside Stadium in Melbourne, Australia on 16 February 2019.

The second World 9s was held at Box Hill Rugby Club in Melbourne, Australia on 6 February 2021, and the third World 9s was also held at Box Hill Rugby Club on 19 February 2022.

The fourth World 9s was held again at the Box Hill Rugby Club, on 4 February 2023.
