= 2014 Australian Football International Cup =

AFL International Cup 2014

Tournament details
- Host country: Australia
- Dates: 9–23 August 2014
- Teams: 25 (18 Men's, 7 Women's)

Final positions
- Champions: Papua New Guinea (2nd title)
- Runners-up: Ireland
- Third place: New Zealand

Tournament statistics
- Matches played: 62 (45 Men's, 17 Women's)

The 2014 Australian Football International Cup (also known as the AFL International Cup 2014 or IC14) was the fifth edition of the Australian Football International Cup, an international Australian rules football competition run by the Australian Football League.

It was contested between Saturday August 9 to Saturday August 23, with games played in Melbourne. All three previous champions (Ireland, New Zealand and Papua New Guinea) participated in the tournament.

== Men's tournament ==
There are 18 nations competing in the 2014 Tournament. Of these, 15 competed in the previous tournament; Indonesia and Pakistan make their debuts, while Finland return having previously competed in 2008. The teams were seeded into three pools of six to decide which teams would play each other, though all teams will be ranked on a single ladder.

Pool A	Pool B	Pool C
Ireland (1); Nauru (6); (United Kingdom) Great Britain (7); Fiji (12); France (13); Indonesia (18)	Papua New Guinea (2); South Africa (5); Tonga (8); Japan (11); India (14); Pakistan (17)	New Zealand (3); United States (4); Canada (9); Sweden (10); China (15); Finland (16)

=== First round (Days 1-3) ===
	Day 1
Sunday, 10 August 11:30am	Ireland 8.7 (55)	def.	Fiji 1.4 (10)	McAlister Oval, Royal Park, Melbourne
Sunday, 10 August 1:30pm	Nauru 35.17 (227)	def.	Indonesia 1.1 (7)	McAlister Oval, Royal Park, Melbourne
Sunday, 10 August 3:30pm	(United Kingdom) Great Britain 12.18 (90)	def.	France 1.1 (7)	McAlister Oval, Royal Park, Melbourne
Sunday, 10 August 9:30am	Tonga 24.22 (166)	def.	India 1.0 (6)	Ransford Oval, Royal Park, Melbourne
Sunday, 10 August 1:30pm	South Africa 23.22 (160)	def.	Pakistan 2.2 (14)	Ransford Oval, Royal Park, Melbourne
Sunday, 10 August 3:30pm	Papua New Guinea 24.19 (163)	def.	Japan 1.0 (6)	Ransford Oval, Royal Park, Melbourne
Sunday, 10 August 9:30am	United States 27.20 (182)	def.	Finland 0.1 (1)	Western Oval, Royal Park, Melbourne
Sunday, 10 August 11:30am	New Zealand 24.18 (162)	def.	Sweden 0.0 (0)	Western Oval, Royal Park, Melbourne
Sunday, 10 August 3:30pm	Canada 19.5 (119)	def.	China 0.1 (1)	Western Oval, Royal Park, Melbourne

	Day 2
Wednesday, 13 August 11:30am	Nauru 6.14 (50)	def.	(United Kingdom) Great Britain 4.5 (29)	Ransford Oval, Royal Park, Melbourne
Wednesday, 13 August 1:30pm	Ireland 17.9 (111)	def.	France 0.2 (2)	Ransford Oval, Royal Park, Melbourne
Wednesday, 13 August 3:30pm	Fiji 32.16 (208)	def.	Indonesia 0.0 (0)	Ransford Oval, Royal Park, Melbourne
Wednesday, 13 August 9:30am	Japan 9.4 (58)	def.	Pakistan 3.4 (22)	Western Oval, Royal Park, Melbourne
Wednesday, 13 August 1:30pm	South Africa 13.4 (82)	def.	Tonga 2.5 (17)	Western Oval, Royal Park, Melbourne
Wednesday, 13 August 3:30pm	Papua New Guinea 33.18 (216)	def.	India 0.0 (0)	Western Oval, Royal Park, Melbourne
Wednesday, 13 August 12:30pm	New Zealand 28.25 (193)	def.	China 0.0 (0)	Linen House Centre, Seaford
Wednesday, 13 August 1:30pm	Sweden 13.13 (91)	def.	Finland 2.2 (14)	McAlister Oval, Royal Park, Melbourne
Wednesday, 13 August 3:30pm	United States 8.3 (51)	def.	Canada 2.8 (20)	McAlister Oval, Royal Park, Melbourne

	Day 3
Saturday, 16 August 11:40am	(United Kingdom) Great Britain 4.9 (33)	def. by	Fiji 7.7 (49)	Koonung Reserve, Bulleen
Saturday, 16 August 12:00pm	France 16.14 (110)	def.	Indonesia 0.4 (4)	Diggers Rest Reserve, Diggers Rest
Saturday, 16 August 5:15pm	Ireland 10.6 (66)	def.	Nauru 6.3 (39)	Queen Elizabeth Oval
Saturday, 16 August 11:40pm	Tonga 21.10 (136)	def.	Japan 2.3 (15)	Elgar Park, Box Hill North
Saturday, 16 August 12:00pm	Papua New Guinea 7.8 (50)	def. by	South Africa 8.11 (59)	St Mary's Oval, Geelong
Saturday, 16 August 4:00pm	India 1.1 (7)	def. by	Pakistan 14.17 (101)	Highgate Recreation Reserve
Saturday, 16 August 11:10am	China 3.8 (26)	def.	Finland 3.4 (22)	Eureka Stadium, Ballarat
Saturday, 16 August 11:45am	Canada 20.10 (130)	def.	Sweden 0.0 (0)	Ben Kavanagh Reserve
Saturday, 16 August 12:30pm	New Zealand 10.11 (71)	def.	United States 2.1 (13)	Montrose Recreation Reserve
* These matches are to be played as curtain-raisers to various metropolitan and country football matches around Victoria.

=== Ladder Till Day 3 ===
The top four teams at the end of Day 3 progress to the International Cup Semi-finals. The other teams will play another match, depending on their ladder position, with those results added to the Ladder to decide Day 5 matchups.

The 5th to 12th-placed teams will play in Division 1 for the remainder of the tournament, and the 13th-placed team onwards will play in Division 2.

#	TEAM	P	W	L	D	PF	PA	%	PTS	Div
1	New Zealand	3	3	0	0	431	13	3315.38	12	Preliminary; Finals
2	Ireland	3	3	0	0	232	51	454.90	12	Preliminary; Finals
3	South Africa	3	3	0	0	301	81	371.60	12	Preliminary; Finals
4	Papua New Guinea	3	2	1	0	431	65	663.08	8	Preliminary; Finals
5	Canada	3	2	1	0	259	52	498.08	8	Division; One
6	Tonga	3	2	1	0	325	103	315.53	8	Division; One
7	Nauru	3	2	1	0	316	102	309.80	8	Division; One
8	Fiji	3	2	1	0	267	88	303.41	8	Division; One
9	United States	3	2	1	0	246	92	267.39	8	Division; One
10	(United Kingdom) Great Britain	3	1	2	0	152	106	143.40	4	Division; One
11	Pakistan	3	1	2	0	137	225	60.89	4	Division; One
12	France	3	1	2	0	119	205	58.05	4	Division; One
13	Sweden	3	1	2	0	91	311	29.26	4	Division; Two
14	Japan	3	1	2	0	79	323	24.48	4	Division; Two
15	China	3	1	2	0	27	334	8.08	4	Division; Two
16	Finland	3	0	3	0	37	299	12.37	0	Division; Two
17	India	3	0	3	0	13	483	2.69	0	Division; Two
18	Indonesia	3	0	3	0	11	549	2.00	0	Division; Two

=== Semi-finals (Day 4) ===
Note: Ladder positions in this section refer to standings after Day 3 of the tournament.

	Semi-finals
Tuesday, 19 August 11:30am	New Zealand 4.4 (28)	def. by	Papua New Guinea 12.3 (75)	Ransford Oval, Royal Park, Melbourne
Tuesday, 19 August 1:30pm	Ireland 8.5 (53)	def.	South Africa 4.4 (28)	Ransford Oval, Royal Park, Melbourne

=== Divisional Matches (Day 4) ===
	Division 1 Matches
Tuesday, 19 August 3:30pm	Canada 9.15 (69)	def.	France 2.3 (15)	Ransford Oval, Royal Park, Melbourne
Tuesday, 19 August 11:30am	Tonga 21.21 (147)	def.	Pakistan 1.0 (6)	McAlister Oval, Royal Park, Melbourne
Tuesday, 19 August 1:30pm	Nauru 7.7 (49)	def.	(United Kingdom) Great Britain 5.3 (33)	McAlister Oval, Royal Park, Melbourne
Tuesday, 19 August 3:30pm	Fiji 3.2 (20)	def. by	United States 12.7 (79)	McAlister Oval, Royal Park, Melbourne

	Division 2 Matches
Tuesday, 19 August 11:30am	Sweden 9.6 (60)	def.	Indonesia 4.8 (32)	Western Oval, Royal Park, Melbourne
Tuesday, 19 August 1:30pm	Japan 5.4 (34)	def.	China 2.5 (17)	Western Oval, Royal Park, Melbourne
Tuesday, 19 August 3:30pm	Finland 3.7 (25)	def.	India 1.2 (8)	Western Oval, Royal Park, Melbourne

=== Final Division Ladders ===
Division 1

#	TEAM	P	W	L	D	PF	PA	%	PTS	Fin
1	Canada	4	3	1	0	328	67	489.55	12	Division; One Final
2	Tonga	4	3	1	0	472	109	433.03	12	Division; One Final
3	United States	4	3	1	0	325	112	290.18	12	7th Place; Playoff
4	Nauru	4	3	1	0	365	135	270.37	12	7th Place; Playoff
5	Fiji	4	2	2	0	287	167	171.86	8	9th Place; Playoff
6	(United Kingdom) Great Britain	4	1	3	0	185	155	119.35	4	9th Place; Playoff
7	France	4	1	3	0	134	274	48.91	4	11th Place; Playoff
8	Pakistan	4	1	3	0	143	372	38.44	4	11th Place; Playoff

Division 2

#	TEAM	P	W	L	D	PF	PA	%	PTS
1	Sweden	4	2	2	0	151	343	44.02	8
2	Japan	4	2	2	0	113	368	30.71	8
3	Finland	4	1	3	0	62	307	20.20	4
4	China	4	1	3	0	44	334	13.17	4
5	Indonesia	4	0	4	0	43	609	7.06	0
6	India	4	0	4	0	21	508	4.13	0

=== Positional Finals (Days 5 & 6) ===
Note: Ladder positions in this section refer to standings after Day 4 of the tournament (above).

	3rd/4th Place Playoff
Friday, 22 August 1:00pm	New Zealand 6.8 (44)	def.	South Africa 6.7 (43)	Ransford Oval, Royal Park, Melbourne

	5th/6th Place Playoff (Division 1 Championship)
Friday, 22 August 1:00pm	Canada 9.7 (61)	def.	Tonga 7.6 (48)	McAlister Oval, Royal Park, Melbourne

	7th/8th Place Playoff
Friday, 22 August 11:00am	United States 4.11 (35)	def. by	Nauru 8.6 (54)	McAlister Oval, Royal Park, Melbourne

	9th/10th Place Playoff
Friday, 22 August 11:00am	Fiji 2.7 (19)	def. by	(United Kingdom) Great Britain 5.7 (37)	Western Oval, Royal Park, Melbourne

	11th/12th Place Playoff
Friday, 22 August 1:00pm	France 13.11 (89)	def.	Pakistan 1.2 (8)	Western Oval, Royal Park, Melbourne

	Final Division 2 Matches
Friday, 22 August 9:00am	Finland 1.0 (6)	def. by	Japan 12.19 (91)	Ransford Oval, Royal Park, Melbourne
Friday, 22 August 9:00am	Sweden 10.14 (74)	def.	China 4.6 (24)	Western Oval, Royal Park, Melbourne
Friday, 22 August 3:00pm	Indonesia 9.6 (60)	def.	India 1.1 (7)	Western Oval, Royal Park, Melbourne

=== Grand Final (Day 6) ===
Grand Final
Saturday, 23 August 4:50 pm	Papua New Guinea	def.	Ireland	Melbourne Cricket Ground
1.2 (8); 3.4 (22); 3.8 (26); 6.9 (45)	Q1; Q2; Q3; Final	3.2 (20); 3.4 (22); 4.5 (29); 6.6 (42)
Beno 2 Ikupu, Gideon, So-ong, Agita 1	Goals	4 Finn; 1 Henry, Lucey
Ikupu, Beno, Simon, Guvuri, Peni	Best	Finn, Farrell, P. O’Halloran, O’Regan, Bartley

=== Final standings ===
#	TEAM	Div
1	Papua New Guinea	Preliminary; Finals
2	(Republic of Ireland) Ireland	Preliminary; Finals
3	New Zealand	Preliminary; Finals
4	South Africa	Preliminary; Finals
5	Canada	Division; One
6	Tonga	Division; One
7	Nauru	Division; One
8	United States	Division; One
9	(United Kingdom) Great Britain	Division; One
10	Fiji	Division; One
11	France	Division; One
12	Pakistan	Division; One
13	Sweden	Division; Two
14	Japan	Division; Two
15	Finland	Division; Two
16	China	Division; Two
17	Indonesia	Division; Two
18	India	Division; Two

AFL International Cup 2014 champions

Papua New Guinea
Second title

== Women's tournament ==
For the second consecutive time, there was a concurrent Women's tournament alongside the Men's competition. Seven teams participated from five countries - the United States and Canada both fielded two teams.

- Canada Midnight Suns
- Canada Northern Lights
- Ireland
- Fiji
- Tonga
- USA Freedom
- USA Liberty

=== Round-Robin Matches ===
Each team played four matches across five matchdays. Matches played on Saturday 16 August - the "Community Round" of the tournament - were played as curtain-raisers to other amateur Metropolitan and Country football matches to be confirmed; all other games in the round-robin were held at Royal Park, Melbourne.

	Round-Robin Matches
Sunday, 10 August 9:30am	Ireland 10.7 (67)	def.	Fiji 1.0 (6)	McAlister Oval, Royal Park, Melbourne
Sunday, 10 August 11:30am	Tonga 1.1 (7)	def. by	Canada Midnight Suns 4.6 (30)	Ransford Oval, Royal Park, Melbourne
Sunday, 10 August 1:30pm	Canada Northern Lights 8.13 (61)	def.	USA Freedom 1.1 (7)	Western Oval, Royal Park, Melbourne
Wednesday, 13 August 9:30am	USA Freedom 9.10 (64)	def.	Canada Midnight Suns 1.2 (8)	Ransford Oval, Royal Park, Melbourne
Wednesday, 13 August 11:30am	Ireland 9.9 (63)	def.	Tonga 1.2 (8)	McAlister Oval, Royal Park, Melbourne
Wednesday, 13 August 11:30am	Canada Northern Lights 19.11 (125)	def.	USA Liberty 0.0 (0)	Western Oval, Royal Park, Melbourne
Saturday, 16 August 2:00pm	Ireland 10.10 (70)	def.	USA Liberty 1.0 (6)	Plenty Park, Plenty
Saturday, 16 August 2:30pm	Canada Northern Lights 9.13 (67)	def.	Fiji 0.2 (2)	Mulgrave Reserve, Wheelers Hill
Saturday, 16 August 4:30pm	USA Freedom 9.11 (65)	def.	Tonga 0.0 (0)	Kings Park Reserve, St Albans
Monday, 18 August 11:00am	Ireland 11.12 (78)	def.	Canada Midnight Suns 2.1 (13)	Ransford Oval, Royal Park, Melbourne
Monday, 18 August 11:00am	Fiji 7.5 (47)	def.	USA Liberty 0.1 (1)	McAlister Oval, Royal Park, Melbourne
Wednesday, 20 August 10:00am	Canada Northern Lights 22.12 (144)	def.	Tonga 2.0 (12)	Ransford Oval, Royal Park, Melbourne
Wednesday, 20 August 10:00am	USA Freedom 12.7 (79)	def.	Fiji 0.1 (1)	McAlister Oval, Royal Park, Melbourne
Wednesday, 20 August 12:00pm	Canada Midnight Suns 5.5 (35)	def.	USA Liberty 2.3 (15)	Ransford Oval, Royal Park, Melbourne

=== Ladder ===
TEAM	P	W	L	D	PF	PA	%	PTS
Canada Northern Lights	4	4	0	0	397	21	1890.48	16
Ireland	4	4	0	0	278	33	842.42	16
USA Freedom	4	3	1	0	215	70	307.14	8
Canada Midnight Suns	4	2	2	0	87	164	53.05	4
Fiji	4	1	2	0	56	214	26.17	4
Tonga	4	0	3	0	27	303	8.91	0
USA Liberty	4	0	3	0	22	277	7.94	0

=== Finals ===
After the round-robin tournament, the last placed team was eliminated. The other six teams played one extra match to decide the final placings, with the top two teams on the ladder playing in the Women's International Cup Grand Final.

	5th/6th Place Playoff
Friday, 22 August 9:00am	Fiji 1.3 (9)	def.	Tonga 0.5 (5)	Western Oval, Royal Park, Melbourne

	3rd/4th Place Playoff
Friday, 22 August 11:00am	USA Freedom 17.15 (117)	def.	Canada Midnight Suns 0.0 (0)	Ransford Oval, Royal Park, Melbourne

	2014 Australian Football International Cup Grand Final
Saturday, 23 August 2:10pm	Canada Northern Lights 5.8 (38)	def.	Ireland 2.0 (12)	Punt Road Oval

== World Teams ==
=== Men's World Team ===
AFL International Cup 2014 Men's World Team
B:	(New Zealand) Ben Miller	(Papua New Guinea) John Ikupu	(South Africa) Asanda Funda
HB:	(Republic of Ireland) Brendan Browne	(Tonga) Peni Mahina	(South Africa) Khayalethu Sikiti
C:	(Canada) Nathan Strom	(Papua New Guinea) Gideon Simon (vc)	(United States) Saleh Tyebjee
HF:	(United Kingdom) Luke Matias	(Republic of Ireland) Padraig Lucey	(Nauru) Jonas Amwano
F:	(Fiji) Jiuta Vatutei	(Papua New Guinea) Amua Pirika	(United Kingdom) Sam Willatt
Foll:	(Republic of Ireland) Mike Finn (c)	(South Africa) Tshoboko Moagi	(New Zealand) Andrew Howison
Int:	(Canada) Neil Casey	(Republic of Ireland) David Stynes	(New Zealand) Aaron Harris
Int:	(United States) Dan Lehane		

=== Women's World Team ===
AFL International Cup 2014 Women's World Team
B:	(United States) Alexa Blatnik	(Tonga) Malia Afuha’Amango	(United States) Catherine Georgiadis
HB:	(Republic of Ireland) Fiona Roarty	(Fiji) Salote Matakibau	(Canada) Hilary Perry
C:	(Canada) Emma Dickinson	(Canada) Amy Legault (c)	(Republic of Ireland) Paula Keatley
HF:	(Canada) Veronica Fernandez	(Canada) Kirsten Bodashefsky	(Canada) Kendra Heil
F:	(United States) Sara Edwards-Rohner	(Republic of Ireland) Aimee Hazely	(United States) Kim Hemenway
Foll:	(United States) Hallie Lee	(Republic of Ireland) Laura Corrigan	(Republic of Ireland) Emma Kelly
Int:	(Canada) Renee Tong	(Canada) Lara Hilmi	(Republic of Ireland) Gill Behan
Int:	(Canada) Danah Arnold		

== See also ==
- Australian Football League
- Australian Football International Cup
- Australian rules football around the world
