= Australian rules football in Fiji =

- Country: Fiji
- Governing body: AFL Fiji
- National team: Fiji
- First played: 1963, Suva

Audience records
- Season: Fijian Australian Football League

The sport of Australian rules football has been played in Fiji since at least 1963, when an exhibition was held in Suva.

Fiji has produced several professional players for the Australian Football League, however organised Australian rules did not begin there until 2009.

The governing body for the sport on the islands is AFL Fiji, created in 2009.

Fiji's national teams include the junior team which debuted in the 2005 Oceania Cup (which Fiji has the designated host country for most of the tournamen'ts history), men's team which debuted internationally at the 2011 Australian Football International Cup (where they were crowned Division 2 champions) and the women's at the 2014 Australian Football International Cup.

== History ==
An Australian rules exhibition was held at Suva in 1963. In 1965, St Kilda Football Club returned to Fiji as part of a proposed biennial end of season trip, but declined to further promote the game there.

The first television broadcasts of matches by the Australia Network began in 2002. In the period 2004–2008, a proposal for a serious ongoing Australian Rules football competition was mooted by former Fiji Police Commissioner, Andrew Hughes. Hughes had played footy at various amateur levels in Australia and was keen to promote it when he arrived in Fiji to take up his post as the nation's top cop. In mid-2004, Hughes, based in Suva, called a meeting within the Fiji police force of officers interested in assisting with his vision of using the force itself as the basis for developing and promoting a local footy competition. According to one who was present at that initial meeting in the Police Officers Mess, ‘Hughes himself was to be the trainer and teacher’ of the new code. A second meeting was held in Lautoka for interested officers based in the West. According to the Police Public Relations Officer at the time, Mesake Koroi, ‘many top rugby players joined in and it started off well, but there was no one except Hughes to run the [programme], so it was hard because, of course, he had other police work to attend to’. This then was the first effort to establish the sport in Fiji. The Fijian Australian Football Association was formed as a governing body but the sheer weight of workload for Hughes meant the FAFA went into recess without creating an organised league. (A failed bid was made for inclusion of the sport into the 2007 South Pacific Games held in Fiji.). Meanwhile, the Western Bulldogs became the first AFL club to actively scouting for recruits in Fiji. This project was later announced to begin with open trials in Suva and Labasa in October of that year 2004. 16 year-old Solomon Loki and 19 year-old Inoke Ratu were added to the Western Bulldogs International scholarship lists. They were not able to take up their offers regrettably because of visa obstructions arising out of Fiji's 2006 coup.

Additionally, in early 2005, representatives the Fiji Daily Post (FDP) newspaper (Alan Hckling publisher; Mesake Koroi then general manager; and editor Robert Wolfgramm), met with Police Commissioner Hughes to alert him of their interest in promoting the code and to work with other like-minded locals and expats by giving publicity to footy through the newspaper. As the 2005 pre-season began, Melbourne-based footy enthusiast, Lex Neander, began filing match summaries for the FDP. His column soon turned into a weekly full page run every Tuesday which continued until the end of the 2008 Australian footy season.

In 2008 meanwhile, pushing footy in Fiji then fell to Fiji-born, David Rodan jnr, the professional player who began with Richmond but was then with Port Adelaide football club. David had long expressed an interest in bringing the code to Fiji and was anointed the AFL's official ambassador for the code. In 2008 his plans were shared with fellow Port Adelaide recruit, Alipate Carlile, and physical education teacher and wife-to-be, Carla Di Pasquale. Together they explored the possibility of Port Adelaide football club joining with him to re-establish the code here in Fiji by means of a new body - ‘AFL Fiji’. In a historic presentation to the PA football club, the Rodan-led trio outlined a proposed logo, a playing strip, and a timeline for establishing the code in Fiji. The trio also outlined where the Hughes initiative failed, and proposed a strategy for future success. The AFL accepted the grand design of his vision and partnered Rodan's initiative with their representative, Andrew Cadzow, who was overseeing "AFL Asia-Pacific" in Brisbane.

In July 2009, Andrew arrived at Suva's Holiday Inn on behalf of the AFL with a brief to develop a plan and establish a steering committee to drive the Rodan-inspired vision into reality. The chief question because Rodan was still playing footy in Australia, was who on the ground would take the interest in footy to concretise it, give it substance, make it work. In response to a newspaper advertisement, fifteen Fiji locals turned up on the July 10th and 11th to hear what Andrew cadzow proposed. Apologies to the meeting were received from David Rodan snr, David Rodan jnr, Carla Di Pasquale, John and Marilyn (from Levuka homestay), and Mareta (from Iwala Events). But among those present were Peter Fulcher, Damian Ames and Pam, Nemani and Biri Rokobuli, Lia Ratu and son Inoke, Vasenai Loki and son Solo, Caroline Narruhn and son Joseph, and Lupe Wolfgramm and her sons, Max and Dylan (who had playing experience as juniors in Melbourne beforehand). From this formative group, Damian Ames was appointed inaugural Chairman. Pam, the Rokobuli and Loki families, as well as Caroline Narruhn were nominated to the Steering Committee.

During the meeting, Cadzow also outlined a future for an "AFL Fiji" that could potentially involve a calendar of events packed with school programmes, talent searches, Auskick/Fijikick rollouts, the presence of a youth ambassador, corporate sponsorships, and participation in Oceania and International Cup championships – all to be overseen by a structured AFL Fiji steering committee and advisory board. The immediate aim was to get up and running, organised and operational, by September 2009, with an official AFL Fiji launch in October as part of the inaugural David Rodan Cup Under 16s competition. That inter-school competition would serve as a filter for local players to join a new national team to compete in December 2009, in an inaugural Under 16s Oceania Cup championships hosted in Fiji.

After the AFL creation of the "AFL Oceania" in Australia in 2008, Fiji was identified as a major target for Australian rules football development in the region. AFL Fiji's formation in mid-2009, by the creation of national committee. In August (2009), Dylan Wolfgramm was selected to be Fiji's representative in an Oceania Under 23 team to play exhibition matches in Cairns on the occasion of the sitting of the Pacific Islands Forum there. Kevin Rudd and other leaders were present to witness the Mal Michael-coached Oceania team win a match against a North Queensland representative side. In September (2009) a newly formed AFL Fiji Steering Committee met at the Holiday Inn and comprised: Tony Moore, Jordan Moore, Lupe Wolfgramm, Max Wolfgramm, Dylan Wolfgramm, Inoke Ratu, Lia Ratu, Solo Loki, Vasenai Loki, Damian Ames, Alex Hales (from the Fiji Daily Post), Caroline Narruhn, Joseph Narruhn, David Rodan Snr, David Rodan Jnr, and Carla Di Pasquale. The meeting settled dates for a forthcoming official launch of AFL Fiji and to set dates for and inaugural "David Rodan Cup" and inter-Pacific "Oceania Cup". ‘Super-clinics’ were also planned at Marist, Grammar, Dudley, Cathedral, International, Laucala Bay and Gospel secondary schools, along with training of development officers necessary for completing the preparatory skilling tasks. Volunteers were assigned for finding sponsorships, game venues, and maintaining the media profile of AFL Fiji.

In the second week of October 2009, the AFL's Andrew Cadzow arrived and co-launched "AFL Fiji". Coinciding with this, Chris Maple and others from the Western Bulldogs Football Club had begun running footy clinics and searches at various locations around Fiji. "With their rugby background they’re used to physical contact, they’re athletic, and from what I’ve seen today they’re very hard working – all the traits needed for AFL football," Maple told Dale Carruthers, a Canadian journalist attached to the Fiji Daily Post newspaper. New AFL Fiji chairman, Damian Ames, also told the newspaper that Fiji was an ideal ground for introducing the code - "It’s an untapped source of athletes," Ames said. But the major challenges of introducing the code Damian admitted was that "rugby is so entrenched here [in Fiji]." Ames, Cadzow and other supporters attended and co-supervised clinics held at Suva Grammar School on 14 October, and later at Marist Brothers, while Bulldog representatives Maple and crew were at Yat Sen School doing their talent search.

Following these first tentative steps to gauge local interest, on Friday 16 October 2009, AFL Fiji was modestly, officially and publicly launched with about thirty in attendance in the Banyan Room at Suva's Holiday Inn. Australia's High Commissioner, James Batley, kindly accepted my invitation to do the honours with best wishes for the future. Three days later, 19 October, the Diwali Day public holiday, Fiji "first footy carnival" leading to the "David Rodan Cup" was held. At the end of round-robin matches, the inaugural cup was awarded to Laucala Bay Secondary College, with Runners Up Suva Grammar School; and 3rd Place to Cathedral Secondary School, with 4th Place: Gospel High School. From these four teams, a "Fiji Power" squad was picked to contest the forthcoming inaugural "Oceania Cup" to be held in December (2009). The squad was named as: Laijiasa Bolenaivalu, Fuata Silisoma, Ropate Tobe, Darryll Arthur-Valentine, Jonathan Chongkit, Jiuta Vateitei, Viliame Tuni, Esekia Gibbons, Joeli Logavatu, Gabriel Ledua, Eroni Niumataiwalu, Anasa Yabaki, Wilson Kacivi, Penisoni Tuiova, Richard Niulevu, Semisi Apakuki, Sisa Qarikau, Kinivuwai Nanovo, Paula Rokotuiloma, Samuela Delai, Semi Tikoitoga, Titus Raihman, Ledua Tuberi, Mesake Dakai, Yabaki Cakautini, John Tuivanuakula, Solo Ratu, Dylan Wolfgramm, and Luke Gucake.

The inaugural ‘Under 16 Oceania Cup’ was held at Cathedral Secondary School grounds, 11–13 December (2009). Nauru, New Zealand, Samoa, Tonga and Fiji teams competed. In blustery weather, the fiercely but fairly contested Cup went to Tonga. All Pacific teams would head to Tonga in 2010. In the meantime, footy clinics were conducted in schools around the Suva-Nausori area with training sessions organised weekly at Albert Park in downtown Suva.

In 2010, a schools tournament was held, with more than 80 students from 14 different schools in Suva and Nausori represented in six teams that played round robin matches. The "Fiji Power" national team made its first appearance at the Under 16 Oceania Cup in Tonga in December 2010.

A senior team entered the 2011 Australian Football International Cup and were highly successful, taking the Division 2 title after dominating the Grand Final against France.

A local league with four teams (Nausori Cats, Raiwaqa Bulldogs, Suva City Swans and Suva Lions) has since commenced.

In October 2022, the Australian government announced its commitment to a support package for the sport in Fiji.

== National team ==
=== Men's team ===
Fiji
- Nickname(s): Tribe
- Governing body: AFL Fiji

Rankings
- Current: 14th (as of October 2022)

International Cup
- Appearances: 3 (first in 2011)
- Best result: 8th (2017)

The Fiji men's national Australian rules football team has competed in the Australian Football International Cup three times, finishing 13th in 2011, 10th in 2014 and 8th in 2017.

==== Results ====
International Cup
Year	Place	Change
2011	13th	Steady
2014	10th	▲3
2017	8th	▲2

=== Women's team ===
Fiji
- Nickname(s): Vonu
- Governing body: AFL Fiji

Rankings
- Current: 5th (as of October 2022)

International Cup
- Appearances: 2 (first in 2014)
- Best result: 5th (2014)

The Fiji women's national Australian rules football team has competed in the Women's International Cup twice, finishing 5th in 2014 and 6th in 2017.

==== Results ====
International Cup
Year	Place	Change
2014	5th	Steady
2017	6th	▼1

== Notable players ==
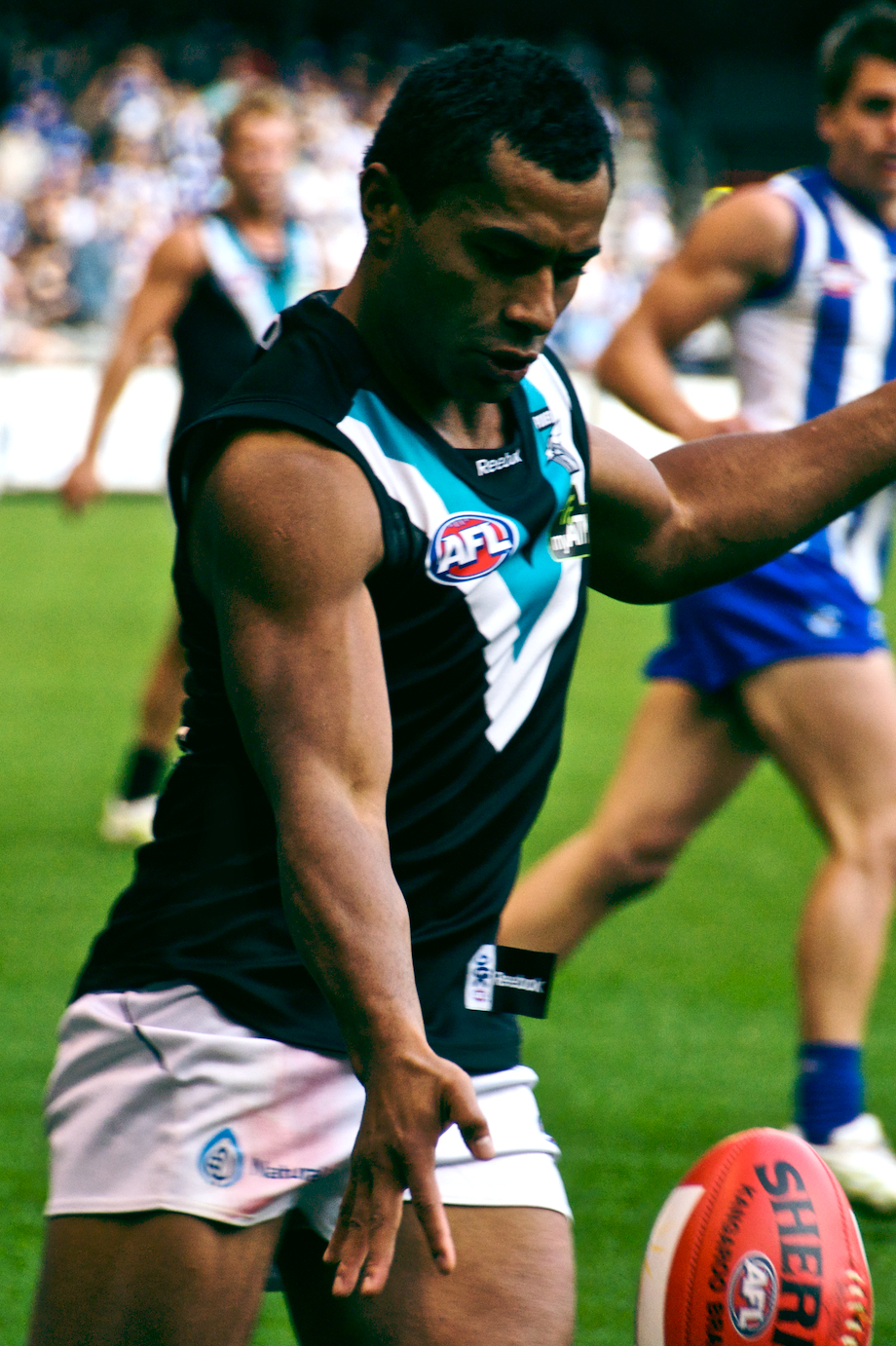
David Rodan Fijian born games record holder and AFL umpire playing for Port Adelaide in 2011

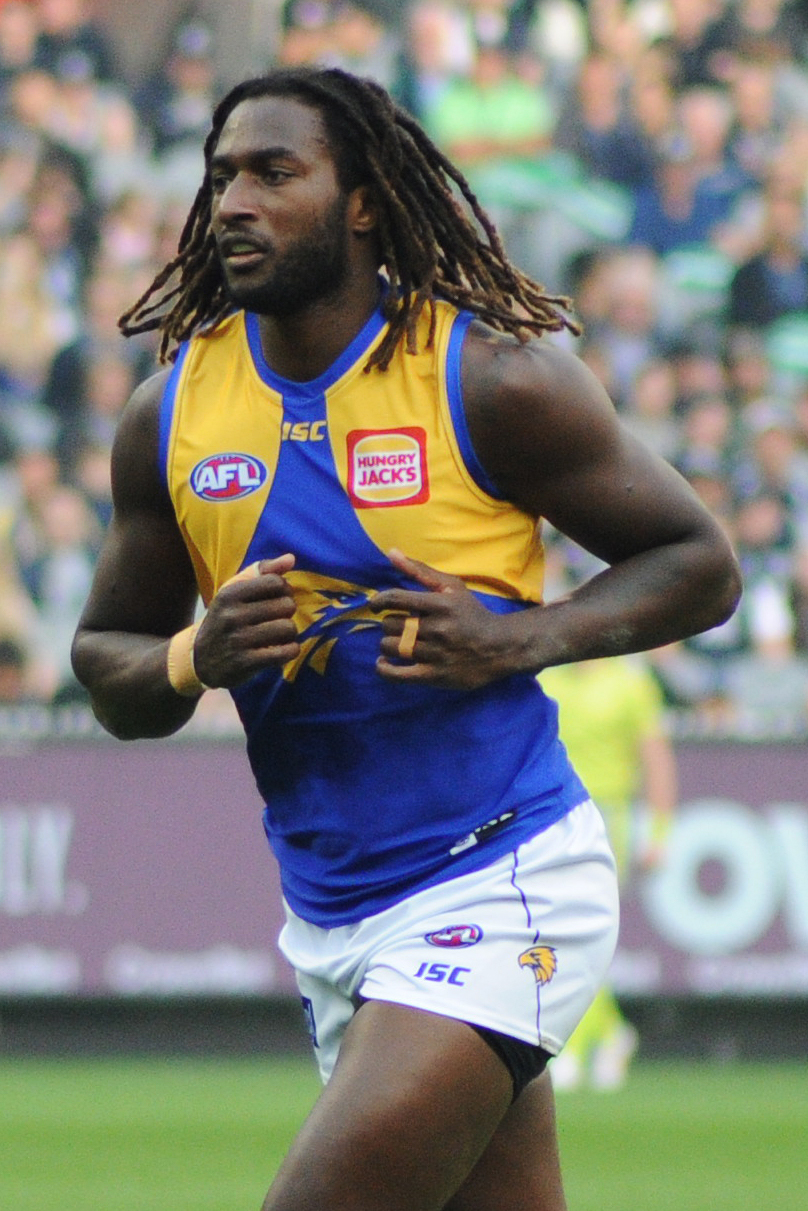
Nic Natainui playing for West Coast in 2018

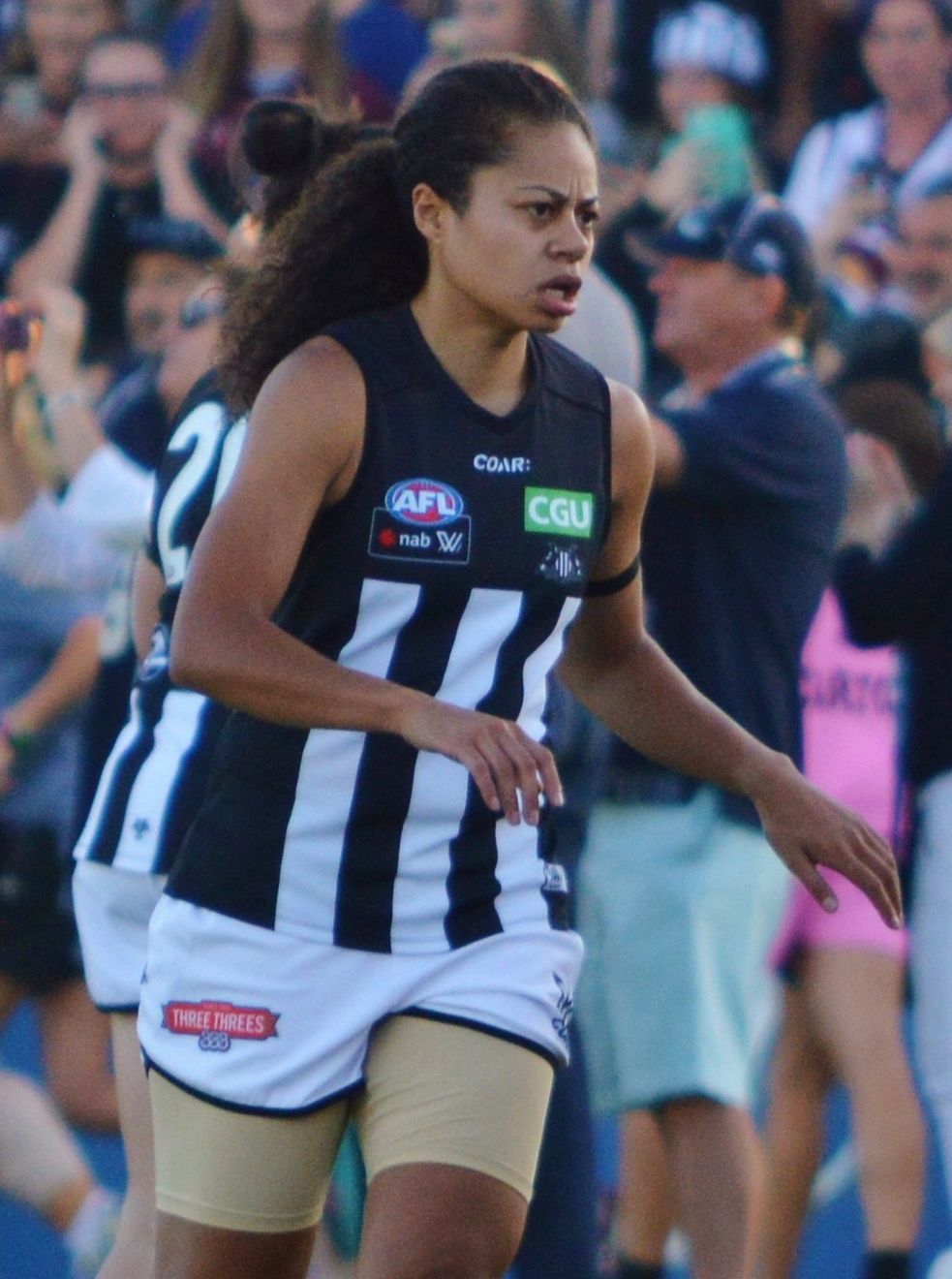
Helen Roden playing for Collingwood in 2017

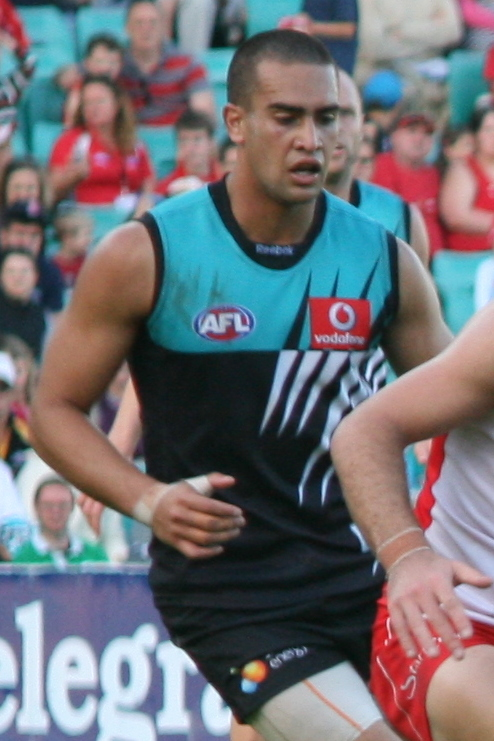
Alipate Carlile playing for Port Adelaide in 2009

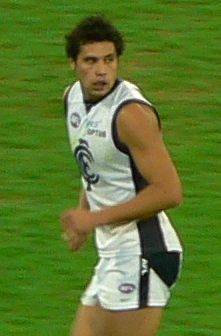
Setanta O'Hailpin playing for Carlton in 2008

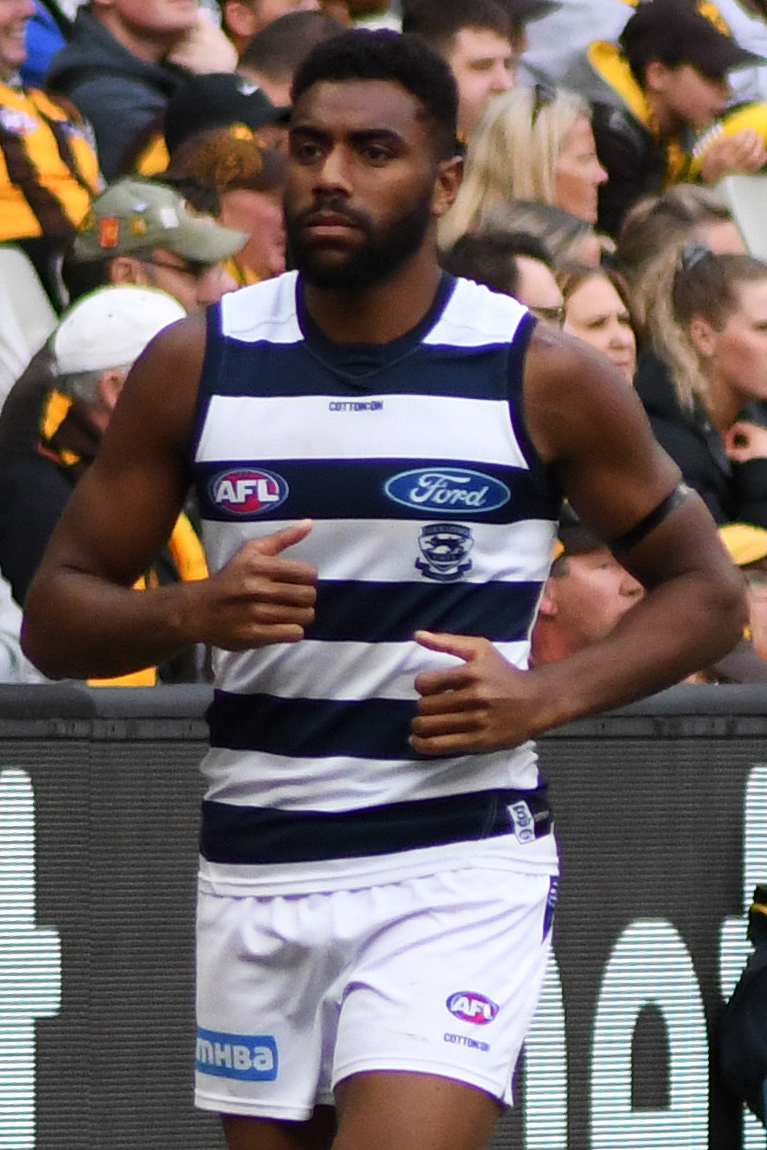
Esava Ratugolea playing for Geelong in 2019

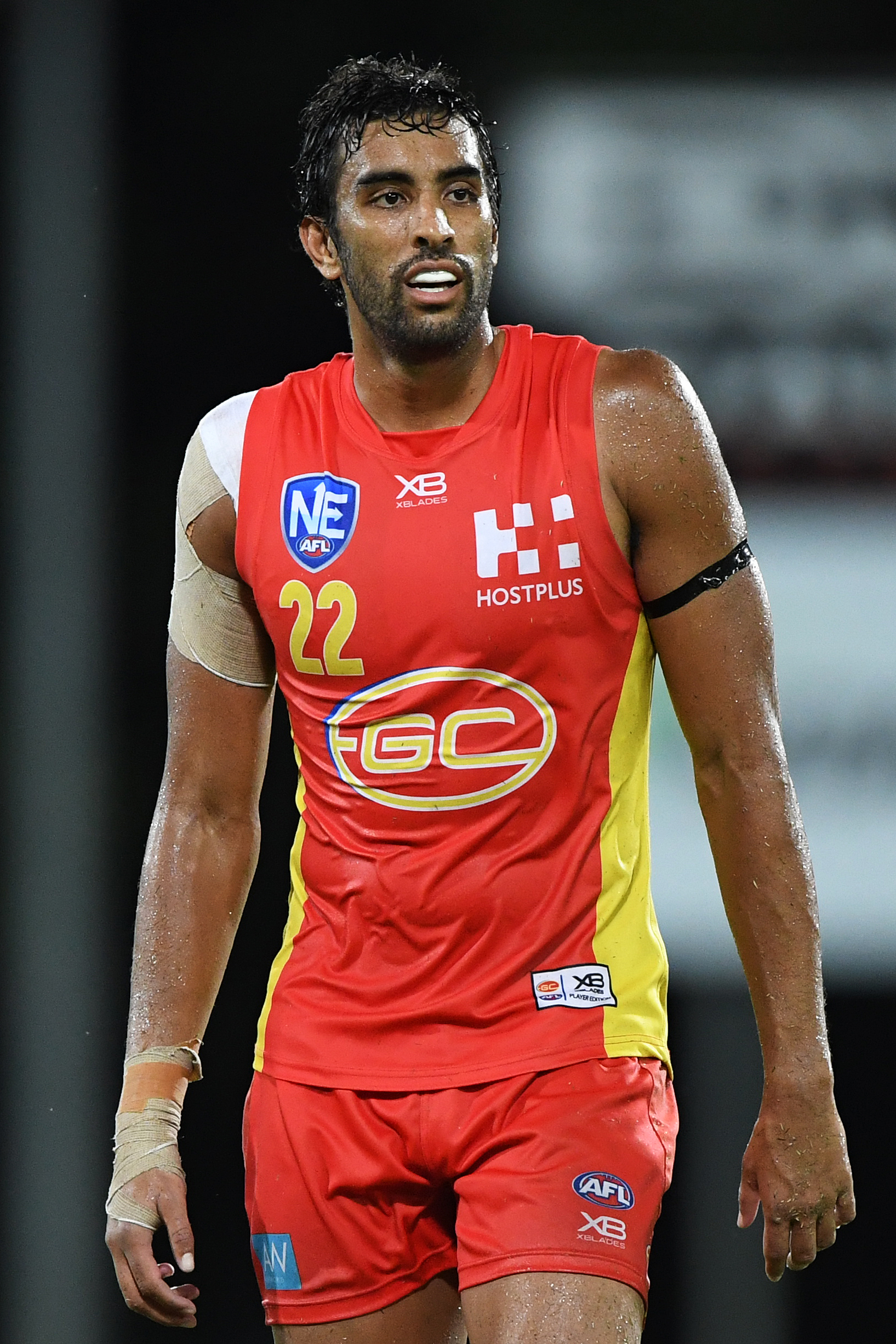
Tom Nicholls playing for the Gold Coast in 2019

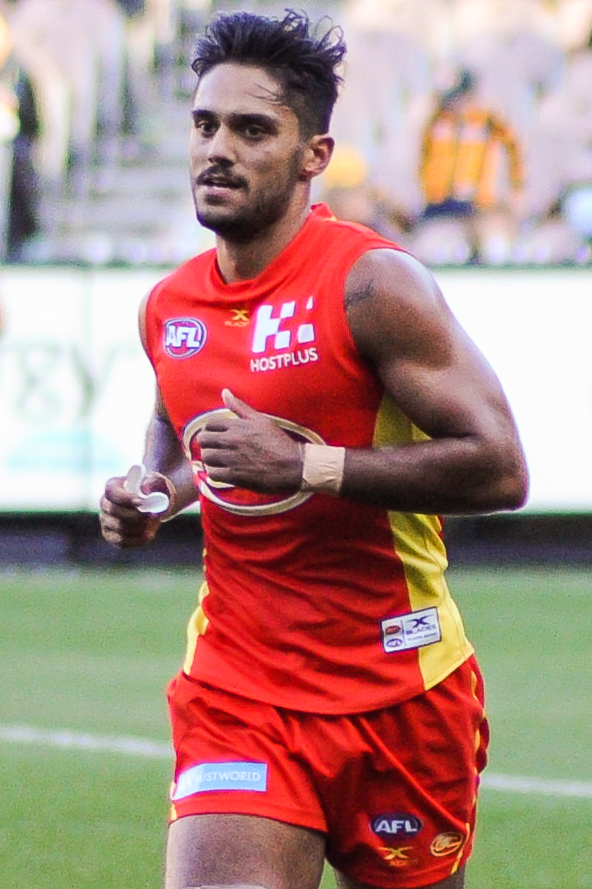
Aaron Hall playing for the Gold Coast in 2017

Currently on an AFL/AFLW senior list

Player	Connection to Fiji	AFL/AFLW Years*	AFL/AFLW Matches*	AFL/AFLW Goals*
Josaia Delana	Father	2025-	3	0
Atu Bosenavulagi	Born	2019–2022	20	1
Esava Ratugolea	Parents	2017-	59	38
Helen Roden	Born	2017	1	0
Nathan Freeman	Parent	2014–2018	2	1
Aaron Hall	Mother	2012–2023	161	94
Tom Nicholls	Mother	2011–2019	45	7
Nic Naitanui	Parents	2009–2023	213	112
Alipate Carlile	Born, mother	2006–2017	167	5
Setanta Ó hAilpín	Mother (Rotuman)	2005 – 2013	88	82
Aisake Ó hAilpín	Mother	2004–2008	-	-
David Rodan	Born, to Fijian-born Tongan mother and Tongan father	2002 – 2013	185	131
Wes Fellowes	Mother	1981–1989	102	28
Charlie Moore	Born	1897–1899	30	34
