= Canada Women's Australian Football League =

- Founded: 2007
- No. of teams: 5

AFL Canada is the governing body for Women's Australian rules football competition in Canada. The primary competition is centred in the Canadian provinces of Alberta, British Columbia, Ontario and Quebec and the national team is known as the "Northern Lights".

== History ==
In 2004, the Toronto-based Etobicoke Kangaroos held footy development clinics at two local girls' schools; Bishop Strachan and St. Clement's School. The program culminated in the first all-female footy match played in Canada.

The participation of senior women in Canadian footy grew dramatically during 2007, when the United States challenged Canada to a senior women's match preceding the Northwind versus Revolution game in Vancouver in August at Thunderbird Stadium in British Columbia. In preparation for that game, the Calgary Kookaburras women's footy club was formed in Alberta – the first women's footy club in Canada and the first independent women's footy club outside of Australia. The Canadian National Team comprised 14 Calgary players and 6 players from Vancouver, and lost two matches against the USA Freedom. Later that year, Calgary went on to participate in the US National Championships in Louisville, Kentucky.

The first women's footy league in Canada was established in Alberta during 2008, involving players from Calgary and the surrounding district. The Hillhurst Nighthawks won the Alberta Premiership. The Calgary Kookaburras travelled to the US National Championships in Colorado Springs, Colorado, and won the women's division championship – defeating the Atlanta Lady Kookaburras in the final.

The Edmonton Emus joined the Alberta league in 2009 and competed alongside Calgary and the Vancouver-based WestCoast Wildcats at the 2009 Canadian National Championships. Calgary won the tournament. The Toronto-based Central Blues and the Montreal Angels, of Ontario and Quebec, respectively, formed as their provinces' first women's footy clubs in 2009.

== AFL Canada National Championship Results – Women ==
| Year | Host city | Champion | Runner up |
|---|---|---|---|
| 2009 | Vancouver, BC | Calgary Kookaburras | WestCoast Wildcats |
| 2010 | Laval, QC | Montréal Angels | Edmonton Emus |
| 2013 | Ottawa, ON | Edmonton Emus | Calgary Kookaburras |

== Leagues ==
- Alberta Footy Women's League

== Clubs ==
Senior

- Calgary Kookaburras Official Site
- Edmonton Emus Official Site
- Montreal Angels Official Site
- Toronto Central Blues Official Site
- West Coast Wildcats (Vancouver) Official Site

Youth Girls

- Alberta Footy Schools Program (Calgary)
- North Delta Junior Football League (Vancouver) Official Site

== National team ==
Canada
- Nickname(s): Northern Lights
- Governing body: AFL Canada

Rankings
- Current: ▼3rd (as of October 2022)

International Cup
- Appearances: 3 (first in 2011)
- Best result: 1st (2014)

The Canadian national team debuted in 2007, when they played two matches against the United States at Thunderbird Stadium in Vancouver, British Columbia. They competed as the "Eagles", were captained by Claire Brown and coached by Jake Anson, both of Calgary.

In 2008, the team moniker changed to the "Northern Lights" to bring a distinct Canadian identity to the team and a national women's footy development program commenced.

In July 2010, the Northern Lights defeated the USA Freedom in two matches played at Humber College in Toronto, Ontario, Canada.

In 2011, the Northern Lights will participate in the 2011 International Cup tournament in Melbourne and Sydney, Australia.

== See also ==
- List of Australian rules football women's leagues
