= Australian Football International =

Organization promoting Australian rules football

- Founded: 2005
- Type: International sport federation
- Headquarters: Melbourne, Australia
- Region served: Worldwide
- Website: www.aflinternational.com

Australian Football International (AFI), is a world development body for the sport of Australian rules football. The organisation has developed a version of the sport known as Footy 9s that it claims will support global expansion of Australian rules football, and lead to it becoming an Olympic sport.

The AFI hosts and supports Aussie rules matches in various countries, with the nine-a-side sport played on soccer, rugby and gridiron pitches, with both contact and non-contact versions of the game. It has also developed the Australian Football Harmony Cup, which has been played annually in Melbourne since 2010 between teams from migrant communities. In January 2018, AFI held its inaugural "United Nations of Footy" march as part of the Australia Day Parade in Melbourne, with participants wearing football jerseys representing their country to "celebrate diversity and harmony."

Australian Football International's headquarters are in Melbourne, Australia. AFI's CEO is Brian Clarke and its board includes high-profile former AFL players Ron Barassi, Allen Aylett and Brian Dixon. The organisation has no official relationship with the Australian Football League, which has hosted its own shortened variation of the sport AFLX.

== See also ==
- AFL Commission
- AFL Europe
- AFL Middle East
- EU Cup
- List of Australian rules football leagues outside Australia
