= Australian Football Harmony Cup =

- Sport: Australian rules football
- Country: Host: Australia
- Most recent champions: Samoa
- Website: Official website

The Australian Football Harmony Cup is an amateur Australian rules football competition featuring teams drawn from Melbourne's migrant communities. The tournament is coordinated by Australian Football International.

It was first held in 2004 in Melbourne around National Harmony Day.

== Background ==
Australian Football is also known for a high participation rate amongst migrants, particularly amongst Europeans. Many such players reach the highest levels and some like Ron Barassi, Stephen Silvagni, Robert DiPierdomenico and Alex Jesaulenko are legends of the game. Some Australian Football League clubs, such as Carlton are renowned for the high number of players of Mediterranean origin.

== Teams ==
The Harmony Cup has included teams representing multicultural communities from Albania, Chile, Croatia, Israel, Ireland, Greece, Italy, Lebanon, Malta, Macedonia, Netherlands, New Zealand, Poland, Samoa, South Sudan, Spain, Switzerland, Tonga, Wales, Vietnam and Turkey. A side drawn from the Melbourne Aboriginal community has also competed at the Harmony Cup. Teams under the banner of "United Nations", "Team Harmony" and "Team Africa" have also competed at the Harmony Cup.

Teams
Albania
Chile
Croatia
Greece
(Republic of Ireland) Ireland
Israel
Italy
Lebanon
Malta
(North Macedonia) Macedonia
Netherlands
Poland
Samoa
South Sudan
Spain
Switzerland
Tonga
Wales
Vietnam
Turkey

== History ==
The first Harmony Cup was held in 2004 at Skinner Reserve, Braybrook in 2004, with Israel 8.9 (57) defeating Samoa 1.0 (6) in the Grand Final.

The 2005 Harmony Cup was won by Greece 5.5 (35) over Turkey 3.3 (21) in front of a crowd of 2,300 at Optus Oval in Carlton, Melbourne.

The Harmony Cup returned in 2010 and has been held every year since.

== Results ==
Year	Champions
2023	Samoa
2022	(Republic of Ireland) Ireland
2021	(Republic of Ireland) Ireland
2020	Italy
2018	(Republic of Ireland) Ireland
2017	Italy
2016	(Republic of Ireland) Ireland
2015	Lebanon
2014	Lebanon
2013	Australia
2012	Albania
2011	Lebanon
2010	Lebanon
2005	Greece
2004	Israel

== See also ==
- List of VFL/AFL players by ethnicity
- List of overseas-born AFL players
