= Australian rules football in Catalonia =

Australian rules football in Catalonia is run by the Catalan League of Australian Football (LFAC), member of Aussie Rules Europe. Aussie rules was first played in 2002 in the city of Valls. During this time the first club, Belfry Valls, was formed.

There have been several teams playing the Catalan League: Belfry Valls, Cornellà Bocs, Barcelona Stars, Valls Fire, Wendells Salou, Coyotes Alt Camp, Gabas Tarragona, Lleida Coiots and Picamoixons Birds. In 2009 the Catalan league was played by Belfry Valls, Cornellà Bocs, Andorra Crows and Perpignan Tigers.

== LFAC champions and Grand Finals ==
Lliga Catalana de Futbol Australià
Year	Champion	Final
2005	Belfry Valls	vs. Wendells Salou 40-30
2006	Belfry Valls	vs. Barcelona Stars 57-48
2007	Belfry Valls	No grand final
2008	Cornellà Bocs	vs. Belfry Valls 115-48
2009	Belfry Valls	vs. Cornellà Bocs 61-37

== International Matches ==
Catalonia
- Governing body: AFL Europe

International Cup
- Appearances: 0

The Catalonia national team has played three EU Cups in 2005, 2007, and 2008.

=== 2005 EU Cup ===
Catalonia was in the first EU Cup in 2005 in London, playing with teams representing Scotland, England, Germany, Sweden, Israel, Netherlands, France, Austria and Belgium. Although other teams had expatriate Australians, all the Catalan players were from Catalonia, finishing in the seventh place.

=== 2007 EU Cup ===
The second EU Cup was held in Hamburg, with twelve teams representing Austria, Belgium, Catalonia, Czech Republic, England, Finland, France, Germany, Netherlands, Spain, Sweden and a team called EU Crusaders. Again, Catalonia played with no expatriates, and this time got the eighth place.

=== 2008 EU Cup ===
The 2008 EU Cup was played in Prague, and Catalonia competed with England, Finland, Czech Republic, France, Germany, The Netherlands, Scotland, Croatia, Sweden, Austria and the EU Crusaders. At the end, Catalans reached the seventh place.
