= List of International Australian rules football tournaments =

Australian rules football is a sport played in over sixty countries around the world.

This list does not include the International Rules Series and tests between Ireland and Australia, which is played in International Rules Football and not Australian Rules Football.

Tournaments and matches may differ from traditional Australian Football in terms of the ground used, the number of players fielded on a team and the number of Australian expatriates permitted to participate. Of these tournaments, the Australian Football International Cup currently has the most strict player eligibility rules and adherence to the Laws of Australian Football.

The following is a list of past and present international tournaments where the sport is or has been played:

Tournament	Regions / Countries	Years of International Competition	Frequency	Website
49th Parallel Cup	USA vs Canada	1999-2015	Held in the intermediary years between the Australian Football International Cup, currently on hiatus.	
Arafura Games (only a demonstration sport)	Asia Pacific	1999-2019	Defunct	
Asian Australian Football Championships (primarily expat)	Asia Pacific	2000-	Annual	
Atlantic Alliance Cup	North Atlantic	2001-	Defunct	
Australian Football International Cup	Worldwide	2002-2017	Defunct	
Bali Nines (Masters tournament)	Oceania	2002-2019	Defunct	
Barassi International Australian Football Youth Tournament	Worldwide	1998-2006	Defunct	
Bermuda Australian Rules Football Championships	North Atlantic	2007 (Postponed indefinitely)	Defunct	
Central European Australian Football League Championships	Central Europe	2003–2004	Defunct	
Dubai Nines	Middle East	2007	Defunct	
EU Cup	Europe	2005–	Annual	
European Championships	Europe	2010-	Triennial	
Four Nations Cup	Southeast Asia	1999-?	Defunct	
Jubilee Australasian Football Carnival	Australasia	1908	N/A	
Narita Cup	Asia	1996-2008	Defunct	
Northern Cup	England, Scotland	2003-?	Defunct	
Oktoberfest Cup	Denmark, France, United Kingdom	1997-early 2000's	Defunct	
Trans-Atlantic Cup	United States, Great Britain	2021-	Currently scheduled for London in August, 2021, and a TBC USA location in 2024.	
Tri-Nations Tournament	Germany, Denmark, Sweden	2006–2007	Defunct	
