= AFL Europe =

Australian rules football governing body in Europe

- Formation: 2010
- Region served: Europe
- Members: 19
- Parent organization: AFL Commission
- Website: AFL Europe

AFL Europe is the regional governing body for Australian rules football in Europe. As of 2018, it organises the AFL Europe Championship and the Euro Cup, and previously managed the European Legion representative team as well being responsible for the organisation of the ANZAC Cup, Fitzpatrick Cup and AFL Europe Champions League.

AFL Europe also organises the European combine which provides a direct pathway to the Australian Football League.

== History ==
Australian football has been played regularly in Europe since the late 1980s when leagues formed in England and Denmark. These first leagues led to the first international game between two European teams was played in 1994 between Great Britain and Denmark.

As more leagues were formed, more international games began to be organised. Historical international competitions played by European teams include the Atlantic Alliance Cup, Central European Australian Football League Championships and the European Australian Football Tri-nations Tournament.

The growth of Australian football in Europe led to the need for a central body that was accountable to the member organisations. At the 2005 EU Cup a conference was held which formed the body Aussie Rules Europe as a promotional body. ARE was superseded after a conference at the 2009 EU Cup the decision was made to form such a body at another conference the following January. The January conference was held in Frankfurt, Germany and the European Australian Football Association was founded. At an October, 2010 conference in Parabiago, Italy the members of the EAFA voted to change the organisations's name to AFL Europe, to fall in line with the Australian Football League.

Headquartered in London, and affiliated to the Australian Football League, AFL Europe's responsibilities include assisting member Leagues and Associations, promoting the sport, managing and delivering major events, overseeing an Elite Talent Identification programme for the AFL and engaging with commercial and community partners.

== Members ==
- Andorra
- Austria
- Catalonia
- Croatia
- Czechia
- Denmark
- England
- Finland
- France
- Germany
- Hungary
- Iceland
- Ireland
- Israel
- Italy
- Netherlands
- Poland
- Portugal
- Russia
- Scotland
- Spain
- Sweden
- Switzerland
- Wales

== Competitions ==
=== Fitzpatrick Cup ===
Beginning in 2013 the annual Colleges and Universities Cup is named after current AFL Chairman, Mike Fitzpatrick. Generally played by Irish and English Universities and Colleges, with the 2016 edition being held in Birmingham for the second year running.

=== AFL Europe Champions League ===
A new event first held in March 2015, contested as a one-day lightning carnival involving the club champions of all the various European leagues. The inaugural Champions League was won by the West London Wildcats in Amsterdam.

=== ANZAC Cup ===
Beginning in 2012 and played in Villers-Bretonneux to commemorate the ANZAC's and the historic liberation of the town in World War I by Australian forces. A team of Australian players selected based on their connection to the ANZAC heritage to play in a game against the France national team, which is a centrepiece of the annual commemorations. The current tally stands at 4 wins to Australia and 3 wins to France.

=== AFL Europe GF Lunch ===
Starting in 2015, the first corporate event held by AFL Europe to raise awareness of Aussie Rules internationally was held in Australia House in London. The function was run in conjunction with the South Australia Club and was hosted by Bill Muirhead (Agent General for South Australia and AFL Europe Ambassador). The ticketed event provided a unique opportunity for attendees to connect with the UK and Australian business communities while creating exposure for AFL Europe and Australia's national sport.

=== Euro Cup ===
An annual nine-a-side footy competition. The Euro Cup was originally known as the EU Cup, the name was changed after teams representing non European Union countries started participating. The Euro Cup is partially intended as a developmental tool to allow participation for countries without enough players to form a full team.

=== European Championships ===
Held every three years, this full format competition determines the Champions of Europe and has taken place twice since the inaugural championship in Denmark and Sweden in 2010. The reigning champions are Ireland who won the most recent championship on home soil with a goal on the final siren against neighbours Great Britain, maintaining a 100% record in the Championships.

AFL Europe also support a range of events and tournaments throughout the UK and Europe which can be seen in the Calendar on the AFL Europe Website.

== European Legion ==
The Legion represents the whole of Europe in Australian football. The Legion's first game was an Under 21 game against the AFL-AIS Academy Australian Under 17 team in London, England. The Europe team had only been together for three days, which showed in the 27.21 (183)-2.0 (12) scoreboard. The Legion's colours are the blue and gold of the Flag of Europe and white.

== See also ==
- Australian rules football in the Middle East
- Australian Football International
- Countries playing Australian rules football
