= 2023 AFL Euro Cup =

2023 Euro Cup
2023 Euro Cup

Tournament details
- Host country: Germany
- Dates: 8 July
- Teams: 15
- Venue(s): Nordmarksportfeld, Kiel

Final positions
- Champions: Ireland
- Runners-up: Wales
- Third place: England
- Fourth place: Denmark

The 2023 Euro Cup of Australian rules football was a Nine-a-side footy tournament held in Kiel, Germany on the 8th of Germany, 2023. The tournament featured 15 Men's teams and 10 Women's teams. Ireland won both the Men's and Women's competitions, defeating the Welsh Red Dragons in the Men's final and the Scottish Sirens in the Women's Final. It was the Irish men's third and the Irish women's sixth Euro Cup Championship.

== Teams ==
=== Men ===
- Austrian Avalanche
- Croatian Knights
- England Dragonslayers
- French Coqs
- German Eagles
- Irish Warriors
- Netherland Flying Dutchmen
- Israel Beasts
- Scottish Clansmen
- Welsh Red Dragons
- Denmark Vikings
- Swedish Elks
- Swiss Wolves
- Ulster Wolfhounds
- Polish Devils

=== Women ===
- Crusaders
- England
- France
- Ireland
- Scotland
- Sweden
- Poland
- Northern Ireland
- Germany
- Switzerland

== Group Stages ==
During the first stage of the tournament. The 15 participating men's teams were split into three groups of 5. While the 10 women's team were split into 2 groups of 5.

=== Men's Group A ===
Team	Games	W	D	L	PTS	PF	PA	%
Denmark Vikings	4	4	0	0	16	176	53	332
England Dragonslayers	4	3	0	1	12	156	63	247
French Coqs	4	2	0	2	8	124	89	139
Scottish Clansmen	4	1	0	3	4	79	170	46
Polish Devils	4	0	0	4	0	30	190	15

=== Men's Group B ===
Team	Games	W	D	L	PTS	PF	PA	%
Welsh Red Dragos	4	4	0	0	16	121	46	263
German Eagles (M)	4	3	0	1	12	126	73	172
Swedish Elks	4	2	0	2	8	106	64	165
Israel Beasts	4	1	0	3	4	66	116	56
Ulster Wolfhounds	4	0	0	4	0	35	155	22

=== Men's Group C ===
Team	Games	W	D	L	PTS	PF	PA	%
Irish Warriors	4	4	0	0	16	268	39	687
Croatian Knights	4	3	0	1	12	149	96	155
Netherland Flying Dutchmen	4	2	0	2	8	115	129	89
Austrian Avalanche	4	1	0	3	4	53	185	28
Swiss Wolves	4	0	0	4	0	47	183	25

=== Women's Group A ===
Team	Games	W	D	L	PTS	PF	PA	%
England Vixens	4	4	0	0	16			
Swedish Ravens	4	3	0	1	12			
French Gauloises	4	2	0	2	8			
European Crusaders	4	1	0	3	4			
Polish Angels	4	0	0	4	0			

=== Women's Group B ===
Team	Games	W	D	L	PTS	PF	PA	%
Irish Banshees	4	4	0	0	16			
Scottish Sirens	4	3	0	1	12			
Ulster Machas	4	2	0	2	8			
German Eagles (W)	4	1	0	3	4			
Swiss Heidis	4	0	0	4	0			

== Finals ==
Following the group stages, the top four teams after the group games would play off against each other in the main semi-finals. While other teams played off for final placements.

Men's Finals

13th Place Playoff
Team	Score
Swiss Wolves	20
Ulter Wolfhounds	22

11th Place Playoff
Team	Score
Scottish Clansmen	63
Austrian Avalanc	14

9th Place Playoff
Team	Score
Netherland Flying Dutchmen	19
Israel Beasts	51

7th Place Playoff
Team	Score
Swedish Elks	18
French Coqs	53

5th Place Playoff
Team	Score
German Eagles (M)	26
Croatian Knights	42

Semi Final 1
Team	Score
Irish Warriors	49
England Dragonslayers	10

Semi Final 2
Team	Score
Denmark Vikings	14
Welsh Red Dragons	22

3rd Place Playoff
Team	Score
England Dragonslayers	38
Denmark Vikings	17

Grand Final
Team	Score
Irish Wariors	47
Welsh Red Dragons	17

Women's Finals

9th Place Playoff
Team	Score
Polish Angeles	33
Swiss Heidis	8

7th Place Playoff
Team	Score
European Crusaders	19
German Eagles (W)	38

5th Place Playoff
Team	Score
French Gauloises	14
Ulster Machas	25

Semi Final 1
Team	Score
England Vixens	16
Scottish Sirens	27

Semi Final 2
Team	Score
Irish Banshees	58
Swedish Ravens	21

3rd Place Playoff
Team	Score
England Vixens	24
Swedish Ravens	23

Grand Final
Team	Score
Scottish Sirens	18
Irish Banshees	29

== Final standings ==
Final Standings (Men)

1. Ireland
2. Wales
3. England
4. Denmark
5. Croatia
6. Germany
7. France
8. Sweden
9. Israel
10. The Netherlands
11. Scotland
12. Austria
13. Northern Ireland (Ulster Wolfhounds)
14. Switzerland
15. Poland

Final Standings (Women)

1. Ireland
2. Scotland
3. England
4. Sweden
5. Northern Ireland (Ulster Machas)
6. France
7. Germany
8. European Crusaders
9. Poland
10. Switzerland
