= Euro Cup (AFL) =

International Australian rules football tournament

Australian Football Euro Cup
- Most recent season or competition: 2023 AFL Euro Cup
- Sport: Australian rules football
- First season: 2005
- No. of teams: 2019: 16 men's & 8 women's
- Country: Host: 2025 Netherlands
- Most recent champions: Men's: France (1st title); Women's: (Republic of Ireland) Ireland (7th title)
- Most titles: Men's: England (6 titles); Women's: (Republic of Ireland) Ireland (7 titles)
- Website: www.afleurope.org

The Euro Cup (formerly known as the EU Cup) is an international Australian rules football tournament played between European national teams. Played under nine-a-side footy rules, the tournament was first held at Chiswick in London, England in 2005, created by Australian Football International. A women's cup has been played between more than two teams since the 2014 tournament.

The Euro Cup is an event hosted annually by AFL Europe.

Eligibility rules are very strict compared those of other international competitions and are similar to the AFL International Cup. Generally speaking players must be a citizen of the country they represent and have lived there through roughly middle school and high school ages (when most players usually learn the key skills required) ensuring that expatriate Australians are ineligible to compete.

== Results ==
=== Men's results ===
Year	Date	Host	Champions	Runners up	Third	Fourth	Number of Men's teams
2026	4 July	Newcastle, England	France	Israel	Wales	(Republic of Ireland) Ireland	16
2025	12 July	Amsterdam, Netherlands	France	Wales	(Republic of Ireland) Ireland	Germany	15
2024	5 October	Kiel, Germany	(Republic of Ireland) Ireland	Northern Ireland	Croatia	Wales	14
2023	8 July	Kiel, Germany	(Republic of Ireland) Ireland	Wales	England	Denmark	13
2022		Edinburgh, Scotland	England	Germany	(Republic of Ireland) Ireland	Croatia	11
2021		Amsterdam, Netherlands	Cancelled				
2020		Stirling, Scotland	Cancelled				
2019		Norrtälje, Sweden	England	(Republic of Ireland) Ireland	Germany	France	16
2018		(Republic of Ireland) Cork, Ireland	Denmark	(Republic of Ireland) Ireland	Croatia	England	15
2017		Bordeaux, France	England	(Republic of Ireland) Ireland	Germany	France	14
2016		Lisbon, Portugal	Croatia	(Republic of Ireland) Ireland	England	Germany	15
2015		Umag, Croatia	Denmark	England	Croatia	(Republic of Ireland) Ireland	12
2014		London, England	Denmark	Croatia	(Republic of Ireland) Ireland	Germany	16
2013		Bordeaux, France	England	France	Croatia	Italy	12
2012		Edinburgh, Scotland	(Republic of Ireland) Ireland	Denmark	England	Italy	16
2011		Belfast, Northern Ireland	(Republic of Ireland) Ireland	Croatia	England	Italy	18
2010		Milan, Italy	Croatia	Netherlands	(Republic of Ireland) Ireland	England	15
2009		Samobor, Croatia	England	Netherlands	Croatia	Spain	15
2008		Prague, Czech Republic	England	Croatia	Germany	Sweden	12
2007		Hamburg, Germany	Sweden	Germany	England	Spain	12
2005		London, England	Belgium	Sweden	Netherlands	Germany	10

=== Women's Results ===
Year	Date	Host	Champions	Runners up	Third place	Fourth place	Number of Women's Teams
2026	4 July	Newcastle, England	(Republic of Ireland) Ireland	England	Scotland	France	10
2025	12 July	Amsterdam, Netherlands	(Republic of Ireland) Ireland	England	Scotland	Germany	8
2024	5 October	Kiel, Germany	(Republic of Ireland) Ireland	England	Scotland	Germany	8
2023	8 July	Kiel, Germany	(Republic of Ireland) Ireland	Scotland	England	Sweden	9
2022		Edinburgh, Scotland	(Republic of Ireland) Ireland	England	Scotland	Wales	11
2021		Amsterdam, Netherlands	Cancelled				
2020		Stirling, Scotland	Cancelled				
2019		Norrtälje, Sweden	(Republic of Ireland) Ireland	England	Germany	Sweden	8
2018		(Republic of Ireland) Cork, Ireland	(Republic of Ireland) Ireland	England	Sweden	Croatia	9
2017		Bordeaux, France	England	(Republic of Ireland) Ireland	Sweden	France	7
2016		Lisbon, Portugal	(Republic of Ireland) Ireland	England	Croatia	Sweden	7
2015		Umag, Croatia	England	Denmark	France	Croatia	6
2014		London, England	(Republic of Ireland) Ireland	England	Scotland	Denmark	5
2013		Bordeaux, France	(Europe) Crusaders	France	Croatia	Italy	2

== Tournaments ==
=== 2024 Euro Cup ===
The 2024 Euro Cup was held in Kiel, Germany for the second straight year. Ireland won both the Men's and Women's titles, both of whom came into the tournament as reigning champions.

The Men's team beat Wales in the semi-finals and the Northern Irish team in the grand final. While the Irish women's team defeated Germans in the semi-final and English in their grand final.

=== 2023 Euro Cup ===
The 2023 Euro Cup was held in Kiel, Germany. Ireland won both the Men's and Women's titles, retaining the Women's cup for the 4th tournament in succession.

The Men's team beat reigning champions England in the semi-finals and the Welsh team in the grand final. While the Irish women's team defeated Sweden in the semi-final and Scotland in their grand final.

=== 2022 Euro Cup ===
The 2022 Euro Cup was held in Edinburgh, Scotland. In the Men's Division Germany finished as runners-up, and England won their sixth Euro Cup title. In the Women's Division England finished as runners-up, and Ireland won the 3 in a row to claim their eighth Euro Cup title.

=== 2020 & 2021 Euro Cup (Cancelled) ===
The 2020 (Stirling, Scotland) and 2021 (Amsterdam, Netherlands) Cups were both cancelled due to the COVID-19 pandemic.

=== 2019 Euro Cup ===
The 2019 Euro Cup was held in Norrtälje, Sweden. 16 men's and 8 women's teams took part. In the Men's Division Ireland finished as runners-up for the fourth year in a row, and England won their fifth Euro Cup title.

Meanwhile, in the Women's Division, a strong Irish side continued the duopoly of titles between them and England, defeating the England Vixens in the final.

=== 2018 Euro Cup ===
The 2018 Euro Cup was held in Cork, Ireland on Saturday 13 October 2018. 15 men's and a record 9 women's teams took part. In the Men's Division Ireland finished as runners-up for the third year in a row, and to a third different opponent as Denmark won their third Euro Cup title and first since 2015.

Meanwhile, in the Women's Division, a strong Irish side continued the duopoly of titles between them and England, defeating the England Vixens in the final 5.3 (33) to 1.3 (8).

=== 2017 Euro Cup ===
The 2017 Euro Cup was held in Bordeaux, France on Saturday 7 October 2017. 14 men's and 7 women's teams competed including teams from Germany, Austria, Jerusalem, Switzerland, Ireland, Netherlands, Scotland, France, Croatia, Czech Republic, Russia, England, Wales, Sweden and Denmark. England defeated Ireland 58 to 8 in the men's final with England defeating Ireland 38 to 14 in the women's final.

=== 2016 Euro Cup ===
The 2016 Euro Cup was held in Lisbon, Portugal on Saturday 8 October 2016. 15 men's and 7 women's teams competed including teams from Croatia, Wales, Austria, Italy, Ireland, France, Jerusalem, Russia, Germany, Scotland, Sweden, Denmark, Norway, Portugal, England, European Crusaders and the Netherlands. Croatia defeated Ireland 53 to 39 in the men's final with Ireland defeating England 16 to 7 in the women's final. Charlie Steel (Scotland) was the men's player of the tournament after recovering from a near career ending collarbone break earlier in the year.

=== 2015 Euro Cup ===
The 2015 Euro cup was held in Umag, Croatia on Saturday 10 October 2015. 12 men's and 6 women's teams competed including teams from Norway, European Crusaders, Jerusalem, Netherlands, Germany, Scotland, France, Austria, Ireland, England, Denmark, Croatia and Sweden. Denmark defeated England 47 to 26 in the men's final with England defeating Denmark 54 to 6 in the women's final.

=== 2014 Euro Cup ===
The 2014 Euro Cup was held in London, England on Saturday 11 October 2014. 16 men's and 5 women's teams competed including teams from Norway, Netherlands, Sweden, Scotland, France, England, Ireland, Austria, European Crusaders, Croatia, Denmark, Catalunya, Germany, Spain, Wales and Italy. Denmark defeated Croatia 6.4.40 to 2.4.16 in the men's final with Ireland defeating England 5.1.31 to 4.2.26 in the women's final.

=== 2013 Euro Cup ===
The 2013 EU Cup was held in Bordeaux, France on Saturday 21 September 2013. 12 national men's teams competed including: Austria, Catalonia, Croatia, England, European Crusaders, France, Finland, Iceland, Ireland, Italy, Norway and Spain. Two women's teams, France and the European Crusaders, competed in a women's match.

In the Grand final England defeated France 92–15.

=== 2012 Euro Cup ===
The 2012 event was held in Edinburgh, Scotland on Saturday 22 September 2012. 16 national men's teams competed including: Croatia, Ireland, England, Italy, Spain, Wales, France, Scotland, Germany, Denmark, Austria, Finland, Sweden, Iceland, Czech Republic and Norway (first participation). Two women's teams, Ireland and the European Crusaders, competed in a women's match.

Ireland defeated Denmark in the final by 1 point.

=== 2011 Euro Cup ===
The 2011 Euro Cup was held in Belfast, Northern Ireland on Saturday 8 October 2011. 18 national men's teams competed in the tournament. Final results were: 1. Ireland, 2. Croatia, 3. England, 4. Italy, 5. France, 6. Scotland, 7. Wales, 8. Spain, 9. European Crusaders, 10. Russia (1st time competitors), 11. Denmark, 12. Germany, 13. Finland, 14. Sweden, 15. Netherlands, 16. Austria, 17. Iceland, 18. Catalonia.

Ireland defeated Switzerland in the women's match.

=== 2010 Euro Cup ===
The 2010 event was held in Parabiago on the outskirts of Milan, Italy on Saturday 2 October 2010, and the competing teams were Austria, Catalonia, Croatia, Czech Republic, England, EU Crusaders, France, Germany, Ireland, Italy, Scotland, Spain, Switzerland, The Netherlands and Wales.

In the final Croatia defeated the Netherlands by 5 points.

For the first time a women's international match took place during the competition. Ireland defeated Italy by 10 points in the one-off match.

=== 2009 EU Cup ===
The 2009 event was held in Samobor, Croatia on the weekend of 3 to 5 October, and the competing teams were England, Finland, Czech Republic, Andorra, Croatia, France, Scotland, Austria, Germany, The Netherlands, Iceland, Italy, Spain, Ireland and the EU Crusaders.

In the final, England defeated Netherlands.

=== 2008 EU Cup ===
The 2008 event was held in Prague, Czech Republic on the weekend of 11 and 12 October, and the competing teams were England, Finland, Czech Republic, France, Germany, Catalonia, The Netherlands, Scotland, Croatia, Sweden, Austria and the EU Crusaders. In the final, England defeated Croatia 107–59.

=== 2007 EU Cup ===
The 2007 event was held in Hamburg, Germany on the weekend of 15 and 16 September, and was won by Sweden who defeated Germany in the final.

Twelve teams representing Austria, Belgium, Catalonia, Czech Republic, England, Finland, France, Germany, Netherlands, Spain, Sweden and a team called EU Crusaders attended the 2007 EU Cup. This tournament limited squad sizes to 15 players, of which no more than ten could be Australians.

=== 2005 EU Cup ===
Ten teams representing Scotland, England, Germany, Sweden, Israel, Netherlands, France, Austria, Catalonia and Belgium attended the 2005 EU Cup.

There was no restriction on the numbers of expatriate Australians competing in the event, but a handicap system was put in places whereby sides received a 2-point handicap for each local national and 1 point for each other non-Australian in their squads.

The tournament was won by Belgium who defeated Sweden in the final.

== Team record ==
Men's Record
Team	Champions	Runners-up	3rd Place	4th Place
England	6	1	5	2
(Republic of Ireland) Ireland	4	4	4	2
Denmark	3	1	0	1
Croatia	2	3	4	1
France	2	1	0	2
Sweden	1	1	0	1
Belgium	1	0	0	0
Germany	0	2	3	4
Wales	0	2	1	1
Netherlands	0	2	1	0
Israel	0	1	0	0
Italy	0	0	0	3
Spain	0	0	0	2

Women's Record
Team	Champions	Runners-up	3rd Place	4th Place
(Republic of Ireland) Ireland	9	1	0	0
England	2	8	1	0
(Europe) Crusaders	1	0	0	0
Scotland	0	1	5	0
France	0	1	1	2
Denmark	0	1	0	1
Sweden	0	0	2	3
Croatia	0	0	1	2
Germany	0	0	1	2
Wales	0	0	0	1

== Participation ==
Men's Participation and Placings
Team	2005	2007	2008	2009	2010	2011	2012	2013	2014	2015	2016	2017	2018	2019	2020	2021	2022	2023	2024
England	=5	3	1	1	4	3	3	1	6	2	3	1	4	1	NA	NA	1	3	NA
(Republic of Ireland) Ireland	-	-	-	6	3	1	1	5	3	4	2	2	2	2	NA	NA	3	1	1
Germany	4	2	3	8	7	12	6	-	4	5	4	3	7	3	NA	NA	2	6	10
France	=9	7	6	12	10	5	9	2	9	6	5	4	5	4	NA	NA	7	7	5
Wales	-	-	-	-	8	7	12	-	5	-	6	5	9	7	NA	NA	5	2	4
Netherlands	3	9	9	2	2	15	-	-	15	9	9	6	6	8	NA	NA	11	10	11
Croatia	-	-	2	3	1	2	5	3	2	3	1	7	3	6	NA	NA	4	5	3
Austria	=9	=11	12	14	12	16	16	9	10	7	10	8	13	15	NA	NA	10	12	13
Czech Republic	-	5	11	15	13	-	15	-	-	-	-	9	12	12	NA	NA	NA	NA	NA
Scotland	7	-	8	5	9	6	11	-	11	8	=7	10	8	9	NA	NA	6	11	9
(Israel) (Palestine) Jerusalem	-	-	-	-	-	-	-	-	-	12	=13	11	-	-	NA	NA	NA	NA	NA
Sweden	2	1	4	-	-	14	7	-	7	-	-	12	10	5	NA	NA	9	8	8
Russia	-	-	-	-	-	10	-	-	-	-	=13	13	14	10	NA	NA	NA	NA	NA
Switzerland	-	-	-	-	11	-	-	-	-	-	-	14	15	11	NA	NA	13	14	14
(European Union) Crusaders	-	=11	10	10	15	9	-	10	12	10	=7	-	-	-	NA	NA	NA	NA	NA
Italy	-	-	-	13	6	4	4	4	8	-	=11	-	-						
Norway	-	-	-	-	-	-	13	11	13	11	=11	-	-						
Portugal	-	-	-	-	-	-	-	-	-	-	=13	-	-						
Denmark	-	-	-	-	-	11	2	-	1	1	-	-	1	-	NA	NA	NA	4	7
Spain	-	4	-	4	5	8	10	7	14	-	-	-	-	-	NA	NA	NA	NA	NA
Catalonia	8	8	7	-	14	18	-	12	16	-	-	-	-	-	NA	NA	NA	NA	NA
Finland	-	6	5	7	-	13	8	6	-	-	-	-	-	14	NA	NA	NA	NA	NA
Iceland	-	-	-	9	-	17	14	8	-	-	-	-	-	-	NA	NA	NA	NA	NA
Andorra	-	-	-	11	-	-	-	-	-	-	-	-	-	-	NA	NA	NA	NA	NA
Belgium	1	10	-	-	-	-	-	-	-	-	-	-	-	-	NA	NA	NA	NA	NA
Israel	=5	-	-	-	-	-	-	-	-	-	-	-	11	13	NA	NA	8	9	6
Northern Ireland	NA	NA	NA	NA	NA	NA	NA	NA	NA	NA	NA	NA	NA	NA	NA	NA	NA	13	2

== See also ==
- AFL Europe Championship
