= 2016 EU Cup Australian rules football =

2016 Euro Cup
2016 EU Cup

Tournament details
- Host country: Portugal
- Dates: 8 October
- Teams: 15
- Venue(s): Lisbon

The 2016 Euro Cup of Australian rules football is a Nine-a-side footy tournament held in Lisbon, Portugal on 8 October 2016, with 15 national men's teams and seven women's teams.

== Teams ==
=== Men ===
- Austria
- Croatia
- (Europe) Crusaders
- England
- France
- Germany
- (Republic of Ireland) Ireland
- Italy
- Netherlands
- Norway
- (Europe) Peace Team Lions
- Portugal
- Russia
- Scotland
- Wales

=== Women ===
- Croatia
- Denmark
- England
- France
- (Republic of Ireland) Ireland
- Scotland
- Sweden
