= 2024 AFL Euro Cup =

2024 Euro Cup
2024 Euro Cup

Tournament details
- Host country: Germany
- Dates: 5 October
- Teams: 14 Male, 8 Female
- Venue(s): Nordmarksportfeld, Kiel

Final positions
- Champions: Ireland
- Runners-up: Northern Ireland
- Third place: Croatia
- Fourth place: Wales

The 2024 Euro Cup of Australian rules football was a Nine-a-side footy tournament held in Kiel, Germany on 5 October 2024. The tournament featured 14 Men's teams and 8 Women's teams. Ireland won both the Men's and Women's competitions, defeating Northern Ireland in the Men's final and England in the Women's Final. It was the Irish men's fourth and the Irish women's seventh Euro Cup Championship.

Two pitches from the tournament were streamed via AFL Europe's YouTube Channel, while other national teams ran live streams for followers via their social media platforms.

== Teams ==
=== Men's ===
- Austria
- Croatia
- Denmark
- France
- Germany
- Ireland
- Israel
- Netherlands
- Northern Ireland
- Poland
- Scotland
- Sweden
- Switzerland
- Wales

=== Women's ===
- Croatia
- England
- Germany
- Ireland
- Northern Ireland
- Poland
- Scotland
- Sweden
- Scotland
- Sweden

== Group Stages ==
In the first stage of the tournament, all the teams were split into groups. The mens teams were split into four groups, which included 2 groups of 4 and 2 groups of 3. While each of the teams in the groups played off against each other once, teams in groups with only three teams played an additional crossover game. On the women's side of the draw, the teams were split into 2 groups of 4.

=== Men's Group A ===
Team	Played	Wins	Draws	Losses	Pts	PF	PA	%
Croatia	3	3	0	0	12	99	29	341
France	3	2	0	1	8	95	47	202
Netherlands	3	1	0	2	4	62	89	70
Austria	3	0	0	3	0	14	105	13

Teams	Total
France	35
Netherlands	21

Teams	Total
Croatia	27
Austria	6

Teams	Total
Netherlands	8
Croatia	46

Teams	Total
Austria	0
France	45

Teams	Total
Croatia	26
France	15

Teams	Total
Austria	8
Netherlands	33

=== Men's Group B ===
Team	Played	Wins	Draws	Losses	Pts	PF	PA	%
Ireland	3	3	0	0	12	145	33	439
Israel	3	2	0	1	8	112	57	196
Scotland	3	1	0	2	4	102	68	150
Switzerland	3	0	0	3	0	4	205	2

Teams	Total
Israel	18
Ireland	28

Teams	Total
Scotland	60
Switzerland	2

Teams	Total
Switzerland	2
Israel	62

Teams	Total
Ireland	34
Scotland	15

Teams	Total
Ireland	83
Switzerland	0

Teams	Total
Israel	32
Scotland	27

=== Men's Group C ===
Team	Played	Wins	Draws	Losses	Pts	PF	PA	%
Northern Ireland	2	2	0	0	8	61	29	210
Denmark	2	1	0	1	4	57	60	95
Germany	2	0	0	2	0	34	63	5

Teams	Total
Germany	7
Northern Ireland	28

Teams	Total
Northern Ireland	33
Denmark	22

Teams	Total
Denmark	35
Germany	27

=== Men's Group D ===
Team	Played	Wins	Draws	Losses	Pts	PF	PA	%
Wales	2	2	0	0	8	82	14	596
Sweden	2	1	0	1	4	52	52	100
Poland	2	0	0	2	0	26	94	28

Teams	Total
Poland	18
Sweden	46

Teams	Total
Wales	48
Poland	8

Teams	Total
Sweden	6
Wales	34

=== Cross Group Games ===
Teams	Total
Sweden	8
Germany	43

Teams	Total
Denmark	22
Wales	35

Teams	Total
Northern Ireland	45
Poland	10

=== Women's Group A ===
Team	Played	Wins	Draws	Losses	Pts	PF	PA	%
England	3	3	0	0	12	191	0	
Germany	3	2	0	1	8	47	77	61
Poland	3	1	0	2	4	29	74	39
Northern Ireland	3	0	0	3	0	18	134	13

Teams	Total
England	85
Northern Ireland	0

Teams	Total
Poland	6
Germany	21

Teams	Total
Germany	26
Northern Ireland	0

Teams	Total
England	35
Poland	0

Teams	Total
Germany	0
England	71

Teams	Total
Northern Ireland	18
Poland	23

=== Women's Group B ===
Team	Played	Wins	Draws	Losses	Pts	PF	PA	%
Ireland	3	3	0	0	12	195	25	780
Scotland	3	2	0	1	8	172	28	614
Sweden	3	1	0	2	4	42	111	38
Croatia	3	0	0	3	0	1	246	0

Teams	Total
Scotland	49
Sweden	2

Teams	Total
Ireland	107
Croatia	1

Teams	Total
Ireland	26
Scotland	18

Teams	Total
Croatia	0
Sweden	34

Teams	Total
Sweden	6
Ireland	62

Teams	Total
Croatia	0
Scotland	105

== Finals ==
=== Men's Final ===
The Mens draw was then divided into four groups. The top placed teams from all four groups, Croatia, Ireland, Northern Ireland, and Wales, would play off in the semi-finals. All the second placed teams, France, Israel, Denmark, and Sweden, would play off for spots 5 to 8. Scotland, Germany, and the Netherlands played off in against each other for spots 9 to 11, while Poland, Austria, and Switzerland, played off for spots 12 to 14.

=== Women's Final ===
The Women's final was drawn evenly between the top two teams of both groups progressing to the semi-finals. This included England, Ireland, Scotland, and Germany. While the remaining teams competed against each other for placements 5 to 8, including Poland, Sweden, Croatia, and Northern Ireland.

== Final standings ==
=== Men's standings ===
1. Ireland
2. Northern Ireland
3. Croatia
4. Wales
5. France
6. Israel
7. Denmark
8. Sweden
9. Scotland
10. Germany
11. Netherlands
12. Poland
13. Austria
14. Switzerland

=== Women's standings ===
1. Ireland
2. England
3. Scotland
4. Germany
5. Sweden
6. Poland
7. Croatia
8. Northern Ireland
