= AFL Switzerland =

Australian rules football league

- Sport: Australian rules football
- Jurisdiction: Switzerland
- Founded: 2019
- Affiliation: AFL Europe
- Location: Switzerland
- President: Stefan Burgener

Official website
- www.aflswitzerland.ch
- (Switzerland)

AFL Switzerland is an Australian rules football league in Switzerland. Founded in 2019, it is an official affiliation of AFL Europe. For the 2022 season, there are four clubs, plus a combined team, the Northern Bears. Teams are composed of males and females.

== History ==
AFL in Switzerland was begun in Lugano around 2009. A men's team partook in the AFL Italia League in 2010. From this team developed a Swiss national team, who competed in the 2010 Euro Cup, and the Lugano men's team competed in the Italian league. A women's team competed in the 2011 Euro Cup in Belfast, Northern Ireland. Due to a lack of funding, the teams did not return to either competition.

In 2016, a group of amateurs began holding Australian rules football training sessions in Winterthur, Switzerland. This continued through 2017, culminating in the sending of a team to the 2017 Euro Cup in Bordeaux.

In February 2017, the Winterthur Lions AFC was officially founded. Two new clubs, the Basel Dragons AFC and the Geneva Jets, were founded in October 2018.

AFL Switzerland was established in 2019 and completed its inaugural season with the above three clubs in the senior ladder. Zurich Giants joined the league for the 2020 season. Rapperswil-Jona started up in January 2020 and planned to have teams ready for 2021.

== Clubs ==
Location map of current clubs in the senior division.

There are four clubs in four cities: Basel (the Dragons), Geneva (the Jets), Winterthur (the Lions) and Zürich (the Giants).

The Northern Bears is a combined team that plays in the reserves division. Clubs who have representatives in the Bears team are marked with an asterisk below.

Club	Moniker	Home	Teams	Established
Basel	Dragons	Sportplatz Pruntrutermatte, Basel	Senior, Reserve*	2018
Geneva	Jets	Centre sportif de Vessy, Geneva	Senior, Reserve	2018
Northern Bears	Bears		Reserve	2018
Winterthur	Lions	Fussballplatz Talgut, Winterthur	Senior, Reserve*	2017
Zurich	Giants	Zurich	Senior	2019

== Season ==
The AFL Switzerland seasons run from April or May to September. For the 2022 season, the rounds take place on 30 April, 14 May, 11 June, 2 July, 27 August, with the Grand Final on 17 September.

=== Format ===
There are five rounds, followed by a Grand Final in September. At the end of each round, there is a boat race. Teams play each other five times during the regular season.

== See also ==
- AFL Europe
- Australian rules football in Europe
