= 2013 EU Cup Australian rules football =

2013 Euro Cup
2013 EU Cup

Tournament details
- Host country: France
- Dates: 21 September
- Teams: 14
- Venue: Bordeaux

Final positions
- Champions: England (3rd title)
- Runners-up: France
- Third place: Croatia
- Fourth place: Italy

The 2013 Euro Cup of Australian rules football was a 9-a-side Footy tournament held in Bordeaux, France on 21 September 2013, with 12 national men's teams and two women's teams. The men's tournament was won by England who defeated France in the Grand Final by 77 points. The women's match was won by the European Crusaders who defeated France 45–26.

== Teams ==
- Pierre de Coubertin Group
  - Croatia
  - (Europe) Crusaders
  - Finland
- Antonin Berodier Group
  - Catalonia
  - England
  - Iceland
- Léo Lagrange Group
  - France
  - (Republic of Ireland) Ireland
  - Norway
- Daniel Jackson Group
  - Spain
  - Austria
  - Italy
- Women's Teams
  - France
  - (Europe) Crusaders

== Results ==
=== Group stage ===
- Pierre de Coubertin Group
  - Finland 70 d (Europe) Crusaders 3
  - Croatia 102 d (Europe) Crusaders 7
  - Croatia 42 d Finland 15
- Antonin Berodier Group
  - Iceland 66 d Catalonia 9
  - England 116 d Catalonia 2
  - England 66 d Iceland 13
- Léo Lagrange Group
  - France 41 d Norway 26
  - (Republic of Ireland) Ireland 68 d Norway 4
  - France 34 d (Republic of Ireland) Ireland 33
- Daniel Jackson Group
  - Spain 37 d Austria 17
  - Italy 58 d Austria 15
  - Italy 53 d Spain 33

=== Semi-finals ===
- Euro Plate Championship
  - (Europe) Crusaders 81 d Catalonia 10
  - Austria 34 d Norway 29
- Euro Bowl Championship
  - Finland 75 d Iceland 6
  - (Republic of Ireland) Ireland 98 d Spain 24
- Euro Cup Championship
  - England 35 d Croatia 29
  - France 68 d Italy 49

=== Finals ===
- 11th-place match
  - Norway 73 d Catalonia 19
- 9th-place match (Euro Plate Champion)
  - Austria 39 d (Europe) Crusaders 32
- 7th-place match
  - Spain 44 d Iceland 23
- 5th-place match (Euro Bowl Champion)
  - (Republic of Ireland) Ireland 78 d Finland 5
- 3rd-place match
  - Croatia 77 d Italy 34
- Grand Final (Euro Cup Champion)
  - England 92 d France 15

=== Women's Match ===
- (Europe) Crusaders 45 d France 26

Results
