= Australian rules football in Europe =

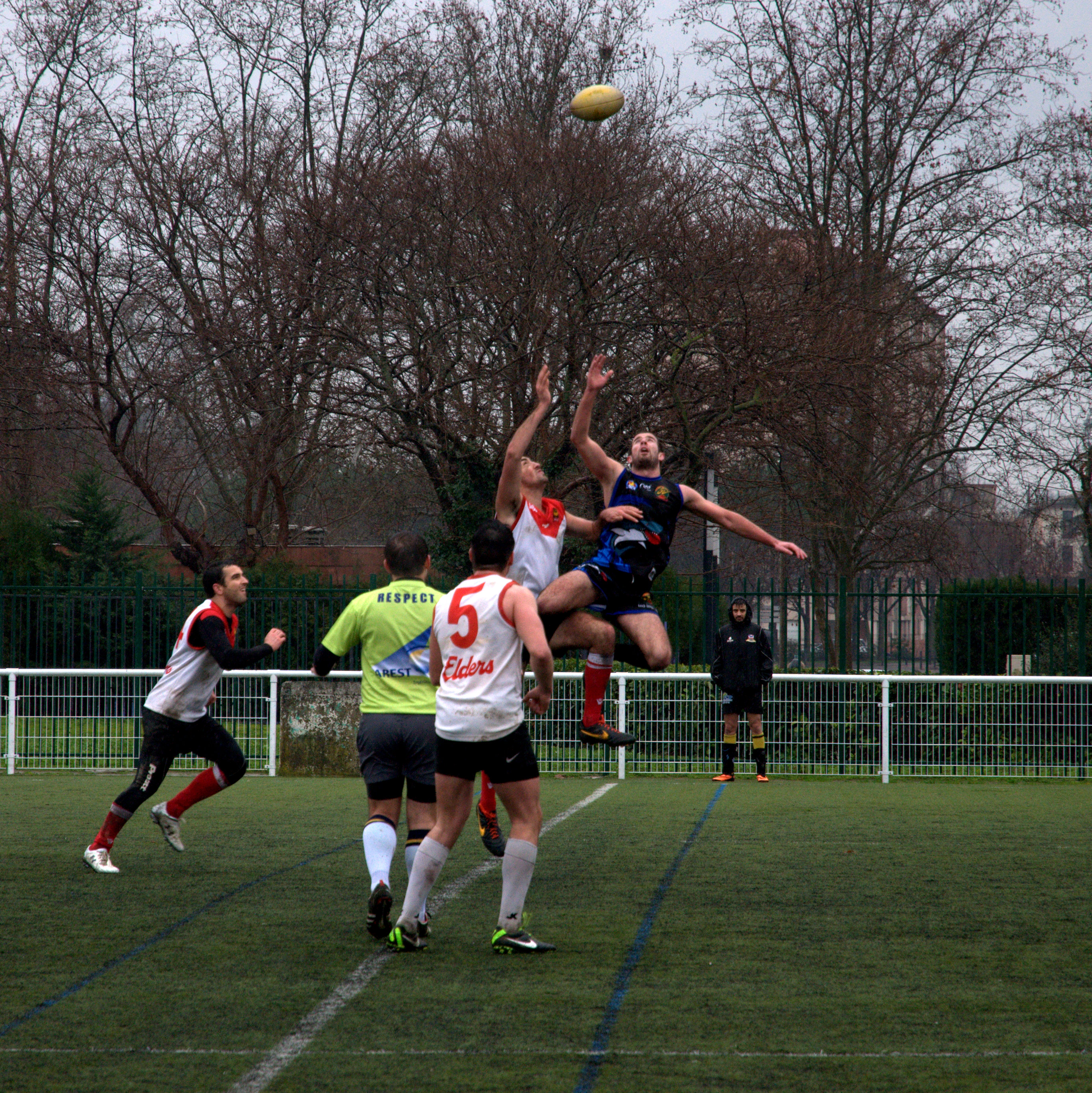
Action from a match in Toulouse, France in 2014

Australian Football is played in Europe at an amateur level in a large number of countries. The oldest and largest leagues are those in the United Kingdom, Ireland and Denmark, in each of these nations there are several established clubs, and organised men's, women's and juniors programs. The British AFL has now expanded into Welsh, Scottish and English leagues. The Danish AFL has been responsible for the expansion of Australian Football into Sweden, Finland, Iceland and Norway. The governing body for Australian Football in Europe was founded in Frankfurt in January 2010; the body was initially called the European Australian Football Association, but changed its name to AFL Europe at a general assembly meeting in Milan in October of the same year. It currently has 22 member nations. AFL Europe, with backing of the AFL in Australia has overseen a large improvement in the organisation of Australian football in Europe.

The sport has grown from a few clubs and leagues started mainly by expatriate Australians and returning nationals in the late 1980s and early 1990s, to now, having established leagues in almost 15 nations, with the majority of players being non-Australian.

As of the 2017 edition of the tournament, Ireland, Denmark, the United Kingdom, Spain, Sweden, France, Germany, Croatia and Finland have sent national teams to the Australian Football International Cup.

The two main cup competitions played between nations in Europe are the 18-a-side (formerly 16-a-side) European Championships in Australian Football and the nine-a-side Euro Cup. Both competitions strictly only allow local players to represent their country.

As of 2018 AFL Europe also organises the Fitzpatrick Cup, AFL Europe Champions League and ANZAC Cup on an annual basis.

Cup competitions held in the past have included the Atlantic Alliance Cup and Central European Australian Football League Championships. In addition, there are tests matches played between Great Britain and Ireland, a tri-series (European Australian Football Tri-nations Tournament) between Germany, Denmark and Sweden, and a tri-series between Croatia, Austria and the Czech Republic.

== Austria ==
Australian rules football in Austria has been played since 2004, when the nation's first club was founded in Vienna. The club began life as the Vienna Dingos, changing their name to the Vienna Kangaroos in 2006. In the same year and doubling as the National Team, the Kangaroos competed in a tri-nations series against Croatia and the Czech Republic. The Kangaroos eventually folded, and in 2018 a new football team called the Vienna Galahs was created by two ex-kangaroos members.

A second club was formed in Graz in 2008, named the Styrian DownUnderDogs. The first game between the two Austrian clubs was played on 25 October 2008 in Zwaring, Styria. The first Austrian premiership series was contested between the two teams in 2010, with Vienna winning the series 3–2.

The Austrian national team was considering attending the 2011 Australian Football International Cup, but later set a debut at the 2014 tournament as a more realistic goal.

In 2013, the first game between the two clubs in three years was held, which the Styrian DownUnderDogs won with 74:59. Furthermore, the national team of Austria, renamed to the Austrian Avalanches, made it to end 9th (Plate Champion) out of 12 teams at the EU-Cup in Bordeaux.

The Vienna Galahs and Styrian DownUnderDogs now compete in the 'Empire Cup', a competition that involves the Galahs, the DownUnderDogs, the Budapest Bats, the Prague Dragons, Fort Nysa and the Silesia Miners. In 2022 the Galahs defeated the DownUnderDogs 102-18 in a dominant performance.

The championship win meant that the Vienna Galahs qualified for the European Cup in 2023, held in Paris, France. Whilst they did not get a win, they were embraced by all teams and affectionately known as 'the pink'. The Galahs also travelled to Israel in 2023 to form the majority of a European Australian representative side to play in an ANZAC day memorial match. They played in a tournament against two Israeli teams and a UAE Australian representative side.

In 2023, the Empire Cup final was to be between Prague and Vienna, with Prague unable to attend and therefore forfeiting the match. The same year, Vienna won the Nysa Cup in Poland after their third year of attending.

As of 2023, The vienna Galahs has both a men's and women's team and is working towards building women's football with surrounding clubs.

=== Clubs ===
Active club

Team	Location	Founded	Notes
Vienna Galahs	Vienna	2004	Facebook page
Styrian DownUnderDogs	Graz	2008	Facebook page

== Belgium ==
Australian rules football was first played in Chatelet in 1919 by Australian soldiers in World War I.

Australian rules football has been played in Belgium since 2004, with a team based in Brussels. The Brussels Saints have played matches against the Paris Cockerels and teams from around Europe, including winning the 2005 EU Cup, although since this era, the club has gone into recess and is not currently active.

A new Belgian club played matches against Dutch sides Amsterdam and The Hague in late 2012, the first Australian rules football match played by a Belgian team in over five years. The local Brussels competition became known as the Belgium AFL.

=== Clubs ===
Active club

Team	Location	Founded	Notes
AFL Belgium	Brussels	2012	Facebook page

== Bulgaria ==
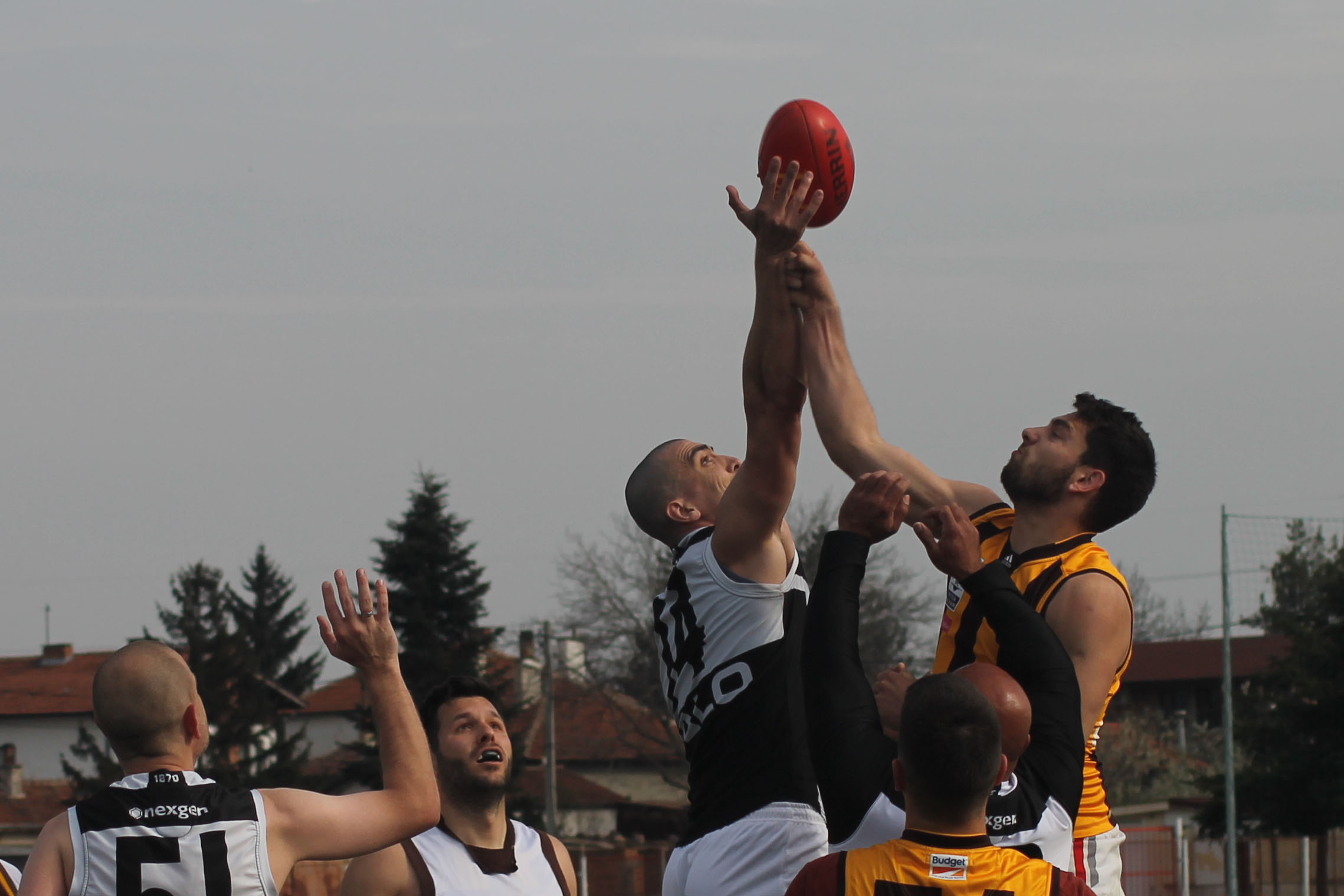
Action from the first interclub match in Bulgaria in 2019

There are currently two Australian rules football clubs in Bulgaria, the Varna Demons and the Sofia Magpies. A former club is the Burgas Hawks. AFL Bulgaria is the main governing body and competition for the sport in Bulgaria.

=== Clubs ===
Active club

Team	Location	Founded	Notes
Sofia Magpies	Sofia	2018	Facebook page
Varna Demons	Varna	2020	Facebook page
Burgas Hawks	Burgas	2021	Facebook page

== Croatia ==
In Croatia there are more than 100 players including both men's and women's teams from Zagreb, Velika Gorica and Ploče. The governing body is AFL Croatia. The national team "Croatian Knights". has been very successful.

=== History ===
Australian rules football in Croatia began with the first official team, known as the Zagreb Giants, in January 2006, although there had been efforts for many years before this to found a team in Zagreb.

In 2006, the team began a tri-nations series against the Czech Republic and Austria, winning the first event. In late 2006 plans were laid for a new team in Rijeka called the Sharks, although these did not come to fruition.

The Zagreb Giants formed an alliance with Australian Football League club the Hawthorn Hawks, changing their name to the Zagreb Hawks. Croatia's second club was created in 2008 under the name Kapitol Saints, with a series of domestic matches played between the Saints and the Hawks. This series has continued in 2009, with the Saints changing their name to the Agram Power, Agram being an old name for the city of Zagreb.

In 2010, the Velika Gorica Bombers became the third club founded in Croatia, based in the little town of Velika Gorica near Zagreb. They won the Croatian national league (HLAN) in 2011. They were followed in 2012 by the nation's fourth club, in the Zagreb city district of Zapruđe. They formed an alliance with AFL club GWS Giants, taking on the name Zapruđe Giants. In 2013 the Slavonski Brod Tigers joined the league and the league started construction of their home ground at the University of Zagreb.

Croatia is one of the stronger International teams, having come 1st (2010), 2nd (2008 and 2011) and 3rd (2009) in the four previous EU Cups. Croatia ended on 5th place on first European championship in Malmo and Copenhagen in 2010. The 2009 EU Cup was hosted by the Croatian Knights, in the town of Samobor, 25 km from Zagreb.

In 2014 there are four clubs playing out of Zagreb, the Zagreb Dockers, Zagreb Giants, Zagreb Hawks and the Zagreb Dragons. Also there is a new team playing in Slavonski Brod roughly 200 km from Zagreb. Almost all of the Zagreb players have/had a connection with the Zagreb University which maintains their oval. So do the Styrian Downunder Dogs from the university town of Graz in Austria who also play in the Croatian Australian Football League.

In 2015 a women's team from Velika Gorica was created. In 2016 there are five clubs from Zagreb and a sixth team from the Dalmatian coast at Ploče and a men's team from Velika Gorica. Croatian Knights won first place in EU cup 2016 while women's national team Queens won third place.

In 2016 Ploce Eagles and Zagreb Barbarians played an exhibition match in Zupa, Kupari.

Croatia sent a men's team to the 2017 Australian Football International Cup, its campaign was successful, winning Division 2 of the competition on debut.

In 2021, a dedicated ground in Zagreb was opened, one of the first such facilities in continental Europe. The ground was announced to host the 2022 AFL Europe Championship. Croatia placed 4th in the championship in both 2019 and 2022.

=== Clubs ===
Active club

Team	Location	Founded	Notes
Zagreb Hawks	Zagreb	2006	Facebook page (Originally known as the Giants)
Kapitol Saints	Zagreb	2008	Defunct
Velika Gorica Bombers	Velika Gorica	2010	Facebook page
Zaprude Giants	Zagreb	2012	Facebook page
Slavonski Brod Tigers	Zagreb	2014	
Zagreb Cvjento Dockers	Zagreb	2014	Facebook page
Sesvete Double Blues	Zagreb	2015	Facebook page
Ploce Eagles	Ploče	2016	Facebook page
Velica Gorica Mambas (women's)	Velika Gorica	2015	Facebook page
Zagreb Panthers (women's)	Zagreb	2016	Facebook page
Sesvete Redlegs (women's)	Zagreb	2018	Facebook page

=== Players ===
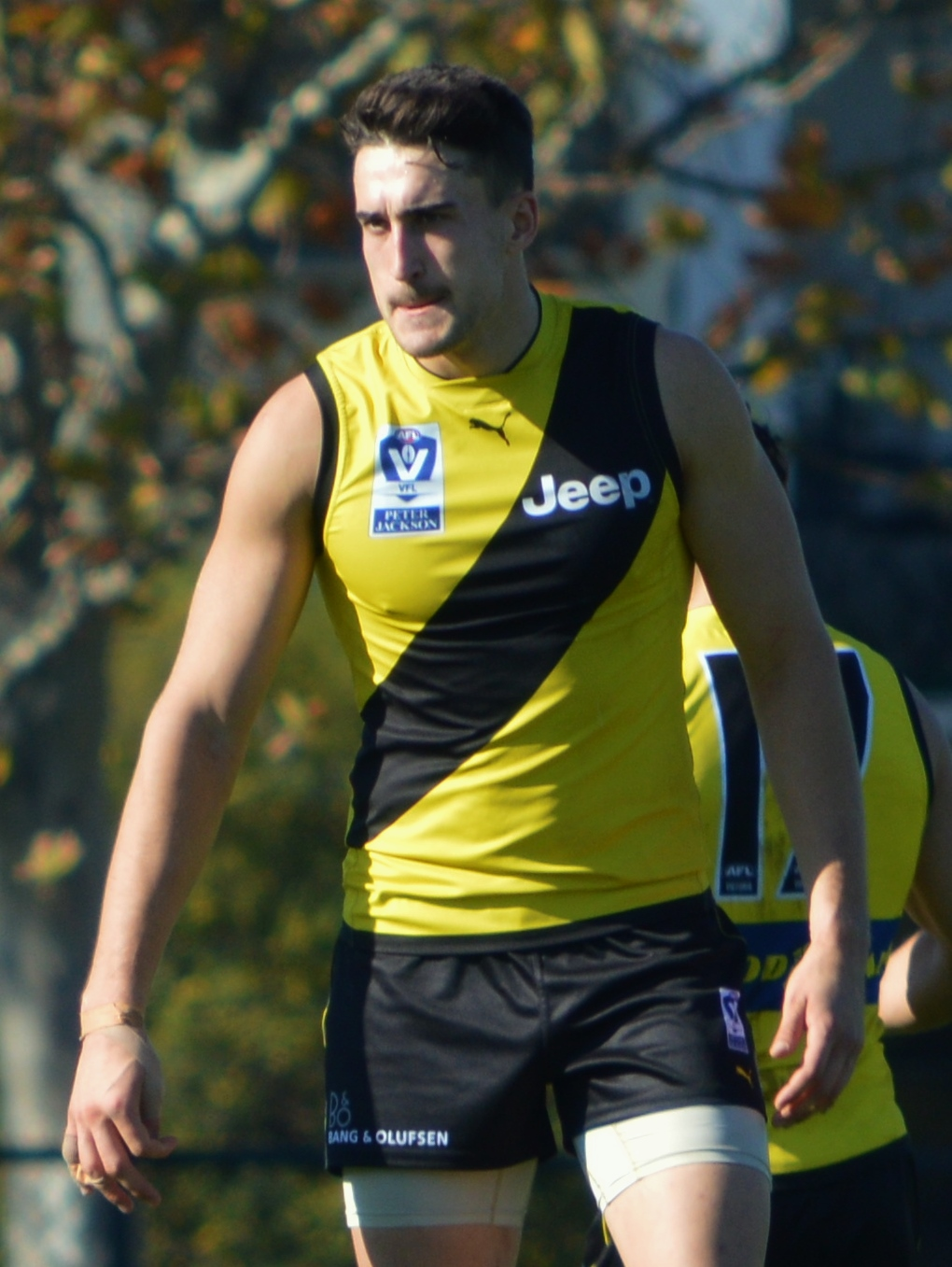
Ivan Soldo playing for Richmond in 2018

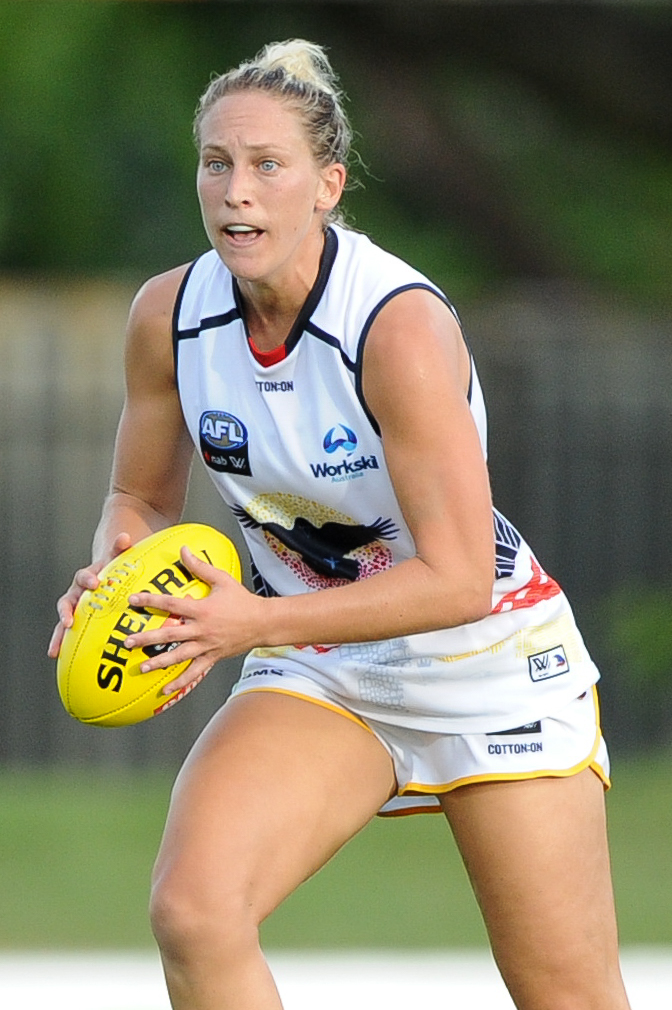
Marijana Rajcic playing for Adelaide in 2018

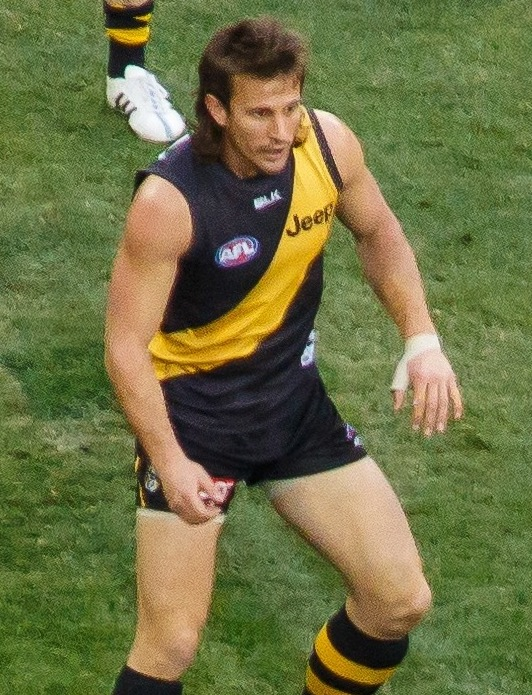
Ivan Maric playing for Richmond in 2015

Currently on an AFL or AFLW senior list

Player	Club/s	AFL/AFLW Years*	AFL/AFLW Matches*	AFL/AFLW Goals*	Connections to Croatia, References
Marijana Rajcic	Adelaide	2018-2022	50	2	Parent
Ivan Soldo	Richmond, Port Adelaide	2015-	63	27	Parent
Ivan Maric	Adelaide, Richmond	2005-2017	157	61	
Val Perovic	St Kilda, Carlton	1973-1985	175	13	Born Zadar

== Czech Republic ==
Australian rules football has been played in the Czech Republic since around 2003, when there were efforts to start a club in Prague known as the Tigers.

The first lasting club was founded in 2005, known as the Czech Lions. The Lions remained the only team in the Czech Republic for the next three years, playing mainly in tournaments against other European teams, hosting the CEAFL Championships in 2006.

The Czech AFL hosted the EU Cup in Prague in 2008, hosted at Slavia Rugby Club.

In 2009, the Czech AFL took steps to create a domestic competition in the Czech Republic, with the creation of two sides known as the All-Stars and the Marauders. As of July 2009, the two sides had around 30 active playing members, of which around one half were Czechs, one third expatriate Australians, and the remainder from other nationalities. The national representative side of the Czech AFL still competes under the name Czech Lions.

For the 2010 season, CAFL has expanded to four teams. The All Stars have been re-branded as the Vinohrady Hawks, the Marauders are now the Prague Cats and two new teams Prague Dragons and Prague Kings have been created. As well as significantly expanding the local league, The National team, The Czech Lions will be playing more international games this year. Making 2010 a significant year of expansion for C.A.F.L.

Along with these changes C.A.F.L. games are now played at the Sparta Rugby Field a new facility in Prague.

For the 2011 Season, CAFL has been re-branded as CAAFL (Czech Association of Australian Football) to comply with member ship requirements of the Czech Sports League. This is part of a long-term plan to have Australian Football recognized as an official sport in The Czech Republic.

The Czech Lions now have an official "Home" ground, the Petrovice Rugby Club in Petrovice-Prague.

In 2012 CAAFL the Czech Lions expanded their international activities by participating in more European football matches, starting with Berlin in April 2012. 2012 looked to be a turning point for Czech Football, with more Czech than non-Czech players involved in the sport leading to a strong National team.

2013 saw the CAFL expand to five teams, with the successful addition of a side from Dresden, the Dresden Wolves in Germany.

=== Clubs ===
Active club

Team	Location	Founded	Notes
Prague Tigers		2003	Defunct
Czech Lions		2005	(Now the national team)
Vinohrady Hawks (formerly All-Stars)	Prague	2009	Facebook page
Prague Cats (formerly Marauders)	Prague	2009	
Prague Kings	Prague	2010	Defunct
Prague Dragons	Prague	2010	Facebook page

== Denmark ==
Australian rules football in Denmark is governed by the Danish Australian Football League (DAFL). The league has grown to over 300 senior players and has one of the most successful junior programs outside Australia with a few hundred young players playing regular club football annually. The DAFL is often considered the largest Australian rules football competition outside the English speaking world.

The national team, the Denmark Vikings, competed at the 2002 International Cup, finishing in fourth place. They withdrew in 2005 due to financial reasons, but returned for the 2008 event.

The large acceptance of Australian Football by Denmark has seen Australian Football spread to neighbours Sweden, Finland, Iceland and Norway.

== France ==
As of 2008, Australian rules football was played in France by four clubs in Strasbourg, Paris, Montpellier and Bordeaux, with the Paris Cockerels winning the inaugural national club championship tournament that year.

The national league commenced on 28 March 2009 with those four clubs, although new sides are also under formation in Perpignan, Toulouse and Aix en Provence. The newly formed Perpignan Tigers will compete in the Catalan league in 2009.

The France national team has competed at the EU Cup, and made their Australian Football International Cup debut in 2011.

In 2013 there are six clubs that play in the national super league and compete for the Coup de France and three clubs that play in the developmental league and play for the Coup de Sud.

As of the 2016/2017 season, there are 8 teams competing in the national league. These teams are based in Paris (two teams), Bordeaux, Toulouse, Perpignan, Blagnac, Cergy-Pontoise and Lyon. As of 2017 there are also teams in Strasbourg, Lille, Antony, Montpellier and Bayonne that are in the process of formation.

== Finland ==
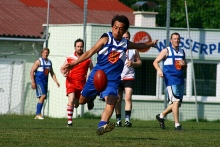
Action from a CEAFL match between Austria and Finland in 2007

Australian rules football in Finland is controlled by the Finland AFL, who formed in 2006 after the creation of Finland's first Australian football club around a year earlier. Domestic matches began in 2007 with two teams, the Helsinki Heatseekers and Salo Juggernauts. A third team, the Espoo Roos was created in 2008.

In 2009, the Finland AFL saw a three team domestic competition kick off (as the Espoo Roos combined with the Helsinki heatseekers), with the creation of the Turku Dockers. The Finland AFL hopes to have a team from Tampere or other larger cities to commence in future with a team being developed in Vaasa.

2010 saw three teams once again battle out for the season, with the once powerhouse Helsinki going winless for the year, the grand final was played between Salo and 2009 winners, Turku. Once again, Turku was too strong for its opposition on the day and ran out comfortable winners 19.17 131 to 8.4 52.

The Finland Icebreakers are the representative Australian rules football team of Finland, formerly known as the Finnish Lions. They have twice won the Central European AFL Championships, going back-to-back in 2006 and 2007. While the team was started by Australian expatriates, it has been captained by a Finn ever since the 2nd match with different captains including Kimmo Heikkilä, Jani Saarinen, Fredi Romar and Ville Voivunen. The Icebreakers are now almost exclusively Finns.

The Icebreakers have appeared at the EU Cup in 2007, 2008 and 2009 as well as making their first trip to Australian for the 2008 Australian Football International Cup. Finland also appeared in the first ever 16 a side tournament held in copenhagen and Malmö in 2010.

=== Clubs ===
Active club

Team	Location	Founded	Premierships	Notes
Helsinki Heatseekers	Helsinki	2007	7	Facebook page
Turku Dockers	Turku	2009	8	Website, Facebook page
Salo Juggernauts	Salo	2007		defunct
Waasa Wombats	Vaasa	2010	1	defunct

== Germany ==
Australian Football League Germany (AFL Germany) is the sports governing body for Australian Football in Germany.

The Australian Football League Germany plays a home-and-away season featuring clubs based in Berlin, Munich, Cologne, Frankfurt, Heidelberg, Kiel, Dresden Stuttgart and Hamburg. The official German national teams (the German Eagles) first appeared in the EU Cup 2005 in London and have since contested AFL Europe tournaments, continuing the presence through to the 2026 Euro Cup in Newcastle in July.

== Hungary ==
Hungary's first club, the Budapest Bats, was founded in June 2019. The club fields men's and women's teams in the Empire Cup against the Vienna Galahs, Styrian Downunderdogs, Prague Dragons and Fort Nysa.

Hungary's second club, the Kőbánya Crows, based in southern Budapest, was founded in late 2023.

The Hungarian national team played its first games against Croatia and Israel in Gyömrő in May 2024

=== Clubs ===
Active club

Team	Location	Founded	Notes
Budapest Bats	Budapest	2019	Facebook page
Kőbánya Crows	Budapest	2023	

=== Players ===
Currently on an AFL or AFLW senior list

Player	Club/s	AFL/AFLW Years*	AFL/AFLW Matches*	AFL/AFLW Goals*	Connections to Hungary, References
Patrick Veszpremi	Sydney Swans Western Bulldogs	2008-2013	23	17	Heritage
Lauren Szigeti	Sydney	2022-2024	20	0	Heritage

== Ireland ==
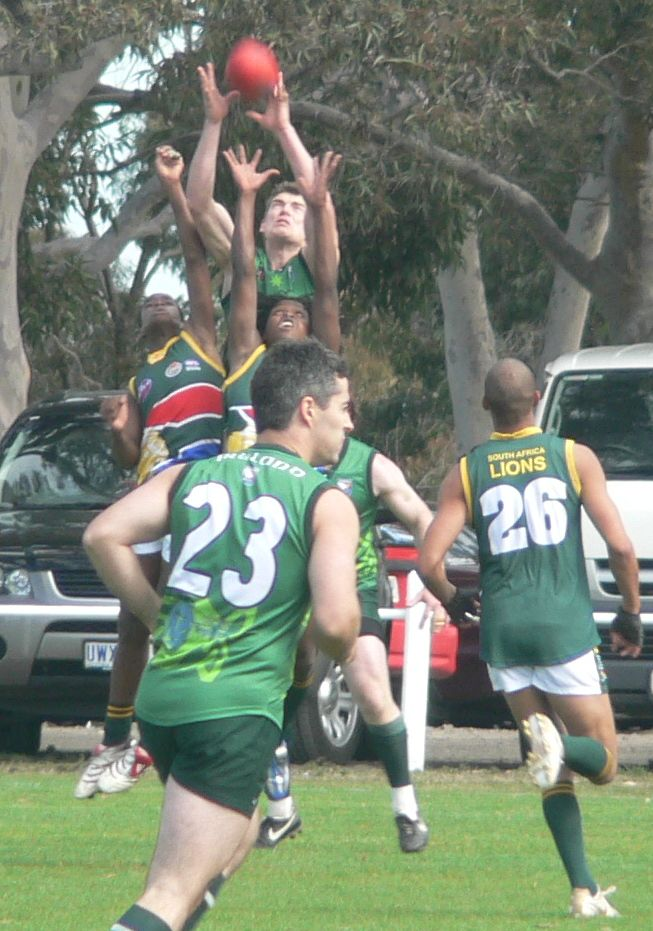
Ireland's All-International Mike Finn takes a mark over a pack of South African opponents in the 2008 AFL International Cup

Australian rules football is a fairly recently introduced team sport in Ireland but the country has a long history of interaction with Australian rules leagues. There has been some awareness of Australian rules football in Ireland since the first International rules football tests took place in late 1967.

Since 1982, the Irish experiment has seen Irish players becoming professional Australian rules footballers in the Australian Football League. High-profile players include Jim Stynes, Tadhg Kennelly and Zach Tuohy among others. As GAA sports are primarily amateur competition and the AFL competition is professional, there is a strong financial lure.

Despite Irish players being recruited to the AFL, Aussie Rules was not officially played in Ireland until clubs were formed in Dublin and Belfast in 1999.

The Australian Rules Football League of Ireland was formed in October 2000.

The Irish national Australian rules football team, first appeared at the Atlantic Alliance Cup in 2001, going through the tournament undefeated. Their berth in the Grand Final created a small amount of interest in the Irish media. They then went on to win the 2002 Australian Football International Cup, and have since remained in the top four, despite not having kept the pace with other emerging nations.

The International Rules Series between the AFL and GAA generated a high amount of media interest in Ireland, although this is more due to the similarity between International rules football and Gaelic football than anything related to Aussie Rules. In terms of Australian rules football, the media has covered with interest the successful recruits of the Australian Football League. Television coverage of the sport has grown in Ireland and highlights and game packages are now regularly shown on the ESPN channel through British Sky Broadcasting and cable television operator UPC Ireland.

== Netherlands ==
Australian rules football was first played in the Netherlands around 2003, with the creation of the Dutch Australian Football Association (DAFA). This organisation later disappeared but was re-formed in 2007. There was still no formal team or league in the Netherlands, but by late 2006 some steps had been taken with a group training and playing regularly in The Hague and the national team being nicknamed the Flying Dutchmen (de Vliegende Hollanders). 2009 saw the successful establishment of a four team league.

2009 saw the beginning of rapid growth for the DAFA, with 6 scheduled home and away international games, plus plans for the establishment of 4 domestic teams, in Utrecht, The Hague, Eindhoven and Amsterdam. The first domestic match played in the Netherlands was a friendly between the newly formed Utrecht Saints and the Rest of the Netherlands played on 9 May in Utrecht. Training sessions are held weekly in various locations around the country.

In 2016 DAFA was renamed to AFL Netherlands. In 2018 two new clubs were founded: the Waterland Eagles from Purmerend and the Delft Blues. With the Amsterdam Devils, the domestic league consists of three teams since 2019.

=== Hosted international events ===
Since 2013, AFL Netherlands hosts the DIC (Dutch International Cup), an invitational tournament for club teams from all over Europe. Since 2015, AFL Netherlands annually hosts the AFL Europe Champions League - which features the winners of European domestic competitions - in Amsterdam.

=== Domestic grounds ===
In 2008, the DAFA partnered with the Amsterdamse Cricket & Hockeyclub Veni Vidi Vici (A.C. & H.C VVV or simply VVV) to establish a home ground for Australian Football in The Netherlands. While games have been played in both Utrecht and The Hague, most games are played at the VVV. In August 2012, permanent goal posts were erected, believed to be only the second permanent set of goal posts in Europe. Since 2014 the Amsterdam Devils train and play their home matches at Sportpark de Eendracht in Amsterdam West, which is also the home of the Dutch National Rugby team.

=== National team ===
Netherlands
- Nickname(s): Flying Dutchmen
- Governing body: AFL Europe

International Cup
- Appearances: 0

The Netherlands National Australian Football Team, The Flying Dutchmen, compete regularly in international friendlies, and participate in the annual Eurocup tournament. In 2013 and 2014 they also competed in the Algarve Cup in Portugal, winning the tournament in 2013.

EuroCup Results:

2005, London, England: Third place

2006: No competition held.

2007, Hamburg, Germany: Tenth Place In the 2007 EU Cup the Flying Dutchmen finished 10th, losing to Belgium in the plate final.

2008, Prague, Czech Republic: Ninth Place (Bowl Champions) In 2008 the Flying Dutchmen established a home ground in Amstelveen, near Amsterdam and fielded a team in the 2008 EU Cup in Prague, finishing as bowl champions in 9th place overall.

2009, Zagreb, Croatia: Runners-up At the 2009 EU Cup held in Zagreb, Croatia, The Flying Dutchmen surprised the other 14 competing teams by finishing as Runner-up, losing to England in the Grand Final.

2010, Milan, Italy: Runners-up At the 2010 EuroCup tournament, The Flying Dutchmen again made the Grand Final, defeating England in the semi but losing to Croatia in the Final.

2011, Belfast, Northern Ireland: Fifteenth Place

2012, Edinburgh, Scotland: Did not participate

2013, Bordeaux, France: Did not participate

2014, London, England: Fifteenth Place

For the first time fielding a fully Dutch squad, the Flying Dutchmen did not progress from a tough group with Italy, Germany and France. Despite several injuries, the Dutch improved throughout the day and ended their tournament on a high by winning their final match of the day.

2015, Umag, Croatia: Ninth Place (Winners of the Plate Division)

2016, Lisbon, Portugal: Ninth Place (Winners of the Plate Division)

After a narrow loss against the Crusaders and a hard-fought loss against England in the group stage, Italy and Austria were beaten so that the Plate, belonging to the ninth place, was kept in The Netherlands.

2017, Bordeaux, France: Sixth Place

After a win against Scotland and a loss against Ireland in the group stage, the Flying Dutchmen proceeded to the quarter-finals in which they lost against France. After a win against Austria, the final for the 5th place was lost against Wales.

2018, Cork, Ireland: Sixth Place

In the group stage the Flying Dutchmen defeated Tel Aviv and were defeated by Croatia, resulting in a 2nd place in the group and therefore progression to the quarter-finals. The quarter finals game was lost against the later cup winner Denmark. After a win against Scotland, the Dutchmen played the final for the 5th place against France which was lost, resulting in a 6th place that equaled the previous year's result.

=== Players ===
Currently on an AFL senior list

Player	Club/s	AFL Years*	AFL Matches*	AFL Goals*	Connections to Netherlands, References
Robbert Klomp	Carlton, Footscray	1979-1984	93	20	Born Heerenveen
Wennie Van Lint	Sydney	1967	2	0	Born Haarlem
Eddie Melai	South Melbourne	1964	7	2	Born
Ron Van T'Hag	Geelong	1959	2	0	Born Almelo

== Poland ==
AFL Poland (Polish: AFL Polska) is the governing body of Australian rules football in Poland, and oversees the operations of Poland's national league and the Polish men's and women's national teams.

The Polish Australian Football League (Polish: Polska Liga Futbolu Australijski), also simply known as the Liga Polska in Polish, began in 2022. Polish clubs have also participated in friendly matches and matches with clubs from other European countries, namely Austria, the Czech Republic, Germany and Hungary.

=== 2023 results ===
2023 Liga Polska season ladder
Pos	Club	W	L	D	Pts
1	Fort Nysa	4	2	0	16
2	Wrocław Lions	4	2	0	16
3	Silesia Miners	2	4	0	8
4	Warsaw Bison	2	4	0	8

== Sweden ==
Australian rules football started in Sweden with the creation of a club nicknamed the Saints in the southern city of Helsingborg to play in the Danish AFL. For the next decade, Scania was the only area in Sweden where the sport was played, clubs in Gothenburg and Stockholm being created in the early 21st century. Scania, Gothenburg and Stockholm remain the three largest centers for the sport in Sweden, although clubs have also been created in Falun, Karlstad and most recently Uppsala in 2007 by Australian and other Students studying at Uppsala University.

The Swedish national team, the Elks, have become increasingly competitive in the last few years and appeared at the 2008 Australian Football International Cup.

The game of Australian rules football has grown steadily in Stockholm over the past few years with a marked increase in local Swedish players.

As of 2012 there are 6 established clubs in the Stockholm Region with over 20 players registered at each club. Södermalm Blues, Årsta Swans, Bromma Vikings, Solna Axemen, Falun Diggers and the newly formed Norrtälje Dockers, established in February 2012. The Stockholm Region is governed by The SAFF (Stockholm Region Australian Rules Football Federation) and its regional team are The Stockholm Dynamites.

Stockholm will host the 2012 Swedish Cup which sees all teams from Sweden competing in a 9 a side round robin tournament to determine Sweden's best Australian Rules Football Team.

== Switzerland ==
A team from the Swiss border city Lugano began participating in the AFL Italia league in 2010. From this team developed a Swiss National Team who competed in the 2010 Euro Cup hosted by AFL Italia in Parabiago, Milano, Italy on 2 October 2010.

Switzerland were defeated by England and Germany in the first two rounds, then in the third round defeated the Czech Republic. The Semi-finals for their Pool saw them compete against Scotland, who proved far too experienced for the young Swiss team, and later went on to finish 4th overall. The Swiss national team finished 11th out of the 15 Nations competing.

A women's team competed in the 2011 Euro Cup in Belfast, Northern Ireland.

Neither the men's nor the women's teams from Lugano competed in the Euro cup for a second time and an attempt by the men's team to enter the International Cup in Melbourne in 2011 failed due to a lack of funding. After the founders moved back to Italy, footy in Switzerland soon came to a halt.

In August 2016, a group of amateurs started holding footy training sessions in Winterthur. This continued through 2017 and culminated in sending a team of inexperienced Swiss nationals to the 2017 Euro Cup in Bordeaux. Switzerland finished 14th of 14 nations that competed.

In February 2018, the Winterthur Lions AFC was officially founded. The Lions competed in The Champions League in Amsterdam in April 2018 and in a CEAFL tournament in Prague in September 2018. A 7-v-7 exhibition match in Winterthur in August 2018 helped increase interest and awareness of Australian Rules football in Switzerland. Two new Clubs, the Basel Dragons and the Geneva Jets, were founded in October 2018.

Switzerland's men's team competed in the Euro Cup in Cork in October 2018.

A new Swiss league, AFL Switzerland, had its inaugural season between May and September 2019.

== United Kingdom ==
The Oxford University Australian Rules Football Club is the oldest Australian Rules Football Club outside of Australia. Inaugurated by a group of expatriates studying at the universities of Oxford and Cambridge after World War I, the Oxford-Cambridge Varsity match is one of the oldest varsity matches. Both teams compete in the National University League (NUL), joined by the University of Birmingham and Cardiff Metropolitan University, in which both women's and men's teams play.

There are a number of leagues operating throughout the United Kingdom, affiliated with the AFL Britain. The Great Britain Bulldogs are the representative team for the whole of Great Britain, although the England Dragonslayers, Scottish Puffins and Welsh Red Dragons have also competed on occasions. Northern Ireland is represented through the Irish national team.

=== England ===
The sport in England dates back to the 1880s. Local competition has grown since 1989 to several amateur leagues.

=== Northern Ireland ===
The only club from Northern Ireland to date are the Belfast Redbacks. The Redbacks were part of the Australian Rules Football League of Ireland and are the ARLI (all Ireland) 2012 premiers. They have contributed players to the Irish national team.

=== Scotland ===
Australian rules football is currently played by five clubs in Scotland, with the Glasgow Sharks, Edinburgh Bloods, Falkirk Silverbacks, Kingdom Kangaroos and the Glasgow Giants forming the Scottish Australian Rules Football League.

While the current SARFL has only been in existence since 2002, there are stories of a league existing in Scotland prior to the First World War, referred to by Geoffrey Blainey in A Game of their Own, although other historians have claimed that this is probably apocryphal.

Scots living in Melbourne and Victoria in the mid-19th century were greatly involved in the formation of the rules of the game, as well as the formation of a number of early clubs, including the still-existing Essendon Bombers.

The Scottish national representative team is known as The Clansmen.

=== Wales ===
Australian rules football began in Wales with the formation of Aussie Rules Wales (ARW) on 1 September 2006, associated with Aussie Rules International. The Welsh league later went their own way, rebranding as the Welsh Australian Rules Football League (WARFL).

The first Welsh premiership season was conducted in 2007, with an affiliation with the South Australian National Football League. The four Welsh senior sides in the South Cardiff Panthers, Cardiff Double Blues, Newport Tigers and Swansea Magpies wear the guernseys of South Adelaide, Sturt, Glenelg and Port Adelaide respectively.

Aussie Rules Wales was renamed the Welsh Australian Rules Football League for the 2008 season.

The national Welsh team is known as the Wales Red Dragons, with their first appearance against the England Dragonslayers which was played in Cardiff on 3 November 2007 with England defeating Wales 61–91. Welsh representatives Ed Doe and David James became the first Welsh members of the Great Britain Bulldogs at the 2008 Australian Football International Cup. The WARFL Red Devils are a second representative side of the league, featuring the best players of any nationality.

== Inactive nations ==
Below are nations which have either had a domestic or international presence, but as of 2023 have not played the sport for over two years.

=== Andorra ===
The Australian rules football club of Andorra formed in early 2008, with plans to compete in the Catalan AFL. Logistical problems saw them withdraw from the league before the first round.

Andorra made its first appearance at the WAFF (World Australian Football Federation) World 9s in September 2008, which was played in Valls, Catalonia. The first ever international goal for the Andorran team was kicked by Sumra Sallis and the team went on to defeat Spain in their first international match. Andorra finished equal third in the competition which included teams from Senegal, Catalonia, Argentina, France and Spain. France went on to win the final which was played against Catalonia.

In 2009 the Corbs d'Andorra (which they translate as "Andorra Crows") made their debut in the Catalan AFL.

=== Lithuania ===
Australian rules football in Lithuania was first played in 2009, with the creation of a club in Vilnius, the Vilnius Iron Wolves, in 2009 by a French fan of the sport. There are efforts to expand the game in Lithuania.

=== Iceland ===
Australian rules football has been played in Iceland since 20 May 2009, when Friðgeir Torfi Ásgeirsson, who had played in the Danish Australian Football League, rounded up friends in a local park to kick some footy. Before the first club was founded in Iceland, a national team, known as the Icelandic Ravens, was assembled for the 2009 EU Cup. The first teams were founded in April 2010 and are known as the Dragons, the Eagles and the Bulls. The team names come from Iceland's coat of arms. The 3 teams play in a 9-a-side league and finished their inaugural season on 18 May 2010 with the Bulls as the first premiers of the IceAFL (Icelandic Australian Football League).

=== Italy ===
Australian rules football in Italy was first played in 2004 with an attempt to start a league based around the city of Naples, under the name Federazione Italiana di Football Australiano (FItAF). Four teams in Salerno, Naples, San Giorgio a Cremano and Barra were created, but the league ultimately did not get off the ground.

A new group started playing under the name AFL Italia in Milan in July 2009, who created the first national league in Italy in 2010, with the Rome Blues, Genoa Dockers, Milan Aussie Rulers and Lugano Steinbocks.

A friendly match between Rome and Milan in June 2010 became the first match played in Rome. The new league which also includes teams from Genoa and cross Switzerland border city Lugano was supported by prominent Australians Tim Fischer and Amanda Vanstone.

The 2010 AFL Italia premiership was won by the Rome Blues, who defeated Milan in the Grand Final, held in Rome.

=== Italian community in Australia ===
A large number of Italian Australians have played professionally in the Australian Football League, including Ron Barassi, Sergio Silvagni, Stephen Silvagni, Robert DiPierdomenico, Saverio Rocca and Peter Matera.

In recognition of the contribution made to the sport of Australian rules throughout its history by players of Italian background, the VFL/AFL Italian Team of the Century was named in June 2007.

A team representing the Melbourne Italian community also competed at the Australian Football Multicultural Cup in 2005.

=== Norway ===
The Oslo Trolls formed in 2005 as Norway's first Australian rules football club, but didn't play their first match until hosting the Karlstad Dragons from Sweden in August 2008. Prior to this, players from the Trolls had travelled to western Sweden to play in club matches with the teams in Karlstad and Gothenburg.

The second club to form in the Oslo area were founded in early 2009 in the town of Ås. This club is nicknamed the Ås Battlers, after the Australian expression Aussie battler, due to the name of the town sounding similar to the first syllable of Aussie. The Oslo Trolls and Ås Battlers played their first match against each other in August 2009.

In May 2009, a group started playing social matches in the northern city of Tromsø. This club is currently the most northerly Australian rules team in the world.

The Oslo Trolls changed their name to Oslo Crows in 2010, with an affiliation agreement with professional club the Adelaide Crows from the Australian Football League. In 2012 they split the team in Oslo East and Oslo West to make a 3 team cup with Ås. It was called Kenguru Cup (Norwegian for Kangaroo) and was played over 5 rounds where all teams met each other once in each round. (Similar to home and away season in AFL) The first winners of the Kenguru Cup was Oslo East.

==== National team ====
Norway
- Nickname(s): Polar Bears
- Governing body: AFL Europe

International Cup
- Appearances: 0

The Norway Polar Bears (Isbjørnene in Norwegian) made their first test match appearance against Sweden in Karlstad, Sweden on 3 October 2009. The side involved players from all three Australian football clubs in Norway, with around 50% local-born players, the Norway side defeating Sweden on the day.

With the Oslo club becoming known as the Crows, the Trolls name has since occasionally been used for the Norway national team.

Norway Trolls played in their first Euro Cup in 2012 and won the Plate final, finished at 13th place and received credit by a number of people who watched them play.

=== Russia ===
The first Australian rules football clubs in Russia were created in May 2011, with groups starting practice matches in Moscow and Krasnoyarsk within a few weeks of each other. Both fledgling clubs have been started by an expat Australian, but with the remainder of the playing group consisting of local Russians.

Russia competed at the 2011 AFL 9s Euro Cup in Belfast. In 2016 Russian national team took part in AFL Europe Cup in Lisbon.

=== Spain ===
Australian rules football in Spain is currently played in two regions, with an emerging local league in the Autonomous Community of Madrid and the LFAC in the region of Catalonia. Spain's national Australian rules football team is nicknamed the Bulls, their guernsey showing a Bull, a well known national symbol of Spain, in the national colours of red and yellow. Spain entered a team into the 2005 Australian Football International Cup, successfully raising the money to travel to Melbourne, Australia. The team failed to win a game and finished last, but was widely commended for its spirited performance. This team was drawn exclusively from players from the Madrid Bears and Spanish nationals resident in Melbourne, the Catalan league not taking part in the squad for various reasons.

Two separate sides from Spain appeared at the 2007 EU Cup, one drawn from Madrid under the banner of 'Spain' and another representing Catalonia.

==== Madrid ====
Australian rules was first played in Madrid at a social level in 1997. In 2003, the Madrid Bears club formed and quickly grew in player numbers. In a minor international championship in 2003 hosted by Spain and with Germany and England also involved, Spain defeated Germany in the final.

In October 2003 the Australian Convicts played their second match of their European tour against the Bears in Madrid, Spain.

The Bears' level of activity dropped off in the season following the 2005 International Cup, although the creation of a second team known as the Kangaroos in the town of Móstoles near Madrid and the commencement of a championship series between the Bears and Kangaroos has seen a resurgence in playing numbers.

==== Catalonia ====
Australian rules football in Catalonia is currently played by two teams in Barcelona and Valls organised as the Lliga de Futbol Australià de Catalunya (Catalan Australian Football League). The sport began in Catalonia in 2000, when a group of people begun to play in Valls. The LFAC was officially created in 2005, teams that have competed in this league include Belfry Valls, Barcelona Stars, Gabas Tarragona, Lleida Coiots, and Wendells Salou. Salou merged with Tarragona for the 2006 season, then in 2007 the teams from Lleida and Tarragona elected to withdraw from the league, hoping to rebuild.

A French team from Northern Catalonia, the Saint Esteve Saints, considered joining the LFAC for their 2007 season, but this club has since folded.

The Catalan team played at the 2005 EU Cup in London and also appeared at the EU Cup in 2007.

In 2008 the league kicked off the season with four teams; Belfry Valls, Cornella Bocs (previously the Barcelona Stars), Valls Fire and Picamuixons Birds. A team from Andorra had planned to compete, but were forced to withdraw due to problems with the stadium they had planned to use. The Andorrans competed in other matches outside the LFAC season.

In 2009, the league spread to cover teams from the Catalan regions of Andorra and France, with the inclusion of the Andorra Crows and the Perpignan Tigers.

== European performance at International Cup ==
Flag	Nation	Nickname	2002	2005	2008	2011	2014	2017
(Croatia)	Croatia	Knights	-	-	-	-	-	11th
(Denmark)	Denmark	Vikings	4th	-	11th	8th	-	-
(Finland)	Finland	Icebreakers	-	-	14th	-	15th	-
(France)	France	Coqs	-	-	-	14th	11th	10th
(Germany)	Germany	Eagles	-	-	-	-	-	12th
(United Kingdom)	Great Britain	Bulldogs	6th	6th	9th	7th	9th	6th
(Republic of Ireland)	Ireland	Warriors	1st	4th	4th	1st	2nd	3rd
(Spain)	Spain	Bulls	-	10th	-	-	-	-
(Sweden)	Sweden	Elks	-	-	12th	11th	13th	-
