= Israel national Australian rules football team =

Israel
- Nickname(s): Beasts
- Governing body: AFL Europe
- Head coach: Ido Shnitzer
- Captain: Shir Shalev
- Most caps: Shir Shalev (25)
- Top scorer: Eli Lipshatz (25)
- Home stadium: Yarkon Park, Tel Aviv

Rankings
- Current: Not ranked (as of October 2022)

Biggest win
- Israel 62 - 2 Switzerland, Euro Cup 2024

Biggest defeat
- Israel 2 - 59 Croatia, Euro Cup 2018

International Cup
- Appearances: 0

AFL Israel is the governing body for Australian rules football in Israel. The body manages the national team, The Israeli Beasts, as well as local teams that include the Tel Aviv Cheetahs. Israel competes in the European league governed by AFL Europe.

== Team Symbols ==
Official logo of the Israeli Beasts

Team's mascot is a mighty creature, caught in the middle of the game carrying the ball forward. The colours of the logo are traditional for Israel white and blue, with the classic Aussie rules red ball in one of his paws.

== Team history ==
The team was formed in May 2019 ahead of the AFL Euro Cup 2019 by the platform OddBalls and the management of the Tel Aviv Cheetahs football club.

The first practice took place on May 24 at the Rugby Field in Yarkon Park, Tel Aviv.

== Euro Cup Results ==
Since 2018, Israel has consistently participated in the European 9-a-side AFL competition known as the Euro Cup. Prior to 2018, teams that represented Israel that participated in European tournaments did not fall under the AFL Israel banner and were either Jewish players that chose to represent Israel in the tournament or an off-shoot of the AFL Peace Team, such as the Jerusalem Lions

=== Euro Cup 2018 ===
At the 2018 Euro Cup, Israel was represented under by the Tel Aviv Cheetah's, the first official team in the country. These results are recognized by AFL Israel as the first participation under the AFL Israel banner. The 2018 edition of the tournament was held in Cork, Ireland and featured 15 teams. At the tournament, the Tel Aviv Cheetahs lost all three of their group games, losing to Croatia by 57 ponts, the Netherlands by 15 points, and Wales by 18 points.

The Cheetahs would then record their first win against the Czech Republic to finish the tournament in 11th out of 15 participating teams.

Teams	Total
Tel Aviv Cheetahs	2
Croatia	59

Teams	Total
Tel Aviv Cheetahs	8
Netherlands	23

Teams	Total
Tel Aviv Cheetahs	12
Wales	30

Teams	Total
Tel Aviv Cheetahs	16
Czech Republic	10

=== Euro Cup 2019 ===
The 2019 Euro Cup was hosted in Norrtälje, Sweden, and was the first tournament were AFL Israel played under the Israel Beast's name. Israel was again one of the 16 teams competing at the tournament. During the tournament, they lost to the eventual winners, England, before suffering a second loss to the Nethernlands by 25 points. The Israelis then defeated Poland to register their biggest win in a major tournament, which stood until 2024. Israel then suffered a tough 7-point loss to Russia before finishing the tournament with wins over Austria and Finland.

Despite the positive end of the tournament, team Israel still finished lower in the rankings in 13th position overall out of 16 teams.

Teams	Total
Israel	9
England	43

Teams	Total
Israel	10
Nethernlands	35

Teams	Total
Israel	42
Poland	2

Teams	Total
Israel	21
Russia	28

Teams	Total
Israel	16
Austria	1

Teams	Total
Israel	42
Finland	7

=== Euro Cup 2020 and 2021 ===
Unfortunately, the 2020 and 2021 Euro Cup competitions were cancelled due to the COVID-19 pandemic. The tournaments were due to be held in Stirling, Scotland in 2020, and Amsterdam, Netherlands in 2021.

=== Euro Cup 2022 ===
The 2022 Euro Cup saw a return to international competition for the first time since the COVID-19 pandemic ground international travel to a standstill. The 2022 tournament was held in Edinburgh, Scotland and saw the tournament reduced to only 11 teams. At the tournament, the Israel team faced off against the Nethernlands for the third time in the tournament's history, coming away with a 41–13 victory for the first time against the team from the Netherlands. However, they lost their next game to England in a tight contest, before defeating Scotland 20–9.

Israel lost their remaining matches to Wales, by 3 points, and France, by 26 points, to finish the tournament in eighth place.

Teams	Total
Israel	41
Nethernlands	13

Teams	Total
Israel	8
England	21

Teams	Total
Israel	20
Scotland	9

Teams	Total
Israel	22
Wales	25

Teams	Total
Israel	9
France	35

=== Euro Cup 2023 ===
The 2023 Euro Cup tournament was held in the city of Kiel, Germany where Israel finished 9th out of out of 13 teams. Israel started the tournament with a losses to Sweden, Germany, and Wales, before defeating Northern Ireland. Israel would finish the tournament comprehensively defeating Nethernlands by 42-points, posting their highest ever score and eclipsing their previous win record that they set at the 2019 Euro Cup against Poland.

Teams	Total
Israel	10
Sweden	26

Teams	Total
Israel	11
Germany	33

Teams	Total
Israel	14
Wales	50

Teams	Total
Israel	32
Northern Ireland	7

Teams	Total
Israel	51
Nethernlands	9

=== Euro Cup 2024 ===
The 2024 Euro Cup was held in Kiel, Germany for the second year in a row and saw the tournament grow back to 13 teams for the first time since 2019. In the cup Israel was drawn into a group with reigning champions Ireland as well as Switzerland and Scotland. Israel lost the opening game of the tournament to Ireland by 10 points, before beating Switzerland and Scotland to finish their group in second place.

Israel then defeated Sweden in the first of the rankings play-offs before falling to France to finish the tournament as the 5th seed overall. This was Israel's best result in an international competition. Star player, Shir Maran, was also named to the team of the tournament after kicking 11 goals while predominantly playing through the midfield.

Teams	Total
Israel	18
Ireland	28

Teams	Total
Israel	62
Switzerland	2

Teams	Total
Israel	32
Scotland	27

Teams	Total
Israel	50
Sweden	25

Teams	Total
Israel	38
France	55

== Friendly Tournaments & Local Competitions ==
=== Friendly International Tournaments ===
In March 2023, AFL Israel participated in a friendly tri-series in Sofia, Bulgaria, which also featured a local team from Bulgaria and two teams representing the Wandsworth Demons. The Israeli team lost to both the Wandsworth Demons sides but defeated the Bulgarian national team.

On the 29th of April, 2023, Israel hosted their first ever international game of football in the city of Beersheba to commemorate Anzac Day and the Battle of Beersheba (1917). The Israel team was split into two and they played a knockout tournament that also included a team from the United Arab Emirates and the Vienna Galahs.

In the following year, Israel was set to host the Anzac cup again, featuring teams from Austria and Germany. However the tournament was moved from Israel to Austria due to the Gaza war, which broke out on the 7th of October 2023. Israel defeated the Austrian team, but lost to the German team to finish in second place.

In May 2025, a team representing Israel is set to participate in a friendly contest against teams representing Hungary and Croatia set to be hosted in Gyömrő, Hungary.

=== Local Competitions ===
==== Israel Cup ====
On the 11th of October, AFL Israel hosted the Israel Cup with teams representing Jerusalem and Tel Aviv. The cup competition was played in Sportech South in the City of Tel Aviv and featured players from the Tel Aviv Cheetahs, and Australian expats that either lived in Jerusalem or where in Israel on a program.

In the first edition of the cup, Jerusalem emerged victorious with a late goal to Coby Felbel.

	Goals	Behinds	Total
Tel Aviv Cheetahs	18	14	122
Jerusalem	18	15	123

The second cup will be hosted later in 2025.

==== Holyland Classic ====
The Holyland Classic was a series of games played between Israeli and Australian players dividing into three teams. Each team was captained and coached by senior players. One team was led by current Israel Beast's captain Shir Shalev, another team was led by current leading Goal Scorer Eli Lipshatz, and the third team was led by star player Shir Maran. The tournament was held to strengthen the connection between the Jewish Football Community in Melbourne with AFL Israel as several players that participated in the game were from AJAX Football Club.

==== AFL Winter League ====
In 2025, AFL Israel announced the formation of the first ever winter league with two teams set to play each other over three games. The teams, separated into the Tel Aviv Cheetahs and the Lions, were captained by Rotem Lida and Alon Fink respectively. All the games were played at Yarkon Park in Tel Aviv.

Round 1	Total
Tel Aviv Cheetahs	40
Lions	31

Round 1 of the AFL Winter League kicked off on the 24th of January 2025. The conditions were slippery due to the rain that continued throughout the match. Despite the tough conditions, the Cheetahs were able to win game one by 9-points. The Cheetahs take a 1–0 lead into the second game of the series.

Round 2	Total
Tel Aviv Cheetahs	70
Lions	96

In the second game of the season, the conditions were completely the opposite from game one. The lack of rain and moisture made for a higher scoring game as the Lions tied up the series with a 26-point victory after an impressive second half saw them pull away. This win allowed them to pull equal with the Cheetahs on 1-win a piece heading into game three.

Round 3	Total
Tel Aviv Cheetahs	
Lions	

The third game of the season is scheduled to take place on the 7th of March, and will be the decider for the tournament with both teams going into the game with one-win a piece.

== Records ==
=== Euro Cup Goal Scoring Record ===
Name	Goals	Behind	Total Points
Eli Lipshatz	25	5	155
Shir Maran	17	9	111
Sean Ida	6	9	45
Shlomi Korman	5	4	34
Bezalel Gillis	5	2	32
Rotem Lida	4	2	26
Noam Shapira	3	4	22
Yonatan Shapira	3	1	19
Yonatan Weingrovitz	2	7	19
Alon Fink	2	2	14
Hadar Moran	2	2	14
Nitzan Elad	1	6	12
Toolie Jaworowski	1	1	7
Uri Shapira	1	1	7
Ilan Cohen	1	1	7
Gil Jelinek	1	0	6
Avi Gillis	1	0	6

=== Euro Cup Appearance Records ===
Name	Appearances
Shir Shalev*	25
Shlomi Korman	21
Eli Lipshatz	16
Avi Gillis	15
Bezalel Gillis	15
Navot Yaari	15
Hadar Moran	15
Yonatan Shapira	15
Sean Ida	15
Nitzan Elad	14
Matan Polke	14

=== Euro Cup MVP Award ===
Year	Winner
2018	Shir Shalev*
2019	Eli Lipshatz
2022	Shlomi Korman
2023	Eli Lipshatz
2024	Shir Maran**

* Denotes Captain.

** Selected for Team of the tournament

== AFLW and Youth Teams in Israel ==
AFL Israel has begun training sessions for their youth program, establishing programs in Jerusalem and Nahalal for boys and girls aged between 8 and 12 years old.

Starting in later 2024, members of AFL Israel began recruiting female players to start the first AFLW team in Israel. The new team had their first training session in early November 2024. The women's team is scheduled to play their first internal game on the 7th of March, to coincide with the final game of the AFL Israel Winter League and their International game in Hungary against the Croatian Women's National Team.
