= Basel Dragons AFC =

- Full name: Basel Dragons Australian Football Club
- Sport: Australian rules football
- Founded: 19 October 2018
- League: AFL Switzerland
- Location: Basel, Switzerland
- Stadium: Pruntrutermatte Park
- Colors: Black, red and white
- President: Kelli Donnelly
- Head coach: Hadleigh Fischer
- Captain: Jack Flynn

The Basel Dragons AFC is an Australian rules football club located in Basel, Switzerland. It plays in the AFL Switzerland, of which it is one of the founding members.

The Basel Dragons AFC is a family-friendly club for men, women and children who train and compete. It is the sister club of Port Melbourne Football Club.

== Club history ==
The Basel Dragons AFC was established on 19 October 2018. However, the idea for an Australian football club in Basel was first conceived by club secretary Jason Ransome and club captain Jack Flynn after they participated in the first Australian football match in Switzerland in July 2018. It was an exhibition match between the only club in Switzerland, the Winterthur Lions AFC against the Swiss All Stars, the latter being a combined team of players from around Switzerland. Jack played for the Swiss All Star team and Jason was the field umpire for the match. After that match Jack and Jason went about buying all the necessary equipment and held the first training session on 9 September 2018 at a sport field in Muttenz, Basel. Five men and two juniors turned up to training that day and the first steps were taken to formally put and official club together.

== Club symbols ==
The Basel Dragons AFC symbol is a red and black dragon holding a grey shield with the Basel-Stadt and Basel-Land bishop staffs. The club colours were modelled on the colours of Basel-Stadt and Basel-Land's official flags. The club's official guernsey is red, white and black hoops.

== Domestic league ==
The first domestic Swiss tournament took place on 15 November 2018. Three teams participated in this event: the Basel Dragons, the Winterthur Lions and the Geneva Jets.

The 2019 AFL Switzerland league will begin on 4 May 2019. There will be five rounds and a grand final. The Basel Dragons will host round two on 18 May, and round three on 15 June at the Basel Rugby field Pruntrutermatte Park in Basel.
