= Vienna Kangaroos =

Australian football club in Austria

Names
- Former name: Vienna Dingos (2003–2006)
- Motto: "We are the Kangaroos – boing, boing."

Club details
- Founded: 2003
- Training ground: Jesuitenwiese (2003–2007); Austria Cricket Stadium (2007–?)

The Vienna Kangaroos, originally known as the Vienna Dingos, was an Australian rules football club located in Vienna, Austria. The club existed from 2003 to the mid 2010s.

== History ==
The Vienna Kangaroos Australian rules football club was founded in Vienna, Austria in 2003 by Australian expatriates. In contrast with standard Australian rules football, the Vienna Kangaroos played with 9 players at a time instead of 18 and played on a pitches smaller than on a standard oval of 185 by 155 meters (607 by 509 ft). By 2006, the club had 20 players, most of whom were native Viennese. In the club's early years, its jerseys were provided by a Viennese pub while the remaining expenses were paid for by the players themselves.

The Vienna Kangaroos also effectively functioned as Austria's national Australian rules football team.

The Irish pub, Flanagans, was the first sponsor, providing playing jumpers. The club doubled as the Austria National team in international competitions until the foundation of the country's second club in Graz in 2008, named the Styrian Down Under Dogs.

The side competed as the Austria National team at the Central European Championship in Düsseldorf in 2004 against sides from Germany, Belgium, France and Spain, but did not perform well. It also competed in the 2005 European Championships in London.

In 2006, the team was renamed "Vienna Kangaroos" and after a successful recruiting drive, it increased the number of Austrian-born players that now comprise the majority of players in the side.

Coming into contact with teams in Croatia and Czech Republic, the club began competing with these sides in a "Tri-nations" cup. Austria held the first competition with the "Schnitzel Cup" in July 2006 in Vienna. Then the team travelled to Zagreb to take part in the "Croatia Open" in August and the final event, the "Prague Cup", was held in Prague in September 2006 as part of the Central European Championships.

Since 2006, the Vienna Kangaroos are a registered sports club.

=== 2006 ===
- June 2006 Tri-nation Cup in Vienna, (Austria – Croatia – Czech Republic)
- July 2006 Tri-nation Cup in Zagreb, (Austria – Croatia – Czech Republic)
- August 2006 Tri-nation Cup in Prague, (Austria – Croatia – Czech Republic)
- August 2006 CEAFL Cup in Prague, (Austria – Croatia – Czech Republic – Finland – France)

=== 2007 ===
- 17.03.2007 friendly game against the Munich Kangaroos in Munich
- 04.2007 The Vienna Kanagroos become member of the ASKÖ (~Austrian Sport Association)
- 09.06.2007 CEAFL Cup in Vienna (2nd place)
- 09.08.2007 friendly game against the Munich Kangaroos in Kössen
- 24.08.2007 Tri-nation Cup in Prague (2nd place)
- 15.09.2007 EU Cup in Hamburg
- 06.10.2007 Tri-nation Cup in Zagreb

=== 2008 ===
- 03.05.2008 CEAFL Cup, Zagreb
- 07.06.2008 Tri Nation Cup, Vienna
- 30.10.2008 friendly game against the Munich Kangaroos in Kössen
- 11.10.2008 EU CUP in Prague (12th place)

=== 2010 ===
With 2010 the Vienna Kangaroos and the Styrian Down Under Dogs are starting the first official Austrian Australian Football league with regular games. Six game days were scheduled to take place. The Kangaroos won the Season against the Styrian Down Under Dogs.

=== 2011 ===
The Vienna Kangaroos are not providing a team for 2011.

=== 2013 ===
- 08.09.2013 Vienna Kangaroos vs Down Under Dogs

The Vienna Kangaroos played a friendly against the Down Under Dogs from Graz. After a very close battle through 3 and a half quarters they lost 59:74

=== 2018 ===
Australian Football in Vienna was revitalised with a new team called the Vienna Galahs, founded by ex-Kangaroo members Seb and Pablo.

== Venues ==
From 2003 to 2007, the Jesuitenwiese in Prater, Vienna functioned as the Vienna Kangaroo's training ground. In 2007, the club moved its training ground to the Austria Cricket Stadium.

== Culture ==
The club's motto was "We are the Kangaroos – boing, boing."

== See also ==
- Australian rules football in Europe
