= Ron Van T'Hag =

Australian rules footballer

Personal information
- Full name: Ron Van T'Hag
- Born: 6 July 1940; Almelo, Overijssel, Netherlands
- Original team: Torquay
- Height: 183 cm (6 ft 0 in)
- Weight: 70 kg (154 lb)

Playing career^{1}
Years	Club	Games (Goals)
1959	Geelong	2 (0)
- ^{1} Playing statistics correct to the end of 1959.

Ron Van T'Hag (born 6 July 1940) is a former Australian rules footballer who played with Geelong in the Victorian Football League (VFL).

Originally from Almelo in the Netherlands, he emigrated to Australia with his parents at the age of 13.
