= 2009 EU Cup Australian rules football =

4th EU Cup - Aussie Rules: Samobor 2009 -
Teams	15
Host	(Croatia) Samobor
Date	3–5 October 2009
Podium
Champions; Runners-up; Third place Fourth place	England; Netherlands; Croatia; Spain

The 2009 EU Cup of Australian rules football was held in Samobor (Croatia) from 3 until 9 October 2009, with 15 national teams.

== Venue ==
Matches were played on the small stadium of NK Samobor (main and auxiliary ground).

== Teams ==
Group A
England
Finland
Czech Republic
Andorra

Group B
Croatia
France
Scotland
Austria

Group C
Germany
The Netherlands
Iceland
Italy

Group D
Spain
(Republic of Ireland) Ireland
(European Union) EU Crusaders

== Pools round ==
=== Group A ===
Team	Score	Team	Score
England	15.8 (98)	Czech Republic	6.4 (40)
Finland	10.4 (64)	Andorra	10.1 (61)
Finland	11.6 (72)	Czech Republic	8.4 (52)
England	17.5 (107)	Andorra	8.3 (51)
England	11.10 (76)	Finland	9.4 (58)
Andorra	11.1 (67)	Czech Republic	8.3 (51)

=== Group B ===
Team	Score	Team	Score
Croatia	20.10 (130)	Austria	5.6 (36)
Scotland	15.13 (103)	France	7.5 (47)
Croatia	12.5 (77)	Scotland	9.6 (60)
France	15.10 (100)	Austria	8.6 (54)
Croatia	13.10 (88)	France	9.4 (58)
Scotland	22.9 (141)	Austria	7.5 (47)

=== Group C ===
Team	Score	Team	Score
Germany	10.6 (66)	Iceland	10.1 (61)
Netherlands	12.4 (76)	Italy	7.8 (50)
Germany	12.7 (79)	Italy	7.6 (48)
Netherlands	12.6 (78)	Iceland	11.8 (74)
Iceland	14.11 (95)	Italy	10.6 (66)
Netherlands	10.10 (70)	Germany	11.3 (69)

=== Group D ===
Team	Score	Team	Score
Spain	12.7 (79)	(European Union) EU Crusaders	6.3 (39)
(European Union) EU Crusaders	8.5 (53)	(Republic of Ireland) Ireland	6.9 (45)
(Republic of Ireland) Ireland	10.8 (68)	Spain	10.7 (67)

== Semi finals ==
Match	Team	Score	Team	Score
Cup Semi Final	Netherlands	12.6 (78)	Croatia	10.7 (67)
Cup Semi Final	England	13.10 (88)	Spain	9.8 (62)
Bowl Semi Final	Iceland	16.9 (105)	France	10.5 (65)
Bowl Semi Final	(European Union) EU Crusaders	7.10 (52)	Andorra	8.3 (51)
Plate Semi Final	Scotland	12.8 (80)	Germany	11.5 (71)
Plate Semi Final	(Republic of Ireland) Ireland	13.13 (91)	Finland	7.2 (44)

== Ranking Matches ==
Match	Team	Score	Team	Score
13th Place Final	Italy	14.8 (92)	Austria	7.5 (47)
Plate Final	Iceland	10.11 (71)	(European Union) EU Crusaders	8.4 (52)
Bowl Final	Scotland	13.9 (87)	(Republic of Ireland) Ireland	8.7 (55)
3rd Place Final	Croatia	15.10 (100)	Spain	8.5 (53)

== Grand final ==
Team	Score	Team	Score
England	12.9 (81)	Netherlands	8.9 (57)

Best on Ground: Will Worthington (England)

== Final standings ==
1. England (EU Cup Winners)
2. The Netherlands (Silver)
3. Croatia (Bronze)
4. Spain
5. Scotland (Plate Winners)
6. Ireland
7. Finland
8. Germany
9. Iceland (Bowl Winners)
10. EU Crusaders
11. Andorra
12. France
13. Italy
14. Austria
15. Czech Republic

EU Cup Best & Fairest: Tomas Lundon (Ireland) & Josip Kravar (Croatia) – 16 votes

Leading Goalkicker: Marcus Crook (Scotland) – 12 goals
