= 2010 EU Cup Australian rules football =

5th EU Cup - Aussie Rules: Milan 2010 -
| Teams | 15 |
| Host | (Italy) Milan |
| Date | 2 October 2010 |
Podium
| Champions; Runners-up; Third place Fourth place | Croatia; Netherlands (Republic of Ireland) Ireland; England |

The 2010 Euro Cup of Australian rules football was held in Milan (Italy) on 2 October 2010, with 15 national teams. For the first time a women's international match took place during the competition.

== Venue ==
Matches were played at one of the best stadiums in the area, the Marazzini Venegoni Sports Centre in Parabiago.

== Teams ==
Group A
| (Republic of Ireland) Ireland |
| France |
| Spain |
| (European Union) EU Crusaders |

Group B
| Germany |
| Czech Republic |
| England |
| Switzerland |

Group C
| Scotland |
| The Netherlands |
| Catalonia |
| Italy |

Group D
| Croatia |
| Austria |
| Wales |

Women's
| Italy |
| (Republic of Ireland) Ireland |

== Pools round ==
=== Group A ===
| Team | Score | Team | Score |
|---|---|---|---|
| (Republic of Ireland) Ireland | 5.8 (38) | France | 2.2 (14) |
| Spain | 6.8 (44) | (European Union) EU Crusaders | 2.1 (13) |
| Spain | 4.3 (27) | France | 1.9 (15) |
| (Republic of Ireland) Ireland | 10.7 (67) | (European Union) EU Crusaders | N/A |
| (Republic of Ireland) Ireland | 6.11 (47) | Spain | 2.0 (12) |
| France | 10.3 (63) | (European Union) EU Crusaders | 1.1 (7) |

=== Group B ===
| Team | Score | Team | Score |
|---|---|---|---|
| Germany | 6.7 (43) | Czech Republic | 0.2 (2) |
| England | 9.7 (61) | Switzerland | 1.1 (7) |
| England | 8.8 (56) | Czech Republic | 1.1 (7) |
| Germany | 5.2 (32) | Switzerland | 1.3 (9) |
| England | 5.8 (38) | Germany | 2.0 (12) |
| Switzerland | 7.2 (44) | Czech Republic | 4.1 (25) |

=== Group C ===
| Team | Score | Team | Score |
|---|---|---|---|
| Netherlands | 4.3 (27) | Scotland | 3.3 (21) |
| Italy | 5.9 (39) | Catalonia | 0.2 (2) |
| Netherlands | 6.7 (43) | Catalonia | 1.0 (6) |
| Italy | 7.2 (44) | Scotland | 5.4 (34) |
| Netherlands | 5.5 (35) | Italy | 2.7 (19) |
| Scotland | 7.7 (49) | Catalonia | 2.3 (15) |

=== Group D ===
| Team | Score | Team | Score |
|---|---|---|---|
| Croatia | 8.6 (54) | Austria | 1.2 (8) |
| Wales | 5.10 (40) | Austria | 0.4 (4) |
| Croatia | 7.9 (51) | Wales | 4.0 (24) |

== Semi finals ==
| Match | Team | Score | Team | Score |
|---|---|---|---|---|
| Cup Semi Final | Netherlands | 6.0 (36) | England | 4.8 (32) |
| Cup Semi Final | Croatia | 5.2 (32) | (Republic of Ireland) Ireland | 2.5 (17) |
| Plate Semi Final | Italy | 3.5 (23) | Germany | 2.5 (17) |
| Plate Semi Final | Spain | 5.1 (31) | Wales | 3.6 (24) |
| Bowl Semi Final | Scotland | 7.5 (47) | Switzerland | 0.4 (4) |
| Bowl Semi Final | France | 7.14 (56) | Austria | 1.1 (7) |

== Ranking Matches ==
| Match | Team | Score | Team | Score |
|---|---|---|---|---|
| 13th Place Final | Czech Republic | 2.9 (21) | Catalonia | 2.2 (14) |
| Bowl Final | Scotland | 3.4 (22) | France | 0.3 (3) |
| Plate Final | Spain | 6.3 (39) | Italy | 4.5 (29) |
| 3rd Place Final | (Republic of Ireland) Ireland | 5.9 (39) | England | 1.4 (10) |

== Grand final ==
| Team | Score | Team | Score |
|---|---|---|---|
| Croatia | 6.6 (42) | Netherlands | 5.7 (37) |

== Women's Match ==
| Team | Score | Team | Score |
|---|---|---|---|
| (Republic of Ireland) Ireland Women's | 6.14 (50) | Italy Women's | 6.4 (40) |

== Final standings ==
1. Croatia (EU Cup Winners)
2. The Netherlands (Silver)
3. Ireland (Bronze)
4. England
5. Spain (Plate Winners)
6. Italy
7. Germany
8. Wales
9. Scotland (Bowl Winners)
10. France
11. Switzerland
12. Austria
13. Czech Republic
14. Catalonia
15. EU Crusaders

EU Cup Best & Fairest: Josh Carmichael (Netherlands), Mario Vázquez (Spain) & Sebastian Caffaratti (Italy) - 16 votes

Leading Goalkicker: Josh Carmichael (Netherlands), Jono Newman (Switzerland) & Sebastian Caffaratti (Italy) - 5 goals
