= 2008 EU Cup Australian rules football =

2008 EU Cup - Aussie Rules: Prague 2008 -
| Teams | 12 |
| Host | (Czech Republic) Prague |
| Date | 11 October 2008 |
Podium
| Champions; Runners-up; Third place Fourth place | England; Croatia; Germany; Sweden |

The 2008 EU Cup of Australian rules football was held in Prague (Czech Republic) on 11 October 2008, with 12 teams. The championship was won by England, defeating Croatia in the final.

== Teams ==
Group A
| Germany |
| Finland |
| The Netherlands |

Group B
| England |
| Czech Republic |
| Scotland |

Group C
| Croatia |
| France |
| Austria |

Group D
| Sweden |
| Catalonia |
| (European Union) EU Crusaders |

== Pools round ==
| GROUP A | Pts | P | W | D | L | PF | PA | DP |
|---|---|---|---|---|---|---|---|---|
| Germany | 4 | 2 | 2 | 0 | 0 | 165 | 95 | +70 |
| Finland | 2 | 2 | 1 | 0 | 1 | 106 | 119 | -13 |
| Netherlands | 0 | 2 | 0 | 0 | 2 | 94 | 151 | -57 |

11 October - 10:00
| 11 October - 10:00 | Germany | 89-51 | The Netherlands | Slavia - B Prague |
| 11 October - 10:00 | 13.11 (89) | Details | 8.3 (51) | Slavia - B Prague |

11 October - 11:00
| 11 October - 11:00 | Finland | 62-43 | The Netherlands | Slavia - B Prague |
| 11 October - 11:00 | 8.14 (62) | Details | 7.1 (43) | Slavia - B Prague |

11 October –12:00
| 11 October –12:00 | Germany | 76-44 | Finland | Slavia - B Prague |
| 11 October –12:00 | 12.4 (76) | Details | 6.8 (44) | Slavia - B Prague |

| GROUP B | Pts | P | W | D | L | PF | PA | DP |
|---|---|---|---|---|---|---|---|---|
| England | 4 | 2 | 2 | 0 | 0 | 179 | 89 | +90 |
| Scotland | 2 | 2 | 1 | 0 | 1 | 93 | 132 | -39 |
| Czech Republic | 0 | 2 | 0 | 0 | 2 | 91 | 142 | -51 |

11 October - 10:00
| 11 October - 10:00 | England | 88-42 | Scotland | Slavia - A Prague |
| 11 October - 10:00 | 14.4 (88) | Details | 6.6 (42) | Slavia - A Prague |

11 October - 11:00
| 11 October - 11:00 | Czech Republic | 44-51 | Scotland | Slavia - A Prague |
| 11 October - 11:00 | 6.8 (44) | Details | 7.9 (51) | Slavia - A Prague |

11 October –12:00
| 11 October –12:00 | England | 91-47 | Czech Republic | Slavia - A Prague |
| 11 October –12:00 | 13.13 (91) | Details | 7.5 (47) | Slavia - A Prague |

| GROUP C | Pts | P | W | D | L | PF | PA | DP |
|---|---|---|---|---|---|---|---|---|
| Croatia | 4 | 2 | 2 | 0 | 0 | 186 | 73 | +113 |
| France | 2 | 2 | 1 | 0 | 1 | 135 | 122 | +13 |
| Austria | 0 | 2 | 0 | 0 | 2 | 65 | 191 | 126 |

11 October - 10:30
| 11 October - 10:30 | Croatia | 103-26 | Austria | Slavia - B Prague |
| 11 October - 10:30 | 16.7 (103) | Details | 4.2 (26) | Slavia - B Prague |

11 October - 11:30
| 11 October - 11:30 | France | 88-39 | Austria | Slavia - B Prague |
| 11 October - 11:30 | 13.10 (88) | Details | 6.3 (39) | Slavia - B Prague |

11 October –12:30
| 11 October –12:30 | Croatia | 83-47 | France | Slavia - B Prague |
| 11 October –12:30 | 12.11 (83) | Details | 7.5 (47) | Slavia - B Prague |

| GROUP D | Pts | P | W | D | L | PF | PA | DP |
|---|---|---|---|---|---|---|---|---|
| Sweden | 4 | 2 | 2 | 0 | 0 | 184 | 98 | +86 |
| Catalonia | 2 | 2 | 1 | 0 | 1 | 115 | 159 | -44 |
| (European Union) EU Crusaders | 0 | 2 | 0 | 0 | 2 | 106 | 148 | -42 |

11 October - 10:30
| 11 October - 10:30 | Sweden | 84-47 | EU Crusaders | Slavia - A Prague |
| 11 October - 10:30 | 13.6 (84) | Details | 7.5 (47) | Slavia - A Prague |

11 October - 11:30
| 11 October - 11:30 | Catalonia | 64-59 | EU Crusaders | Slavia - A Prague |
| 11 October - 11:30 | 9.10 (64) | Details | 9.5 (59) | Slavia - A Prague |

11 October –12:30
| 11 October –12:30 | Sweden | 100-51 | Catalonia | Slavia - A Prague |
| 11 October –12:30 | 15.10 (100) | Details | 8.3 (51) | Slavia - A Prague |

== Final round ==
1/8-finals
2D | Catalonia | 84
3C | Austria | 53
2A | Finland | 65
3B | Czech Republic | 37
2C | France | 71
3D | (European Union) EU Crusaders | 59
2B | Scotland | 70
3A | The Netherlands | 46

Quarter finals
1B | England | 138
Catalonia | 47
Finland | 41
1D | Sweden | 76
1A | Germany | 75
France | 53
Scotland | 55
1C | Croatia | 97

Semifinals
England | 110
Sweden | 49
Germany | 70
Croatia | 74

Final
England | 107
Croatia | 59

1/8-finals

- Germany, England, Croatia and Sweden are classified to quarterfinals.

11 October –13:00
| 11 October –13:00 | Scotland | 70-46 | The Netherlands | Slavia - A Prague |
| 11 October –13:00 | 10.10 (70) | Details | 7.4 (46) | Slavia - A Prague |

11 October –13:00
| 11 October –13:00 | Finland | 65-37 | Czech Republic | Slavia - B Prague |
| 11 October –13:00 | 9.11 (65) | Details | 5.7 (37) | Slavia - B Prague |

11 October –13:30
| 11 October –13:30 | Catalonia | 84-53 | Austria | Slavia - A Prague |
| 11 October –13:30 | 13.6 (84) | Details | 8.5 (53) | Slavia - A Prague |

11 October –13:30
| 11 October –13:30 | France | 71-59 | (European Union) EU Crusaders | Slavia - B Prague |
| 11 October –13:30 | 10.11 (71) | Details | 9.5 (59) | Slavia - B Prague |

9-12 places

11 October –14:30
| 11 October –14:30 | The Netherlands | 54-51 | Czech Republic | Slavia - B Prague |
| 11 October –14:30 | 8.6 (54) | Details | 7.9 (51) | Slavia - B Prague |

11 October –15:00
| 11 October –15:00 | Austria | 47-102 | (European Union) EU Crusaders | Slavia - B Prague |
| 11 October –15:00 | 7.5 (47) | Details | 16.6 (102) | Slavia - B Prague |

Quarter finals

11 October –14:30
| 11 October –14:30 | England | 138-47 | Catalonia | Slavia - A Prague |
| 11 October –14:30 | 21.12 (138) | Details | 7.5 (47) | Slavia - A Prague |

11 October –15:00
| 11 October –15:00 | Sweden | 76-41 | Finland | Slavia - A Prague |
| 11 October –15:00 | 11.10 (76) | Details | 5.11 (41) | Slavia - A Prague |

11 October –15:30
| 11 October –15:30 | Germany | 75-53 | France | Slavia - A Prague |
| 11 October –15:30 | 11.9 (75) | Details | 8.5 (53) | Slavia - A Prague |

11 October –16:00
| 11 October –16:00 | Croatia | 97-55 | Scotland | Slavia - A Prague |
| 11 October –16:00 | 15.7 (97) | Details | 8.7 (55) | Slavia - A Prague |

5-8 places

11 October –15:30
| 11 October –15:30 | Catalonia | 53-89 | Finland | Slavia - B Prague |
| 11 October –15:30 | 8.5(53) | Details | 12.17(89) | Slavia - B Prague |

11 October –16:30
| 11 October –16:30 | France | 77-47 | Scotland | Slavia - B Prague |
| 11 October –16:30 | 12.5 (77) | Details | 7.5 (47) | Slavia - B Prague |

Semifinals

11 October –16:30
| 11 October –16:30 | England | 110-49 | Sweden | Slavia - A Prague |
| 11 October –16:30 | 17.8 (110) | Details | 7.7 (49) | Slavia - A Prague |

11 October –17:00
| 11 October –17:00 | Germany | 70-74 | Croatia | Slavia - A Prague |
| 11 October –17:00 | 10.10 (70) | Details | 12.2 (74) | Slavia - A Prague |

11-12 places

11 October –17:30
| 11 October –17:30 | Czech Republic | 71-32 | Austria | Slavia - B Prague |
| 11 October –17:30 | 11.5 (71) | Details | 5.2 (32) | Slavia - B Prague |

9-10 places

11 October –16:30
| 11 October –16:30 | EU Crusaders (European Union) | 62-68 | The Netherlands | Slavia - B Prague |
| 11 October –16:30 | 9.8 (62) | Details | 11.2 (68) | Slavia - B Prague |

7-8 places

11 October –17:30
| 11 October –17:30 | Catalonia | 81-21 | Scotland | Slavia - B Prague |
| 11 October –17:30 | | Details | | Slavia - B Prague |

5-6 places

11 October –17:30
| 11 October –17:30 | Finland | 54-52 | France | Slavia - A Prague |
| 11 October –17:30 | 7.12 (54) | Details | 8.4 (52) | Slavia - A Prague |

3-4 places

11 October –18:00
| 11 October –18:00 | Sweden | 55-98 | Germany | Slavia - A Prague |
| 11 October –18:00 | 8.7 (55) | Details | 15.8 (98) | Slavia - A Prague |

FINAL

11 October –19:00
| 11 October –19:00 | England | 107-59 | Croatia | Slavia - A Prague |
| 11 October –19:00 | 16.11 (107) | Details | 9.5 (59) | Slavia - A Prague |

Winners
England

== Final standings ==
Final standings
| | England |
| | Croatia |
| | Germany |
| 4 | Sweden |
| 5 | Finland |
| 6 | France |
| 7 | Catalonia |
| 8 | Scotland |
| 9 | The Netherlands |
| 10 | (European Union) EU Crusaders |
| 11 | Czech Republic |
| 12 | Austria |

== See also ==
- EU Cup
