= 2007 EU Cup Australian rules football =

2007 EU Cup Aussie Rules: Hamburg 2007 -
Teams	12
Host	(Germany) Hamburg
Date	15 September 2007
Podium • Champion • Runner-up • Third • Fourth	Sweden; Germany; England; Spain

The 2007 EU Cup of Australian rules football was held in Hamburg (Germany) on 15 September 2007, with the attendance of 12 teams. The tournament was won by Sweden defeating Germany in the final.

== Teams ==
Pool A
Germany
Belgium
The Netherlands

Pool B
England
Spain
Czech Republic

Pool C
Sweden
Austria
France

Pool D
Finland
Catalonia
(European Union) EU Crusaders

== Pool matches ==
POOL A	Pts	P	W	D	L	PF	PA	DP
Germany	4	2	2	0	0	90	53	+37
Netherlands	2	2	1	0	1	82	82	=
Belgium	0	2	0	0	2	48	85	-37

15 September 2007; 10:00
15 September 2007; 10:00	Germany	38-18	Belgium	Stadtpark - A Hamburg
15 September 2007; 10:00	6.2 (38)	Details	2.6 (18)	Stadtpark - A Hamburg

15 September 2007; 11:00
15 September 2007; 11:00	Germany	52-35	The Netherlands	Stadtpark - A Hamburg
15 September 2007; 11:00	8.4 (52)	Details	4.11 (35)	Stadtpark - A Hamburg

15 September 2007; 12:00
15 September 2007; 12:00	Belgium	30-47	The Netherlands	Stadtpark - B Hamburg
15 September 2007; 12:00	4.6 (30)	Details	6.11 (47)	Stadtpark - B Hamburg

POOL B	Pts	P	W	D	L	PF	PA	DP
England	4	2	2	0	0	167	65	+102
Czech Republic	2	2	1	0	1	93	110	-17
Spain	0	2	0	0	2	58	143	-85

15 September 2007; 10:00
15 September 2007; 10:00	England	89-26	Spain	Stadtpark - B Hamburg
15 September 2007; 10:00	14.5 (89)	Details	3.8 (26)	Stadtpark - B Hamburg

15 September 2007; 11:00
15 September 2007; 11:00	England	78-39	Czech Republic	Stadtpark - B Hamburg
15 September 2007; 11:00	13.0 (78)	Details	6.3 (39)	Stadtpark - B Hamburg

15 September 2007; 12:00
15 September 2007; 12:00	Spain	32-54	Czech Republic	Stadtpark - A Hamburg
15 September 2007; 12:00	4.8 (32)	Details	8.6 (54)	Stadtpark - A Hamburg

POOL C	Pts	P	W	D	L	PF	PA	DP
Sweden	4	2	2	0	0	189	42	+147
France	2	1	0	1	0	78	106	-28
Austria	0	0	0	2	0	53	172	-119

15 September 2007; 10:30
15 September 2007; 10:30	Sweden	121-15	Austria	Stadtpark - A Hamburg
15 September 2007; 10:30	18.13 (121)	Details	2.3 (15)	Stadtpark - A Hamburg

15 September 2007; 11:30
15 September 2007; 11:30	Sweden	68-27	France	Stadtpark - A Hamburg
15 September 2007; 11:30	10.8 (68)	Details	4.3 (27)	Stadtpark - A Hamburg

15 September 2007; 12:30
15 September 2007; 12:30	Austria	38-51	France	Stadtpark - B Hamburg
15 September 2007; 12:30	6.2 (38)	Details	8.3 (51)	Stadtpark - B Hamburg

POOL D	Pts	P	W	D	L	PF	PA	DP
Finland	4	2	0	0	0	160	76	+84
Catalonia	2	1	0	1	0	122	86	+36
(European Union) EU Crusaders	0	0	0	2	0	36	156	-120

15 September 2007; 10:30
15 September 2007; 10:30	Catalonia	54-72	Finland	Stadtpark - B Hamburg
15 September 2007; 10:30	9.0 (54)	Details	11.6 (72)	Stadtpark - B Hamburg

15 September 2007; 11:30
15 September 2007; 11:30	Catalonia	68-14	EU Crusaders	Stadtpark - B Hamburg
15 September 2007; 11:30	11.2 (68)	Details	EU 2.2(14)	Stadtpark - B Hamburg

15 September 2007; 12:30
15 September 2007; 12:30	Finland	88-22	EU Crusaders	Stadtpark - A Hamburg
15 September 2007; 12:30	14.4 (88)	Details	3.4 (22)	Stadtpark - A Hamburg

== Finals ==
First round
2D	Catalonia	50
3C	Austria	29
2A	The Netherlands	36
3B	Spain	50
2C	France	73
3D	(European Union) EU Crusaders	21
2B	Czech Republic	41
3A	Belgium	37

Quarter finals
1A	Germany	39
2D	Catalonia	38
3B	Spain	37
1D	Finland	35
1B	England	86
2C	France	40
2B	Czech Republic	24
1C	Sweden	55

Semifinals
1A	Germany	77
3B	Spain	38
1B	England	52
1C	Sweden	78

Final
1A	Germany	53
1C	(Sweden) SWEDEN	89

First round

15 September 2007; 13:00
15 September 2007; 13:00	The Netherlands	36-50	Spain	Stadtpark - A Hamburg
15 September 2007; 13:00	5.6 (36)	Details	6.14 (50)	Stadtpark - A Hamburg

15 September 2007; 13:00
15 September 2007; 13:00	Czech Republic	41-37	Belgium	Stadtpark - B Hamburg
15 September 2007; 13:00	6.5 (41)	Details	5.7 (37)	Stadtpark - B Hamburg

15 September 2007; 13:30
15 September 2007; 13:30	France	73-21	EU Crusaders	Stadtpark - A Hamburg
15 September 2007; 13:30	11.7 (73)	Details	3.3 (21)	Stadtpark - A Hamburg

15 September 2007; 13:30
15 September 2007; 13:30	Catalonia	50-29	Austria	Stadtpark - B Hamburg
15 September 2007; 13:30	7.8 (50)	Details	4.5 (29)	Stadtpark - B Hamburg

Quarter finals

15 September 2007; 14:30
15 September 2007; 14:30	Germany	39-38	Catalonia	Stadtpark - A Hamburg
15 September 2007; 14:30	6.3 (39)	Details	6.2 (38)	Stadtpark - A Hamburg

15 September 2007; 14:30
15 September 2007; 14:30	England	86-40	France	Stadtpark - B Hamburg
15 September 2007; 14:30	14.2 (86)	Details	6.4 (40)	Stadtpark - B Hamburg

15 September 2007; 15:00
15 September 2007; 15:00	Sweden	55-24	Czech Republic	Stadtpark - A Hamburg
15 September 2007; 15:00	7.13 (55)	Details	3.6 (24)	Stadtpark - A Hamburg

15 September 2007; 15:00
15 September 2007; 15:00	Finland	35-37	Spain	Stadtpark - B Hamburg
15 September 2007; 15:00	5.5 (35)	Details	5.7 (37)	Stadtpark - B Hamburg

9th-12th places

15 September 2007; 15:30
15 September 2007; 15:30	The Netherlands	Belgium	Stadtpark - A Hamburg

15 September 2007; 15:30
15 September 2007; 15:30	EU Crusaders	Austria	Stadtpark - B Hamburg

5th-8th places

15 September 2007; 16:00
15 September 2007; 16:00	France	25-93	Finland	Stadtpark - A Hamburg
15 September 2007; 16:00	4.1 (25)	Details	14.9 (93)	Stadtpark - A Hamburg

15 September 2007; 16:00
15 September 2007; 16:00	Catalonia	44-81	Czech Republic	Stadtpark - B Hamburg
15 September 2007; 16:00	7.2 (44)	Details	12.9 (81)	Stadtpark - B Hamburg

Semifinals

15 September 2007; 16:30
15 September 2007; 16:30	Germany	77-38	Spain	Stadtpark - A Hamburg
15 September 2007; 16:30	12.5 (77)	Details	5.8 (38)	Stadtpark - A Hamburg

15 September 2007; 16:30
15 September 2007; 16:30	England	52-78	Sweden	Stadtpark - B Hamburg
15 September 2007; 16:30	8.4 (52)	Details	11.12 (78)	Stadtpark - B Hamburg

11th-12th places

15 September 2007; 17:00
15 September 2007; 17:00	Austria	6-6	EU Crusaders	Stadtpark - B Hamburg
15 September 2007; 17:00		Details		Stadtpark - B Hamburg

9th-10th places

15 September 2007; 17:00
15 September 2007; 17:00	Belgium	30-47	The Netherlands	Stadtpark - A Hamburg
15 September 2007; 17:00	4.6 (30)	Details	6.11 (47)	Stadtpark - A Hamburg

7th-8th places

15 September 2007; 17:30
15 September 2007; 17:30	France	58-50	Catalonia	Stadtpark - B Hamburg
15 September 2007; 17:30	9.4 (58)	Details	8.2 (50)	Stadtpark - B Hamburg

5th-6th places

15 September 2007; 17:30
15 September 2007; 17:30	Finland	43-53	Czech Republic	Stadtpark - A Hamburg
15 September 2007; 17:30	7.1 (43)	Details	8.5 (53)	Stadtpark - A Hamburg

3rd-4th places

15 September 2007; 18:00
15 September 2007; 18:00	Spain	0-36	England	Stadtpark - A Hamburg
15 September 2007; 18:00		Details		Stadtpark - A Hamburg

FINAL

15 September 2007; 18:30
15 September 2007; 18:30	Germany	53-89	Sweden	Stadtpark - A Hamburg
15 September 2007; 18:30	8.5 (53)	Details	14.5 (89)	Stadtpark - A Hamburg

Champions
SWEDEN

== Final standings ==
Team
1	Sweden
2	Germany
3	England
4	Spain
5	Czech Republic
6	Finland
7	France
8	Catalonia
9	The Netherlands
10	Belgium
11	Austria
=	(European Union) EU Crusaders

== See also ==
- EU Cup
