= 2005 EU Cup Australian rules football =

1st EU Cup – Aussie Rules; London 2005
Teams	10
Host	London, England, UK
Date	9 October 2005
Podium • Champion • Runner-up • Third • Fourth	Belgium; Sweden; Netherlands; Germany

The 2005 EU Cup of Australian rules football was held in London (England) on 9 October 2005, with 10 national teams. The tournament was won by Belgium who were crowned European Champions after defeating Sweden in the final.

== Teams ==
Pool A
Austria
Belgium
Catalonia
Germany
Israel

Pool B
England
France
Scotland
Netherlands
Sweden

== Pools ==
POOL A	Pts	P	W	D	L	PF	PA	DP
Belgium	6	4	3	0	1	228	129	+99
Germany	6	4	3	0	1	200	156	+44
Israel	6	4	3	0	1	156	112	+44
Catalonia	2	4	1	0	3	158	217	–59
Austria	0	4	0	0	4	92	220	–128

9 October 2005
9 October 2005	Israel	51–10	Austria	Chiswick RFC; London
9 October 2005	[2] 7.7 (51)		[5] 0.5 (10)	Chiswick RFC; London

9 October 2005
9 October 2005	Germany	59–38	Catalonia	Chiswick RFC; London
9 October 2005	[22] 5.7 (59)		[24] 2.2 (38)	Chiswick RFC; London

9 October 2005
9 October 2005	Belgium	62–7	Austria	Chiswick RFC; London
9 October 2005	[3] 9.5 (62)		[5] 0.2 (7)	Chiswick RFC; London

9 October 2005
9 October 2005	Israel	36–31	Catalonia	Chiswick RFC; London
9 October 2005	[2] 5.4 (36)		[24] 0.7 (31)	Chiswick RFC; London

9 October 2005
9 October 2005	Catalonia	51–45	Austria	Chiswick RFC; London
9 October 2005	[24] 4.3 (51)		[5] 6.4 (45)	Chiswick RFC; London

9 October 2005
9 October 2005	Belgium	77–38	Catalonia	Chiswick RFC; London
9 October 2005	[3] 12.2 (77)		[24] 2.2 (38)	Chiswick RFC; London

9 October 2005
9 October 2005	Israel	38–32	Belgium	Chiswick RFC; London
9 October 2005	[2] 5.6 (38)		[3] 3.11 (32)	Chiswick RFC; London

9 October 2005
9 October 2005	Germany	39–31	Israel	Chiswick RFC; London
9 October 2005	[22] 2.5 (39)		[2] 4.5 (31)	Chiswick RFC; London

9 October 2005
9 October 2005	Germany	56–30	Austria	Chiswick RFC; London
9 October 2005	[22] 5.4 (56)		[5] 4.1 (30)	Chiswick RFC; London

9 October 2005
9 October 2005	Belgium	57–46	Germany	Chiswick RFC; London
9 October 2005	[3] 8.6 (57)		[22] 3.6 (46)	Chiswick RFC; London

POOL B	Pts	P	W	D	L	PF	PA	DP
Sweden	8	4	4	0	0	280	153	+127
England	6	4	3	0	1	214	179	+35
Netherlands	4	2	2	0	2	212	210	+2
Scotland	2	4	1	0	3	186	252	–66
France	0	4	0	0	4	176	274	–98

9 October 2005
9 October 2005	England	66–30	Netherlands	Chiswick RFC; London
9 October 2005	[22] 7.2 (66)		[8] 3.4 (30)	Chiswick RFC; London

9 October 2005
9 October 2005	England	49–40	France	Chiswick RFC; London
9 October 2005	[22] 4.3 (49)		[30] 1.4 (40)	Chiswick RFC; London

9 October 2005
9 October 2005		74–42	France	Chiswick RFC; London
9 October 2005	[8] 10.6 (74)		[30] 2.0 (42)	Chiswick RFC; London

9 October 2005
9 October 2005	Sweden	68–36	England	Chiswick RFC; London
9 October 2005	[10] 9.4 (68)		[22] 2.2 (36)	Chiswick RFC; London

9 October 2005
9 October 2005	Scotland	70–52	France	Chiswick RFC; London
9 October 2005	[15] 8.7 (70)		[30] 3.4 (52)	Chiswick RFC; London

9 October 2005
9 October 2005	Sweden	81–42	France	Chiswick RFC; London
9 October 2005	[10] 11.5 (81)		[30] 2.0 (42)	Chiswick RFC; London

9 October 2005
9 October 2005	Sweden	73–31	Scotland	Chiswick RFC; London
9 October 2005	[10] 10.3 (73)		[15] 2.4 (31)	Chiswick RFC; London

9 October 2005
9 October 2005	England	63–41	Scotland	Chiswick RFC; London
9 October 2005	[22] 6.5 (63)		[15] 4.2 (41)	Chiswick RFC; London

9 October 2005
9 October 2005	Netherlands	64–44	Scotland	Chiswick RFC; London
9 October 2005	[8] 8.8 (64)		[15] 4.5 (44)	Chiswick RFC; London

9 October 2005
9 October 2005	Sweden	58–44	Netherlands	Chiswick RFC; London
9 October 2005	[10] 7.6 (58)		[8] 5.6 (44)	Chiswick RFC; London

== Finals ==
Semi-finals
October 9 - London
Belgium	35
Netherlands	20
October 9 - London
Sweden	56
Germany	44

Final
October 9 - London
(Belgium) BELGIUM	78
Sweden	37
Third place
October 9 - London
Netherlands	58
Germany	37

6-8 Places

9 October 2005
9 October 2005	Scotland	36–18	Austria	London
9 October 2005	[15] 3.3 (36)		[5] 2.1 (18)	London

9 October 2005
9 October 2005	Catalonia	53–44	France	London
9 October 2005	[24] 4.5 (53)		[30] 2.2 (44)	London

Semifinals

9 October 2005
9 October 2005	Belgium	35–20	Netherlands	London
9 October 2005	[3] 4.8 (35)		[8] 2.0 (20)	London

9 October 2005
9 October 2005	Sweden	56–44	Germany	London
9 October 2005	[10] 7.4 (56)		[22] 3.4 (44)	London

3rd - 4th places

9 October 2005
9 October 2005	Netherlands	58–37	Germany	London
9 October 2005	[8] 7.8 (58)		[22] 2.3 (37)	London

FINAL

9 October 2005
9 October 2005	Belgium	78–37	Sweden	London
9 October 2005	[3] 12.6 (78)		[10] 4.3 (37)	London

Champion
BELGIUM

== Final standings ==
Equip
1	Belgium
2	Sweden
3	Netherlands
4	Germany
5	Israel
=	England
6	Scotland
7	Catalonia
8	France
=	Austria

- NOTE: Israel and England didn't play the final match, sharing the fifth place.

== See also ==
- EU Cup
