= European Australian Football Tri-nations Tournament =

The European Australian Football Tri-nations Tournament was an Australian rules football competition between national teams from Germany, Denmark and Sweden, first played in 2006.

It was intended to be an annual tournament between the three countries, and was played again in 2007. The series is on hiatus in 2008 whilst the Danish and Swedish teams are in preparation for the Australian Football International Cup.

Denmark has won the competition in both years to date.
