= Nine-a-side footy =

Sport based on Australian rules football

Nine-a-side football is a sport based on Australian rules football played informally by Aussie rules clubs but not yet an official sport in its own right.

9-a-side games are sometimes played on half size fields that are typically rectangular or more commonly rugby or soccer fields, with 9 players on the field at any one time, typically consisting of 3 forwards, 3 backs and 3 centre players. Often two games are played at the same time on a single Australian Rules or cricket pitch. Other times, 9-a-side makes use of the full space of the field when a full complement of players is not available. This variety is a more open, running variety of Australian rules.

== Rules ==
The following rules apply in 9-a-side football as played by Aussie Rules UK:

- Up to 9 players on each team, with 3 players each designated as forwards, centres and backs.
- After each goal the players must be in their respective third of the pitch but may rove freely after the ball-up.
- Goals and behinds may only be scored from within the forward zone.
- Players may bounce the ball only once before disposing of it.
- If the ball goes out of play (whether on the full or not) the nearest opponent shall kick the ball back into play.

== Advantages ==
Australian rules football has struggled to develop outside Australia partly because the game is highly resource intensive. A game requires the use of a large cricket oval, many players (40 including interchanges) and several officials. The adaptation of the game to rugby fields requires far fewer players and a pitch that is more readily available, and as a result, many more people are being introduced to the game outside Australia.

== Competitions ==
Examples of official tournaments held under these rules include:

- The EU Cup
- European leagues: Australian Rules Football League of Ireland, Scottish Australian Rules Football League, Welsh Australian Rules Football League
- Haggis Cup
- Bali Nines
- Aussie Rules UK National League and India

== Existing formats ==
- AFL 9s, sanctioned by the Australian Football League is the non-contact game replacing the earlier rec footy.
- Touch Aussie Rules, sanctioned by Aussie Rules UK is the non-contact game played in the UK.
- Metro Footy is a 9-a-side game played on gridiron fields in the United States.

== See also ==
- Six-man football (gridiron)
- Eight-man football (gridiron)
- Five-a-side football (soccer)
- Rugby sevens
- Rugby tens
