= 2024 Transatlantic Cup =

2024 AFL Transatlantic Cup
Tournament details
- Host country: Canada
- Dates: 3–11 August 2024
- Teams: 12 (6 Men's, 6 Women's)

Final positions
- Champions: Ireland (Men's) (1st title); Ireland (Women's) (1st title)
- Runners-up: United States (Men's); United States (Women's)

Tournament statistics
- Matches played: 30 (15 Men's, 15 Women's)

The 2024 Transatlantic Cup was the inaugural edition of the AFL Transatlantic Cup, an international Australian rules football competition run by the Australian Football League (AFL).

It was contested between 3–11 August 2024, with games played in Toronto, Canada. Ireland achieved its 1st men's title and women's title.

== Participating teams ==
The following teams took part in the tournament.

Men's	Women's
Canada (hosts); Colombia; France (United Kingdom) Great Britain; Ireland; United States	Canada (hosts); Colombia; France (United Kingdom) Great Britain; Ireland; United States

== Venue ==
Humber College in Etobicoke, Toronto was named as the host venue for the tournament.

2024 Transatlantic Cup is located in Canada	Toronto
2024 Transatlantic Cup is located in Canada	Humber College Australian Football Field

== Men's tournament ==
=== Standings ===
Pos	Grp	Team	Pld	W	L	D	PF	PA	PP	Pts	Qualification
1	B	(United Kingdom) Great Britain	3	3	0	0	258	51	505.9	12	Advance to finals
2	B	Ireland	3	2	1	0	243	81	300.0	8	Advance to finals
3	B	France	3	2	1	0	153	119	128.6	8	Advance to the fifth place play-off
4	A	United States	3	2	1	0	138	126	109.5	8	Advance to finals
5	A	Canada (H)	3	0	3	0	94	211	44.5	0	Advance to finals
6	A	Colombia	3	0	3	0	19	317	6.0	0	Advance to the fifth place play-off

Source: AFL Transatlantic Cup
Rules for classification: 1) Points; 2) Points percentage; 3) Points for
(H) Hosts

=== Matches ===
	Round 1
3 August 2024 (09:30)	Ireland 16.14 (110)	def.	Colombia 0.1 (1)	Humber College Australian Football Field, Etobicoke	Report
3 August 2024 (11:45)	United States 8.11 (59)	def.	France 4.4 (28)	Humber College Australian Football Field, Etobicoke	Report
3 August 2024 (14:00)	Canada 3.5 (23)	def. by	(United Kingdom) Great Britain 9.8 (62)	Humber College Australian Football Field, Etobicoke	Report

	Round 2
5 August 2024 (09:30)	United States 4.2 (26)	def. by	(United Kingdom) Great Britain 6.11 (47)	Humber College Australian Football Field, Etobicoke	Report
5 August 2024 (11:45)	Ireland 12.10 (82)	def.	Canada 4.3 (27)	Humber College Australian Football Field, Etobicoke	Report
5 August 2024 (14:00)	Colombia 2.4 (16)	def. by	France 8.10 (58)	Humber College Australian Football Field, Etobicoke	Report

	Round 3
7 August 2024 (09:30)	Ireland 7.9 (51)	def. by	United States 8.5 (53)	Humber College Australian Football Field, Etobicoke	Report
7 August 2024 (11:45)	Canada 7.2 (44)	def. by	France 10.7 (67)	Humber College Australian Football Field, Etobicoke	Report
7 August 2024 (14:00)	Colombia 0.2 (2)	def. by	(United Kingdom) Great Britain 23.11 (149)	Humber College Australian Football Field, Etobicoke	Report

=== Play-offs ===
	Fifth place play-off
9 August 2024 (09:30)	Colombia 2.6 (18)	def. by	France 14.14 (98)	Humber College Australian Football Field, Etobicoke	Report

	Play-offs
10 August 2024 (13:30)	Canada 11.14 (80)	def.	Colombia 3.8 (26)	Humber College Australian Football Field, Etobicoke	Report
11 August 2024 (09:30)	Great Britain (United Kingdom) 6.6 (42)	def.	France 3.5 (23)	Humber College Australian Football Field, Etobicoke	Report

=== Finals ===
==== Bracket ====
Semi-finals
9 August 2024
(United Kingdom) Great Britain	4.9 (33)
Ireland	6.9 (45)
9 August 2024
United States	9.9 (63)
Canada	1.5 (11)

Final
11 August 2024
Ireland	9.10 (64)
United States	3.8 (26)

==== Matches ====
	Semi-finals
9 August 2024 (11:45)	Great Britain (United Kingdom) 4.9 (33)	def. by	Ireland 6.9 (45)	Humber College Australian Football Field, Etobicoke	Report
9 August 2024 (14:00)	United States 9.9 (63)	def.	Canada 1.5 (11)	Humber College Australian Football Field, Etobicoke	Report

	Final
11 August 2024 (13:45)	Ireland 9.10 (64)	def.	United States 3.8 (26)	Humber College Australian Football Field, Etobicoke	Report

== Women's tournament ==
=== Standings ===
Pos	Grp	Team	Pld	W	L	D	PF	PA	PP	Pts	Qualification
1	B	Ireland	3	2	1	0	228	67	340.3	8	Advance to finals
2	A	United States	3	2	1	0	191	69	276.8	8	Advance to finals
3	A	Canada (H)	3	2	1	0	112	54	207.4	8	Advance to finals
4	B	(United Kingdom) Great Britain	3	2	1	0	90	54	166.7	8	Advance to finals
5	A	Colombia	3	1	2	0	37	197	18.8	4	Advance to the fifth place play-off
6	B	France	3	0	3	0	2	219	0.9	0	Advance to the fifth place play-off

Source: AFL Transatlantic Cup
Rules for classification: 1) Points; 2) Points percentage; 3) Points for
(H) Hosts

=== Matches ===
	Round 1
2 August 2024 (10:00)	Ireland (Republic of Ireland) 7.14 (56)	def.	United States 5.2 (32)	Humber College Australian Football Field, Etobicoke	Report
2 August 2024 (12:00)	Canada 3.2 (20)	def. by	(United Kingdom) Great Britain 3.4 (22)	Humber College Australian Football Field, Etobicoke	Report
2 August 2024 (14:00)	France 0.2 (2)	def. by	Colombia 5.7 (37)	Humber College Australian Football Field, Etobicoke	Report

	Round 2
4 August 2024 (10:00)	Great Britain (United Kingdom) 7.13 (55)	def.	Colombia 0.0 (0)	Humber College Australian Football Field, Etobicoke	Report
4 August 2024 (12:00)	Ireland (Republic of Ireland) 5.2 (32)	def. by	Canada 5.5 (35)	Humber College Australian Football Field, Etobicoke	Report
4 August 2024 (14:00)	France 0.0 (0)	def. by	United States 18.17 (125)	Humber College Australian Football Field, Etobicoke	Report

	Round 3
6 August 2024 (10:00)	Canada 7.15 (57)	def.	France 0.0 (0)	Humber College Australian Football Field, Etobicoke	Report
6 August 2024 (12:00)	Ireland (Republic of Ireland) 21.14 (140)	def.	Colombia 0.0 (0)	Humber College Australian Football Field, Etobicoke	Report
6 August 2024 (14:00)	Great Britain (United Kingdom) 2.1 (13)	def. by	United States 5.4 (34)	Humber College Australian Football Field, Etobicoke	Report

=== Play-offs ===
	Fifth place play-off
8 August 2024 (10:00)	Colombia 2.6 (18)	def.	France 1.2 (8)	Humber College Australian Football Field, Etobicoke	Report

	Play-offs
10 August 2024 (09:30)	Great Britain (United Kingdom) 14.12 (96)	def.	France 0.0 (0)	Humber College Australian Football Field, Etobicoke	Report
10 August 2024 (11:30)	Canada 16.11 (107)	def.	Colombia 1.0 (6)	Humber College Australian Football Field, Etobicoke	Report

=== Finals ===
==== Bracket ====
Semi-finals
8 August 2024
Ireland	9.3 (57)
(United Kingdom) Great Britain	2.5 (17)
8 August 2024
United States	1.8 (14)
Canada	2.1 (13)

Final
11 August 2024
Ireland	7.6 (48)
United States	4.6 (30)

==== Matches ====
	Semi-finals
8 August 2024 (12:00)	Ireland (Republic of Ireland) 9.3 (57)	def.	(United Kingdom) Great Britain 2.5 (17)	Humber College Australian Football Field, Etobicoke	Report
8 August 2024 (14:00)	United States 1.8 (14)	def.	Canada 2.1 (13)	Humber College Australian Football Field, Etobicoke	Report

	Final
11 August 2024 (11:45)	Ireland (Republic of Ireland) 7.6 (48)	def.	United States 4.6 (30)	Humber College Australian Football Field, Etobicoke	Report

== See also ==
- Australian Football League
- Australian Football International Cup
- Australian rules football around the world
