= Geography of Australian rules football =

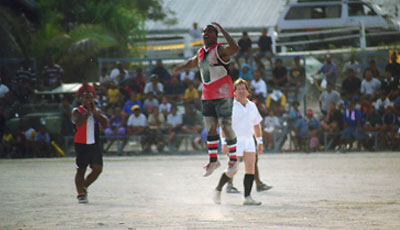
Action from a match at the Linkbelt Oval in Nauru in 1999. Australian rules football in Nauru is the national sport.

Map of the world indicating the nations where Australian rules football was most played in 2009. The stronger regions are indicated in shades of red, areas in which it was most played; areas where it was unknown or least played are indicated in grey.

Australian rules football is played in more than 60 countries around the world with approximately 1.4 million players worldwide. By 2017 more than 26 nations (excluding Australia) had contested the Australian Football International Cup, the highest level of worldwide competition. The AFL Commission is the world governing body which manages international competition through its International Development Committee headed by Andrew Dillon. There are 3 regional governing bodies affiliated to the AFL: AFL Asia, AFL South Pacific and AFL Europe.

Australia is the only country with professional teams, now located in every state. However it is strongest (by participation rate and overall interest) in the Australian states and territories of the Northern Territory, South Australia, Victoria, Western Australia and Tasmania. The sport is moderately popular in Queensland, New South Wales and the Australian Capital Territory. These account for more than half of the population, and are part of a cultural divide known as the Barassi line, however player numbers there have grown significantly in recent decades.

In the last century it has grown as a spectator sport in many countries. It is extremely popular in Nauru where it is considered the national sport and has the highest participation rate in the world. It also has a small but growing audience in New Zealand and China where recent Australian Football League (AFL) premiership matches have been played. It has also gone through a recent revival in Papua New Guinea after several decades of decline. Since its relatively recent introduction to the South Pacific and the Indian subcontinent the code has grown rapidly particularly in Pakistan, India and Fiji. In India, the sport has attracted crowds with thousands of spectators to local matches, with the record of 20,000 being the highest outside of Australia.

While Australia still accounts for the overwhelming majority of players worldwide, the sport outside of Australia has grown rapidly since the 1980s, from just a few hundred players in a handful of clubs and countries to a record 170,744 (compared to Australia's 549,400) by 2017. Prior to the COVID-19 pandemic, the sport outside of Australia was growing at a rate of 25% per annum (compared to Australia's growth rate of 10%) with the majority of this growth coming from the Asia Pacific region. Countries outside of Australia now account for almost a third of the sport's total players. Only a fraction of these players have access to a pathway to play the sport professionally, as such the majority of professional players still come from Australia. Despite these obstacles, players from all Australian states and territories have been inducted into the Australian Football Hall of Fame. In 2013 Jim Stynes was posthumously recognised as the first overseas born and raised Hall of Famer. Since the 2010s internationally developed players have begun to register matches at international, professional level or both, including Hewago Oea (Papua New Guinea/AFL) and Danielle Marshall (United States/AFLW).

Australian rules football spread throughout the world by the 1910s, however in the first major study of the early international growth of the code de Moore (2021) cites a "lack of systematic support from its heartland" and the then VFL (now AFL)'s disregard for representative football, amateurism and the global growth in popularity of other football codes (particularly rugby) as the key reasons for the code's rapid early 20th century decline in places like South Africa, New Zealand and the United States. Similar reasons caused the code to disappear in Queensland and much of New South Wales at the end of the 19th century.

The first tournament to feature a national side (New Zealand) was the 1908 Jubilee Australasian Football Carnival. The first recognised contest between two open level national sides was in 1976 between Papua New Guinea and Nauru in front of a crowd of over 10,000 at Sir Hubert Murray Stadium in Port Moresby which was won by PNG by 129 points. There are now several large 18 or 16 a side international tournaments, the biggest worldwide being: the Australian Football International Cup (2002–), AFL Europe Championship (2010–), Asian Australian Football Championships (1999–), 49th Parallel Cup (1999–), AFL Pacific Cup (2024–), AFL Transatlantic Cup (2024–) and AFL Asia Cup (2024–) which also feature underage divisions. There are also dedicated junior international competitions, the biggest being the Oceania Cup (2009–) in which eight pacific nations have competed, and the Pacific Cup.

The first ever full international match involving Australia was played in 1977 at under 17 level against Papua New Guinea in Adelaide, with Australia taking the honours. Australia has, however, never competed at open international level. Since the 2000s it began to participate in matches against the senior teams of South Africa (2007–2010) and New Zealand (2012–2019) as the development AFL Academy side and state amateur teams have also contested these and other countries and composite World XVIII teams. In addition, indigenous and multicultural teams from Australia have competed internationally including the Flying Boomerangs in the Pacific region and a Indigenous & Multicultural (OzIM) composite amateurs team into the 2011 Australian Football International Cup.

== Players ==
=== Participation ===
The latest figures released in 2019 indicate that there are 185,173 players outside of Australia growing at around 10% per annum. The majority of the growth since the 2010s has been in the Asia, with the largest increases in participation being registered in the Indian subcontinent.

The table below includes officially reported numbers from countries that have had a representative team compete in a major international tournament.

Country	Administrative Region/Body	Overview	Clubs	Adult males*	Adult females*	Best international result/s (men's)	Best international result/s (women's)
Australia		Overview	2,672	439,569	121,031	N/A	
Pakistan	AFL Asia	Overview	11	2,715	1,455	12th (IC 2014)	8th (IC 2017)
India	AFL Asia	Overview	11	2,845	518	16th (IC 2008)	
Papua New Guinea	AFL South Pacific	Overview	64	1,920	200	1st (IC 2008, 2014, 2017)	5th (IC 2017)
United States	Americas	Overview	50	2,000	230	3rd (IC 2011)	3rd (IC 2014)
South Africa	Africa	Overview	138	2,000		3rd (IC 2008)	
China	AFL Asia	Overview	14	1,689	1,230	13th (IC 2017)	
Canada	Americas	Overview	41	876	120	5th (IC 2014)	1st (IC 2014)
United Kingdom	AFL Europe	Overview	59	750		6th (IC 2017), 1st (AFL Europe 2016, 2019)	3rd (IC 2017)
New Zealand	AFL South Pacific	Overview	20	700	2,700	1st (IC 2005)	
Nauru	AFL South Pacific	Overview	18	680	120	5th (IC 2017)	
Japan	AFL Asia	Overview	15	236	26	8th (IC 2008)	
Fiji	AFL South Pacific	Overview	12	200	30	8th (IC 2017)	5th (IC 2014)
Sweden	AFL Europe	Overview	9	257		11th (IC 2011)	
(Republic of Ireland) Ireland	AFL Europe	Overview	9	200		1st (IC 2002, 2011)	1st (IC 2011, 2017)
France	AFL Europe	Overview	8	200		10th (IC 2017)	
Denmark	AFL Europe	Overview	6	180		4th (IC 2002)	
Germany	AFL Europe	Overview	6	180	30	12th (IC 2017)	
Colombia	Americas	Overview	2	150	150	2024 Transatlantic cup	2024 Transatlantic cup
Croatia	AFL Europe	Overview	4	100	30	11th (IC 2017)	
Indonesia	AFL Asia	Overview	3	60		16th (IC 2017)	
Finland	AFL Europe	Overview	2	40		14th (IC 2008)	
Sri Lanka	AFL Asia	Overview	1	65		15th (IC 2017)	
Tonga	AFL South Pacific	Overview	1	20	20	6th (IC 2014)	6th (IC 2014)
Samoa	AFL South Pacific	Overview	1	20	20	5th (IC 2005)	

In 2007 there was just 34,845 players outside of Australia. This figure had grown to 106,000 in 2016 and at least 20 leagues recognised by the game's governing body. By 2017 the figure was 170,744 (11% of total players) growing at a rate of 25% per annum. Since 2017, regional bodies such as AFL Asia and AFL Europe have published annual censuses of participation, providing a better picture of the sport's global participation.

=== Professionalism ===
The Australian Football League is the only fully professional competition in the world and there are currently no high-profile semi-professional competitions located outside of Australia. According to a 2023 study by CodeSports the professional AFL ignores the vast majority of its national and worldwide grassroots in its player pathway to focus almost exclusively on Melbourne's wealthy private schools through the Talent League and the AFL draft. It, South Australia and Tasmania are the only jurisdictions in the world from which the number of professional AFL players are disproportionately higher than their share of registered players. Together more than 75% of all professional players are from these 3 southeastern states.

There have been several players in the VFL/AFL who were born outside Australia and since 1982, an increasing number of players have been recruited from outside Australia through initiatives such as the Irish experiment and more recently, international scholarship programs. There are currently limited pathways for amateur players overseas into the AFL and AFL Women's, however talented players may be identified via international tournaments.

Despite these obstacles, players from all Australian states and territories have been inducted into the Australian Football Hall of Fame. In 2013 Jim Stynes was posthumously recognised as the first overseas born and raised Hall of Famer. Since the 2010s internationally developed players have begun to register matches at international, professional level or both, including Hewago Oea (Papua New Guinea/AFL) and Danielle Marshall (United States/AFLW).

== Australian rules football in Australia ==
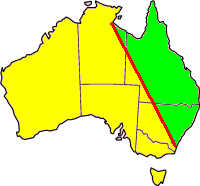
The 'Barassi Line' has traditionally divided Australia, with the code's popularity being highest to the west of the line (yellow area).

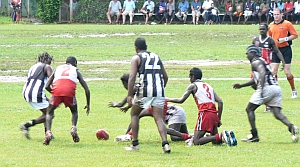
Tiwi Islands Football League in the Northern Territory. More than 35% of the Tiwi Islands play it. Australian rules has the highest rate of football participation (5.7%) in Outback Australia and Aboriginal Australian communities.

Australian rules football traditionally has seen its greatest support in Western Australia, South Australia, Victoria, Tasmania, the Northern Territory and the Riverina region of New South Wales. The Barassi Line is used to the dichotomy in support for the code between the south west and north east of the country and areas where rugby football is significantly more popular. In some areas, such as Western Sydney and Western Queensland, the code is still barely known.

Professional leagues were historically state-specific until VFL's (now AFL) national expansion in 1982 which resulted in clubs in Sydney, Brisbane, Perth and Adelaide by 1991. While players had previously been recruited from others states to the VFL (as well as other state leagues), this reduced the significance of existing state leagues to semi-professional feeder competitions. With its new national focus the AFL implemented a National draft giving its clubs access to talent throughout the country.

According to the ABC, the AFL draft has provided a proven talent pathway across the entire country with players drafted from all states and territories. When broken down regionally, however there are some marked disparities in the AFL pathway. By far the most professional talent per capita is from the Riverina in New South Wales with 8.5 AFL players per 10,000 head of population. In terms of direct recruitment from community clubs, areas such as Queensland's West and Wide Bay–Burnett and New South Wales' Mid North Coast, Southern Highlands and Shoalhaven have produced no players since the inception of the national draft up to 2021.

While Victoria in 2017 accounted for just 30% of all players worldwide, and 40% of Australian players, more than 60% of the professional AFL players played their junior football there, reflecting also the composition of the competition's professional clubs.

Since becoming a national league, the AFL has continued its attempt to grow in areas such as Western Sydney which have high populations but an extremely low participation and audience and has done this primarily by establishing professional teams and academies in these areas.

Region/State/Territory	Overview	Registered players in 2023
(New South Wales) National	Overview	555,629
New South Wales	Overview	71,481
(Victoria (state)) Victoria	Overview	235,970
Queensland	Overview	68,354
Western Australia	Overview	95,407
South Australia	Overview	69,868
Tasmania	Overview	14,528
Australian Capital Territory	Overview	8,326
Northern Territory	Overview	9,743

== Outside Australia ==
=== History ===
==== Early beginnings: 1868–1906 ====
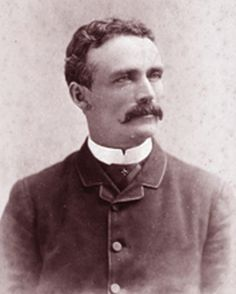
H. C. A. Harrison, the "Father of Australian Football" had a significant interest in the growth of the game outside of Australia

As the game was becoming established in Australia, it was also establishing outposts around the world.

It was played in New Zealand as early as 1868 and possibly earlier with clubs at Nelson and Wellington adopting the code, as early clubs experimented with rules from rugby and soccer. The game later boomed between 1903 and 1909 until it succumbed to the rise of rugby football's popularity and was ultimately expelled from the Australasian Football Council in 1914.

Australian rules football in Ireland is suggested by some Irish historians including Paddy Begley to have originated with returning Irishmen from the Australian goldfields in County Kerry as early as 1874, which other Irish historians claim formed the early basis for Gaelic football in that country. Any Australian roots were quickly forgotten after Gaelic football's codification in 1887 as a hybrid with soccer and the popularity of the first All-Ireland championship.

H C A Harrison, considered the "father of Australian Football" toured Auckland in 1883 with the Australian cricket team and met with the governing body of Rugby Union, proposing that it switch to Victorian Association Rules, and would be in turn raising the idea of a universal form of football with football authorities in England. New Zealand football officials also noted English officials rejection of Harrison's suggestion during his visit to London that rugby clubs there adopt some of the Victorian Rules.

Australian rules football in Scotland began in Edinburgh in 1888 followed by Australian rules football in England in London, with some involvement in these countries in the following years. The game in the United Kingdom survived over the following century, though failed to grow due to established soccer and rugby codes.

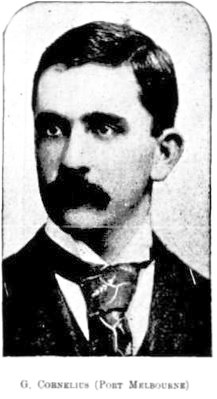
George Cornelius shocked the VFA in 1896 by leaving in his prime to become one of the most successful founders of organised Australian Football overseas

Australian rules football in South Africa began with the Witwatersrand Gold Rush bringing an influx of Australians to Johannesburg in 1886, and there were a large number of migrants across the goldfields of South Africa. A 1904 recollection of the Australian game in South Africa cites a book called "Martin's Australian Football Guide" that claims that on the goldfields early footballers of various nationalities would alternate between soccer, rugby and Australian rules, and this happened prior to the outbreak of the war, with Australians beating the other nationalities at their own games contributing to the impression that the Australian game was the more skillful of the codes. The Wanderers Football Club based at Old Wanderers in Johannesburg formed by Australian Association cricket members as an off-shoot in December 1896 was the first known club in the country. Among the early instigators of the game in Durban was George Cornelius in 1896 who left as Port Melbourne Football Club's youngest ever captain at age 20 and began organising and captaining matches there. Australia in 1906 decided not to send a team or promote the game. The sport there collapsed in 1909 as it failed to compete with the rising popularity of rugby and soccer.

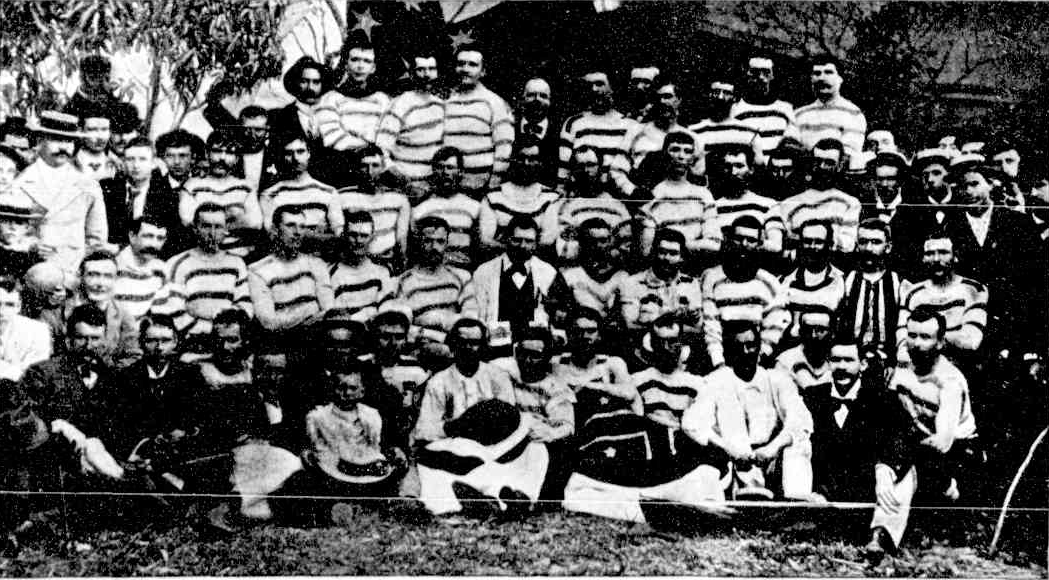
Australian Football teams in Durban, South Africa, 1900. The game survived there until 1914.

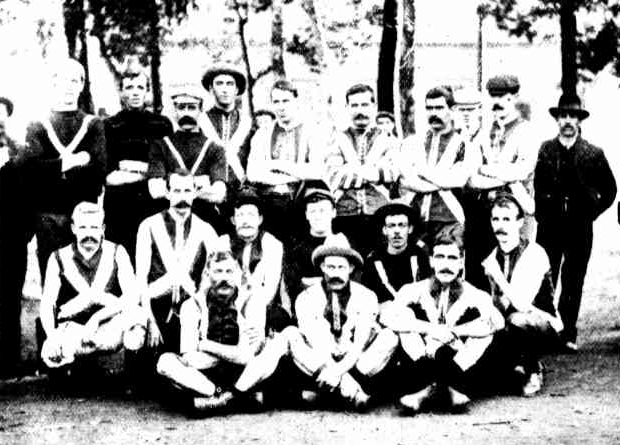
Pretoria Football Club. Pretoria South Africa, 1903

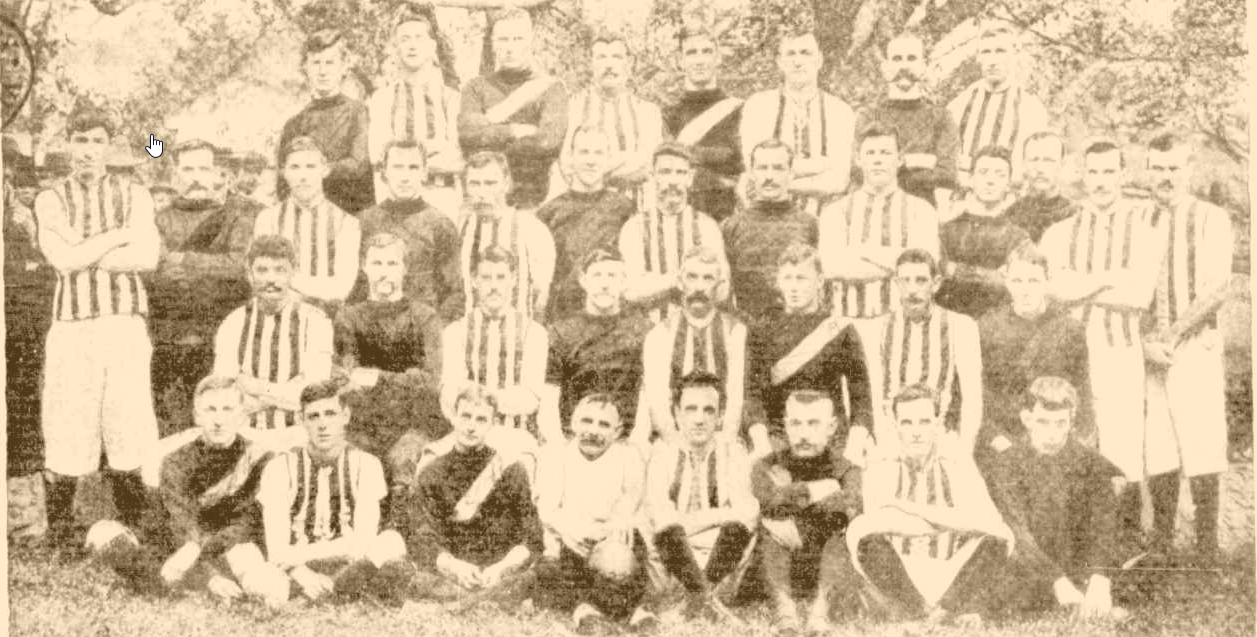
Natal and Transvaal colony teams. Durban, South Africa, 1904

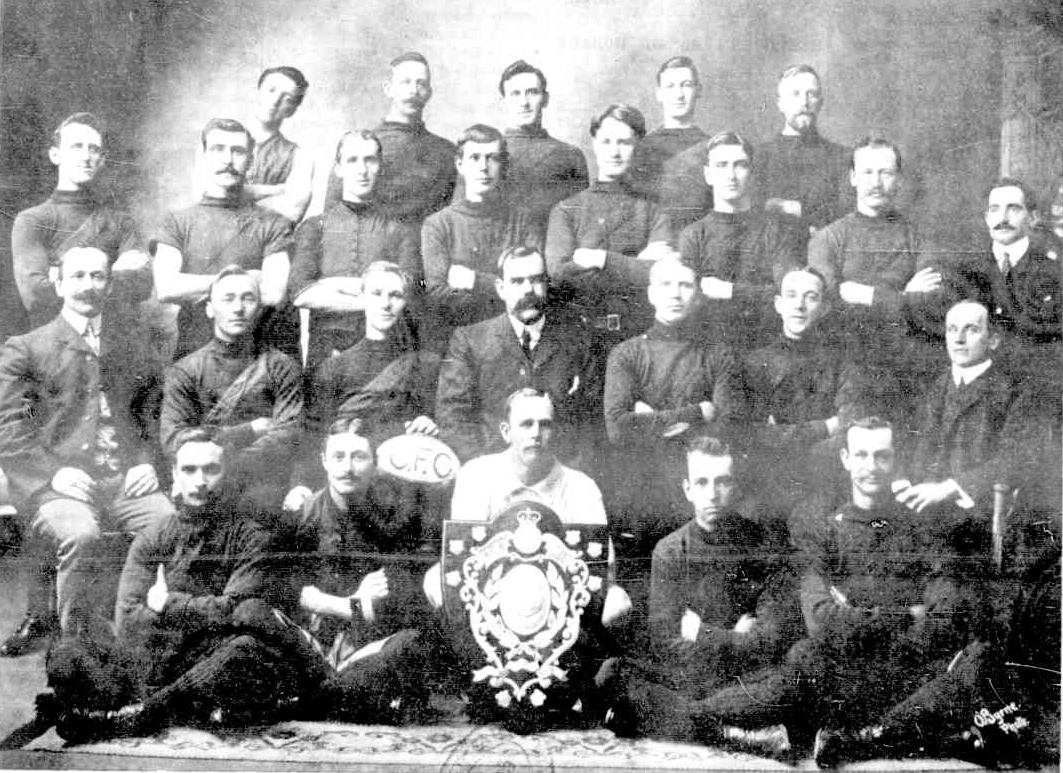
Commonwealth Football Club in Johannesburg, South Africa with the Elliot Shield 1905

Australian rules football in Canada began in British Columbia in 1905, when Canadian-born Captain Robert Nelson Davy of the 6th Regiment began training students of the 101st Canadian Cadet corps in preparation for a planned visit to Australia. Australia in 1914 decided not to send a team or promote the game and World War I is believed to have ended it.

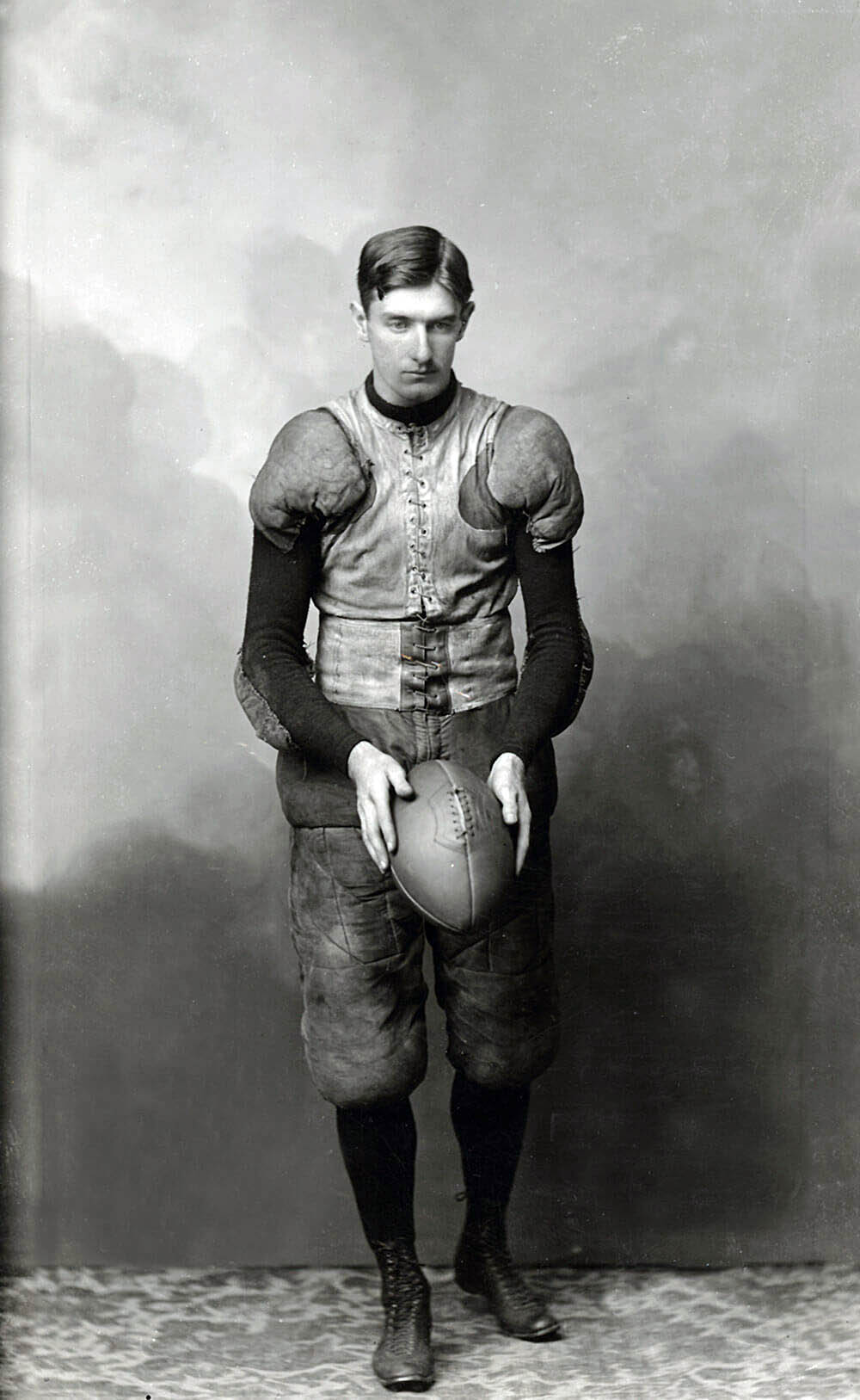
College Football Hall of Famer Pat O'Dea kickstarted the sport in the United States in 1906

Australian rules football in the United States began in Wisconsin in 1906 when Australian grid-iron punter Pat O'Dea along with his older brother and kicking mentor Andrew (of the Wisconsin University Athletic Club and its American Football coach) were able to attain a copy of the Victorian Football Association's rules (as this league was not affiliated with the AFC) and had begun training college students at the University of Wisconsin–Madison. By 1909 it had spread to schools in California, Illinois and Pennsylvania. Despite Australia refusing to send a team or promote the game, it persisted there until 1928.

==== The First World Governing Body and early international competition: 1906–1914 ====
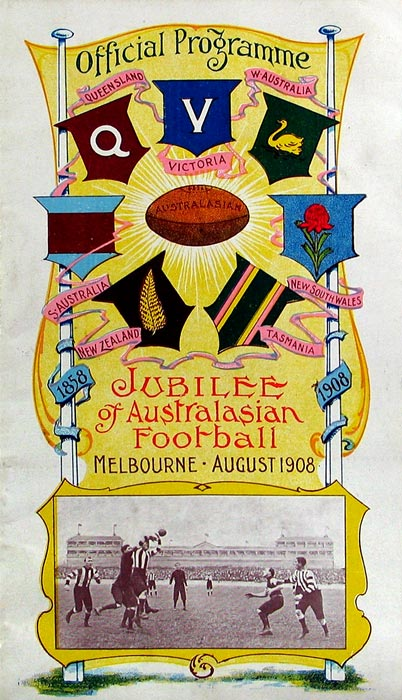
The silver fern announces New Zealand's admission to the 1908 Jubilee Carnival

In New Zealand, where proximity to Australia saw a formidable league, the sport quickly grew to a sizeable 115 clubs by the turn of the 20th century. As the game spread there, it became known as Australasian Football. In 1905, two representatives from the Colony of New Zealand (one from the North Island and one from the South) attended the Australasian Football Conference and became the first and only to be admitted from outside of Australia into the newly formed Australasian Football Council (AFC). The AFC was initially presided by Victorian interests, with the VFL's Con Hickey in charge. New Zealand never competed against Australia, though it successfully lobbied to send a side to the 1908 carnival held in Melbourne to celebrate 50 years of Australian Football, defeating both New South Wales and Queensland. Two years later, Australia's Victorian and South Australian representatives began a campaign to exclude the Dominion of New Zealand from representation on the council.

In 1906 delegates from newly formed clubs in South Africa requested a representative senior match against the VFL featuring players from clubs in Johannesburg, Pretoria and Durban, which the Victorian league replied it would consider, however the proposed match did not proceed. H C A Harrison expressed some regret at the AFC's decision to exclude South Africa from the 1908 Carnival.

The United States and Canada would compete against each other and against a Western Australian sponsored junior team between 1911 and 1912. While the tours were mostly successful, the AFC's refusal to sanction the tours caused significant stress to the fledgeling governing bodies of both countries. Nevertheless, growth of the code in the US was such that in 1914 it requested the Australasian Football Council send its a senior Australian team to tour, to which the AFC never responded.

Australian rules football in Japan began with a four high schools in Tokyo in 1910 While the AFC, the Western Australian sponsored tour to North America was also proposed to include Japan before it ran short of funds. It was short-lived in the country and believed to have lasted only until 1912. Japan also requested international matches in 1911.

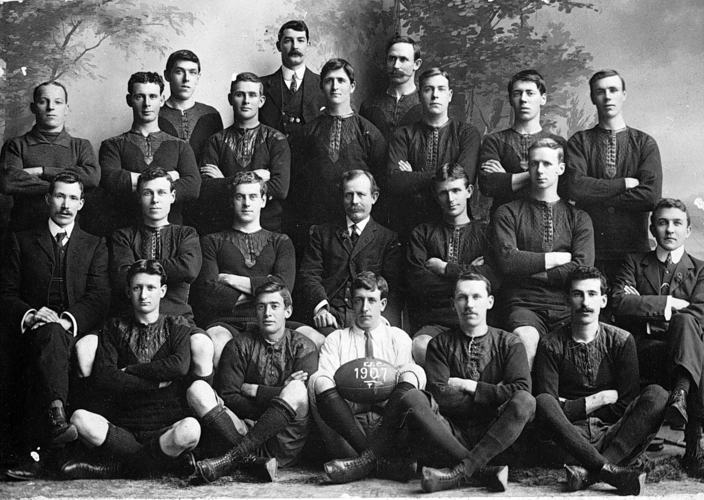
Eden Football Club in Auckland, New Zealand, 1907

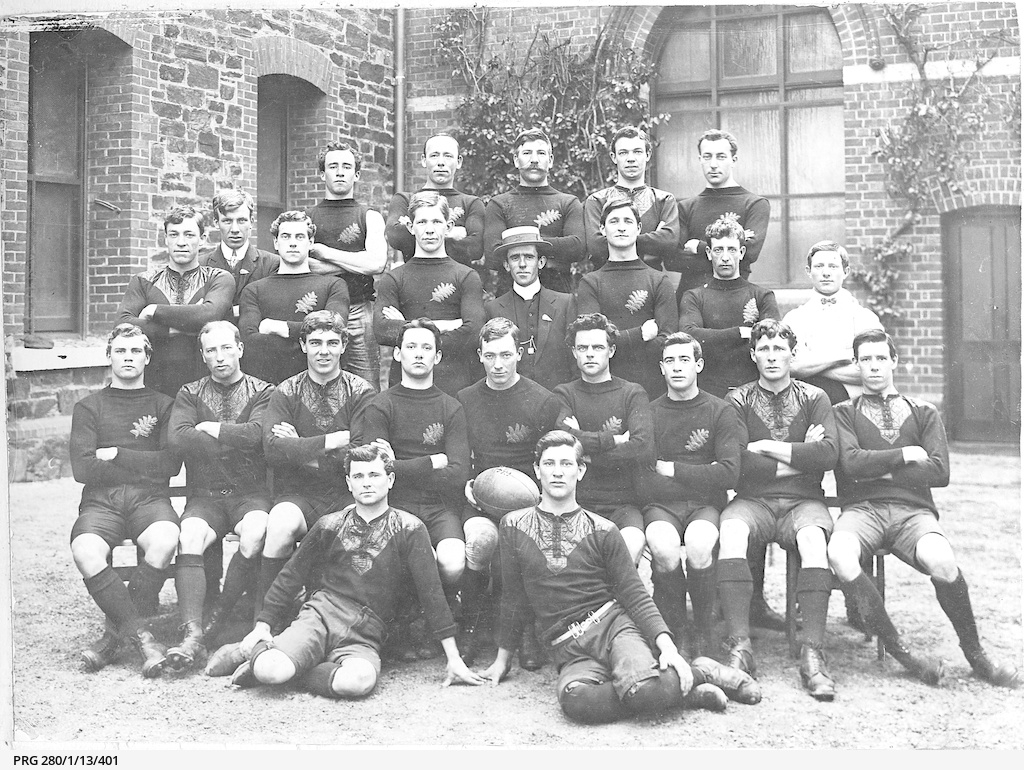
New Zealand's national team, 1908

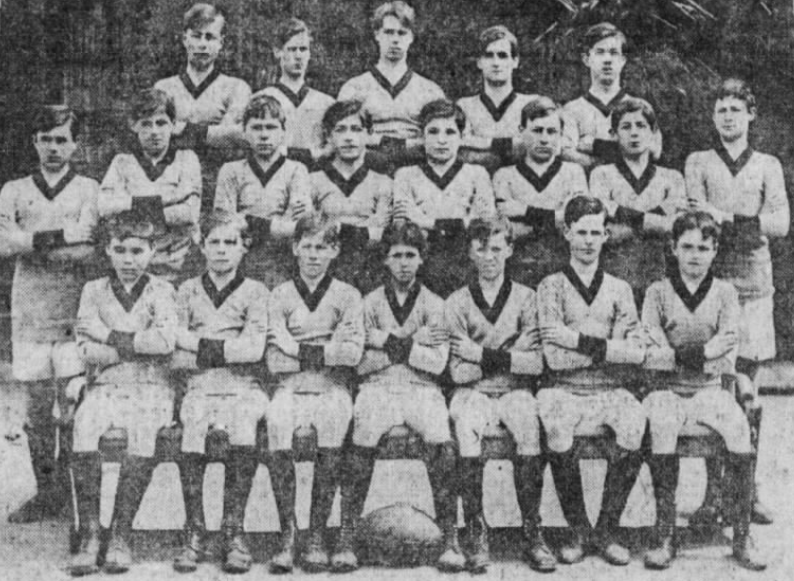
USA schoolboys team, 1909

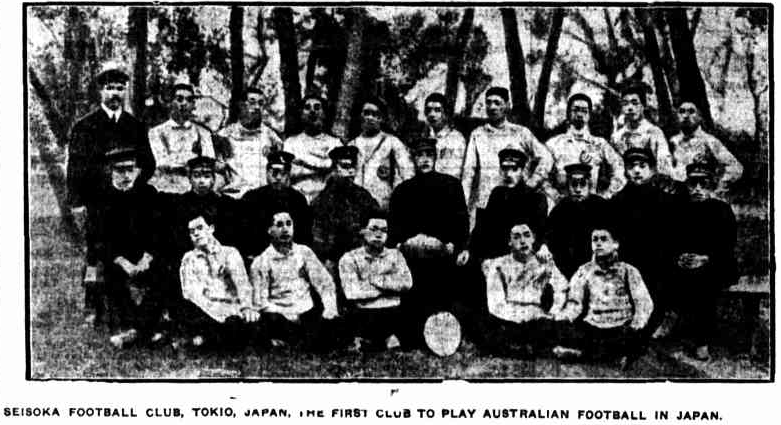
Seisoka Football Club, Tokio 1911, one of four Japanese teams regularly competing between 1909 and 1912.

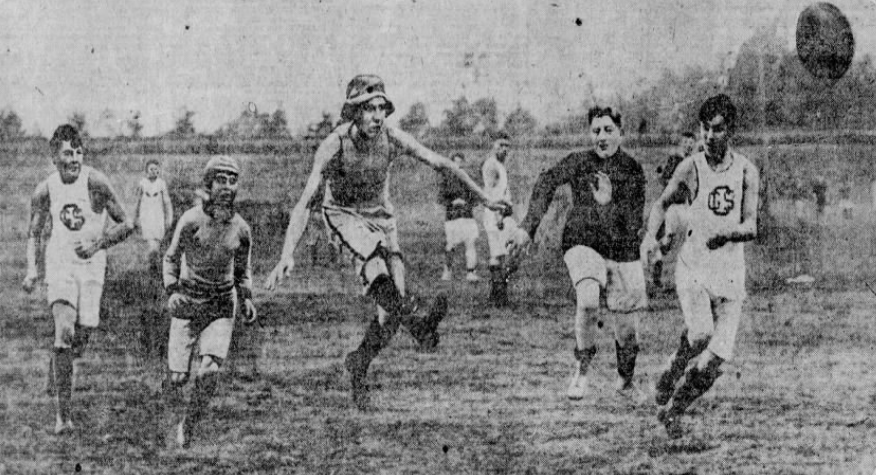
San Francisco public grammar schools football match. United States, 1910

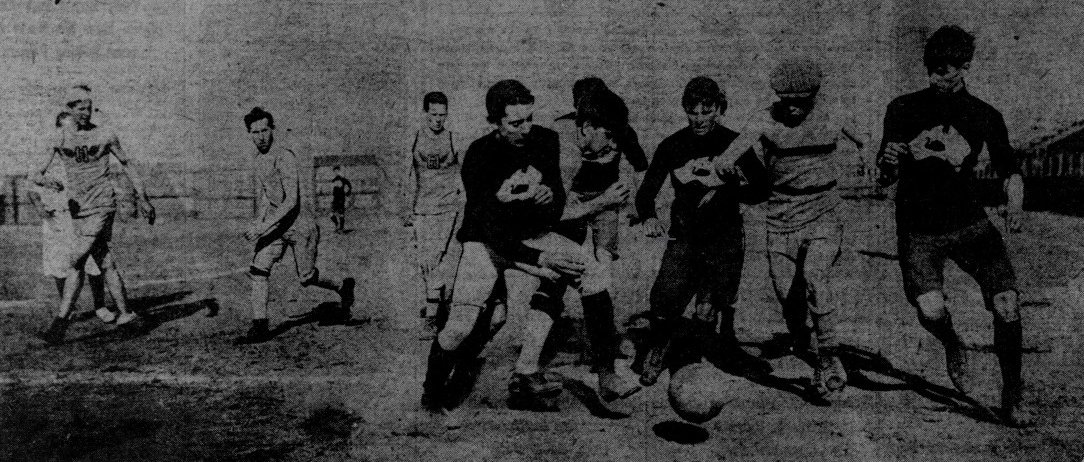
USA schoolboys vs Young Australia. Presidio of San Francisco, United States. 1 October 1911.

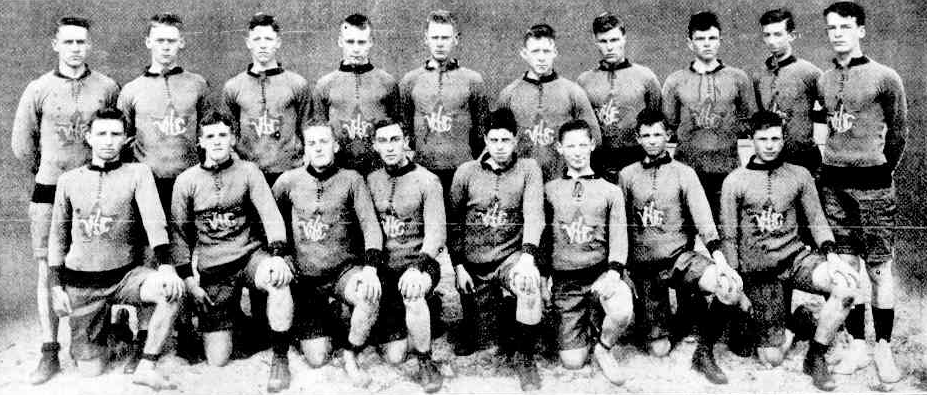
Canada's junior Australian Football Team in Vancouver, August 1912. The game survived there from 1905 to at least 1914.

===== Nationalist agenda of the VFL and AFC =====
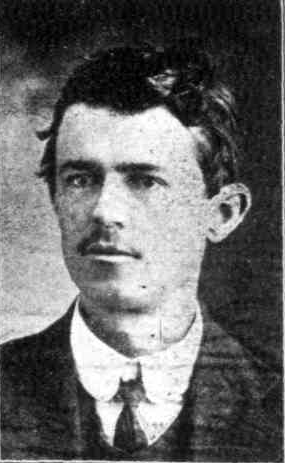
Jack Simons, a pioneering West Australian administrator, defied the AFC to oversee growth in juniors across Australia, the United States and Canada. Simons was scathing of the VFL's conflict of interest in putting profits before the growth of the game.

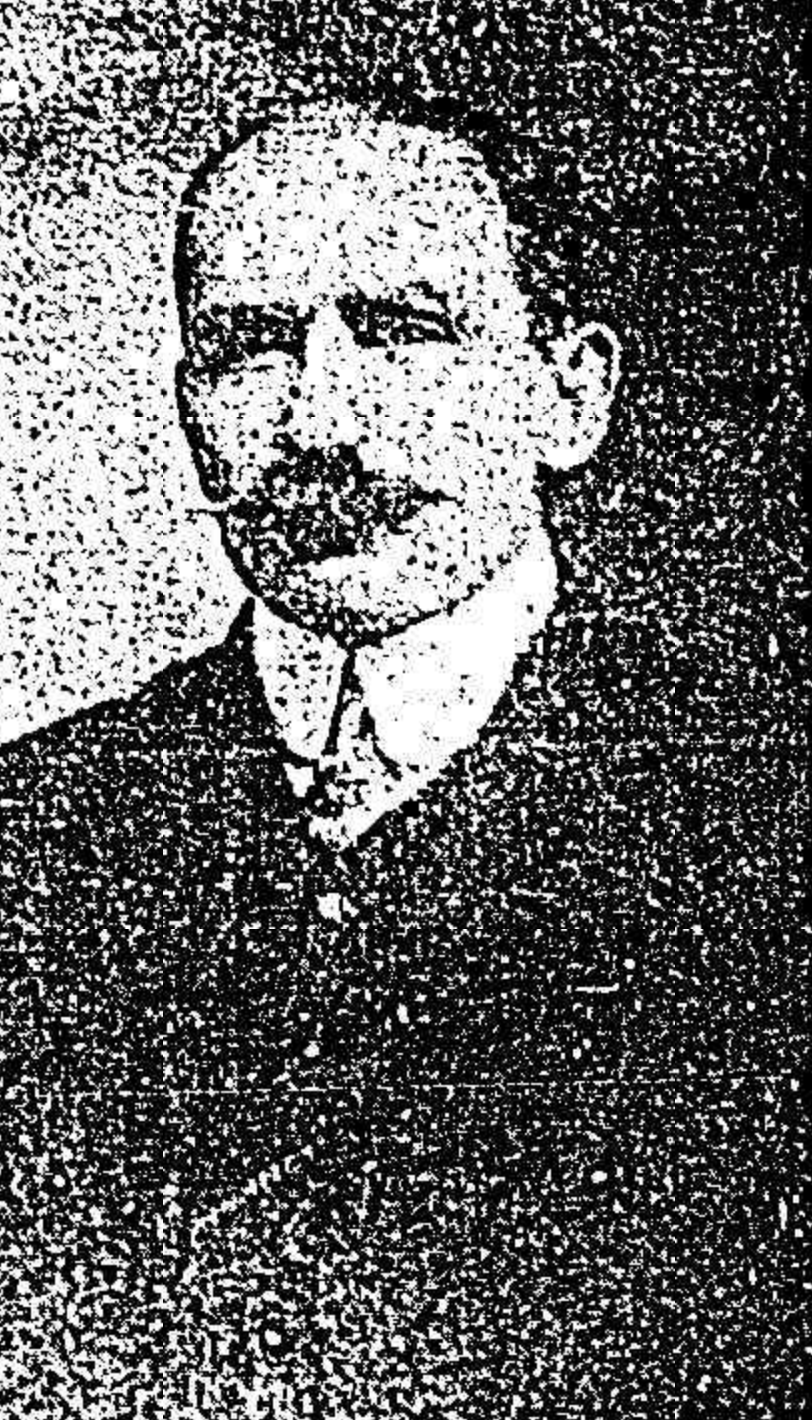
AFC president and VFL representative Con Hickey was obsessed with gaining marketshare in Sydney and was staunchly opposed to the game being played overseas, instead advocating for a [failed] merger with rugby league.

Post-Federation of the Australian colonies, the game's governing bodies became highly insular in their approach. In particular, until the middle of the century, the game's premier leagues, the newly formed and increasingly professional VFL (and to a lesser extent the South Australian league), were preferential in the support they provided to overseas competitions to those areas perceived to pose the least potential threat to their status. They had become staunchly opposed to the game's development in larger first world nations. Faced with the growth of British sports and their increasing professionalism in Australia and growing interest around the world in the Australian game the Australasian Football Council (led by the VFL) implemented a domestic policy for game development in 1906. The council's policy reflected the strong Australian nationalism of the time "one flag, one destiny, one football game" – that as the national code, all matches should be played under an Australian flag, with an Australian manufactured ball where possible on Australian soil, by the whole nation. The Victorian and South Australian delegates believed that they could better defend their premier status in Australia by allocating all its promotional resources to grow its marketshare in New South Wales and Queensland.While it allowed voting member New Zealand to send a team to the 1908 carnival, the policy meant no touring sides and the phasing out of financial support which stymied the game outside Australia creating significant financial and logistic barriers for overseas sides to compete. The nationalistic policies were reinforced by the 1908 Prime Ministerial speech of former player Alfred Deakin delivered at the opening of the 1908 carnival and would underpin the governing body's international policy for more than half a century.

In 1907, then AFC president Con Hickey declared that despite the game being played overseas the primary focus should be on inter-state competition and that there was no intention to "oust rugby" in places where it was growing in popularity. Despite rapid growth the council had, prior to 1907, allocated just 20% of its promotional budget for promote the game internationally (entirely to New Zealand), with the majority allocated domestically to New South Wales (50%) and Queensland (30%). The move would prove short-sighted as the promotional effect of the code switch of Dally Messenger, known for displaying spectacular Victorian Rules-like skill, proved a devastating blow and facilitated the rapid rise of Rugby league in New South Wales. Rugby league's rise there was followed by strong growth in Queensland and in New Zealand which helped push Australian Football further into obscurity. The VFL through Hickey had put many of its resources into brokering a deal with the rugby league authorities that would see it control the game across Australia. Coexistence with rugby and the promise of a universal football code was part of its ambition of keeping growth of the game in Australia under its national (and international) control. However, despite the backing of the AFC's New Zealand and New South Wales delegates who faced increasing competition from the rugby codes, and years of lobbying, the venture failed never gained acceptance from rugby league's governing bodies.

Following the 1908 Melbourne Carnival political tensions within the Australasian Football Council became heated with Victorian and South Australian delegates calling for all international initiatives to cease in order to put all available resources into New South Wales and Queensland to nationalise the game. By 1909, the first casualty of the AFC's policy was the once thriving South African competition. In 1911, the AFC withdrew all financial support to New Zealand which the delegate called a "death warrant for the sport" in the country and by 1913 all of the remaining players had switched to rugby. In 1913 following an unsanctioned North American tour from and to Australia, the AFC threatened to expel Western Australia unless it immediately stopped of its international initiatives. After years of supporting the game internationally, Western Australia finally complied, leaving the United States and Canada without support from Australia which resulted in Canada withdrawing from the sport. In 1914 a lengthy debate and 89 page report was commissioned to justify the council's move to expel New Zealand which was passed. With the motion passed and the last remaining international support withdrawn, the council removed the reference to Australasia. While the sport continued in the United States after World War I, the AFC's withdraw of support ensured that it eventually died there also.

==== Between the Wars: Decline and hiatus:1914–1945 ====
World War I saw the game being played by Australian servicemen around the world, particularly in Egypt, and in Europe in France, Belgium, and England. In 1914, H C A Harrison reported that the game was being played regularly at both Oxford and Cambridge universities, though records of matches prior to it becoming an annual event in 1921 are scant.

It is generally believed that international interest and support for Australian rules football died following World War I, though there is evidence of a small continuous supporter base spanning several decades and that the administrators of the game, at least in Victoria, showed little interest in promoting the sport overseas. By 1920, it was obvious to Australian observers that the game in outside Australia was struggling, with rugby league commentators in Sydney gloating that the Australian code had all but died in South Africa and New Zealand, while the rugby codes in contrast, through strong assistance from Britain, were now thriving.

Nauru after the war had already become established as by far the preferred sport with thriving senior and junior local competitions.

International competition in the sport became non-existent for three quarters of the 20th century. The return of many Australian expatriates from overseas gold fields and tours of duty, combined with Australia's low profile on the world stage, offered few opportunities for the game to grow during this time. With the withdrawal of its New Zealand delegates, the sport returned to the title of Australian Football, governed by the Australian Football Council. Concerned primarily with the growth of their own domestic competitions, the Australian leagues and governing bodies made little effort to develop or promote the game until the 1950s, and the council's role was mainly to oversee the growing importance of interstate test matches.

Nevertheless, the longest running fixture outside of Australia, the annual Varsity match between Oxford and Cambridge in England, has been held annually since 1921, and has emerged into a fierce rivalry, worthy of half-blue status at Oxford. Apart from this match, however the game was rarely played in England.

Even in his later years H C A Harrison retained an interest in the game growing internationally and was genuinely surprised in 1927 to learn that a very similar game was rapidly growing in popularity in Ireland.

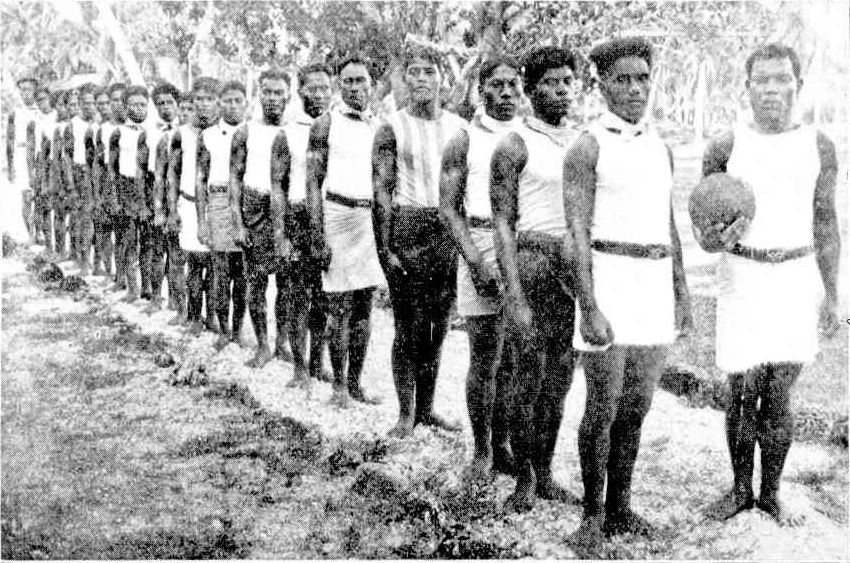
Police team lining up for a football match at Nauru in 1916. The game there received continued support from Australia.

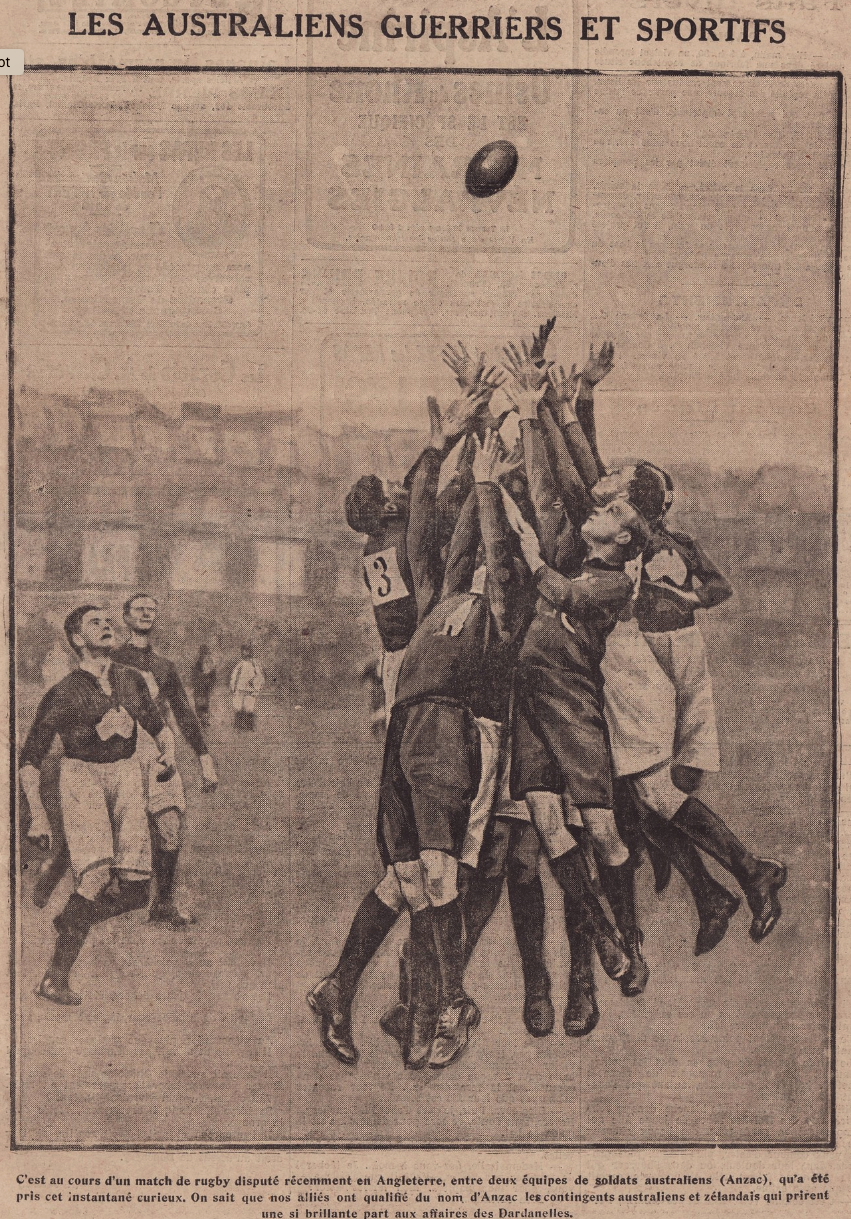
Action from the Pioneer Exhibition Game in London.
(From Excelsior, 20 November 1916.)

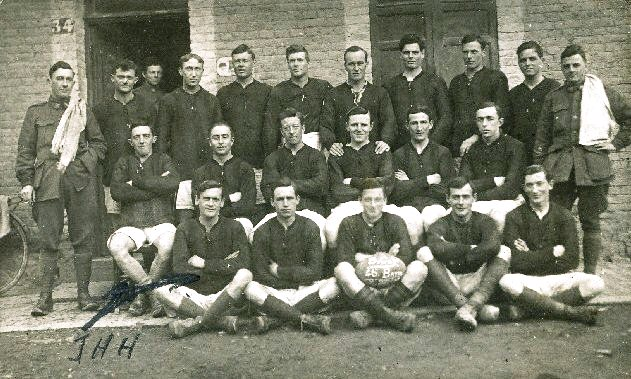
Photo from the first game in France in 1916

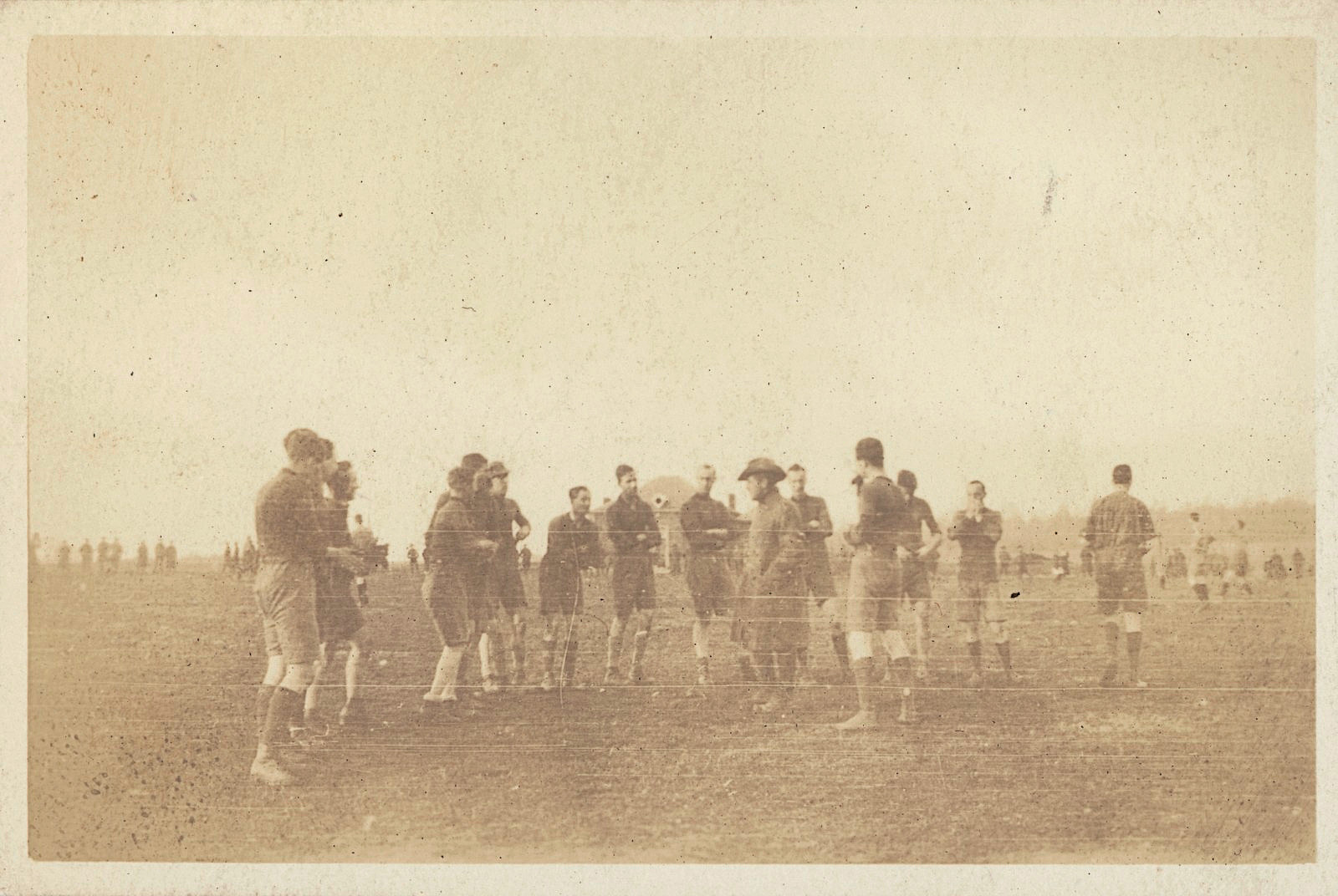
Match played on the Western Front during World War 1 in 1918 H85.55/160/88 State Library Victoria

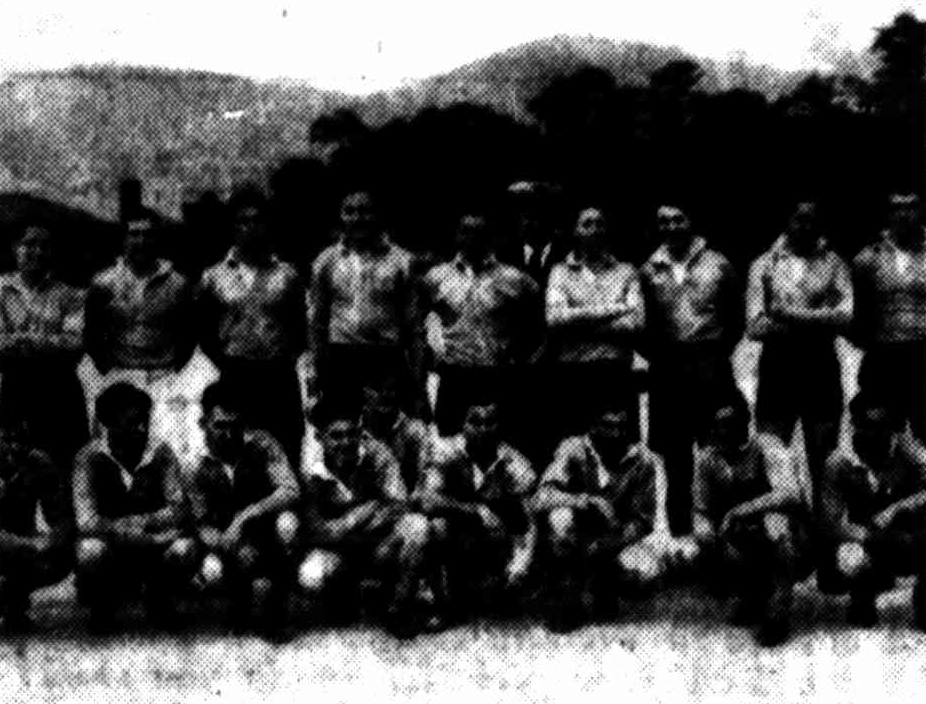
HMAS Hobart Australian rules football team assemble for a match in Kure, Hiroshima Japan in 1946

==== Postwar Revival: 1946–1969 ====
Australian Football was also introduced to the Territory of New Guinea in 1944 and the Territory of Papua in 1948.

World War II saw some servicemen play the game overseas, particularly in Malaysia, Indonesia, Egypt, and Algeria. During the Vietnam War, matches were even played by servicemen against the local Vietnamese.

In the 1960s, Australian leagues began to show some interest in expansion of the game outside of Australia. 1963 saw the first Australian rules football exhibition matches played in the United States. Australian state leagues began occasionally promoting themselves in this way over the following decades.

Since 1967, there have been many matches between Australian and Irish teams, under various sets of hybrid, compromise rules. In 1984, the first official representative matches of International rules football were played, and these games have continued to be played annually each October, now attracting considerable public interest, drawing sizeable crowds, and receiving regular television coverage. New Zealand resumed a local competition in 1974.

The first full international test played between the national sides of Papua New Guinea and Nauru in front of a crowd of over 10,000 at Sir Hubert Murray Stadium in Port Moresby was won by PNG by 129 points. This was followed by the first ever full international match involving Australia was played in 1977 at under 17 level against Papua New Guinea in Adelaide, with Australia taking the honours.

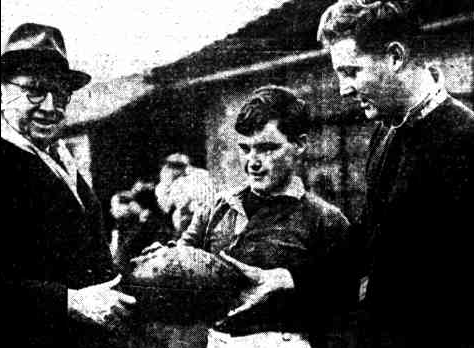
Australia's High Commissioner in London with the captains of the Oxford and Cambridge teams for their Annual Varsity match (contested since 1911) in 1949

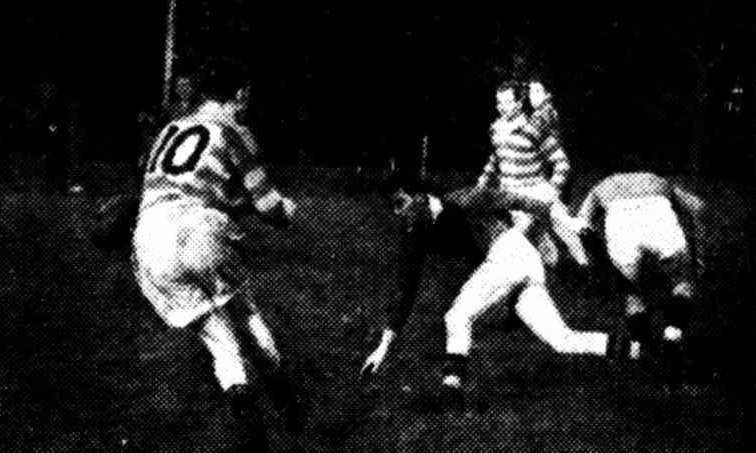
HMAS Vengeance and the "Wombats" (in the stripes) at Old Deer Park, London in 1952

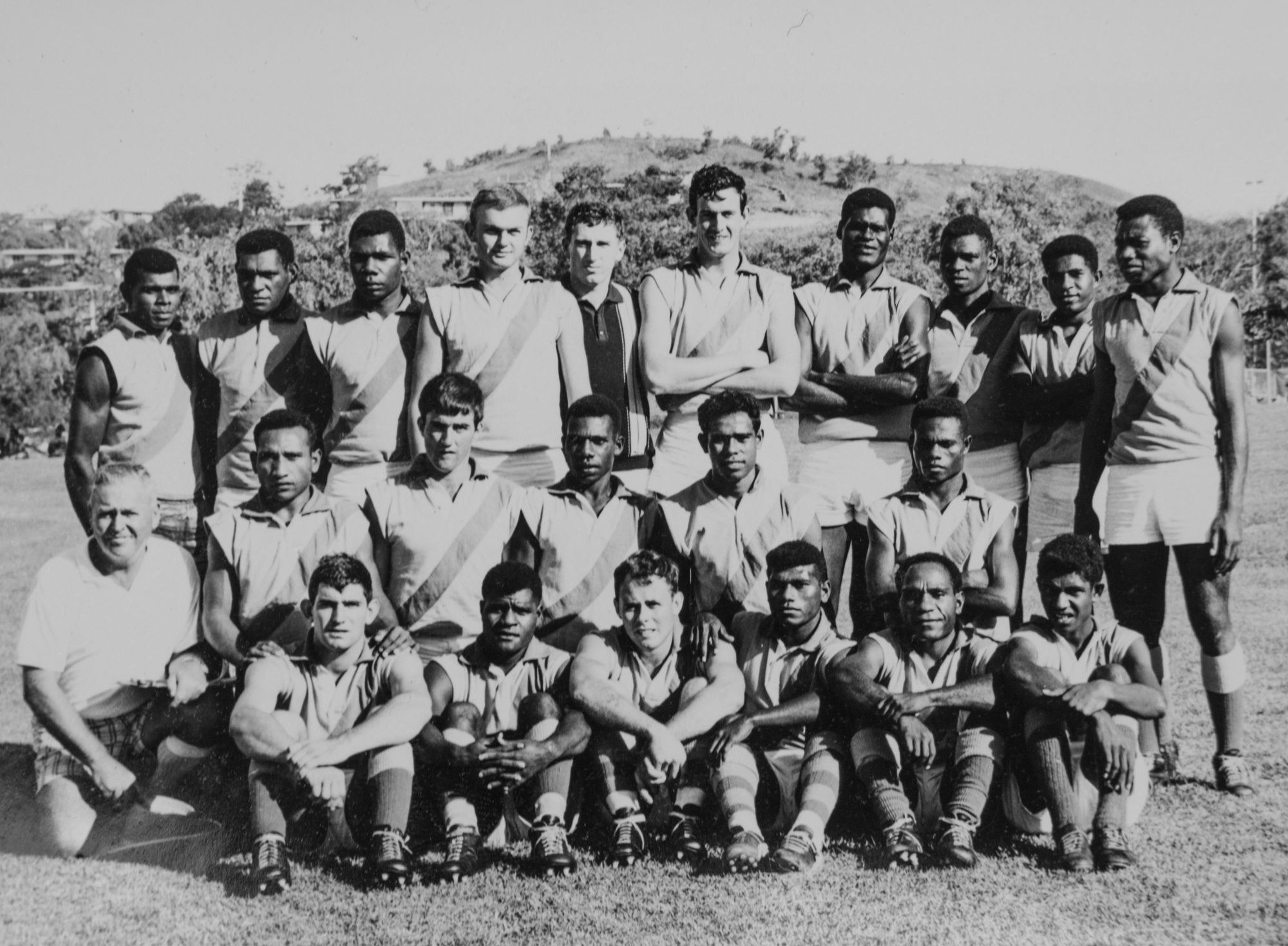
Army Australia Rules Team Port Moresby 1968

==== Revival in Oceania:1970–1980 ====
In the late 1980s, successful VFL exhibition matches attracted large crowds and spawned fledgling local competitions in both Japan and Canada. The Australian media showed only a token interest in the matches in London and Japan involving VFL clubs. It was during this decade that the sport was first televised in North America and the United Kingdom.

Some nationalities respond well to less formal means, however, and many trends in sporting activities are achieved outside formally organised programs. For instance, although Australian football was not formally established in Tonga until 2003 however informal matches had been introduced to schools as early as 1985.

==== Game spreads ====
The largest barriers to growth of Australian Football internationally have traditionally been distance, field availability, and player numbers. With a total of 36 players normally required for a game, and a cricket sized oval, organising games can be difficult in countries where space is a premium and devotees are spread widely. While these factors have not been a problem in Papua New Guinea or New Zealand, they did pose large problems to leagues in Europe, Asia, and the Americas. This disadvantage has been turned into an advantage with some organisers accepting modified versions of the game, such as nine-a-side, requiring fewer players and less space.

In the late 1980s, as organisers adapted, amateur leagues were established in Japan (1987), England, Denmark, and Canada (1989). In the case of Japan and Canada, these were directly sparked by VFL exhibition matches.

In the 1990s, the Australian diaspora had spread and amateur competition had grown in countries such as Sweden (1993), Germany (1995), the USA (1996), Argentina, Spain, Samoa (1997), and South Africa (1998), as well as a number of mainly expatriate teams, mainly based in South East Asia.

In 1993, interest in South Africa increased to the point where plans were made for powerful WAFL club Subiaco and Norwood from the SANFL to play two games in Johannesburg in 1994.

During this time, the VFL expanded to become the AFL and began to command a greater national and international audience. Word of the sport grew out of AFL exhibition matches, cult television followings, and Internet communication. North American fans formed an organisation, AFANA, specifically to work for improved media coverage of Australian Football.

The traditionalists in the governing bodies of Australia (which became the AFL) were reluctant to sanction any games which were not played exactly according to the Laws of the Game, and the AFL initially did not recognise leagues that played the game on fields that did not closely match the proper dimensions, or had less than 16 players per side. Since the 1990s, these attitudes have changed somewhat, and the AFL and other development bodies have directly contributed to the development of the game overseas.

==== New world governing body and international matches: 1995–2002 ====
The International Australian Football Council (IAFC) was formed after football first featured at the Arafura Games in 1995. Since 1998, the Barassi International Australian Football Youth Tournament, endorsed by the AFL as part of its International Policy, has hosted several junior teams from other countries.

Since 2000, fledgling competitions have been established in countries such as Ireland (2000), Tonga (2002), Scotland, France, and China (2005). Television and the internet have since helped to increase the awareness of the game outside of Australia.

Inspired by successful Arafura Games competitions, the inaugural Australian Football International Cup was held in Melbourne in 2002, an initiative of the IAFC and the AFL. The first International Cup also marked the beginnings of a very small media interest in the international aspects of the game in Australia.

At the 2002 International Cup, meetings held between the AFL, IAFC, and international teams saw a unanimous vote amongst member countries that the AFL become the de facto world governing body for the sport, with the leagues linked to the teams affiliating with the AFL. The IAFC's public relations officer, Brian Clarke, disputed this move and continued the organisation in name. This organisation was finally dissolved in 2005, dropping all public claims to being the world governing body for the sport and being replaced by the development organisation Aussie Rules International.

==== Boom in North America, Oceania and Asia: 2002–2010 ====
In recent years, the game has grown particularly strongly in Papua New Guinea and New Zealand.

In 2004, a volunteer group known as World Footy News began documenting the growth of Australian football internationally through their website, becoming a major source of international football news, and for the first time providing a source of detailed coverage for the International Cups (2005 and 2008). Its website states that it "was created to foster awareness of Australian Football around the globe and to aid communication between clubs, leagues and individuals playing and supporting Aussie Rules". At various times between 2004 and 2007, other regularly updated sources included OziRulzGlobal, Fourth Quarter, and with slowly improving quantity, an International Leagues section of the AFL website.

In 2005, after eight years of growing domestic competition, the South African government declared Australian Football to be the sport for "the new South Africa", injecting government funding into the sport.

In 2006, Pakistan, Indonesia, Catalonia, Croatia, Norway, Bermuda and East Timor joined the list of playing nations.

On 3 July 2006, the AFL announced that it had formed an International Development Committee to support overseas leagues. The AFL hopes to develop the game in other countries to the point where Australian football is played at an international level by top-quality sides from around the world. The AFL plans to host the International Cup regularly every three or four years, beginning in 2008, the 150th anniversary of the code. Following the AFL's interest in the internationalisation of the game, coverage in the Australian media grew substantially.

On 14 April 2007, the Australian Institute of Sport Under 17 squad competed against the South African national Australian rules football team in the first international match between the two countries at North West Cricket Stadium in Potchefstroom, South Africa. The Australians won by a score of 162–12. In the same month, a massive junior program called "FootyWILD", similar to Auskick, was launched in the country.

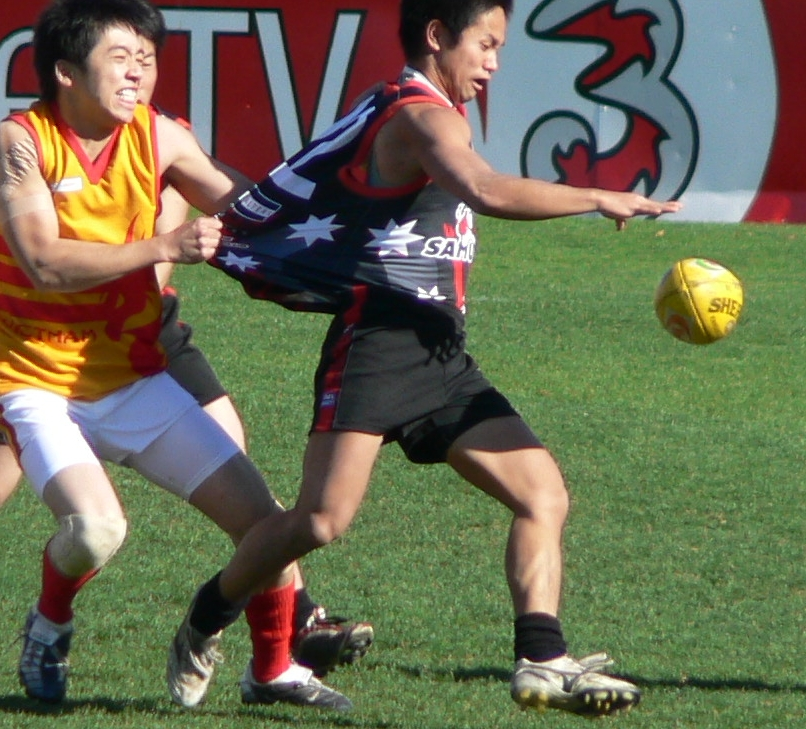
Japan Samurai captain Michito Sakaki being tackled by a Vietnamese opponent in 2006

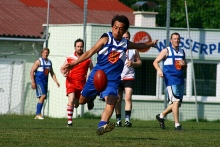
Action from a CEAFL match between Austria and Finland in 2007

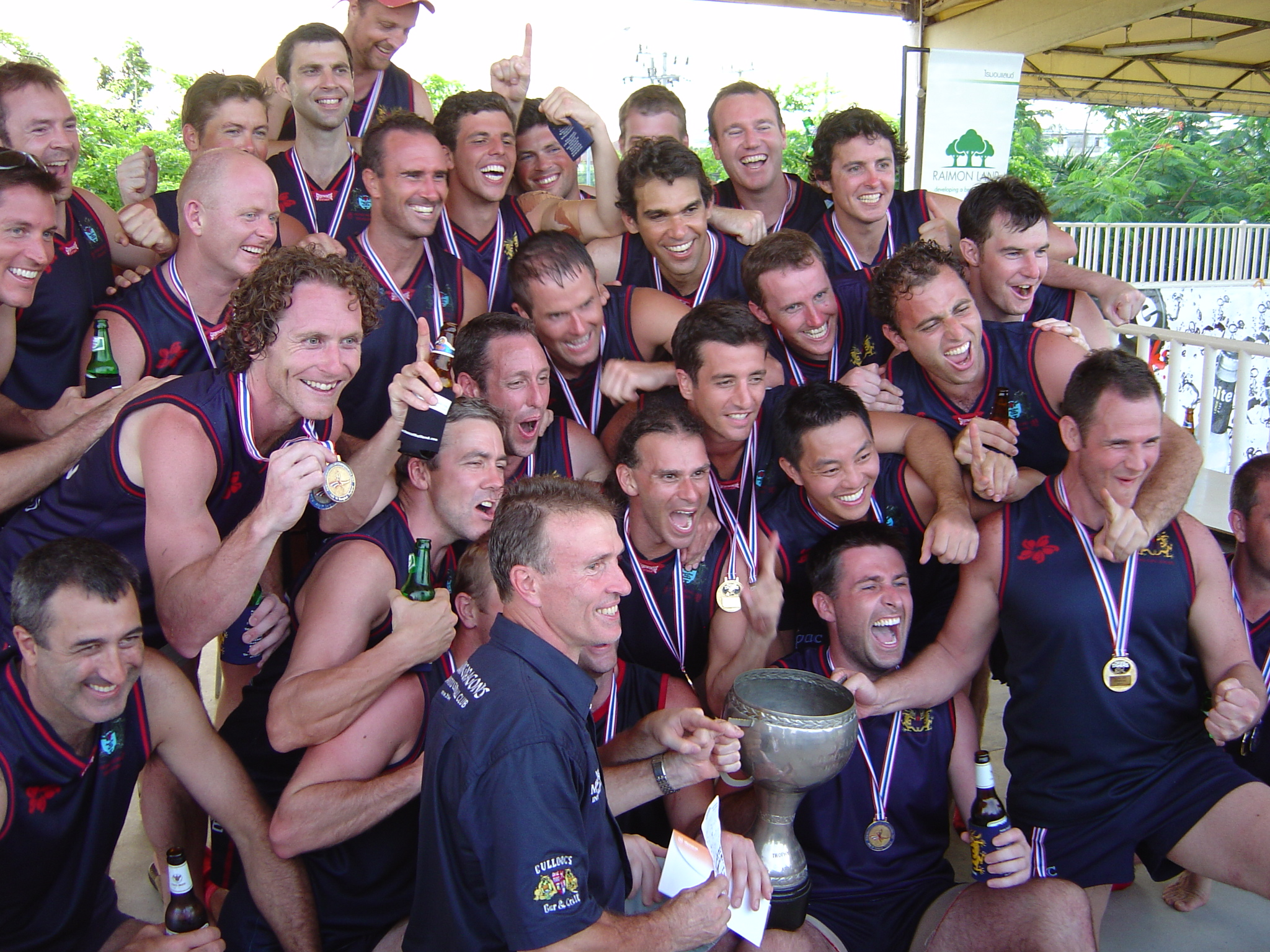
Hong Kong Dragons winners of the 2007 Asian Australian Football Championships in Bangkok, Thailand

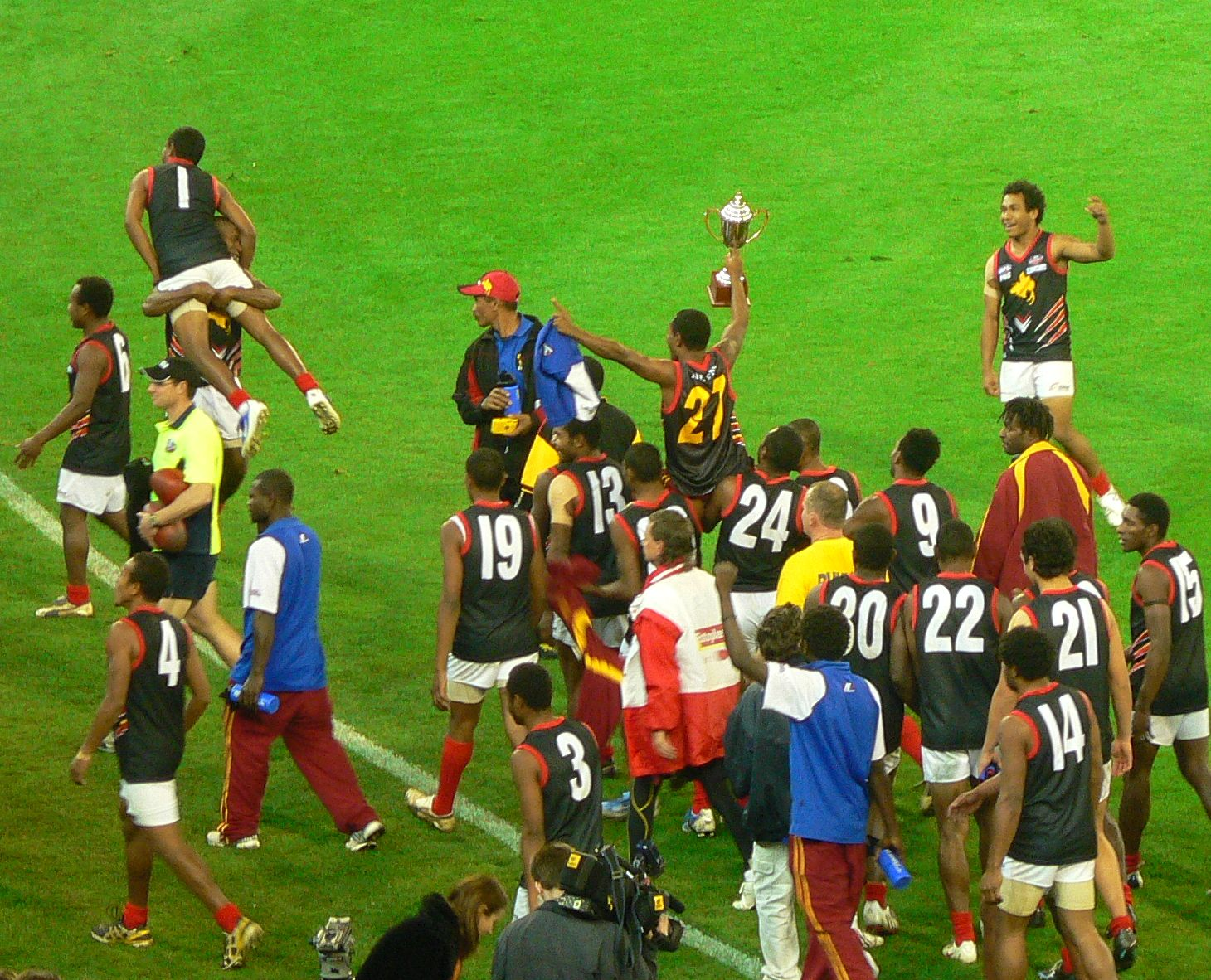
Papua New Guinea celebrates its International Cup win in 2008

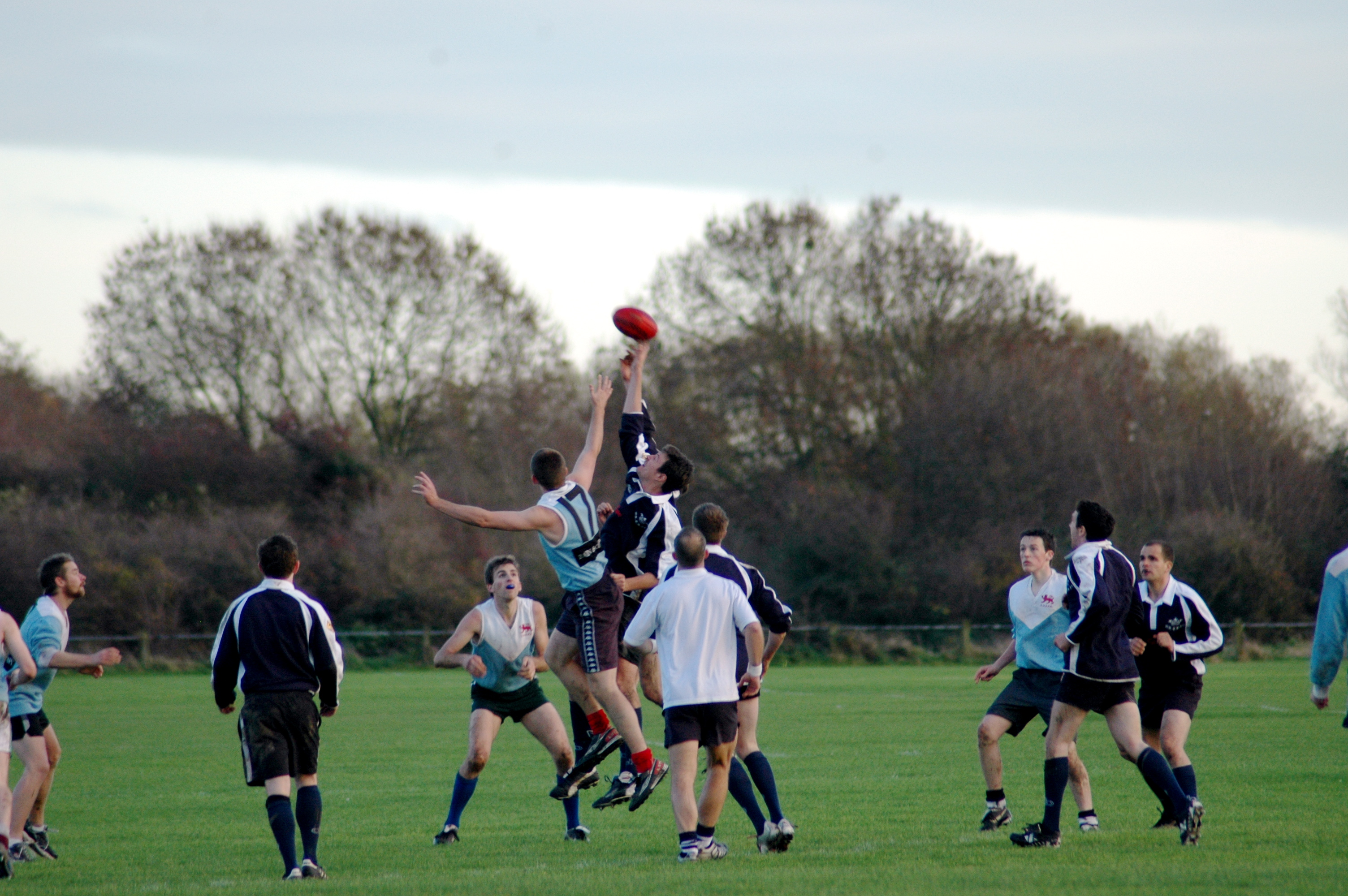
Oxford vs Cambridge in 2008

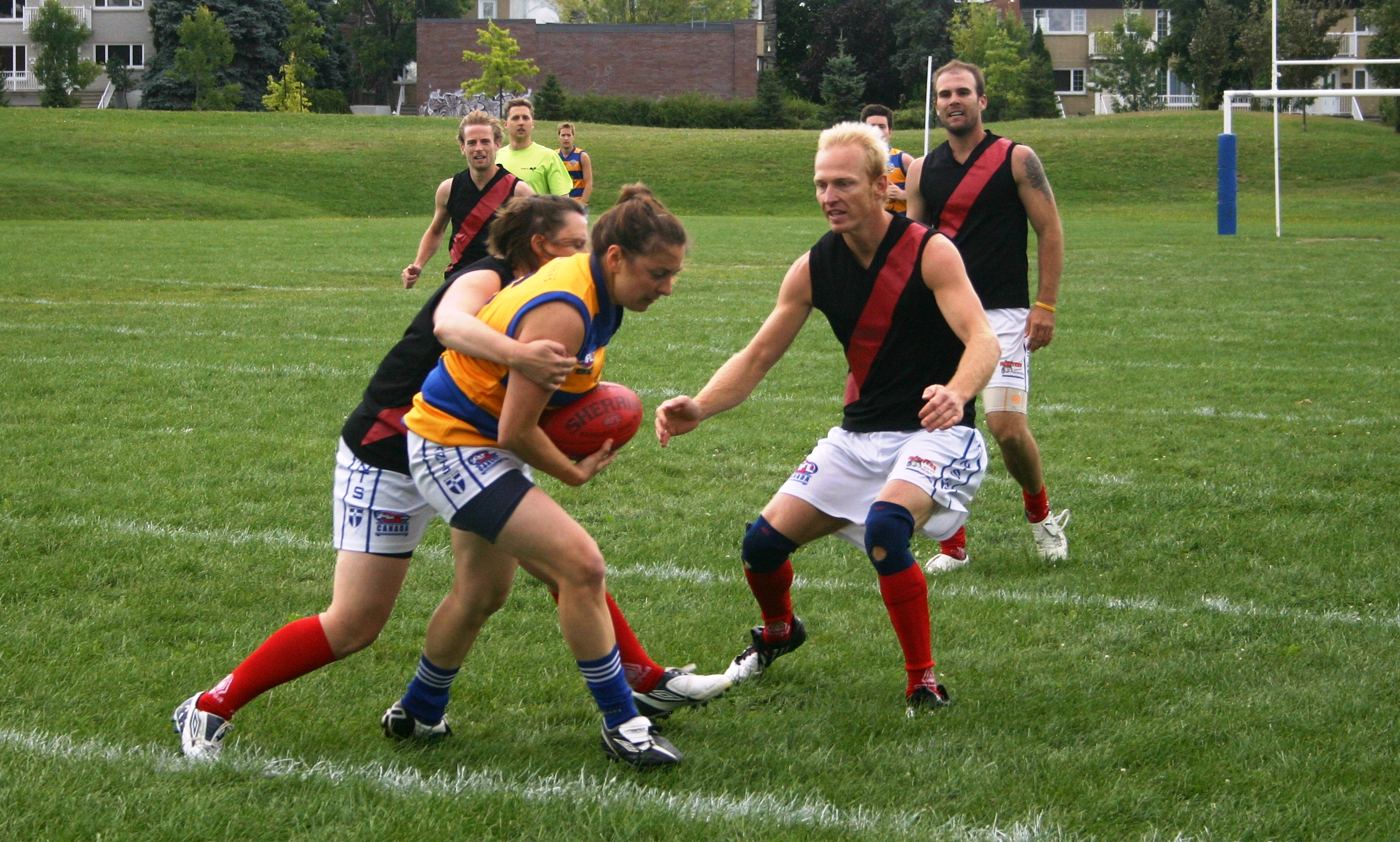
Action from the 2010 ECAFL Grand Final in Quebec, Canada

=== AFL matches in Asia, New Zealand and growth in the Indian subcontinent: 2010–Present ===
The AFL in the late 2000s and early 2010s began a significant overseas push in an effort to boost the value of its international television rights.

The AFL's first target was one of the fastest growing and wealthiest per capita television markets in the world, and home to the world's busiest airport by international passenger traffic – the United Arab Emirates. The AFL began a grassroots push there beginning with a NAB Cup exhibition match in Dubai and promoted a 9-a-side competition there. Interest in the game there however was short-lived and the local competition died out around 2010. However the promotion of the game there has benefited the league through Sport24 broadcasting it on international flights.

The second biggest television market in the world – China was the league's next major target. It invested in an exhibition match in Shanghai in 2010, and followed up with an AFL academy in 2011. Australian interests followed up with the construction of a dedicated AFL oval in Tianjin in 2011. The AFL Commission designed AFLX in 2017 as a means to promote the sport in China. It scheduled a series of AFL Premiership matches was played at Jiangwan Stadium from 2017 to 2019, the first outside of Pacific, which attracted an average attendance of 10,073. However the AFL abandoned the program during the COVID pandemic and the Tianjin Oval became derelict. No athletes signed to the country's high performance program made it into the AFL. However the AFL was able to secure a broadcast partner and attracted a Chinese audience of 5.67 million viewers. Star Sports now broadcasts AFL in mainland China.

The AFL began a program in New Zealand seeking an increasing its pay television broadcast deal with Sky Sport. On 25 April 2013, the first premiership match outside of Australia was held at Westpac Stadium in Wellington, New Zealand, between the Sydney Swans and the St Kilda Saints, and attracted a crowd of over 22,000 spectators. As part of its New Zealand push the AFL began a direct talent pathway to the St Kilda Football Club and shifted its national academy matches from South Africa to New Zealand and established a New Zealand Combine. The AFL's New Zealand campaign was largely unsuccessful, with crowds and television audiences dwindling for the league's matches, moderate growth in participation and athletes signed to the country's high performance program choosing to play professional rugby football instead. Unsatisfied with matches being based in the less populated centre of Wellington the AFL has unsuccessfully lobbied for development of an AFL standard oval stadium in its largest city Auckland. However Auckland has continued to invest in rectangular stadiums due to the increasing popularity of rugby football and soccer there. The AFL scrapped matches in New Zealand in 2015 and dropped its talent pathway campaign in 2019. Despite this, one New Zealand athlete, Mykelti Lefau, eventually made an AFL debut in 2024.

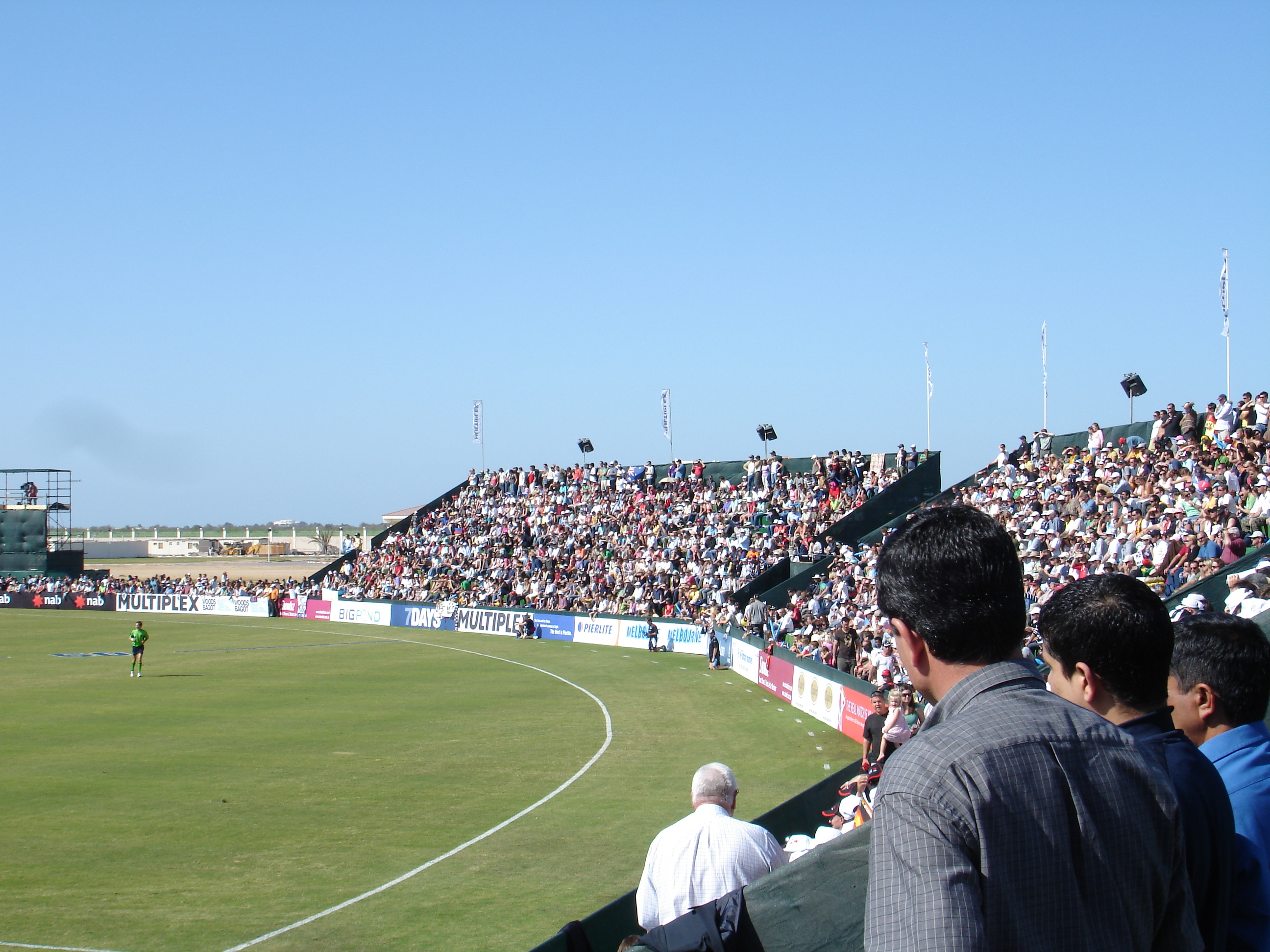
2008 NAB Cup match between Collingwood and Adelaide at Ghantoot Racing and Polo Club, Abu Dhabi, UAE.

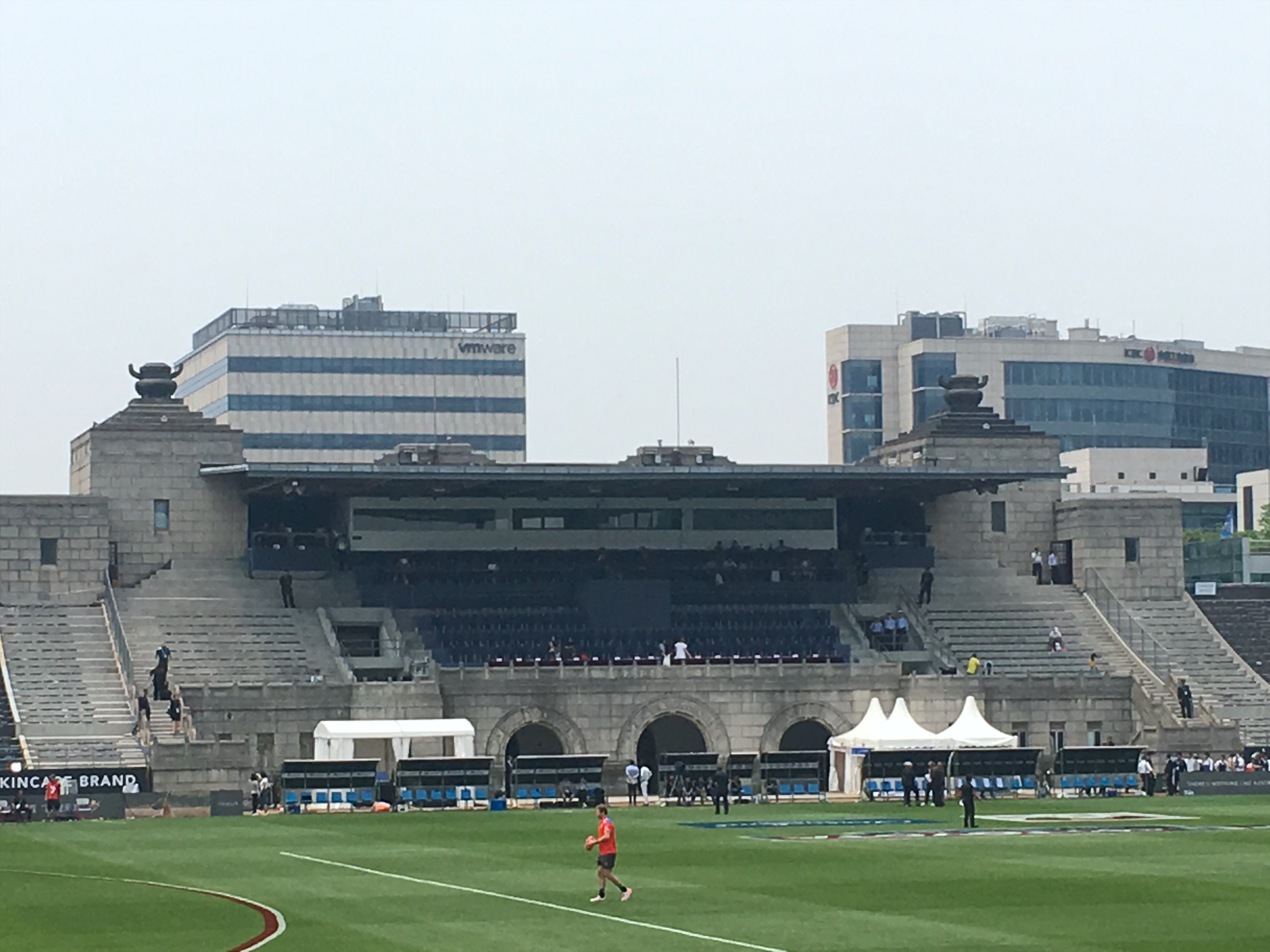
Jiangwan Stadium the venue for the first Australian Football League matches played in China in 2010

In the Indian Subcontinent, the game there has boomed since 2010 due mainly to members of the Australia national cricket team who are major celebrities there, promoting it. Steve Waugh, Ricky Ponting and Shane Warne have all played a role in promoting its growth. Several of the television networks now support increasing AFL viewership. At the grassroots, the sport became firmly established in India in 2010, Pakistan in 2014 and Sri Lanka in 2016 with each of these countries since featuring in international tournaments. Participation exploded and within a decade the region's player base grew to more than 10,000 players, however no player pathway from the grassroots to the AFL exists. In 2017, an amateur match in India attracted over 6,000 spectators. Another amateur match in Odisha, India in 2018 attracted a crowd of over 20,000, the third largest outside of Australia and larger than any AFL match hosted overseas since 1987. With the cancellation of the AFL's International Cup, Pakistan has boosted AFL Asia's Asian Australian Football Championships winning Division 3 on debut.

== International competition ==
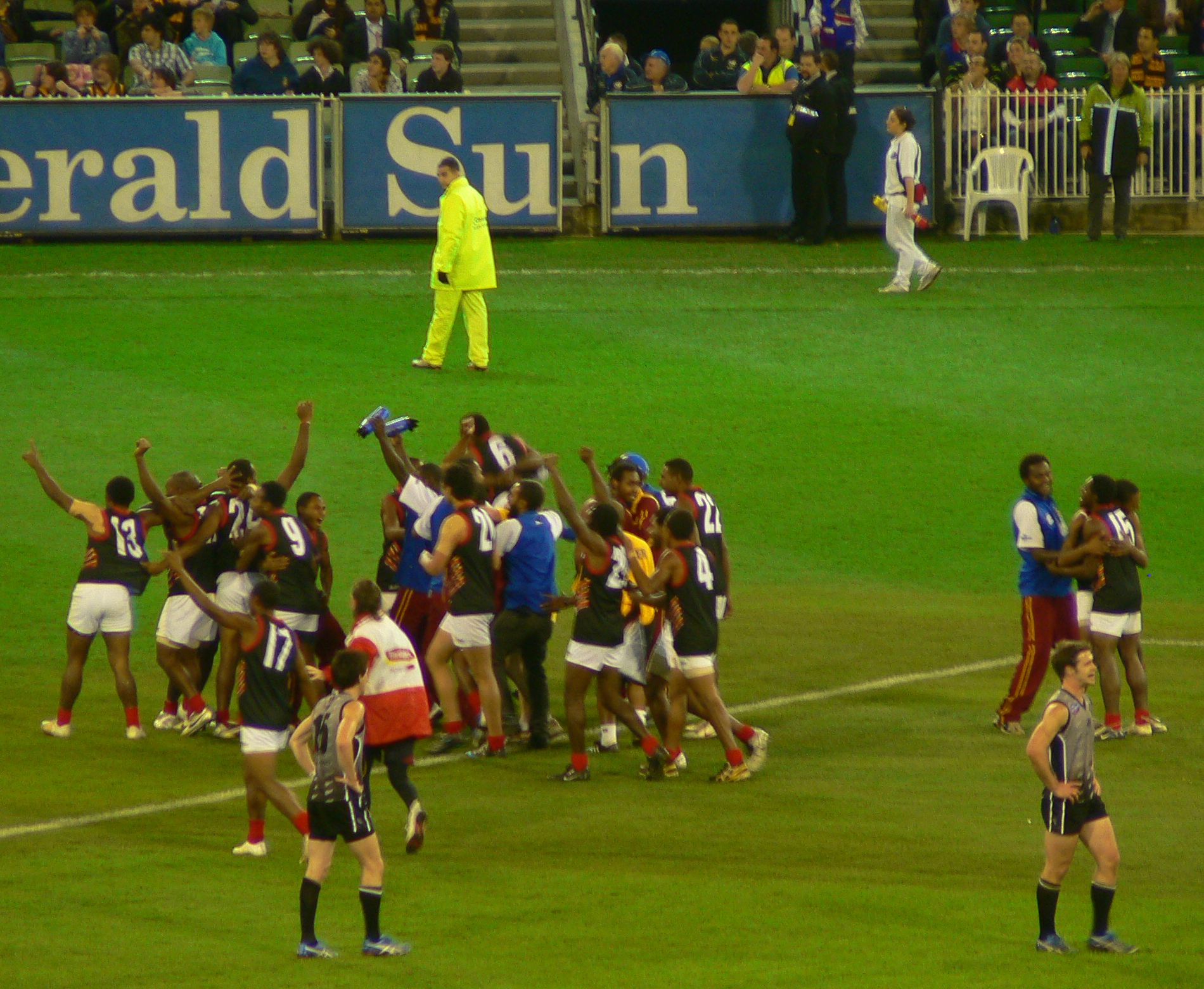
Scenes after the siren at the Melbourne Cricket Ground as Papua New Guinea narrowly defeat New Zealand

The first truly international competitor in Australian Football was New Zealand. In 1908, the Jubilee Australasian Football Carnival was held to celebrate the 50th anniversary of Australian rules football. New Zealand (then representing a total of 115 clubs) defeated both New South Wales and Queensland in the carnival, but lost to Victoria and Tasmania.

The 1995 Arafura Games, held in Darwin, Northern Territory, Australia became the first international sporting event to have Australian football as a competition sport, rather than a demonstration sport. Papua New Guinea won the gold medal and retained it in subsequent games. Other teams that have competed at Australian Rules in the games include Japan, Nauru, and a Northern Territory indigenous team. The International Australian Football Council (IAFC) was formed after the 1995 Games.

Inspired by successful Arafura Games competitions, the inaugural Australian Football International Cup was held in Melbourne in 2002, as the last act of the IAFC, and held in conjunction with the AFL. The 2002 cup was contested by eleven teams from around the world, made up exclusively of non-Australians. Ireland won, defeating Papua New Guinea in the final.

In the interim years, Japan and New Zealand played an annual game as a curtain raiser to the AFL games. The New Zealand national team were victorious by 100 points in 2003, and so, in 2004, a club side from Auckland played the game, which Japan lost by two points. The amateur Australian Convicts also toured, playing several matches against sides from developing nations.

The second Australian Football International Cup was held in Melbourne in 2005, again under the guidance and funding of the AFL, with New Zealand defeating Papua New Guinea in the final. Third place went to the United States of America.

In 2001 The United States, Great Britain, Denmark and Ireland competed in the Atalantic Alliance Cup. This was fore runner to other European competitions starting with the EU Cup which became the Euro Cup and also the Central European Australian Football league Championships .

In 2006, Denmark, Sweden and Germany competed in a tri-nations series, which was planned to be repeated annually.

The third Australian Football International Cup was held in 2008 by the AFL in Melbourne, with a record 16 teams competing. Papua New Guinea won their first title, defeating New Zealand, and South Africa controversially defeated Ireland by 1 point to finish third.

The fourth Australian Football International Cup was held in 2011 by the AFL in Melbourne and Sydney, with a record 18 teams competing. Ireland won their second title by defeating Papua New Guinea who have appeared in every AFL International Cup grand final.

Other international competitions that included some Australian expatriates are also held, including the EU Cup, which was first held in 2005 in London, featuring ten teams. In 2007 the Cup was held in Hamburg, with twelve teams.

In 2013 the East Asia Australian Football League was formed with Cambodia, Malaysia, Thailand, Vietnam, Singapore, Jakarta and Laos competing. Also the South China Australian Football League consists of three teams from Hong Kong, Macau, Landau and Gangzhou.

=== World rankings ===
Although the AFL is regarded as the world governing body, it does not publish statistics for matches that it does not specifically sanction. By 2009, the only attempt to consolidate all world rankings was created by the World Footy News website, which for 2008 listed 22 countries, from Australia (1st) through to India (22nd). Detailed criteria were given as to whether a country qualified for consideration, though ultimately the rankings were listed as unofficial, and are only noteworthy because of the lack of any other system. The unofficial 2008 Australian Football World Rankings.

=== International rules Australia vs Ireland ===
A series of hybrid International rules matches between the Australian Football League's best professional players and a representative Gaelic football team from Ireland's Gaelic Athletic Association amateur players known as the International Rules Series were staged annually between 1998 and 2017. The rules are a compromise between the two codes, using a round ball and a rectangular field. The fierce tackling of the Australian code is allowed, although this has caused controversy with the Irish players. The series have remained evenly matched with each side winning 10 of their encounters. The Irish team is known for its speed and skill and the Australians for their strength and power — both inherent skills in their respective codes.

== International promotion, funding & governance ==
The International Australian Football Council (IAFC) was formed in 1995 by a subset of playing countries to promote and develop Australian football internationally, before unanimously dissolving in favour of the AFL in 2002.

The AFL has stated that it does not see the need for a FIFA style governing body until at least 2050, so it sees its role as primarily responsible for worldwide funding and governance. Despite this, it allocates a tiny fraction of its revenue with the majority (tens of millions) going to New South Wales and Queensland as has been the case for the majority of the code's development finding since the 1890s. This disparity has seen the AFL's commitment to growing the code outside of Australia has been questioned both within and outside of Australia. It has also been questioned for spending large amounts of money promoting alternative sports such as AFLX and International Rules Football over Australian rules in an attempt to increase the league's appeal overseas.

In the mid-2000s, it provided around $30 million for development of the game in Australia and around A$500,000 annually for international development, with the following breakdown in 2005:

AFL Funding
Country	2005	2023
New Zealand	AUD$150,000	NZD$235,000
United States of America	AUD$90,000	USD$187,000
South Africa	AUD$100,000	
Papua New Guinea	AUD$45,000	
Other	AUD$115,000	
Total	AUD$500,000	

Including AFL exhibition and NAB Cup matches, indigenous and AIS youth tours, International Cup funding and staff funding, this will have risen to around A$2,000,000 annually by 2008. Additional support for countries such as South Africa is leveraged through contacts with industry, and is increasingly adding to the total investment.

Much of the additional international promotion of the game is fuelled by exhibition matches, expatriate Australians, local leagues, and various AusAID projects. The internet is seen as a key tool in keeping diverse Australian football communities in contact.

=== High profile advocates ===
Although international football has a low profile within Australia, the issue is getting increased media exposure as several high-profile Australians have become advocates for international football. High-profile Australian Football identities that are involved in, have expressed interest in or are passionate about international footy at some stage include Ron Barassi, Kevin Sheedy, Jim Stynes, Paul Roos, Robert DiPierdomenico, Michael Long, Garry Lyon, Peter Schwab, Guy McKenna, Glenn Archer, Jason McCartney, Wayne Schwass, and Mal Michael. Other players who have expressed views or interest on the topic include David Rodan, Alipate Carlile, Jimmy Bartel, Jason Akermanis, Aaron Edwards, and Brad Moran. Former AFL players Mark Zanotti and John Ironmonger have been directly involved in living and establishing clubs overseas. Other non-players such as John So, Eddie McGuire, and Tiffany Cherry have also expressed interest in the media about the game being played or watched overseas.

== Women's competitions ==
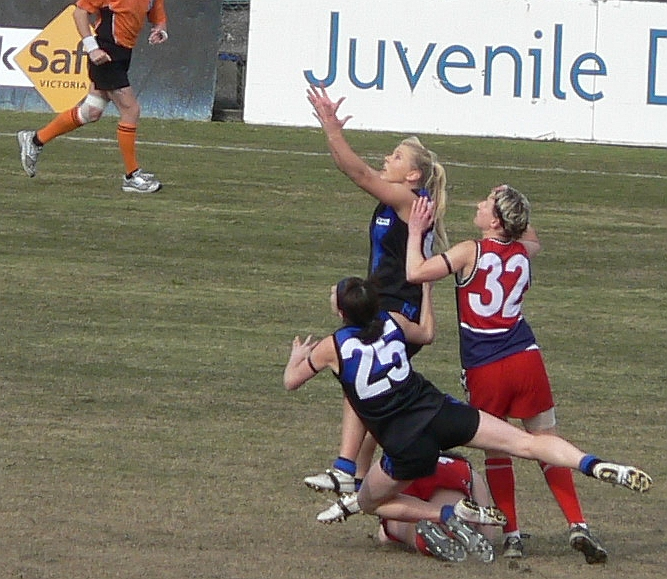
Women's Australian rules football

Australia has had many women's leagues at both state and local level for decades. The first semi-professional women's Australian football league, the AFLW was founded in late 2016, after the AFL had conducted several exhibition matches over the previous few years. The inaugural season, held in 2017 was considered a huge success by the AFL. The league expanded multiple times between 2019 and 2022, and now each AFL club has both a men's and women's team.

Internationally, women's Australian football is played at amateur level in several countries, particularly in the United Kingdom, North America and parts of Europe and Asia. and a dozen teams have represented their nations at one or more Australian Football International Cup since 2011. Ireland and Canada have dominated thus far, being the only teams to contest the women's grand final in the competition. Ireland's team, nicknamed the Banshees, are the most recent winners, defeating Canada by just four points in the grand final of the 2017 tournament.

== Junior competitions ==
Several countries now have youth Australian rules programs in place. These countries include Papua New Guinea, New Zealand, Samoa, Tonga, Nauru, Denmark, South Africa, England, Indonesia, the United States, and Canada. The number of participants is quite high in PNG, RSA and NZ generally dependent on the level of AFL funding but some "private" endeavours in Canada and the UK have produced significant results.

Since 1998, the Barassi International Australian Football Youth Tournament, endorsed by the Australian Football League as part of its International Policy, has hosted several of these nation's representative youth teams.

The first fully representative junior international Australian football outside of Australia was played between England and Denmark in Farum, Denmark, in October 2005. The Jakarta Bulldogs Australian Football Club, founded in 2006 by Alf Eddy, was an Australian Football Club made up of Under 18-year-old expatriate and local students in Jakarta. The team played against local teams such as the Pancawati Eagles, Depok Garudas, and the Jakarta Bintangs, and also travelled to Singapore and Malaysia in 2008 and 2009, respectively, for the Asian Australian Football Championships. The Bulldogs won the competition in both years. Currently there is an increasing number of junior international Australian Football notably, North America, Scandinavia and the Pacific.

== Specific development projects ==
=== South African AusAID project ===
An AusAID funded project is South African junior development began in 2003, which is assisted by aid agency Australian Volunteers International in partnership with programs such as AFL Auskick, and sponsored by Tattersalls as well as the South African North West Academy of Sport.

==== Aussie Rules Schools (England) ====
Another funded junior project is Aussie Rules Schools UK, which is funded by Sport England and co-ordinated by AFL England and AFL Europe. This project has seen up to ten English schools adopt Aussie Rules as part of the school curriculum to combat obesity.

==== China AusAID project ====
In February 2006, a joint project between the AFL, Melbourne Football Club, Melbourne City Council, and AusAID to post an Australian Youth Ambassador in Tianjin, a city of 10 million, about 120 kilometres (75 mi) southeast of Beijing in an effort to kickstart Australian Football in China was announced.

==== Pacific AusAID projects ====
There have been full-time development officers in Tonga and Samoa, as part of AusAid projects, since 2005.

== International drafts and converts ==
=== International players ===
Michito Sakaki from Japan became the first international player to play at AFL level when selected to play for the Essendon Football Club against the Sydney Swans at an exhibition match at North Sydney Oval in February 2006. Mike Pyke, a former Canadian rugby player, was drafted to the Sydney Swans in 2009, and played his first game in Round 7 of 2009 against Geelong, becoming the first non-Irish international player to play an official league game.

=== Converts ===
==== Gaelic converts to Australian football ====
Australia has recruited several Irish Gaelic footballers to play Aussie Rules. As Gaelic football is primarily an amateur competition and the AFL competition is professional, there is a strong financial lure. In the 1980s, the Melbourne Football Club recruited Jim Stynes, who would turn out to be the most successful Irish player in the history of the VFL/AFL, winning the Brownlow medal. At around the same time, the club recruited the Scot Sean Wight. In more recent years, the Sydney Swans recruited Irishman Tadhg Kennelly, who played in a premiership with the club and has also represented Ireland against Australia. Carlton Football Club experimented with brothers Setanta Ó hAilpín and Aisake Ó hAilpín also Carlton Football Club has selected defender Zach Tuohy who now plays for Geelong. The Collingwood Football Club has recruited Martin Clarke, and the Brisbane Lions recruited Colm Begley and Brendan Quigley to their international rookie list. Due to increasing concern from the Gaelic Athletic Association, in 2006 the AFL made a deal with the GAA to limit the number of junior Gaelic drafts.

==== Australian football converts to American football (Gridiron) ====
Australia has exported players to the NFL. Since the 1980s, many AFL players have tried out as American football punters. The special teams position requires the long range kicking skills often used by Australian football players, particularly those playing centre half-forward and full-forward. Although the punter position is one of the least valuable on an NFL team, punters and kickers have an average salary of around US$860,000 which surpasses the wages of AFL players, who average A$221,000. As the position is less physically demanding, it has also become attractive for players heading into retirement.

== International recognition ==
Although Australian rules football has not yet been a full sport at the Olympic Games or Commonwealth Games, when Melbourne hosted the 1956 Summer Olympics, which included the MCG being the main stadium, Australian rules football was chosen as the native sport to be demonstrated as per International Olympic Committee rules. On 7 December, the sport was demonstrated as an exhibition match at the MCG between a team of VFL and VFA amateurs and a team of VAFA amateurs (professionals were excluded due to the Olympics' strict amateurism policy at the time). The Duke of Edinburgh was among the spectators for the match, which the VAFA won by 12.9 (81) to 8.7 (55). Australian rules was once again a demonstration sport at the 1982 Commonwealth Games in Brisbane.

A fan of the sport since attending school in Victoria, King Charles III is the Patron of AFL Europe. In 2013, participation across AFL Europe's 21 member nations was more than 5,000 players, the majority of which are European nationals rather than Australian expats.

== See also ==
- List of Australian Football Leagues outside Australia
- Australian Football International Cup
- List of International Australian rules football tournaments
- List of national Australian rules football teams
- Australian rules football exhibition matches
