= AFL Transatlantic Cup =

Australian rules football competition

AFL Transantlantic Cup
- Sport: Australian rules football
- First season: 2024
- No. of teams: 2024: 6 men's & 6 women's
- Country: Host: Canada
- Most recent champions: (Republic of Ireland) Ireland (men) (Republic of Ireland) Ireland (women)
- Most titles: (Republic of Ireland) Ireland (men; 1 title) (Republic of Ireland) Ireland (women; 1 title)
- Broadcaster: YouTube

The AFL Transatlantic Cup is a triennial international tournament in Australian rules football. It is the biggest international tournament in the sport that is open to all nations in Europe and the Americas. It was created as a replacement of the AFL International Cup alongside the AFL Asia Cup and the AFL Pacific Cup after the competition was affected by the COVID-19 pandemic.

In August 2021, the AFL announced that the IC would return in 2023 to align with its original three-year schedule but did not announce the host. On 22 April 2022, the AFL announced it was postponing the International Cup until 2024 citing "significant investment required from the AFL to host the event". However, on 24 July 2023, the AFL announced that, in lieu of the International Cup, that it would be sponsoring three regional events in 2024: the Trans-Atlantic Cup, the Asia Cup, and the Pacific Cup to be hosted by an international affiliate. The AFL gave no indication as to when the International Cup would be resumed, however indicated that these are the only AFL sanctioned international tournaments since 2017 (effectively nullifying the 2019 and 2022 AFL Europe Championship). AFL Canada was announced as host of the Transatlantic Cup to be held at the Humber College Oval at Colonel Samuel Smith Park in Toronto on August 2–11, The Maroochydore Multi Sports Complex on the Sunshine Coast, Queensland was announced as the host of the Pacific Cup on 14–24 November. Thanh Long Sports Center in Vietnam would host the Asia Cup at in Ho Chi Minh City from December 6–8 in 2024. The AFL announced strict selection criteria, that each player must hold citizenship for the country that they are representing and must have played in from a local competition in that country.

The Ireland team won both the men's and women's title at the 2024 event, beating the USA in both tournaments.

== Men's Transatlantic Cup ==
Flag(s)	Nation(s)	Moniker	2024 (Canada) (6)	2027
(Canada)	Canada	Northwind	4th	
(Colombia)	Colombia	Jaguares	6th	
(France)	France	Coqs	5th	
(United Kingdom)	Great Britain	Bulldogs	3rd	
(Republic of Ireland)	Ireland	Warriors	1st	
(United States)	United States	Revolution	2nd	

== Women's Transatlantic Cup ==
Flag(s)	Nation(s)	Moniker	2024 (Canada) (6)	2027
(Canada)	Canada	Northern Lights	3rd	
(Colombia)	Colombia	Jaguares	5th	
(France)	France	Gauloises	6th	
(United Kingdom)	Great Britain	Swans	4th	
(Republic of Ireland)	Ireland	Banshees	1st	
(United States)	United States	Freedom	2nd	

== also ==
Australian Football International Cup
