= Aaron Flood =

Gaelic footballer

Personal information
- Born: Kildare, Ireland

Sport
- Sport: Gaeilic football
- Position: Half back, Midfielder
Clubs
- Years: Club
- St Laurence's Gaa & midland tigers

Aaron Flood is a former Kildare Gaelic footballer.

== Playing career ==
Flood represented Kildare GAA at senior level in the O'Byrne Cup and the NFL from 2005 to 2008. He previously played as a Ruck rover for the Ireland national Australian rules football team, that won the 2001 Atlantic Alliance Cup and 2002 Australian Football International Cup. He was one of Ireland's best on ground in the final against Papua New Guinea and was also selected on the International cup All-Star Team.
