= Alan Coomey =

Irish Gaelic and Australian rules footballer

Personal information
- Native name: Ailin Mac Comaidh (Irish)
- Born: 25 June 1984 (age 42) Cork, Ireland
- Height: 186 cm (73 in)

Sport
- Sport: Gaelic football
- Position: Half Forward
Club
- Years: Club
- Bishopstown GAA

Alan Coomey

Personal information
- Nickname: Cooms
- Original team: Leeside Lions.
- Height: 186 cm (73 in)
- Weight: 92 kg (203 lb)
- Position: Centre line

Club information
- Current club: East Fremantle Football Club

Playing career^{1}
Years	Club	Games (Goals)
2011 –	Northampton Rams A.F.C.(loan)	12

International team honours
Years	Team	Games (Goals)
2001–2011	Ireland	19
- ^{1} Playing statistics correct to the end of 2011.

Alan Coomey (born 25 June 1984) is a Gaelic footballer and Australian rules footballer

== Playing career ==
Coomey played wingman for the Ireland national Australian rules football team, that won the 2001 Atlantic Alliance Cup and the 2002 Australian Football International Cup. He was one of Ireland's best on ground, kicking 3 goals in the final against Papua New Guinea. He returned with the team to help them reclaim the 2011 Australian Football International Cup title and kicked one goal in the tournament. He joined the East Fremantle Football Club, but never played a league game. He previously played for Bishopstown GAA & Leeside Lions.
