= Denis Reidy =

Irish Gaelic footballer

Personal information
- Native name: Donnacha Ó Riada (Irish)
- Born: Limerick, Ireland
- Occupation: Materials Scientist
- Height: 6 ft 1 in (185 cm)

Sport
- Sport: Gaelic football
Clubs
- Years: Club
- Gerald Griffin's GAA; Den Haag GAA; Leeside Lions; Ballybrown Hurling club
Club titles
- Cork titles: 1
- Munster titles: 1
Inter-county
- Years: County
- pre 2001: Limerick

Dr. Denis Reidy is a former Limerick GAA Gaelic footballer.

== Playing career ==
=== Gaelic Football ===
The Gerald Griffins GAA clubman represented Limerick GAA at Senior, Under 21 and Junior championship level, winning a McGrath Cup medal in 2001. He played for the University College Cork team that won the Cork Senior Football Championship and Munster Senior Club Football Championship in 1999. He also won a University and Colleges Division 1 All-Ireland SF League winners medal in 1996.

=== Hurling ===
Reidy also played hurling for Ballybrown Hurling club that won the Limerick Under-21 Hurling Championship in 1992 and also represented University of Limerick that won the University and Colleges Division 1 All-Ireland SH League in 1991.

=== Australian Rules Football ===
Reidy played full back for the Ireland national Australian rules football team, that won the 2001 Atlantic Alliance Cup and the 2002 Australian Football International Cup. He was one of Ireland's best on ground in the final against Papua New Guinea.
