= 2002 Australian Football International Cup =

2002 AFL International Cup

Tournament details
- Host country: Australia
- Dates: 14–24 August 2002
- Teams: 11

Final positions
- Champions: Ireland (1st title)
- Runners-up: Papua New Guinea
- Third place: New Zealand
- Fourth place: Denmark

The 2002 Australian Football International Cup was the inaugural international Australian rules football tournament held in Melbourne, Australia in 2002.

11 nations participated from around the world and the tournament was officiated by the International Australian Football Council.

Ireland won the tournament, finishing undefeated and victorious over Papua New Guinea in the Grand Final on 23 August at the Melbourne Cricket Ground (MCG).

== Pool A ==
Flag	Nation	Rep team
(Denmark)	Denmark	Vikings
(United Kingdom)	Great Britain	Bulldogs
(Japan)	Japan	Samurais
(Nauru)	Nauru	Chiefs
(Papua New Guinea)	Papua New Guinea	Mosquitos

== Pool B ==
Flag	Nation	Rep team
(Canada)	Canada	Northwind
(Republic of Ireland)	Ireland	Warriors
(New Zealand)	New Zealand	Falcons
(Samoa)	Samoa	Bulldogs
(South Africa)	South Africa	Buffaloes
(United States)	United States	Revolution

== Group Stage ==
=== Round 1 ===
- PNG 13.11 (89) d. Great Britain 2.2 (14) – Warrawee Park, Oakleigh
- Nauru 17.17 (119) d. Japan 1.8 (14) – Warrawee Park, Oakleigh
- USA 7.10 (52) d. Samoa 4.7 (31) – TEAC Oval, Port Melbourne
- New Zealand 25.13 (163) d. South Africa 0.1 (1) – Trevor Barker Beach Oval, Sandringham
- Ireland 7.14 (56) d. Canada 4.7 (31) – Trevor Barker Beach Oval, Sandringham

=== Round 2 ===
- PNG 9.15 (69) d. Denmark 3.5 (23)
- Great Britain 9.11 (65) d. Nauru 8.11 (59) – Elsternwick Park, Elsternwick
- Canada 4.11 (38) d. South Africa 1.5 (11)
- Ireland 5.6 (36) d. Samoa 4.5 (29)
- New Zealand 11.12 (78) d. USA 4.1 (25)

=== Round 3 ===
- Great Britain 7.3 (45) d. Japan 4.6 (30) – Whitten Oval, Footscray
- Denmark 5.10 (40) d. Nauru 3.9 (27)
- Samoa 12.15 (87) d. South Africa 1.4 (10)
- New Zealand 10.8 (68) d. Canada 2.6 (18)
- Ireland 7.7 (49) d. USA 6.3 (39)

=== Round 4 ===
- Denmark 12.9 (81) d. Great Britain 4.2 (26)
- PNG 23.9 (147) d. Japan 0.0 (0)
- Ireland 15.8 (98) d. South Africa 3.3 (21)
- USA 8.4 (52) d. Canada 1.1 (7)
- New Zealand 10.10 (70) d. Samoa 5.8 (38)

=== Round 5 ===
- Denmark 10.6 (66) d. Japan 4.7 (32)
- PNG 13.13 (91) d. Nauru 6.8 (44)
- USA 20.12 (132) d. South Africa 0.4 (4)
- Samoa 9.15 (69) d. Canada 0.5 (5)
- Ireland 4.10 (34) d. New Zealand 3.2 (20)

=== Standings ===
==== Group A ====
Pos	Team	Pld	W	L	D	PF	PA	PP	Pts	Advancement
1	Papua New Guinea	4	4	0	0	396	81	488.9	16	advance to Grand Final
2	Denmark	4	3	1	0	210	154	136.4	12	advance to placement matches
3	(United Kingdom) Great Britain	4	2	2	0	150	274	54.7	8	advance to placement matches
4	Nauru	4	1	3	0	249	210	118.6	4	advance to placement matches
5	Japan	4	0	4	0	76	362	21.0	0	advance to placement matches

Updated to match(es) played on unknown. Source:
Rules for classification: 1) points; 2) percentage; 3) number of points for

==== Group B ====
Pos	Team	Pld	W	L	D	PF	PA	PP	Pts	Advancement
1	(Republic of Ireland) Ireland	5	5	0	0	273	140	195.0	20	advance to Grand Final
2	New Zealand	5	4	1	0	399	116	344.0	16	advance to placement matches
3	United States	5	3	2	0	300	169	177.5	12	advance to placement matches
4	Samoa	5	2	3	0	254	173	146.8	8	advance to placement matches
5	Canada	5	1	4	0	99	256	38.7	4	advance to placement matches
6	South Africa	5	0	5	0	47	518	9.1	0	

Updated to match(es) played on unknown. Source:

== Playoffs ==
=== Minor Placing deciders ===
- New Zealand 3.7 (25) d. Denmark 2.4 (16)
- Samoa 5.7 (37) d. Nauru 2.8 (20)
- Canada 6.5 (41) d. Japan 5.2 (32)
- USA 13.15 (93) d. Great Britain 2.3 (15) – Junction Oval, St Kilda

=== Grand final ===
Friday 23 August 2002

(Republic of Ireland); Ireland	51 – 19	Papua New Guinea	Stadium: Melbourne Cricket Ground; Attendance: 32,393 ^{[A]} Match Report
7; 9 A.Coomey 3, J.O'Sullivan, D.Burns, L. O'Connor, D.Stynes; Alan Coomey, Denis Reidy, Joe Cunnane, Declan O Sullivan	Goals; Behinds; Scorers; Best	2; 7 Peter Melli, John Bosko; Rex Leika, Peter Melli,	Stadium: Melbourne Cricket Ground; Attendance: 32,393 ^{[A]} Match Report

^{A} Grand Final was played as a curtain raiser to the round 21 AFL match between Hawthorn vs North Melbourne, so this figure is the total crowd for the match, although not all spectators were inside the stadium at the start or conclusion of the curtain raiser event.

Ireland Squad	Coach	Manager
Michael Johnson (C), Neil McFlynn, Donal Boylan, Dualtach Johnson, Barry Denham (VC), Ryan McFlynn, Michael Currane, Fergal Bradshaw, Joe Cunnane, Aaron Flood, Derek Mulligan, Alan Kelly, Denis Reidy, Fergal Killoury, Diarmuid Griffin, Gary Lane, Liam O'Connor, Brian Currane, Declan O'Sullivan, Paul Kiely, John Lack O'Sullivan, Alan Coomey, Emmet Humphries, Declan Cotter, Brian Shortall, Sean McPhillips, Brian Boyle, David Stynes, Damien Burns.	Darren Fitzpatrick	Damien Cassidy

Papua New Guinea Squad	Coach	Manager
Navu Maha (C), Jackson Gavuri (VC), Walter Yangomina, John Ropa, Douglas Lai, Vagi Lai, John Bosko, Stephen Keu, Nelson Saroa, Andrew Boko, Abraham Henao, Rex Leka, Overa Gibson, Matthew Mondo, David Gavara, Bruce Sovara, Pepe Kila, Nathan Lowa, Peter Meli, Raymond Rae, Bruce Tandawai, Alphonse Gela, Joe Dau, Peter Maisu, Hendrey Pare, Matthew Bae, Fidelis Kelteri, Patrick Vuluka, Richard Aupae, Joachim Loggha	Andrew Cadozow	Stanley Tavul

== Final standings ==
1. (Republic of Ireland) Ireland
2. Papua New Guinea
3. New Zealand
4. Denmark
5. (United States) USA
6. (United Kingdom) Great Britain
7. Samoa
8. Nauru
9. Canada
10. Japan
11. South Africa

== All-International Team ==
A 22 player All-International squad was named, however names were unplaced and not allocated to any specific field position.

Player	Nation	Club
Stefan Leyhane	Canada	Broadview Hawks
Erik Krolmark	Denmark	North Copenhagen Barracudas
Mogens Hansen	Denmark	North Copenhagen Barracudas
John Boyle	(United Kingdom) Great Britain	West London Wildcats
Ben Rees	(United Kingdom) Great Britain	Sussex Swans
Michael Johnson	(Republic of Ireland) Ireland	Belfast Redbacks
Aaron Flood	(Republic of Ireland) Ireland	Midland Tigers
Liam O'Connor	(Republic of Ireland) Ireland	Leeside Lions
David Stynes	(Republic of Ireland) Ireland	Dublin Demons
Yuta Kobayasi	Japan	Tokyo Goannas
Alfred Spanner	Nauru	Menaida
Quinson Cook	Nauru	Menaida
Vince Serci	New Zealand	Eastern Suburbs
Steve Frogatt	New Zealand	University
Mike Seversinsen	New Zealand	Eastern Suburbs
Walter Yandomina	Papua New Guinea	Enga
John Bosko	Papua New Guinea	Morobe
Navu Maha	Papua New Guinea	Central
Overa Gibson	Papua New Guinea	Gulf
Fia Tootoo	Samoa	Clayton
Mikaele Pesamino	Samoa	Fasitoo-Uta Tigers
Mtutuzeli Hlomela	South Africa	Johannesburg
Charley Ellis	United States	Denver Bulldogs
Chad Martin	United States	Phoenix Scorpions
