= John Lack O'Sullivan =

Irish Gaelic and Australian rules footballer

Personal information
- Native name: Seán Lack Ó Súileabháin (Irish)
- Born: 1976 County Cork, Ireland
- Died: 19 November 2002 (aged 25–26)
- Occupation: Teacher

Sport
- Sport: Gaelic football
Clubs
- Years: Club
- Adrigole GFC; Beara GAA; Leeside Lions
Club titles
- Cork titles: 1 U-21; 1 Junior

John Lack O'Sullivan (1976 – 19 November 2002) was a Gaelic footballer and Australian rules footballer.

== Playing career ==
The Adrigole GFC clubman was one of key players that won the Cork Junior Football Championship in 2002, but died in November 2002 before the final from a cardiac condition while swimming. He played for his divisional side Beara GAA that won the Cork Under-21 Football Championship in 1997 and has also represented Cork GAA at underage level.

John Lack played for the Ireland national Australian rules football team that won the 2002 Australian Football International Cup and kicked a goal in the final against Papua New Guinea. The Australian Rules Football League of Ireland Premiership Trophy is named in his honour.
