= Derek Mulligan =

Irish Gaelic and Australian rules footballer

Personal information
- Native name: Deirg Ó Maolagáin (Irish)
- Born: Westmeath, Ireland

Sport
- Sport: Gaelic football
Club
- Years: Club
- St Mary's GAA of Rochfortbridge
Inter-county
- Years: County
- Westmeath

Derek Mulligan is a former Westmeath junior Gaelic footballer and an Australian rules footballer.

== Playing career ==
The St Mary's of Rochfortbridge clubman represented Westmeath GAA at junior level. Mulligan also represented the Ireland national Australian rules football team, that won the 2001 Atlantic Alliance Cup and 2002 Australian Football International Cup. In the opening game of the International Cup against Canada, Mulligan made the "mark" of the tournament, but then disaster struck when he suffered a double break of the ankle which forced him to miss the remainder of the competition.
