= Cunnane =

Cunnane is a surname. Notable people with the surname include:

- Joe Cunnane (born 1971), Irish Gaelic footballer and Australian rules footballer
- Joseph Cunnane (1913–2001), Irish Roman Catholic archbishop
- Will Cunnane (born 1974), American baseball player
