= David Stynes =

Irish Gaelic and Australian rules footballer

Personal information
- Born: 1976 (age 49–50) Dublin, Ireland

Sport
- Sport: Gaelic football
- Position: Midfield, Half Forward
Clubs
- Years: Club
- Ballyboden St Enda's; Whitehorse Pioneers
Inter-county
Years	County	Apps (scores)
	Dublin	1
Inter-county titles
- Leinster titles: 1 minor

David Stynes (born 1976) is a former Gaelic footballer and Australian rules footballer.

== Playing career ==
=== Australian rules football ===
Stynes played for Ireland's winning team in the 2002 Australian Football International Cup in Melbourne. He was also selected for the All-Star Team, and returned with the team that reached the semi-finals of the 2005 Australian Football International Cup. He won his second medal when Ireland won the 2011 Australian Football International Cup title. In 2011 David was appointed captain coach of the Moorabbin Kangaroos in the Southern Football League in Victoria.

=== Gaelic football ===
The Ballyboden St Enda's clubman represented Dublin GAA at minor level and won a Leinster Minor Football Championship medal in 1994 before losing to Galway in the All-Ireland semi-final. He also represented Dublin at under-21 & Senior level. In Australia, he represented Victoria in the Australasian GAA Championships.

== Family ==
His brother Brian was a Gaelic footballer who played for the Dublin senior team and won an All-Ireland Senior Football Championship medal in 1995, while his late brother Jim won the Brownlow Medal and played with the Melbourne Football Club.
