= Ireland national Australian rules football team =

National sports team

Republic of Ireland
- Nickname(s): The Warriors (Men); The Banshees (Women)
- Governing body: Australian Rules Football League of Ireland

Rankings
- Current: 3rd (as of February 2025)

First international
- (Republic of Ireland) Ireland 124 – 15 Great Britain (United Kingdom) (2001)

International Cup
- Appearances: 6 (first in 2002)
- Best result: 1st (2002, 2011)

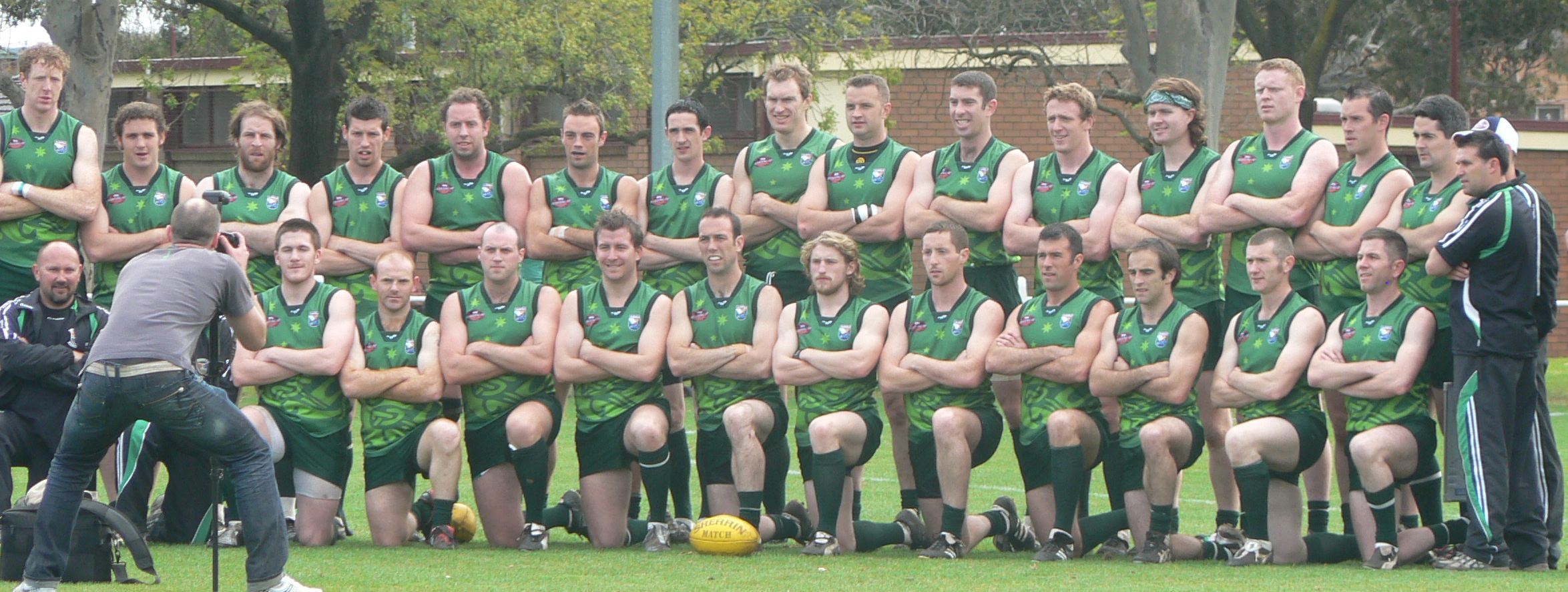
International Cup team in 2008 lining up for a photo

The Irish national Australian rules football team represent Ireland in Australian rules football and is usually selected from the best Irish born and raised players primarily from the clubs of the Australian Rules Football League of Ireland but also playing abroad.

The men's team formed in 2001, going through the Atlantic Alliance Cup undefeated in 2001 to become European champions before also taking the 2002 AFL International Cup where it has made the finals ever since including a 2011 championship. In the early 2010s it was a European powerhouse, winning back-to-back AFL Europe championships in 2010 and 2013 and Euro Cup championships in 2011 and 2012. In 2022 it won the AFL Europe championship and 2023, the EU Cup. It has formed intense international rivalries with Papua New Guinea and New Zealand and European rivalries with Great Britain and Denmark and remains in the top five nations in the sport.

The women's team formed in 2011 for its International Cup debut and is equally successful, being crowned European champions in 2019 and 2022 (the most of any women's side) in addition to a record 6 Euro Cup championships. It has made the final in every International Cup with 2 International Cup forming a strong rivalry with Canada.

The performance of the Irish team is often influenced by the availability of experienced players from Gaelic games, especially Gaelic football, due to the similarities between the two sports. While the Gaelic Athletic Association (GAA) and the Australian Football League (AFL) maintain a long-standing relationship through International rules football matches, Ireland's Australian rules football team is typically composed of club-level Gaelic footballers. This cross-sport familiarity contributes to Ireland's competitive standing at the international level.

A women's team representing the Irish footballers competing in the AFL Women's (AFLW) competition will contest their first representative match against Australia in August 2026.

== Identity ==
The team wears a green (one of the national colours of Ireland) guernsey with a Celtic strip featuring the Irish harp symbol. For the 2022 AFL European Championships, both men's and women's teams adopted a darker green, ditching the harp for a more traditional Australian rules guernsey consisting of a white and orange chevron across the chest.

== History ==
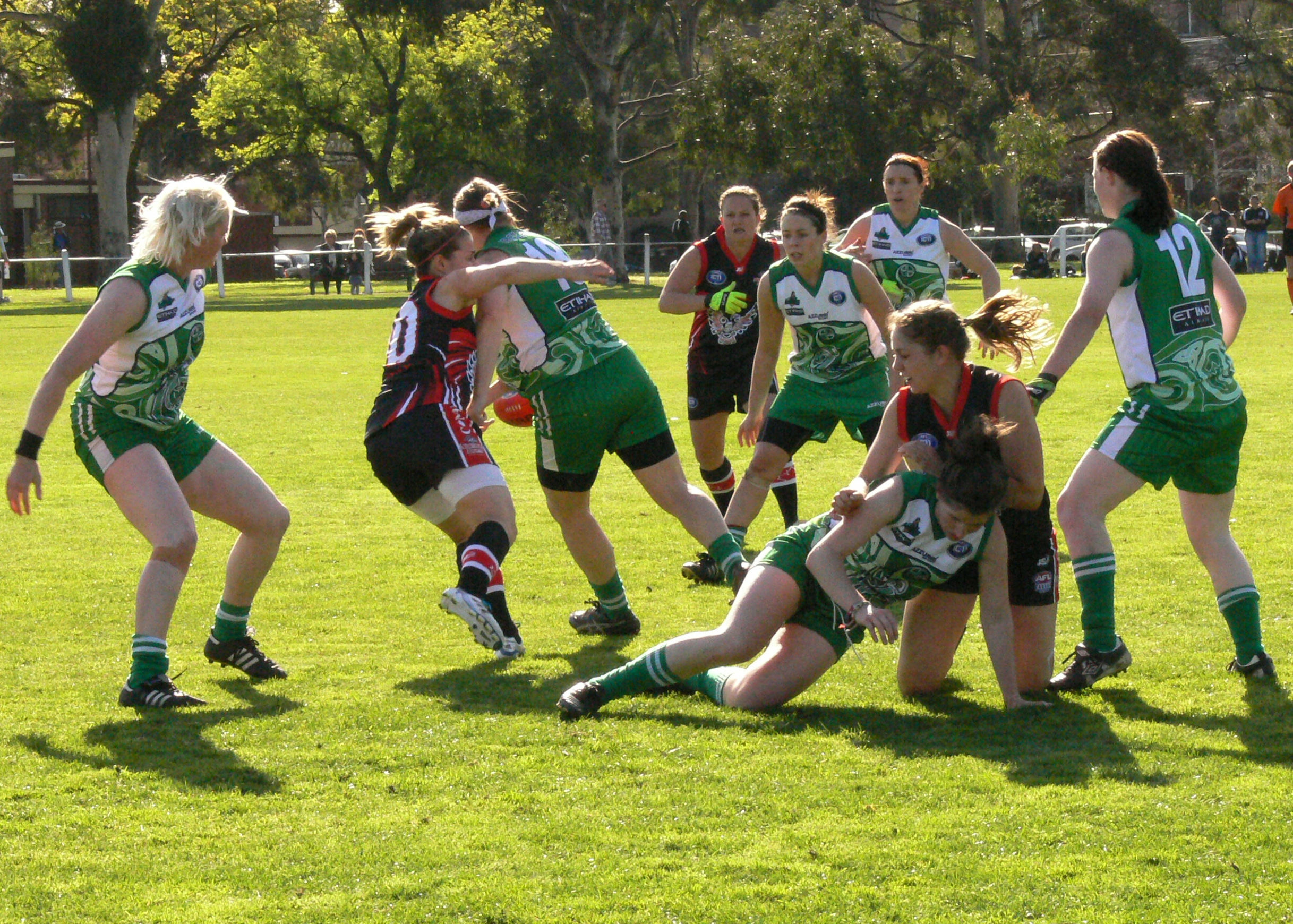
A match between Irish Banshees and the USA Freedom in the women's division of the 2011 Australian Football International Cup

The Irish team won the Atlantic Alliance Cup in 2001 to become the Northern Hemisphere champions.

The Warriors returned to the International Cup in 2014 fielding a strong team.

== Test results ==
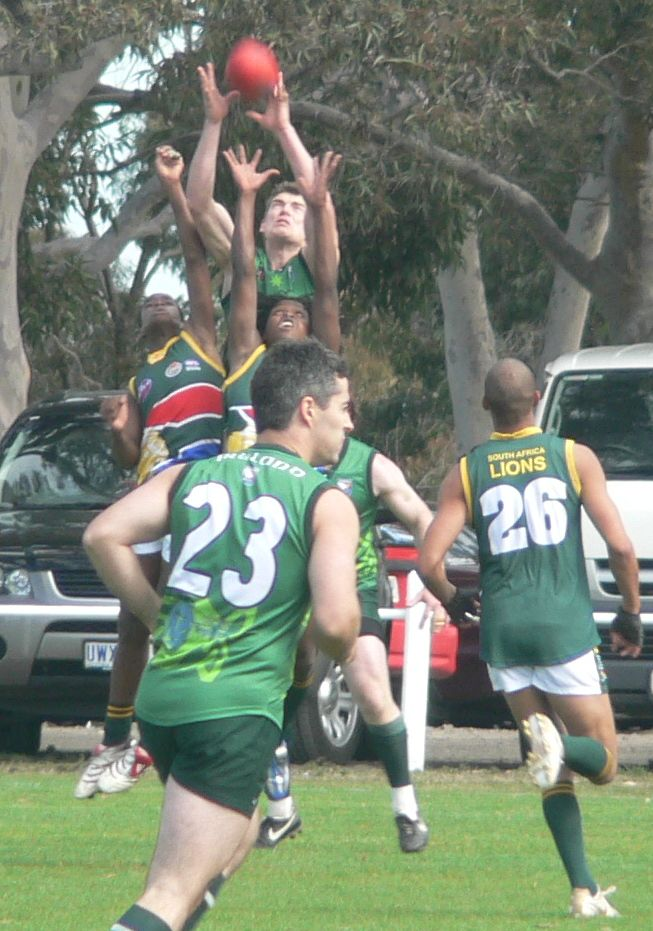
Ireland's All-International Mike Finn takes a spectacular mark over a pack of South African opponents in the 2008 AFL International Cup

Year	Result	Venue
2005	Ireland 8.9.(57) defeated Great Britain 5.6.(36)	London, UK
2006	Ireland defeated Great Britain	London, UK
2007	Great Britain 11.15 (81) defeated Ireland 2.9(21)	Dublin, Ireland
2009	Ireland 8.6 (54) defeated Great Britain 4.9 (33)	Dublin, Ireland

== Men's International honours ==
Year	Finish	Atlantic Alliance Cup	Coach	Manager
2001	1st	Michael Johnson (C), Shane O'Laughlin, Dominic O'Laughlin, Dermot O'Laughlin, Michael Currane, Fergal Bradshaw, Joe Cunnane, Aaron Flood, Derek Mulligan, Alan Kelly, Denis Reidy, Fergal Killoury, Diarmuid Griffin, Liam O'Connor, Brian Currane, Derek Collentine, Alan Coomey, Emmet Humphries, Declan Cotter, Steve Brennan, Kieran Brennan, Paul Crowley, James McCartan Jr., Will Hayes, Robert Toal, David Walsh; RESULTS: IRE 18.16(124) d. GB 2.3(15), IRE 9.9(63) d. USA 4.5(29), IRE 8.9(57) d. DEN 1.4(10), IRE 7.21(63) d. CAN 1.5(11) *FINAL: IRE 6.12(48) d. DEN 3.1(19)	Darren Fitzpatrick	Dave Tierney
Year	Finish	Australian Football International Cup	Coach	Manager
2002	1st	Michael Johnson (C), Neil McFlynn, Donal Boylan, Dualtach Johnson, Barry Denham (VC), Ryan McFlynn, Michael Currane, Fergal Bradshaw, Joe Cunnane, Aaron Flood, Derek Mulligan, Alan Kelly, Denis Reidy, Fergal Killoury, Diarmuid Griffin, Gary Lane, Liam O'Connor, Brian Currane, Declan O'Sullivan, Paul Kiely, John Lack O'Sullivan, Alan Coomey, Emmet Humphries, Declan Cotter, Brian Shortall, Seán McPhillips, Brian Boyle, David Stynes, Damien Burns. RESULTS: IRE 7.14(56) def CAN 4.7(31), IRE 5.6(36) def SAM 4.5(29), IRE 7.7(49) d. USA 6.3(39), IRE 15.8(98) def SA 3.3(21), IRE 4.10(34) def NZ 3.2(20) *FINAL: IRE 7.9(51) def PNG 2.7(19)	Darren Fitzpatrick	Damien Cassidy
2005	4th	Mark Ryan, Dennis Goggin, Phillip Whelan, James Flavin, Ciaran Drummey, Declan Drummey, John Enright, John Fahy, Seán Fallon, Dennis Kenelly, Gerrard Johnston, Ronan Johnston, Ciaran Keegan, Pat Leavy, Diarmuid Griffin (v/c), Shaun McElhone, Brian O'Connell (c), Clifford Richardson, Darragh O'Hagan, Paul O'Mahoney, Rory Rafter, David Whelan, Ian O'Sullivan, Derek Troy, Mark Kilgallon, Cian Quigley, Mike Finn, David Stynes, Ruairi Convery; RESULTS: IRE 4.7(31) def CAN 3.5(23), USA 2.5(17) def IRE 1.7(13), IRE 10.9(69) def SA 1.4(10), IRE 7.11(53) def Japan 1.0(6), PNG 5.4(34) def IRE 3.7(25), USA 10.5(65) def IRE 4.6(30)	Krizan Vekic	Diarmuid O Riain
2008	4th	Seán Fallon, Ray Colleran, Clifford Richardson, Garret Kelleher, Alan Lavin, Joe Cunnane, Padraig Hannon, Cian Quigley, Mike Finn, David Lally, John Enright, Michael Currane, Paul O'Mahony, Patrick Leavy, Diarmuid Griffin, Ray Saurin, Ian O'Sullivan Paddy Gibbs, Brian O'Connell, Denis Goggin, James Flavin, Alan Tierney, James O'Byrne, Stephen Keegan, David Walsh, Alex Whooley, Brian Currane, Liam Twoomey, Daire Ó hAodhagáin, Martin Ruane, Ciarán Keegan; RESULTS: SA 4.9(33) def IRE 5.2(32), NZ 8.9(57) def IRE 2.3(15), IRE 4.6(30) def CAN 12.2(14), IRE 13.20(98) def FIN 0.0(0), IRE 12.12(84) def SWE 1.0(6)	Roger Clarke	Ciarán Ó Headhra; Paul Ryan
2011	1st	Cian Quigley, Aidan Hickey, Clifford Richardson, Fergal McManus, John Heslin, Joe Cunnane, Paul Sharry, Alex Whooley, Mike Finn, Fearghal Purcell, John Enright, Darren Sheils, Barry Holland, Roch Hanmore, Philip Bredin, David McElhone, Larry Kavanagh, Manus Breathnach, Eoin Ó Súileabháin, Niall McDonagh, Joe Rocks, James Flavin, David Coffey, James O'Byrne, Seán McGuinness, John Tierney, Gerard Walls, Kevin O'Brien, Alan Coomey, David Stynes, Michael Carey, Brendan Nannery, Gerard Lenihan; RESULTS: IRE 14.9(93) def. East Timor 0.0(0), IRE 8.6(54) d. GB 1.0(6), IRE 15.14(104) d. SWE 1.0(6), IRE 11.6(72) d. DEN 1.3(9), IRE 5.16(46) d. NZ 2.1(13) *FINAL: IRE 8.5(53) d. PNG 5.5(35)	Tom Madigan	Ciarán Ó Headhra
2014	2nd			
2017	3rd			
Year	Finish	AFL Europe Championship	Coach	Manager
2010	1st			
2013	1st			
2016	2nd			
2019	3rd			
2022	1st			
Year	Finish	Transatlantic Cup	Coach	Manager
2024	1st			

== Women's International honours ==
Year	Finish	Atlantic Alliance Cup	Coach	Manager
2011	1st	Emma Kelly, Ciara McGurk, Aimee-Louise Hazley, Laura Corrigan, Natlie Behan, Marie Keating, Gillian Behan, Nuala O'Hagan, Emma Behan, Claire Cunningham Louise Loughlin, Ashlene Groogan, Fiona Cotter, Kate Fitzsimons, U. McKay, S. Ryan, N. Ryan, A. Sheils, Kerr, Aitken, Tracey; RESULTS: IRE 4.7(31) def CAN 1.2(8), IRE 19.13(127) def AUS 0.1(1), IRE 12.8(80) def PNG 2.0(12), IRE 5.5(35) def USA 2.4(16) *FINAL IRE 5.9(39) def CAN 1.2(8).	Andrew Hickey	Shaun Saurin
2014	2nd			
2017	1st			
Year	Finish	Transatlantic Cup	Coach	Manager
2024	1st			

=== Irish players selected for All-International Team ===
Year	Player
2017 Australian Football International Cup; Women's World Team	Carol Breen, Laura Corrigan, Clara Fitzpatrick, Colleen Quinn, Brendan Kelly
2017 Australian Football International Cup	Padraig Lucey, Paul O'Hallaron, Fiachra O'Dheasmhunaigh
2014 Australian Football International Cup; Women's World Team	Fiona Roarty, Paula Keatley, Laura Corrigan, Emma Kelly, Aimee Hazely
2014 Australian Football International Cup	Mike Finn, Brendan Browne, Padraig Lucey, David Stynes
2011 Australian Football International Cup; Women's World Team	Laura Corrigan, Natlie Behan, Marie Keating, Gillian Behan, Nuala O'Hagan, Louise Loughlin, Emma Kelly, Ashlene Groogan
2008 Australian Football International Cup	Mike Finn, Ian O'Sullivan, Cian Quigley
2005 Australian Football International Cup	Clifford Richardson, Mike Finn
2002 Australian Football International Cup	Michael Johnson, Aaron Flood, Liam O'Connor, David Stynes

== Ireland AFLW team ==
The growth of women's Australian rules football, chiefly through the expansion of the AFL Women's (AFLW) competition in Australia, has provided an outlet for a significant amount of Irish female Gaelic footballers to develop a professional career playing Australian football. In 2026 an Irish women's national team, to be selected from Irish footballers playing in the AFLW, will compete against Australia in the first representative fixture between the two nations. The team is coached by Colin O'Riordan.

Squad
No.	Name	Age	Club	County
1.	Aisling McCarthy	30	Fremantle Dockers	Tipperary
2.	Orlagh Lally	25	Fremantle Dockers	Meath
3.	Kayleigh Cronin	29	Adelaide Crows	Kerry
4.	Niamh Martin	25	Hawthorn	Tipperary
5.	Grace Kos	24	Greater Western Sydney Giants	Dublin
6.	Eilish O'Dowd	28	Greater Western Sydney Giants	Leitrim
7.	Sarah Rowe	31	Collingwood	Mayo
8.	Aine McDonagh	27	Hawthorn	Galway
9.	Orla O'Dwyer (C)	28	Brisbane Lions	Tipperary
10.	Bláithín Bogue	26	North Melbourne	Fermanagh
11.	Clara Fitzpatrick	35	Gold Coast Suns	Down
12.	Jennifer Dunne	26	Brisbane Lions	Dublin
13.	Vikki Wall	28	North Melbourne	Meath
14.	Erika O'Shea	24	North Melbourne	Cork
15.	Paris McCarthy	22	Sydney Swans	Kerry
17.	Dayna Finn	25	Carlton	Mayo
19.	Erone Fitzpatrick	25	Carlton	Laois
20.	Niamh McLaughlin	32	Gold Coast Suns	Donegal
21.	Amy Gavin Mangan	27	North Melbourne	Offaly
22.	Rachel Kearns	29	Geelong Cats	Mayo
23.	Niamh Kelly	30	Adelaide Crows	Mayo
24.	Amy Boyle-Carr	25	Adelaide Crows	Donegal
25.	Aisling Reidy	25	Carlton	Clare
26.	Neasa Dooley	26	Brisbane Lions	Kildare
45.	Aishling Moloney	28	Geelong Cats	Tipperary
INJ	Sinead Goldrick	36	Melbourne	Dublin
INJ	Grace Kelly	32	Adelaide Crows	Mayo
INJ	Tanya Kennedy	33	Sydney Swans	Donegal

INJ - Player forced to withdraw from Original Squad due to Injury

=== Support Staff ===
Coach: Colin O'Riordan (Sydney)

Assistants: Craig Starcevich (Brisbane), Tadhg Kennelly (GWS academy, Irish Sydney premiership player), Áine Tighe (Irish Fremantle player), Elise Coventry (Geelong assistant)

== Current Irish AFLW Players ==
All Irish Players Currently Playing in the AFLW 2026

Club	Name	County
Adelaide Crows	Kayleigh Cronin	Kerry
Adelaide Crows	Grace Kelly	Mayo
Adelaide Crows	Niamh Kelly	Mayo
Adelaide Crows	Amy Boyle-Carr	Donegal
Brisbane Lions	Neasa Dooley	Kildare
Brisbane Lions	Jennifer Dunne	Dublin
Brisbane Lions	Orla O'Dwyer	Tipperary
Brisbane Lions	Caitlin Kennedy	Tipperary
Carlton	Dayna Finn	Mayo
Carlton	Aisling Reidy	Clare
Carlton	Erone Fitzpatrick	Laois
Carlton	Síofra O'Connell	Clare
Collingwood	Sarah Rowe	Mayo
Collingwood	Ellie Brady	Cavan
Collingwood	Kellyann Hogan	Waterford
Essendon	Emma Dineen	Kerry
Fremantle Dockers	Orlagh Lally	Meath
Fremantle Dockers	Aisling McCarthy	Tipperary
Fremantle Dockers	Áine Tighe	Leitrim
Fremantle Dockers	Aoife Healy	Cork
Geelong Cats	Rachel Kearns	Mayo
Geelong Cats	Aishling Moloney	Tipperary
Geelong Cats	Emma Murray	Waterford
Geelong Cats	Kate Kenny	Offaly
Gold Coast Suns	Clara Fitzpatrick	Down
Gold Coast Suns	Niamh McLaughlin	Donegal
Greater Western Sydney Giants	Grace Kos	Dublin
Greater Western Sydney Giants	Eilish O'Dowd	Leitrim
Hawthorn	Aine McDonagh	Galway
Hawthorn	Hannah Looney	Cork
Hawthorn	Niamh Martin	Tipperary
Melbourne	Sinead Goldrick	Dublin
Melbourne	Aoife Horisk	Tyrone
Melbourne	Blaithin Mackin	Armagh
North Melbourne	Vikki Wall	Meath
North Melbourne	Sarah Wall	Meath
North Melbourne	Erika O'Shea	Cork
North Melbourne	Bláithín Bogue	Fermanagh
North Melbourne	Amy Gavin Mangan	Offaly
Richmond Tigers	Aoibhin Cleary	Meath
Richmond Tigers	Ana Mulholland	Antrim
St Kilda	Saoirse Lally	Mayo
Sydney Swans	Tanya Kennedy	Donegal
Sydney Swans	Paris McCarthy	Kerry
Sydney Swans	Julie O'Sullivan	Kerry
Sydney Swans	Mary-Kate Lynch	Meath

== Current Irish AFL Players ==
Club	Name	County
Adelaide Crows	Mark Keane	Cork
Brisbane Lions	Ben Murphy	Kerry
Brisbane Lions	Darragh Joyce	Kilkenny
Brisbane Lions	Conor McKenna	Tyrone
Carlton	Rob Monahan	Kerry
Essendon	Cillian Bourke	Offaly
Geelong Cats	Mark O'Connor	Kerry
Geelong Cats	Oisín Mullin	Mayo
Geelong Cats	Cillian Burke	Kerry
Greater Western Sydney Giants	Callum Brown	Derry
Hawthorn	Conor Nash	Meath
St Kilda	Liam O'Connell	Cork
St Kilda	Kobe McDonald (2027)	Mayo
St Kilda	Eamonn Armstrong	Meath

== See also ==
- Australian rules football in Ireland
