= Joe Cunnane =

Irish Gaelic and Australian rules footballer

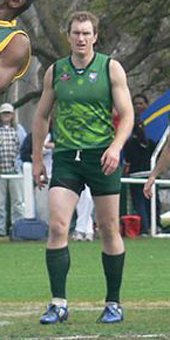
- Joe 2nd from right

Personal information
- Born: 4/12/1971 Tulsk, County Roscommon Ireland

Sport
- Sport: Gaelic football
Clubs
- Years: Club
- Tulsk GAA; Australasian GAA; Dublin Demons

Joe Cunnane is a former Gaelic footballer and Australian rules footballer who represented Ireland at the Australian Football International Cup and also appeared on two Irish football reality television shows.

== Playing career ==
=== Australian football ===
The Dublin Demons clubman was the ruckman on the Ireland national Australian rules football team which won the 2002 Australian Football International Cup. Cunnane was one of Ireland's best players in the final against Papua New Guinea. He was top scorer when Ireland won the 2001 Atlantic Alliance Cup, playing at full-forward and played in the forward line again in the 2008 Australian Football International Cup, reaching the semi-finals. Cunnane returned with the team for a third time to help them reclaim the 2011 Australian Football International Cup title.

=== Gaelic football ===
Cunnane is a club member of the Gaelic Athletic Association team for his home town of Tulsk in Ireland, has also represented Victoria in the Australasian GAA Championships. He has appeared on The Craic Down Under on RTÉ Television and was selected on TV channel TG4's "The Underdogs" team that narrowly lost to Dublin in 2003.
