= Michael Johnson (Gaelic footballer) =

Antrim Gaelic footballer

Michael 'Mickey' Johnson
Personal information
- Native name: Mícheál Mac Sheáin (Irish)
- Born: Antrim, Northern Ireland

Sport
- Sport: Gaelic football
- Position: Half back
Inter-county
- Years: County
- Antrim
Inter-county titles
- Ulster titles: 1

Michael "Mickey" Johnson is a former Gaelic footballer who played for the Antrim county team.

== Playing career ==
He represented Antrim at all levels and won an Ulster Under-21 Football Championship Medal in 1989. He also represented Antrim at senior level for 13 years. He retired in 2002 to concentrate on Aussie Rules. He went on to captain the Ireland national Australian rules football team, that won the 2001 Atlantic Alliance Cup and 2002 Australian Football International Cup. He was also selected on the All-Star Team. In 2008, he was selected on the Ireland Masters International Rules Panel in Australia.
