= Fergal Bradshaw =

Irish Gaelic and Australian rules footballer

Personal information
- Born: Dublin Ireland

Sport
- Sport: Gaelic football
Clubs
- Years: Club
- Trinity Gaels; Dublin Demons

Fergal Bradshaw is a former Gaelic footballer and an Australian rules footballer. He played at minor level for the Dublin county team.

== Playing career ==
The Trinity Gaels GAA clubman represented the Dublin county team at minor level in 1996. He played Australian Football with the Dublin Demons and played on the Half-back line for the Ireland national Australian rules football team, that won the 2002 Australian Football International Cup and the 2001 Atlantic Alliance Cup.
