= 2005 Australian Football International Cup =

2005 AFL International Cup

Tournament details
- Host country: Australia
- Dates: 3 August – 13 August 2005
- Teams: 10

Final positions
- Champions: New Zealand (1st title)
- Runners-up: Papua New Guinea
- Third place: United States
- Fourth place: Ireland

The 2005 Australian Football International Cup was the second time that the Australian Football International Cup tournament, an international Australian rules football competition was held.

The event was hosted by both Melbourne and Wangaratta, Australia, in 2005.

10 nations participated following the late withdrawal of both Nauru and Denmark and the introduction of Spain.

All sides were scheduled to play 4 games, after which the top 4 sides played off in semi-finals for a berth in the Grand Final decider. The Grand Final was between Papua New Guinea and New Zealand. Both sides went through the tournament undefeated. It was played as a curtain raiser to an official Australian Football League premiership season match and was replayed on Fox Sports (Australia) and the Fox Footy Channel.

New Zealand were crowned international champions for the first time.

== Tournament results ==
=== Round 1 ===
(Wednesday 3 August 2005)

Japan	88–17	Spain	Stadium: Murphy Reserve, Port Melbourne, Victoria
13; 10	Goals; Behinds	2; 5	Stadium: Murphy Reserve, Port Melbourne, Victoria

(Republic of Ireland); Ireland	31–23	Canada	Stadium: Murphy Reserve, Port Melbourne, Victoria
4; 7	Goals; Behinds	3; 5	Stadium: Murphy Reserve, Port Melbourne, Victoria

United States	62–34	South Africa	Stadium: Murphy Reserve, Port Melbourne, Victoria
9; 8	Goals; Behinds	4; 10	Stadium: Murphy Reserve, Port Melbourne, Victoria

New Zealand	56–22	(United Kingdom); Great Britain	Stadium: Murphy Reserve, Port Melbourne, Victoria
8; 8	Goals; Behinds	3; 4	Stadium: Murphy Reserve, Port Melbourne, Victoria

Papua New Guinea	59–42	Samoa	Stadium: Murphy Reserve, Port Melbourne, Victoria
8; 11	Goals; Behinds	6; 6	Stadium: Murphy Reserve, Port Melbourne, Victoria

=== Round 2 ===
(Friday 5 August 2005)

New Zealand	105–3	Spain	Stadium: Murphy Reserve, Port Melbourne, Victoria
15; 15	Goals; Behinds	0; 3	Stadium: Murphy Reserve, Port Melbourne, Victoria

Papua New Guinea	41–27	Canada	Stadium: Murphy Reserve, Port Melbourne, Victoria
5; 11	Goals; Behinds	4; 3	Stadium: Murphy Reserve, Port Melbourne, Victoria

(United States); USA	17–13	(Republic of Ireland); Ireland	Stadium: Murphy Reserve, Port Melbourne, Victoria
2; 5	Goals; Behinds	1; 7	Stadium: Murphy Reserve, Port Melbourne, Victoria

South Africa	30–28	Japan	Stadium: Murphy Reserve, Port Melbourne, Victoria
4; 6	Goals; Behinds	4; 4	Stadium: Murphy Reserve, Port Melbourne, Victoria

Samoa	78–8	(United Kingdom); Great Britain	Stadium: Murphy Reserve, Port Melbourne, Victoria
12; 6	Goals; Behinds	1; 2	Stadium: Murphy Reserve, Port Melbourne, Victoria

=== Round 3 ===
(Sunday 7 August 2005)

(Republic of Ireland); Ireland	69–10	South Africa	Stadium: TEAC Oval, Port Melbourne, Victoria
10; 9	Goals; Behinds	1; 4	Stadium: TEAC Oval, Port Melbourne, Victoria

(United States); USA	41–12	Spain	Stadium: TEAC Oval, Port Melbourne, Victoria
5; 11	Goals; Behinds	2; 0	Stadium: TEAC Oval, Port Melbourne, Victoria

Samoa	46–42	Canada	Stadium: Optus Oval, Carlton, Victoria
7; 4	Goals; Behinds	6; 6	Stadium: Optus Oval, Carlton, Victoria

New Zealand	79–6	Japan	Stadium: TEAC Oval, Port Melbourne, Victoria
11; 13	Goals; Behinds	1; 0	Stadium: TEAC Oval, Port Melbourne, Victoria

Papua New Guinea	59–14	(United Kingdom); Great Britain	Stadium: Optus Oval, Carlton, Victoria
8; 11	Goals; Behinds	2; 2	Stadium: Optus Oval, Carlton, Victoria

=== Round 4 ===
(Tuesday 9 August 2005)

(Republic of Ireland); Ireland	53–6	Japan	Stadium: City Oval, Wangaratta, Victoria
7; 11	Goals; Behinds	1; 0	Stadium: City Oval, Wangaratta, Victoria

(United Kingdom); Great Britain	25–23	Canada	Stadium: The Showgrounds, Wangaratta, Wangaratta, Victoria
3; 7	Goals; Behinds	3; 5	Stadium: The Showgrounds, Wangaratta, Wangaratta, Victoria

Papua New Guinea	47–46	(United States); USA	Stadium: City Oval, Wangaratta, Victoria
7; 5	Goals; Behinds	7; 4	Stadium: City Oval, Wangaratta, Victoria

South Africa	84–13	Spain	Stadium: City Oval, Wangaratta, Victoria
12; 12	Goals; Behinds	2; 1	Stadium: City Oval, Wangaratta, Victoria

New Zealand	98–27	Samoa	Stadium: The Showgrounds, Wangaratta, Wangaratta, Victoria
16; 2	Goals; Behinds	4; 3	Stadium: The Showgrounds, Wangaratta, Wangaratta, Victoria

=== Ladder after four rounds ===
Pos	Team	Pld	W	L	PF	PA	PP
1	New Zealand	4	4	0	338	58	582.8
2	Papua New Guinea	4	4	0	206	129	159.7
3	Ireland	4	3	1	166	56	296.4
4	United States	4	3	1	166	106	156.6
5	Samoa	4	2	2	193	207	93.2
6	South Africa	4	2	2	158	172	91.9
7	Japan	4	1	3	128	179	71.5
8	Great Britain	4	1	3	69	216	31.9
9	Canada	4	0	4	115	143	80.4
10	Spain	4	0	4	45	318	14.2

=== Semifinals ===
(Thursday 11 August 2005)

New Zealand	64–46	(United States); USA	Stadium: Murphy Reserve, Port Melbourne, Victoria
10; 4	Goals; Behinds	7; 4	Stadium: Murphy Reserve, Port Melbourne, Victoria

Papua New Guinea	34–25	(Republic of Ireland); Ireland	Stadium: Murphy Reserve, Port Melbourne, Victoria
5; 4	Goals; Behinds	3; 7	Stadium: Murphy Reserve, Port Melbourne, Victoria

=== Qualifying finals round ===
(Thursday 11 August 2005)

Canada	Canada won by forfeit	Spain	Stadium: Murphy Reserve, Port Melbourne, Victoria

(United Kingdom); Great Britain	63–23	Japan	Stadium: Murphy Reserve, Port Melbourne, Victoria
9; 9	Goals; Behinds	3; 5	Stadium: Murphy Reserve, Port Melbourne, Victoria

Samoa	50–21	South Africa	Stadium: Murphy Reserve, Port Melbourne, Victoria
7; 8	Goals; Behinds	3; 3	Stadium: Murphy Reserve, Port Melbourne, Victoria

=== Minor placing finals ===
(Saturday 13 August 2005)

Seventh place
Seventh place	Canada	29–18	South Africa	Stadium: Optus Oval, Port Melbourne, Victoria
Seventh place	4; 5	Goals; Behinds	2; 6	Stadium: Optus Oval, Port Melbourne, Victoria

Fifth place
Fifth place	Samoa	27–15	(United Kingdom); Great Britain	Stadium: TEAC Oval, Port Melbourne, Victoria
Fifth place	3; 9	Goals; Behinds	2; 3	Stadium: TEAC Oval, Port Melbourne, Victoria

Ninth place
Ninth place	Japan	73–13	Spain	Stadium: Optus Oval, Port Melbourne, Victoria
Ninth place	11; 7	Goals; Behinds	2; 1	Stadium: Optus Oval, Port Melbourne, Victoria

Third place
Third place	(United States); USA	65–30	(Republic of Ireland); Ireland	Stadium: TEAC Oval, Port Melbourne, Victoria
Third place	10; 5	Goals; Behinds	4; 6	Stadium: TEAC Oval, Port Melbourne, Victoria

=== Grand final ===
(Saturday 13 August 2005)

New Zealand	50–32	Papua New Guinea	Stadium: Melbourne Cricket Ground; Attendance: 48,287
7; 8	Goals; Behinds	5; 2	Stadium: Melbourne Cricket Ground; Attendance: 48,287

The grand final was replayed on Fox Sports (Australia) and the Fox Footy Channel.

The best and fairest medal was awarded to New Zealand's James Bowden.

Note: the grand final was played as a curtain-raiser to the round 20 AFL match between Collingwood vs Carlton, so this figure is the total crowd for the match, although not all spectators were inside the stadium at the start or conclusion of the curtain-raiser event.

== Final standings ==
1. New Zealand
2. Papua New Guinea
3. (United States) USA
4. (Republic of Ireland) Ireland
5. Samoa
6. (United Kingdom) Great Britain
7. Canada
8. South Africa
9. Japan
10. Spain

== 2005 Australian Football International Cup All Stars Team ==
Like the All-Australian Team in the Australian Football League, a team selected from the best players in the International Cup was selected. Team members were unplaced and not allocated to any specific field position.

Player	Nation	Club
Navu Maha	Papua New Guinea	Centrals
David Gavara-Nanu	Papua New Guinea	New Ireland
Stanley Tapend	Papua New Guinea	Enga
Alister Sioni	Papua New Guinea	West New Britain
Richard Bradley	New Zealand	Eastern Blues
Craig Ashton	New Zealand	Takapuna Eagles
James Bowden	New Zealand	Eastern Blues
Andrew Congalton	New Zealand	Takapuna Eagles
Todd Danks	New Zealand	North Shore Tigers
James Brunmeier	United States	Milwaukee Bombers
Donnie Lucero	United States	Orange County Bombers
Michito Sakaki	Japan	Waseda University
Mtutuzeli Hlomela	South Africa	Eldorado Park
Steven Malinga	South Africa	Itoseng
Clifford Richardson	(Republic of Ireland) Ireland	Edinburgh Old Town Bloods
Mike Finn	(Republic of Ireland) Ireland	
Jonny Boyle	(United Kingdom) Great Britain	West London Wildcats
Jose Francisco Lorente	Spain	Madrid Bears
Fia Tootoo	Samoa	Moorabbin Kangaroos / Fasitoo-Uta Tigers
Mateta Kirisome	Samoa	Fasitoo-Uta Tigers
Rob McEwan	Canada	Windsor Mariners
Paul Loghanne	Canada	Mississauga Demons

=== Tournament Best & Fairest winners ===
Player	Nation	Club
Navu Maha	Papua New Guinea	Centrals
Fia Tootoo	Samoa	Moorabbin Kangaroos / Fasitoo-Uta Tigers
