= Trinity Gaels GAA =

Gaelic games club in County Dublin, Ireland

Trinity Gaels
- Gael na Tríonóide
- Founded: 1975
- County: Dublin
- Nickname: Trinity
- Colours: Red and Black
- Grounds: Drumnigh Road, Portmarnock
- Coordinates: 53°24′53.13″N 6°09′52.40″W

Playing kits
Standard colours

Trinity Gaels (Irish: Gael na Tríonóide) is a Gaelic Athletic Association club based in Donaghmede in Dublin, Ireland. Trinity Gaels were founded in 1975 to cater for the growing population in the Donaghmede area. The club got their name from the local Roman Catholic parish name, the parish of the Holy Trinity. Gaels won the Dublin Intermediate Football Championship in 1994 and therefore qualified to senior status. They also won the Intermediate Hurling championship and qualified for senior status. They have since fallen back to intermediate football and have remained there for the last decade or so, while the hurling side of the club dropped alarmingly to the lowest levels of Junior. Trinity Gaels played in Fr Collins Park, Hole in the Wall Road, where they still train their younger teams, until the middle of the 2006 season when they moved to new purpose-built grounds including clubhouse and floodlit pitches on Drumnigh Road. They also play matches and train at Donaghmede Park. A book entitled "Trinity Gaels – a look back through the last years", was launched at the Hilton Hotel, Malahide Road on 15 January 2007 to celebrate 30 years of the club's existence.

== Honours ==
- 1982 National Hurling Feile title
- 1986 Dublin Minor Football League Division One winners
- 1988 Dublin Junior Football Championship winners
- 1994 Dublin Intermediate Football Championship winners
- 1994 Dublin Junior Hurling Championship winners
- 1994 Dublin Intermediate Camogie Championship winners
- 1995 Dublin Intermediate Hurling League and Dublin Intermediate Hurling Championship double
- 1999 Dublin AFL Division 2: winners
- 2007 Dublin AFL Div. 8 Winners & Murphy Cup Winners
- 2008 Dublin AFL Div. 7 Winners & Murphy Cup winners
- 2010 Division 6 Football Feile winners & Dublin Division 7 Football League
- 2011 Dublin Division 8 football Feile winners
- 2017 Dublin AFL Div. 4
- 2017 Dublin Junior D Hurling Championship Winner
- 2024 Dublin AHL Div. 7 Winners

== Notable players ==
- Fergal Bradshaw, former minor intercounty player
- Vinnie Murphy, former Dublin Gaelic footballer
