= Donal Boylan =

Irish Gaelic and Australian rules footballer

Personal information
- Native name: Dónall Ó Baíolláin (Irish)

Sport
- Sport: Gaelic football
- Position: Half Forward
Clubs
- Years: Club
- Glenullin GAC; Belfast redbacks
Inter-county
- Years: County
- 2001: Derry

Donal Boylan is a former Gaelic footballer, who played for the Derry county team, as well as an Australian rules footballer.

== Playing career ==
The Glenullin GAC clubman represented Derry GAA at underage level and played senior football for Derry in the 2001 National Football League (Ireland) campaign. Boylan played Full-forward for the Ireland national Australian rules football team, that won the 2002 Australian Football International Cup.
