= Tulsk =

Village in County Roscommon, Ireland

Tulsk Tuilsce (Irish)
- Village
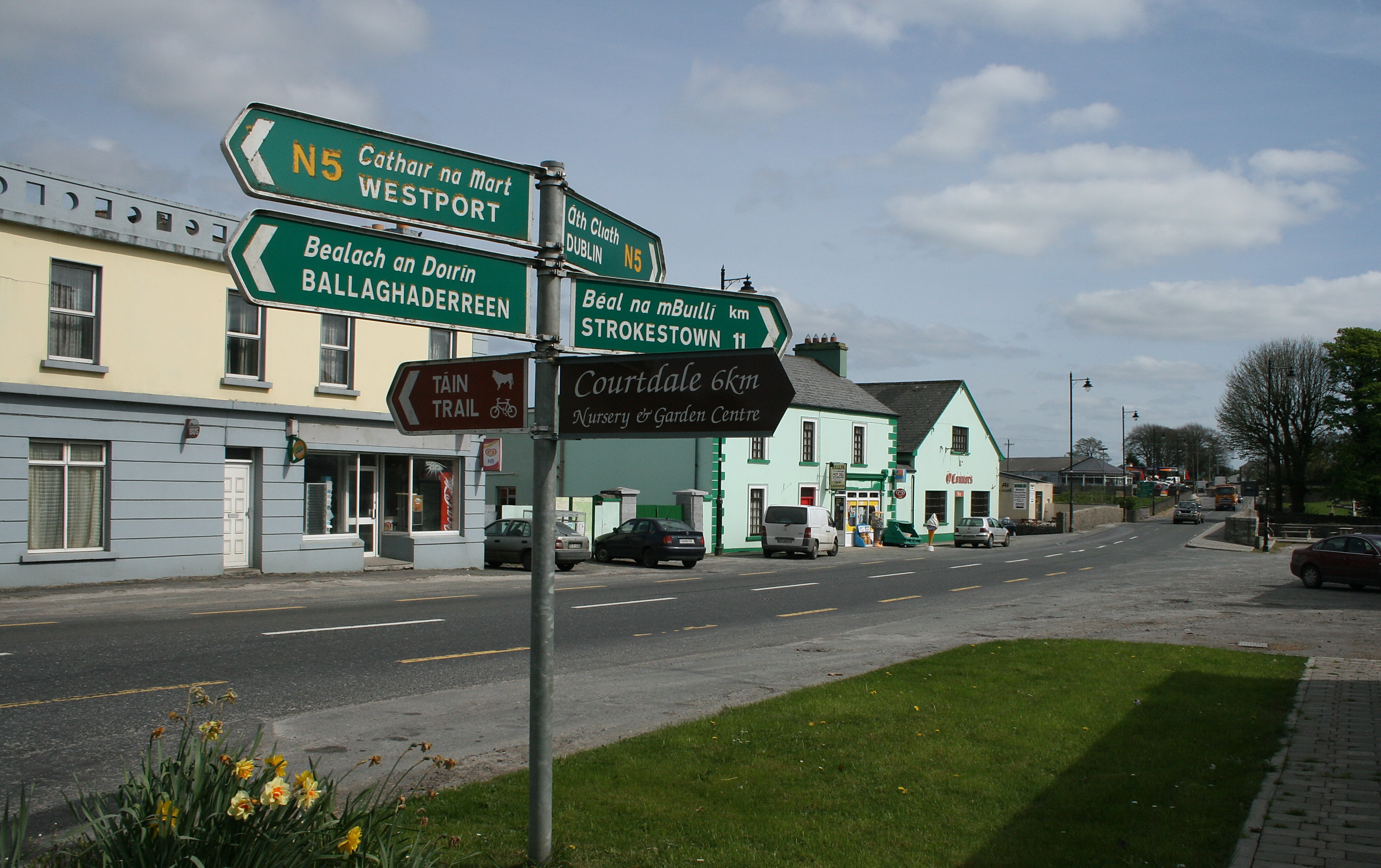

- Location in Ireland
- Coordinates: 53°47′00″N 8°15′00″W
- Country: Ireland
- Province: Connacht
- County: County Roscommon
- Elevation: 60 m (200 ft)

Population (2016)
  - Total: 241
- Time zone: UTC+0 (WET)
  - Summer (DST): UTC-1 (IST (WEST))
- Irish Grid Reference: M835815

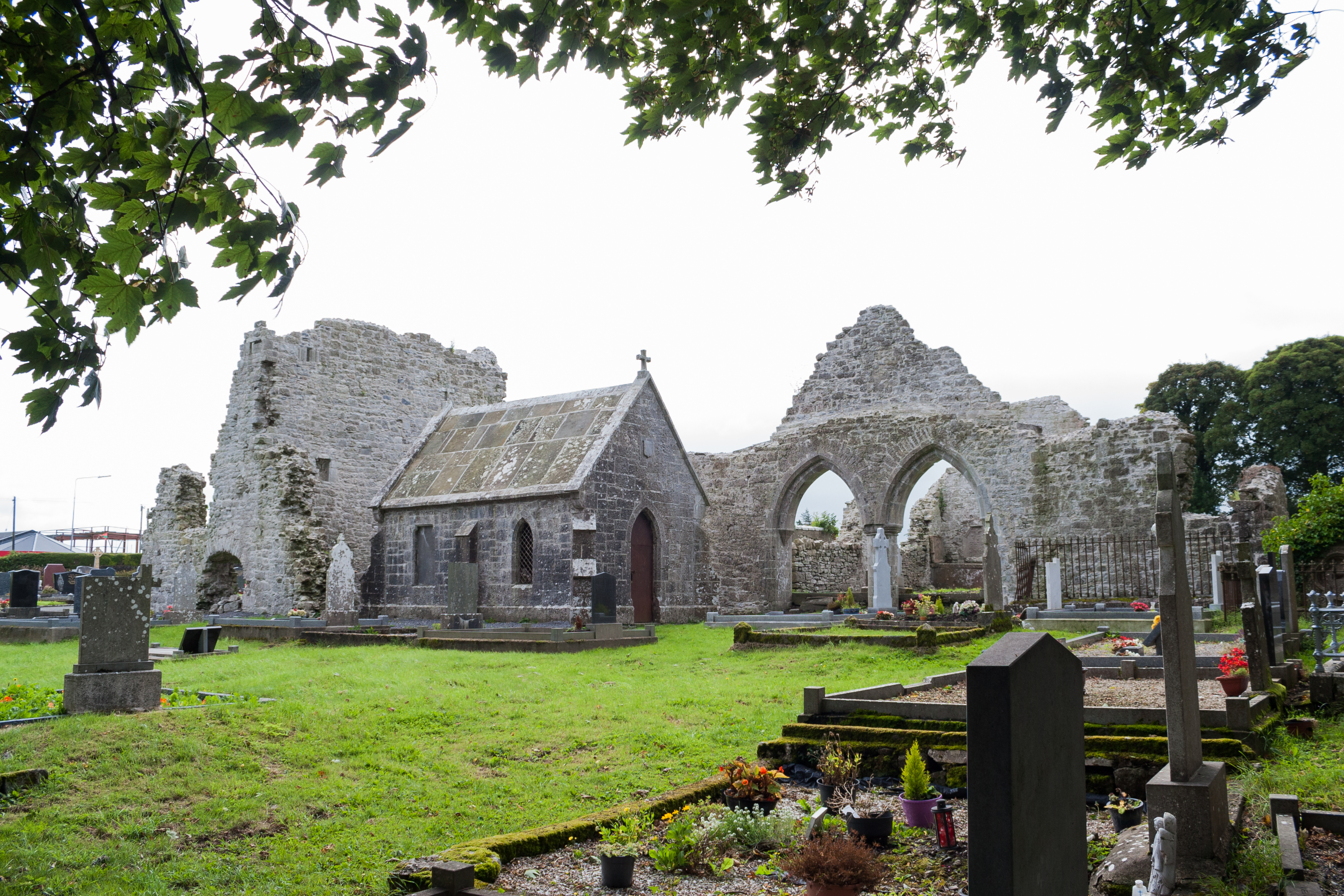
Tulsk Cemetery

Tulsk (Irish: Tuilsce) is a village in County Roscommon, Ireland. It is 19 km north of Roscommon town, on the N5 road between Strokestown and Bellanagare.

== Heritage ==
Near Tulsk is Cruachan, an Iron Age (Gaelic) royal palace. As recounted in the Táin Bó Cuailnge, it was the home of the Irish warrior Queen Medb (or Maeve), who was responsible for launching the Cattle Raid of Cooley. Archeological surveys have shed new light on the significance of the site and the 60 National Monuments found in the surrounding area. The results of archaeological surveys, carried out by John Waddell of the National University of Ireland in Galway, are incorporated into the exhibition rooms at Cruachan Aí Heritage Centre. The book Rathcroghan, Co Roscommon: an archaeological and geophysical survey in a ritual landscape, by John Waddell, Joe Fenwick and Kevin Barton, details the features and information about the Celtic royal site of Connacht.

== Archaeology ==
The Discovery Programme based its primary archaeological excavations and survey in the medieval village of Tulsk, and surrounding areas, from 2003 to 2009.

Archaeological research conducted by the Discovery Programme, Ireland's archaeological research institute funded by the Heritage Council, has examined the nature of Gaelic lordship and settlement in north Roscommon during the later medieval period, c. 1170–1650 AD. Since 2003, elements of this work have focused on the history and development of Tulsk as the principal residence of the O'Conor Roe (Rua) lords. Excavation on the ringfort in Tulsk village has revealed several periods of settlement, which include a medieval castle-building phase and an Elizabethan-period (c. 1560-1590s) occupation when the mound was included as part of the works associated with the garrisoning of Tulsk by Sir Richard Bingham, the ‘Flail of Connacht’.

In 2009, the archaeological team focused on a series of strata that explain the dating and development of the site. This work considered the ringfort that underlies the medieval tower and identified a boulder clay bank and ditch. It also showed the levels of soil introduced at a later date to build up the ringfort into a 'platform' of 'raised rath' form, sometime before the building of the medieval tower. These excavations also revealed prehistoric levels that extend back into the Mesolithic period, before the time of farming and when hunting and gathering prevailed. Information on finds are presented in the Cruachan Aí Heritage Centre in Tulsk.

== History ==
=== Parliamentary borough ===
Tulsk was previously a parliamentary borough, one of three in County Roscommon from the period 1663 to 1800, and was a constituency represented in the Irish House of Commons. Under the co-monarchs William III of England and Mary II of England, Tulsk was first represented in the Commons by William Caulfeild and William Neave in 1692. The year marked what was to be the beginning of an extended period of dominance for the Protestant Ascendancy. One of the two seats was effectively hereditary in the Caulfeild family.

=== Visit of Gabriel Beranger 1779 ===
In 1779, the artist Gabriel Beranger travelled throughout Ireland to paint the 'antiquities’ of Ireland for the Hibernian Antiquarian Society. On his travels he passed through Tulsk and Rathcroghan. He noted that on May Day he witnessed a scene ‘peculiar to this locality’:

It was that of ‘driving in all the black cattle from the surrounding plains to the great fort of Rathcroghan Mound, and bleeding them for the benefit of their health, while crowds of country people, having brought turf for firing, sat around and cooked the blood mixed with oaten meal, and when they could be procured, onions or scallions.

=== Entry in Samuel Lewis's 1837 Topographical Dictionary ===
In 1837, Samuel Lewis published A Topographical Dictionary of Ireland, which included a contemporary description of Tulsk. In the description, it is stated that:

"O'Conor Roe erected a castle here in 1406, and during the same century a Dominican monastery was founded either by MacDuil or O'Dowell, or by Phelim, son of Phelim Cleary O'Conor, who was interred here in 1448. The castle was for a long time one of the strongest in the province, and was garrisoned by the Earl of Kildare when he led his forces into this province in 1499."

Lewis states that the "monastery continued to flourish till the reign of Elizabeth" and that "A Dominican abbey was also founded at Toemonia, near the town, by O'Conor Roe which in the reign of Elizabeth was found to be in the occupation of Franciscans of the third order, on whose suppression it was granted by the Queen to Richard Kyndelinshe."

While Lewis stated that, as of 1837, the "town has dwindled into an insignificant village, consisting only of a few straggling cottages and one shop" it was noted that the "surrounding district is extremely rich and affords luxuriant pasturage".

=== Bianconi system ===
Started in 1815 by the Italian immigrant Charles Bianconi, the system of horse-drawn Bians grew from one initial route in Munster to daily travel of over 3,000 miles of road in Leinster, Munster and Connacht. Tulsk was one stop on a route from Ballina to Longford and vice versa. Leaving Ballina each morning at 10 a.m. (circa 1842), a mail coach with passengers would arrive in Tulsk at approx. 6 p.m, taking on average a further hour to reach Strokestown and reaching Longford at 9 p.m. In the opposite direction, a Bianconi car passed through Tulsk at approx. 8.50 each morning. It would then be due to arrive in Ballinagare one hour later. What travellers may have seen is open to question, but this was at a time when Tulsk was particularly ravaged by poverty and suffered death and emigration on a large scale in subsequent years. For instance, as recorded by Maynooth University Population Change Atlas, what we now know as Tulsk parish had a population of 11,101 in 1841. Ten years later that figure dropped to 6,955. In 1861 Tulsk's population had more than halved from that of the eve of the Famine, with 5,539 persons. The Bianconi system grew less popular in the 1850s when rail service began, but many routes such as this one continued for some time.

=== Outdoor rallies ===
In October 1903, the leader of the Irish Parliamentary Party John Redmond held a mass outdoor rally or "National Meeting" in Tulsk, for the people of County Roscommon. The party's dominant ideology was legislative independence for the country (Home Rule), with land reform also central to their mandate. On this particular inclement October Sunday, held in a field beside the village; Redmond addressed thousands on these two issues, both on local level and national level agendas. Tulsk was decided as the venue as it was geographically central to the county. Redmond arrived in the afternoon on a horse-drawn sidecar from Roscommon town, where he had spent the previous night, after a train journey from Dublin. The culture of mass meetings in 19th century Ireland had begun with Daniel O'Connell's quest for Catholic emancipation, and between 1880 and 1920 there had been (at least, as recorded) eight to 10 such meetings in Tulsk. At this time (1903) Tulsk parish's population has been recorded at 3,275, having dropped further from the 5,539 recorded in 1861.

=== World War I ===
A number of people from Tulsk served with the British Army during World War I. On Saturday 29 August 1914, an article appeared in the Leitrim Observer newspaper reporting on spies appearing in the districts of Roscommon. Along with two suspected Germans arrested on suspicion of "some evil design", over the Tarmonbarry bridge, the following was also printed:

"The Tulsk police arrested a foreigner, supposed to be a German, convenient to the royal ground at Rathcroghan on Wednesday last. He had a sketch book and a box of water colours in his possession but stated that he was only on a holiday, and was sketching for pleasure. We understand he was detained pending inquiries."

=== War of Independence ===
During the Irish War of Independence, on 14 November 1920 George Kelly, who was a shop keeper in Tulsk, drove to Roscommon town in his truck to collect goods for his store. His vehicle was apprehended and Kelly was arrested and held in Roscommon. Later that night the same truck made its way to Four Mile House in the possession of RIC officers and members of the Black and Tans. Here, in the townland of Rathconnor, John Conry was marched from his house and shot twice in the head, twice in the chest and once in the stomach. The killing was in reprisal for the Four Mile House ambush, which had occurred three weeks previously. His death was just one in a total of 58 fatalities associated with the Irish revolution in county Roscommon from the years 1917 – 1921 (from 'Counting Terror' by Eunan O'Halpin in 'Terror in Ireland 1916–1923' ed. David Fitzpatrick).

Thomas Brady, Intelligence Officer of 2nd Battalion, North Roscommon Brigade stated in the Bureau of Military History that while the RIC barracks in Tulsk had been evacuated in Autumn 1919 – Spring 1920, it wasn't burned to the ground until after Easter 1920, without any trouble; "We had no trouble in destroying [it]." The barracks had been a busy one for a rural outpost, and in 1911 had no fewer than 10 RIC officers stationed – this at a time of particular agrarian unrest in the area (albeit with a population of 784 in Tulsk DED at the time, as opposed to 215 in 2002 for instance – NUI Maynooth Irish Population Change Atlas (available online)).

== Sport ==
Tulsk GAA club was founded in 1970 when St. Brendans, Killina merged with St. Marys, Kilmurray to form one club for the whole parish. A new clubhouse and grounds were opened in 1985 and the playing area extended in 1997. The club has one pitch, a stand and a small training pitch. A second training pitch is located in Lisalway just outside Castleplunket. There is also a handball alley on the grounds.

A camogie team was founded in 2009 and won the Roscommon B final several times since its establishment.

== Facilities ==
Facilities in the village and surrounding areas include the Tulsk Macra na Feirme hall. This club was established originally in 1948 but in its present incarnation was re-established in 1987 after a lapse of ten years. The hall is also used for the Foroige Club, indoor camogie training, and Tidy Towns meetings. The hall has a stage, bathrooms and a kitchenette. Up until 2009 it was used as the play school.

Cruachan Aí is an interpretative and community centre for the Rathcroghan Celtic Royal Complex in Roscommon. It is located in the centre of the village.

== In popular culture ==
Irish folk singer Christy Moore, in his 1991 song "Encore", sings “Tulsk was just like being in hell”. At a 1979 concert in Tulsk, locals threw Moore's road crew into a river.

== Transport ==
Tulsk is situated on the N5 and is the halfway point between Dublin and Westport. Bus Éireann runs bus services to other major towns from the village.

Roscommon railway station, Carrick on Shannon railway station and Longford railway station are each a 20 km to 30 km drive away.

== Notable residents ==
- Joe Cunnane, footballer
- Percy French, poet, songwriter, engineer
- John O'Connor Power, Member for Mayo (1874–1885), was born in Clashaganny, Tulsk on Friday 13 February 1846

== See also ==
- List of towns and villages in Ireland
