= Clifford Richardson =

Irish Gaelic and Australian rules footballer

Personal information
- Nickname: Cliff
- Born: County Leitrim, Ireland
- Original team: Carrigallen GAA
- Height: 191 cm (6 ft 3 in)
- Weight: 98 kg (216 lb)
- Positions: Full forward 2nd Row (Rugby)

Club information
- Current club: Midland tigers/North Leinster Kangeroos; Carrigallen GAA

Playing career^{1}
Years	Club	Games (Goals)
2005–present	Edinburgh Old Town Bloods	
- Buccaneers RFC
- ^{1} Playing statistics correct to the end of 2010.

Clifford Richardson is a Leitrim Gaelic footballer and Australian rules footballer who represented Ireland at the Australian Football International Cup.

== Playing career ==
=== Gaelic football ===
The Carrigallen GAA clubman represented the Leitrim county team at Junior & senior level, playing in the 2010 FBD Insurance League & the National Football League (Ireland) Div. 4 campaign.

=== Australian football ===
Cliff played for the Ireland national Australian rules football team in the 2005 Australian Football International Cup, in Melbourne and returned with the team for the 2008 Australian Football International Cup, reaching the semi-finals on both occasions and was selected on the International Cup All Star Team in 2005. He returned with the Ireland squad to help them reclaim the 2011 Australian Football International Cup title, and kicked 3 goals in the tournament.

=== Rugby ===
He also plays semi-pro rugby for Buccaneers RFC in the AIL league.
