= Mike Finn =

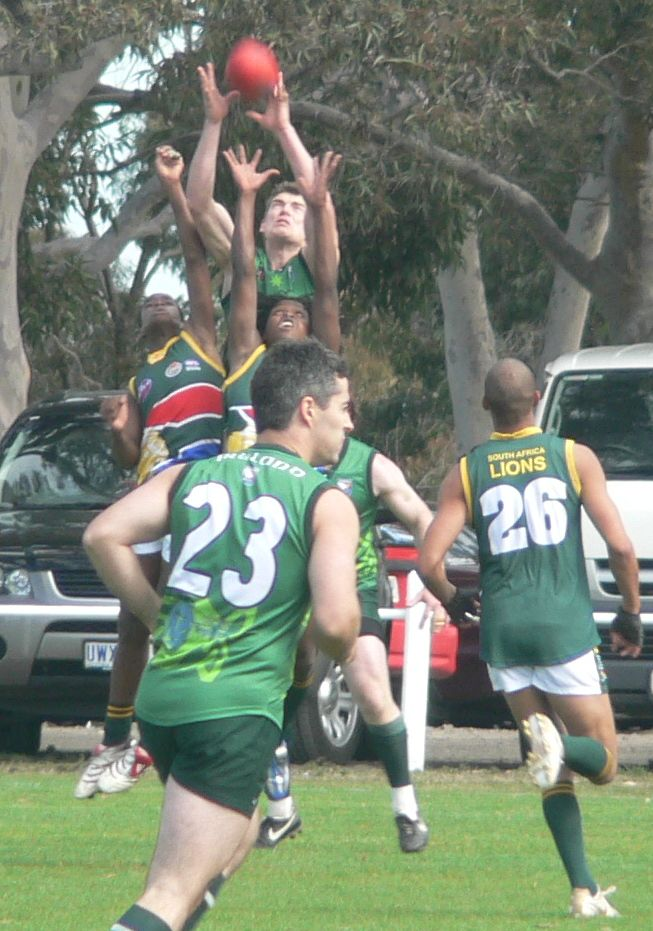
- Ireland's Mike Finn takes a spectacular mark over a pack of South African opponents in the 2008 AFL International Cup

Personal information
- Full name: Michael Finn
- Nickname: Irish
- Born: 18 May 1981 (age 45); Killarney, Ireland
- Original teams: Austin Stacks GAA; Kerry GAA
- Height: 2.00 m (6 ft 7 in)
- Weight: 107 kg (16 st 12 lb)
- Position: Ruck

Club information
- Current club: Heidelberg Football Club

Playing career^{1}
| Years | Club | Games (Goals) |
| 2002 – 2005 | Caulfield Bears | 42 (16) |
| 2007 – 2008 | Heidelberg | 34 (4) |
| 2009 | Carey Park | 17 (12) |
| 2010 – | Heidelberg | 218 (92) |
| Total | | 311 (144) |

International team honours
| Years | Team | Games (Goals) |
| 2005–2024 | Ireland | 85 |
- ^{1} Playing statistics correct to the end of 2011.

Mike Finn
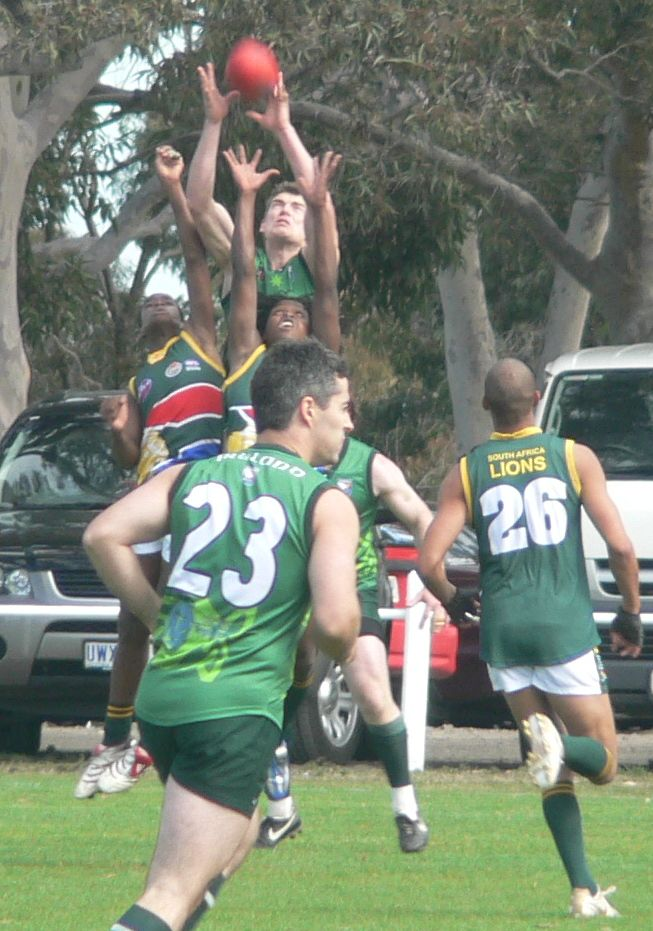

Personal information
- Native name: Micheal Mac Fhinn (Irish)
- Occupation: Architect

Sport
- Sport: Gaelic football
- Position: Midfield
Clubs
- Years: Club
- Austin Stacks; Victoria GAA
Club titles
- Kerry titles: 1 U-21
Inter-county
- Years: County
- pre2002: Kerry
Inter-county titles
- Munster titles: 1 U-21
- All-Irelands: 1 Senior Runner Carey Park - Premiership 2009. Club B&F 2009 Heidelberg - Premiership - 2007, 2008, 2016, 2023,2024. Runner Up - 2010, 2011, 2012, 2014, 2022 Club B&F 2011. Club Reserves B&F 2018, 2019 Caulfield Bears Club B&F 2006

Michael Finn is an Irish international amateur sportsperson who has represented Ireland in Australian rules football and basketball as well as Kerry GAA and Victoria in Gaelic football.

== Sporting career ==
=== Gaelic football ===
He represented Kerry GAA at all levels winning a Munster Under-21 Football Championship Medal in 2002 and was also part of the senior team that lost the 2002 All-Ireland Final. He played with the famous Austin Stacks club in Tralee, winning a Kerry Under-21 Football Championship medal in 2002. In Australia, he represented Victoria in 5 Australasian GAA Championships winning All Australian honours each year and Player of the Tournament in 2008.

=== Australian football ===
Finn played for Ireland national Australian rules football team in the 2005 Australian Football International Cup, in Melbourne and returned with the team for the 2008 Australian Football International Cup, reaching the semi-finals on both occasions. He went on to help Ireland reclaim the 2011 Australian Football International Cup title. He was Ireland's leading goalkicker scoring 4 goals in the final. He was selected on the International Cup All Star Team on 4 occasions and won the 'best & fairest player award' in 2008 & 2014. In his last international appearance in 2014 he was named captain of International Cup All Star Team.

He played suburban football for the Caulfield Bears (Southern Football League) and the Heidelberg Football Club (Northern Football League), winning league best and fairest awards in 2006 and 2011. As well as Reserve grade league Best & Fairest awards in 2018, 2019, 2022 & 2023

=== Basketball ===
He also represented the Ireland national basketball team 15 times.

== Gallery ==
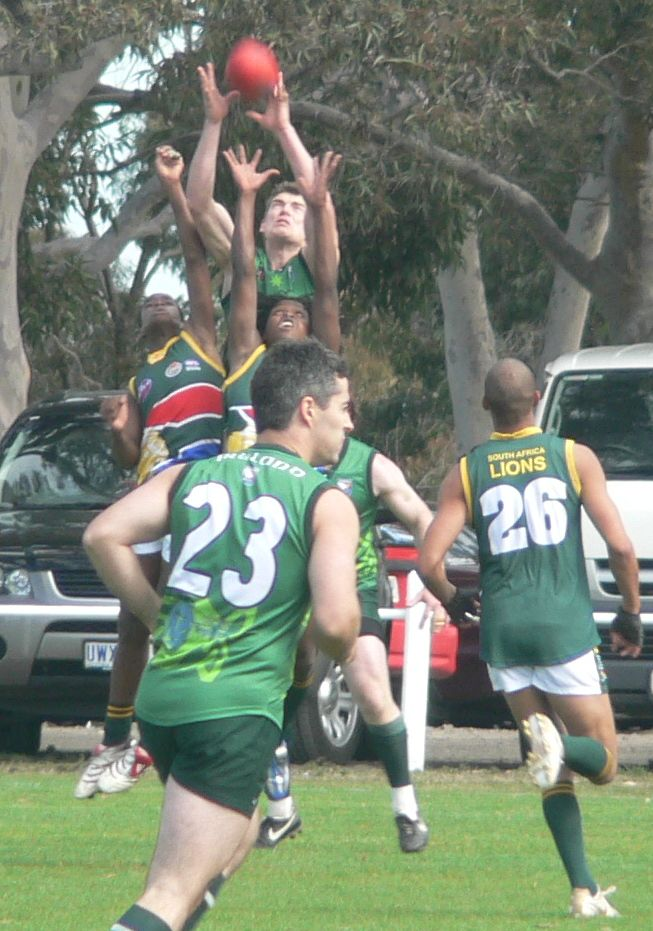
Contested mark against South Africa

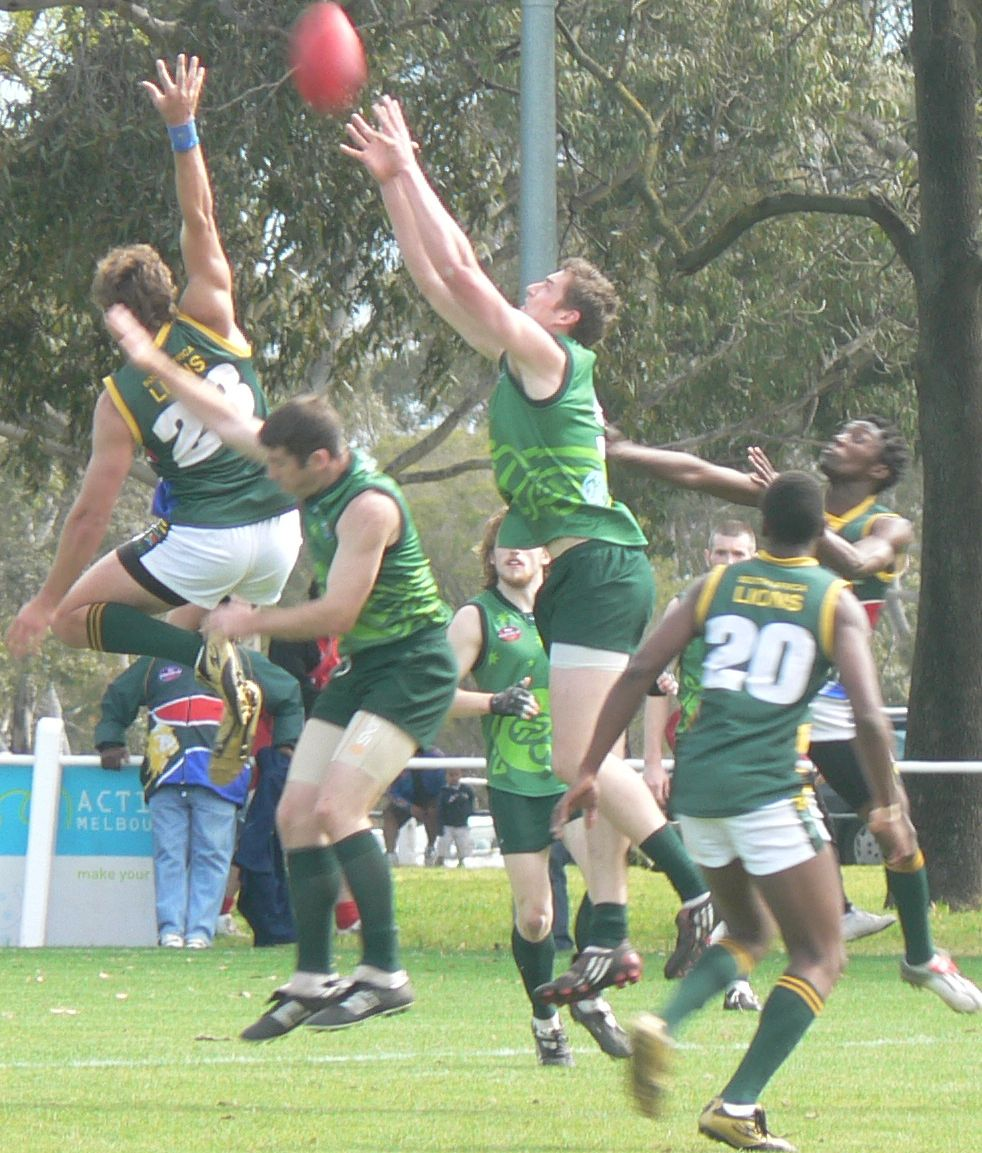
Another contested mark against South Africa

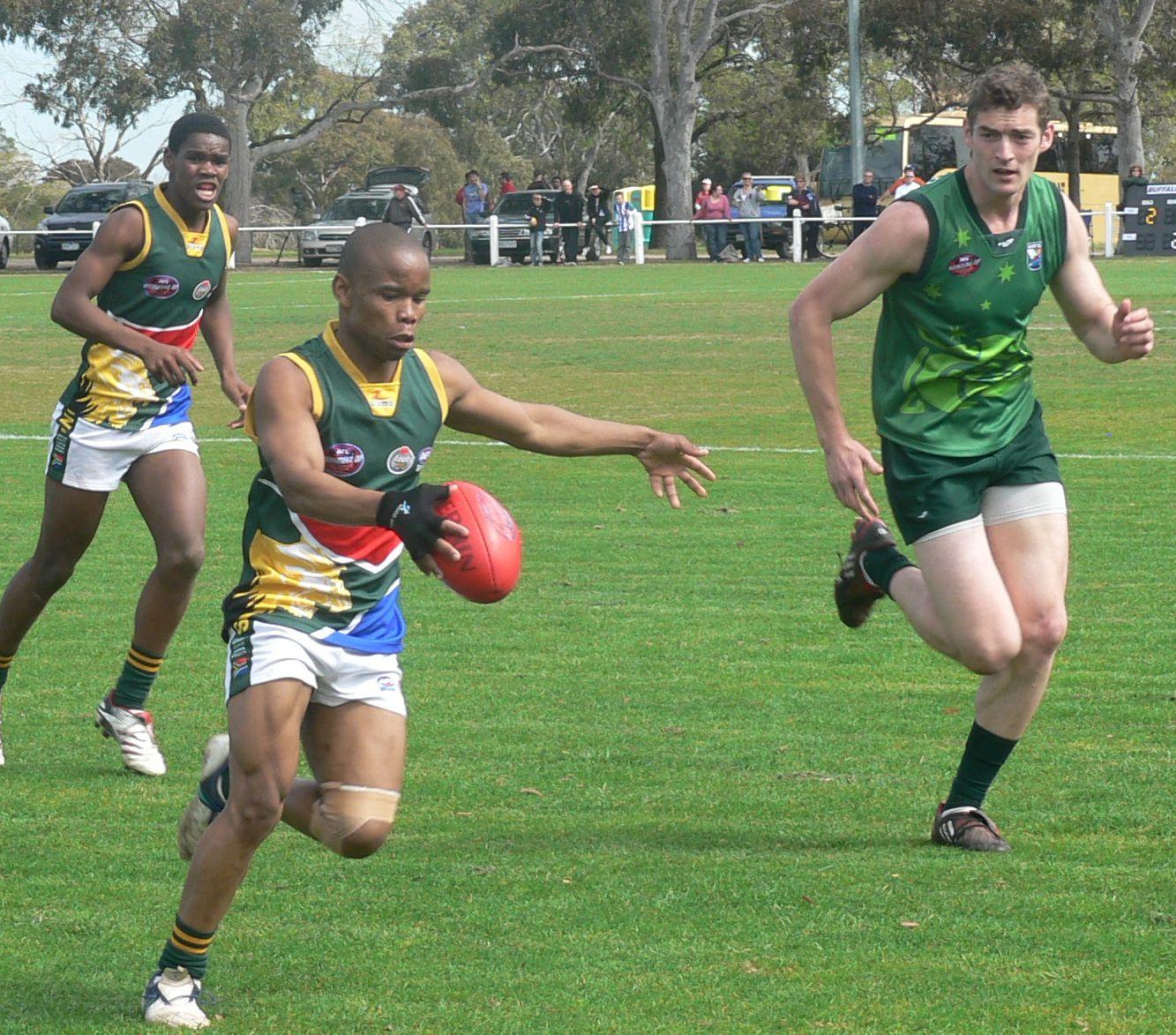
Providing chase as South African player kicks the ball

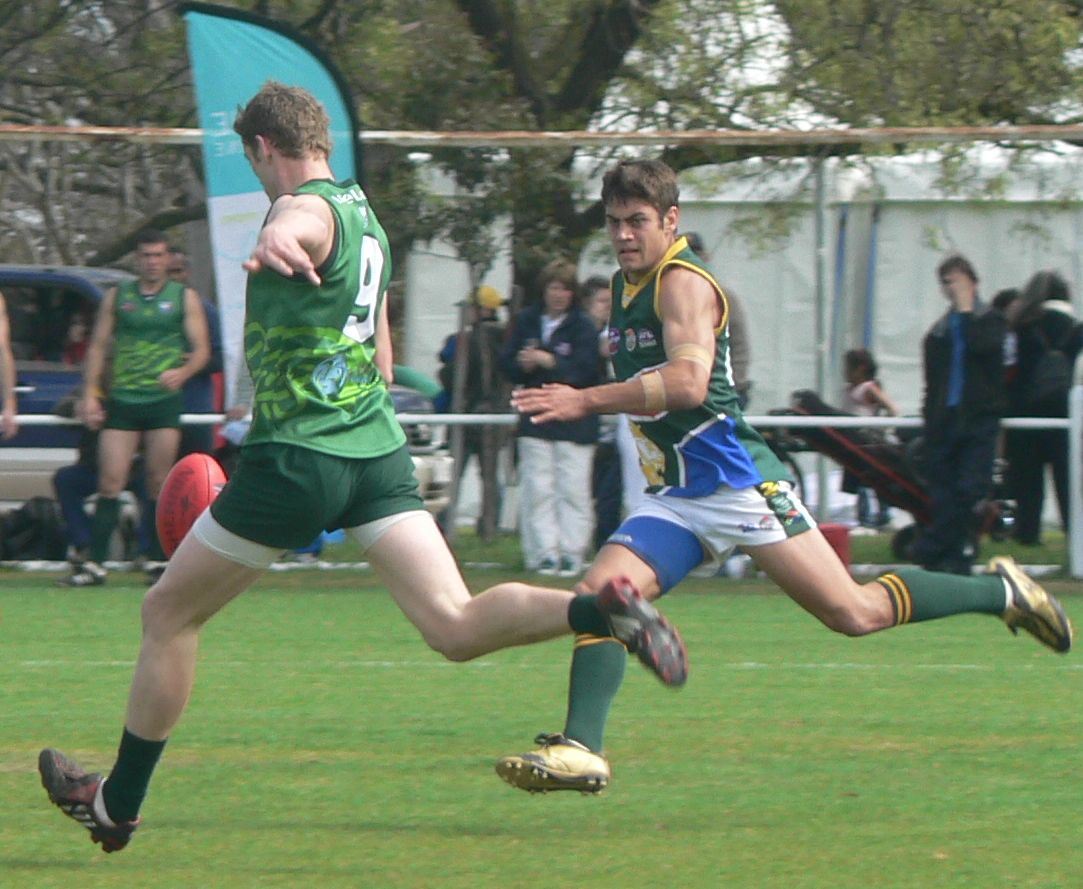
Kicking a running goal
