= Brian Shortall =

Irish Gaelic and Australian rules footballer

Personal information
- Nickname: "Shorts"

Sport
- Sport: Gaelic Football
- Position: Half-forward
Clubs
- Years: Club
- The Harps GAA; South Dublin Eagles
Inter-county
- Years: County
- Laois

Brian "Shorts" Shortall is a former Laois minor Gaelic footballer and Australian rules footballer.

== Playing career ==
Shortall is a native of Durrow, County Laois, who played his club football with The Harps GAA and represented Laois GAA at minor level, winning a Leinster MFC medal in 1998, before losing to a Tyrone team led by Cormac McAnallen in the All-Ireland MFC final. He played in all six games for the Ireland national Australian rules football team, that won the 2002 Australian Football International Cup.
