= Navu Maha =

Papua New Guinean sportsman

Navulani Maha (born 30 September 1974 in Alukuni, Papua New Guinea) is an all-round Papua New Guinean sportsman who has represented Papua New Guinea in cricket and Australian rules football. He is the son of the ICC's Chairman for Papua New Guinea.

Navu is 172 cm tall and weighs approximately 80 kg.

== Australian rules football ==
Navu is an Australian rules player for the Central club. He has represented Papua New Guinea on many occasions and was recently appointed captain of the national team.

At the 2005 Australian Football International Cup, he kicked the goal that sealed the Papua New Guinean team's appearance in Grand Final. After the cup, he was awarded joint winner of the Best and Fairest and became a member of the All-International side.

Navu also works as a local development officer.

== Cricket ==
Navu is an international cricketer who debuted in the ICC Trophy against Scotland in 1997. He is a left-handed batsman and spin bowler.

== Other sports ==
Navu also plays rugby union at club level.
