= Papua New Guinea national Australian rules football team =

National sports team

Papua New Guinea
- Nickname(s): The Mosquitoes
- Governing body: PNG Rules Football Council
- Head coach: David Lake
- Captain: John James Lavai

Rankings
- Current: 2nd (as of October 2022)

First international
- Papua New Guinea 24 - 5 Nauru (1976)

International Cup
- Appearances: 6 (first in 2002)
- Best result: 1st (2008, 2014, 2017)

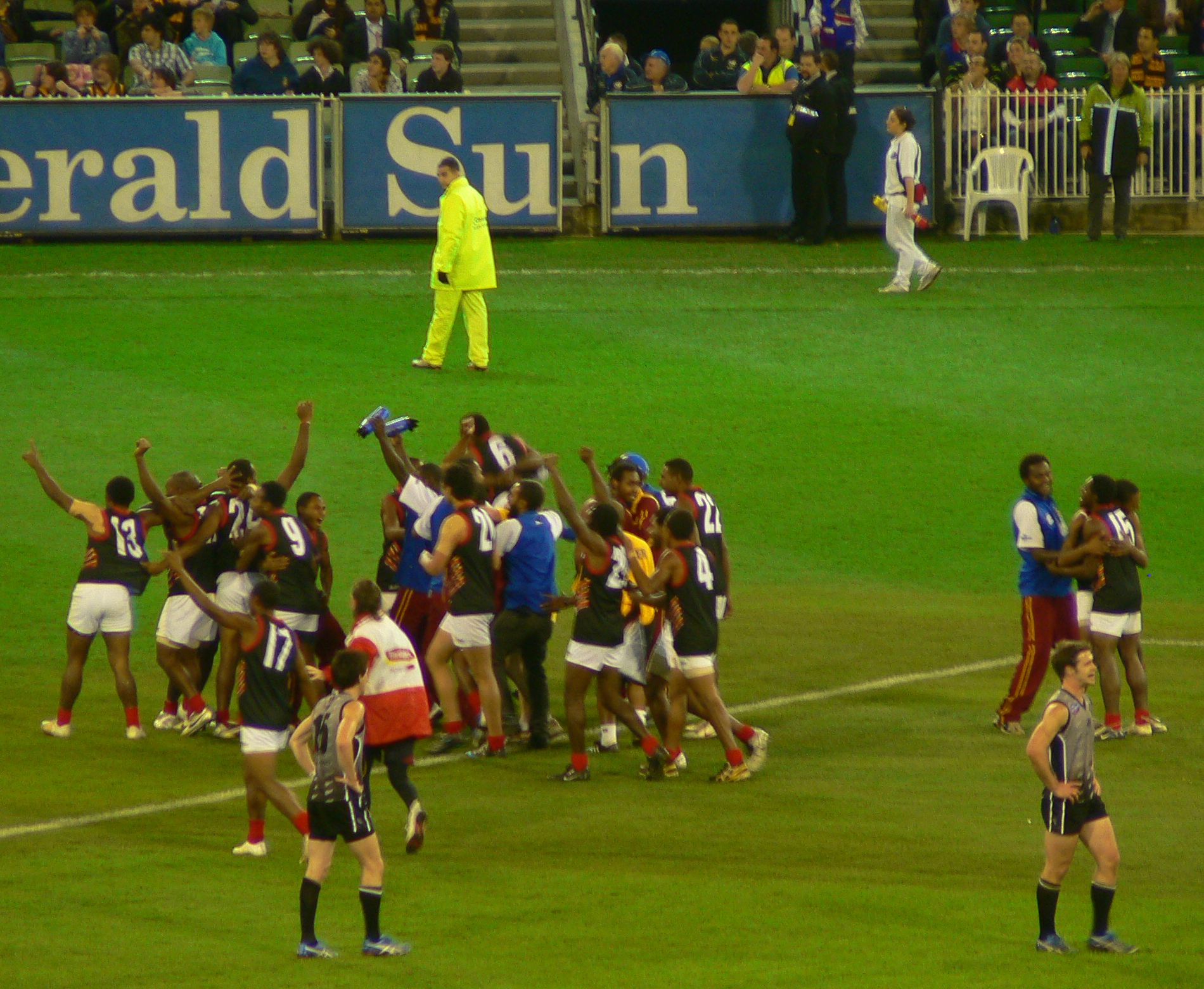
The Mosquitos celebrate winning the 2008 International Cup after the siren in a thriller at the MCG against New Zealand

The Papua New Guinea national Australian rules football team (nicknamed the Mosquitos (Tok Pisin: Moskitos) and for sponsorship purposes, the Telikom PNG Mosquitos) represents Papua New Guinea in the team sport of Australian rules football. It is one of the nation's most successful sporting teams, currently ranked 2nd in the world behind Australia.

The PNG Mosquitos are selected from the best born and raised male players from the clubs and teams of Papua New Guinea. Formed in the 1960s to participate in tests against popular teams from Australia, PNG debuted internationally in 1976 against Nauru in front of a crowd of over 10,000 at Sir Hubert Murray Stadium in Port Moresby which it won convincingly. It has a strong rivalry with Indigenous Australian teams, defeating them in the majority of their rare encounters including 1973, 1974 and 2009. It has remained a dominant international side, becoming the most decorated nation in international Australian Football, having won the most Australian Football International Cup titles (3 - 2008, 2014, 2017) and five medals including 3 silver medals (2002, 2005, 2011), featuring in every Grand Final since the inaugural tournament in 2002, as well as winning three gold medals at the Arafura Games.

== Identity ==
The team's nickname is the Mosquitos or "Mozzies" (aka Binatangs – local PNG name for small insects, similar to a mosquito). The moniker was formally adopted in 1993.

The Mosquito's guernsey has the kumul (raggiana bird-of-paradise), a national symbol of PNG (and element of the national flag of Papua New Guinea), in the national colours of red, black and yellow.

Prior to each match, the Mosquitos perform the 'Ole Ole' war dance (Video on YouTube).

== History ==
Prior to the independence of Papua New Guinea, various representative sides were assembled. The earliest, in 1956 representing Papua travelled to Australia and defeated regional representative Queensland sides from both Cairns and Innisfail.

In the late 60s and early 1970s, Australian clubs began to notice the rapid growth of the game in PNG and toured to compete against selections of local players but it wasn't until 1973 that the national team first began to form, mainly to tour Australia to play against indigenous sides.

As part of the celebrations for independence in 1975 the first full international test played between the national sides of Papua New Guinea and Nauru in front of a crowd of over 10,000 at Sir Hubert Murray Stadium in Port Moresby was won by PNG by 129 points. Despite significant planning, a reciprocal tour to Nauru planned for 1978 did not eventuate. One of the biggest challenges for the national team was that many of its best players were outside of Port Moresby (some of the strongest leagues were in the north, the highlands and New Britain) and lacked a means to travel to train and play in the team, let alone to fly overseas.

1977 saw Australian Under 17 squad tour Papua New Guinea, and the PNG team reciprocated in Adelaide, with Australia taking the honours in a close match.

In 1978 Australia's National Football League assumed control of the team and diverted all its funding to juniors and entered a side into the 1979 Teal Cup to create a talent pathway to VFL however the initiative was extremely unsuccessful with the Teal Cup team performing disastrously and no players recruited to the senior VFL. Due to no funding for senior international tests (PNG had to cancel its proposed 1979 tour of Nauru), it also caused the PNG government to withdraw all national funding for the sport. Following the withdrawal of the Australian administration and the collapse of the national competitions, an undermanned PNG team played mainly against teams mainly from Queensland.

In 1995 the Mosquitos competed internationally under the moniker of the Mosquitos at the Arafura Games in Darwin, Northern Territory. That year PNG won the gold medal of the International division defeating New Zealand. In the same competition, PNG also competed against sides from Nauru, Japan, Singapore and Hong Kong.

In 1996 the Mosquitoes played a curtain raiser to an Australian Football League match in Perth overwhelmingly defeating the Central Desert Eagles.

In 1997, PNG successfully defended their Arafura Games title again defeating New Zealand.

In 1999 won the gold medal again at the games, once again defeating New Zealand in the final.

In 2000, the Mosquitoes were invited to play New Zealand in a curtain raiser to a pre-season AFL match in Wellington, but were unable to raise the funds required.

In 2002, Papua New Guinea competed in the International Cup in Melbourne. PNG went through the competition undefeated only to lose to Ireland in the Grand Final.

A minor setback to the representation of the Mosquitos was the cancellation of the 2003 Arafura Games due to SARS fears.

Prior to the 2005 International Cup, AFL legend Mal Michael offered to play for the PNG side, but was ruled ineligible by the AFL. Although he was born in PNG, he did not satisfy the criteria since he had moved to Australia at too young an age. Despite Michael not being involved in the side, he tipped PNG to win the competition, hailing the strong growth in the local competitions.

In the 2005 International Cup, PNG again went through the competition unbeaten only to lose the Grand Final to a much improved New Zealand national team. Papua New Guinea's best and fairest player (from the 2005 International Cup) is Navu Maha. Navu also won the award for the best player in the 2005 International Cup series and captained both the 2002 and 2005 teams.

In early 2008, the national team secured its first major sponsor – Telikom PNG – which helped to fund the junior squads competing in Australia and the senior squad's International Cup campaign.

In the 2008 International Cup, PNG, captained by Alister Sioni again went through the competition unbeaten, this time defeating New Zealand in a thriller. 2 points up at the final siren, 17-year-old Amua Pirika kicked a goal after the siren. Donald Barry was best on the ground in the Grand Final. Overa Gibson was best and fairest in the 2008 International Cup. 4 Mosquitos were named in the All-International team – Donald Barry, Overa Gibson, Joe Lla and Stanis Susuve.

A spin-off team, the PNG Maruks club, formed in 2019 to play under different eligibility criteria, won the Asian Australian Football Championships in 2019 in their debut year.

== International competition ==
=== International Cup ===
- 2002: 2nd
- 2005: 2nd
- 2008: 1st
- 2011: 2nd
- 2014: 1st
- 2017: 1st
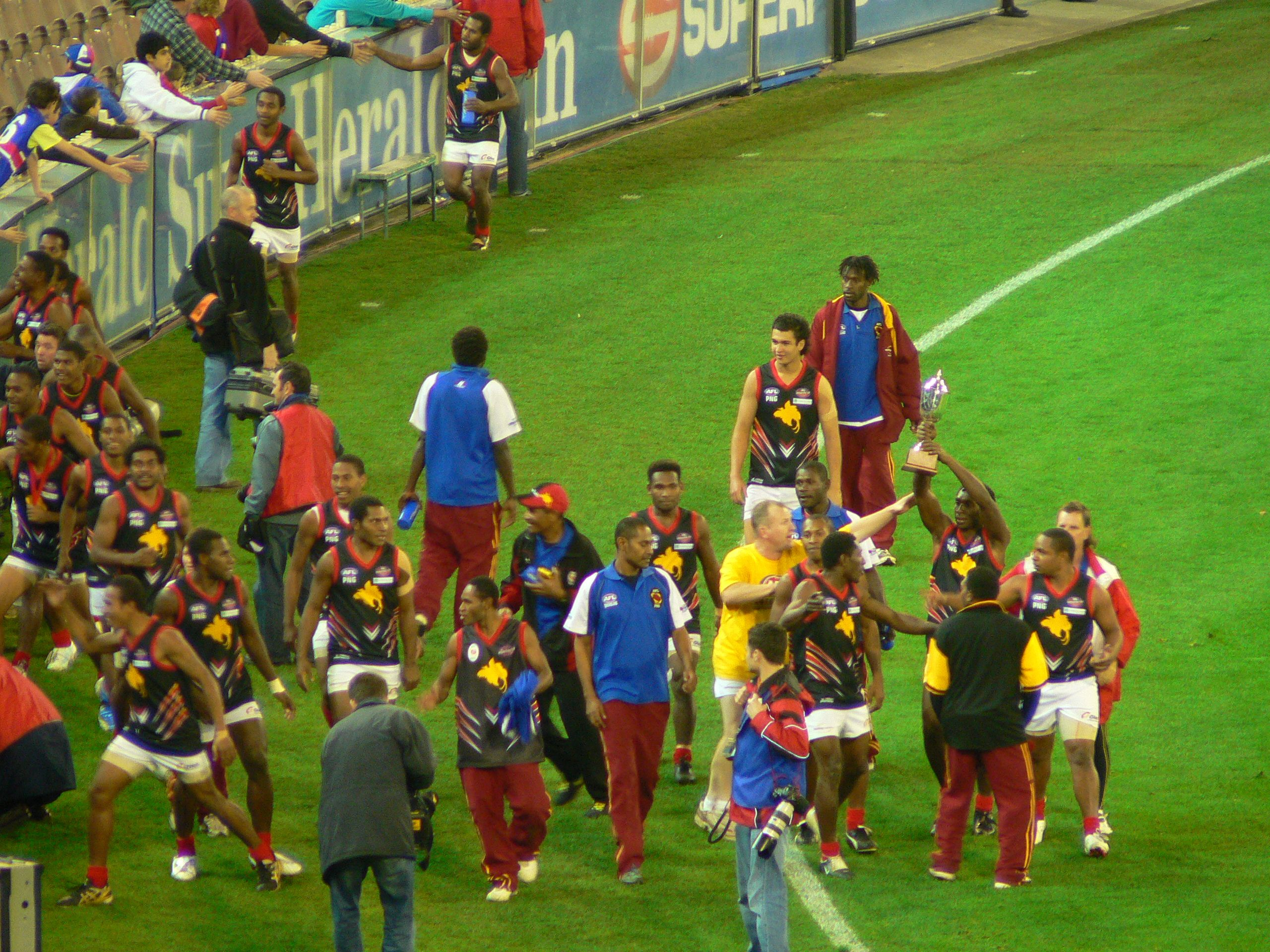
PNG celebrate their first International Cup premiership in 2008

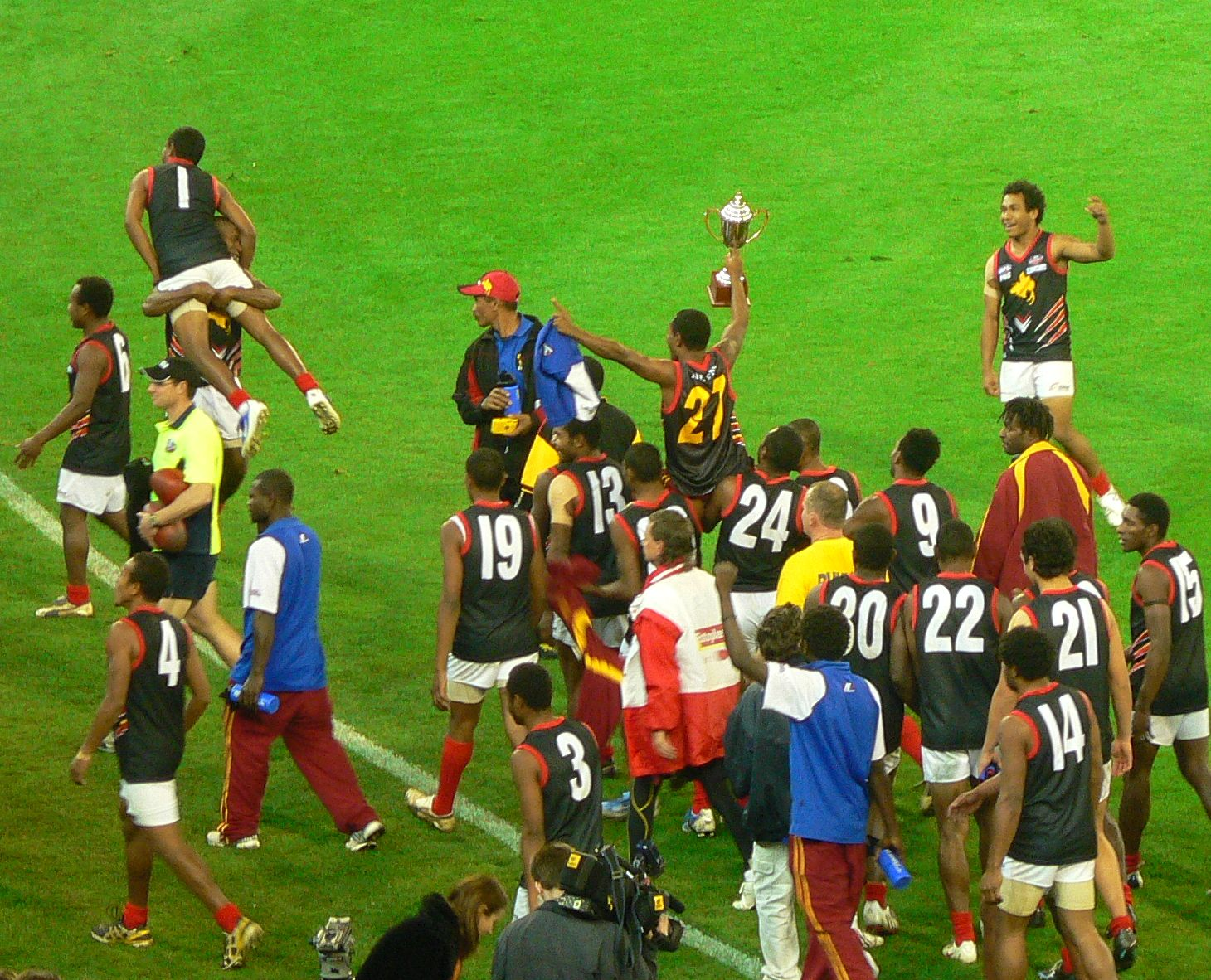
PNG shows the 2008 International Cup to the crowd at the MCG

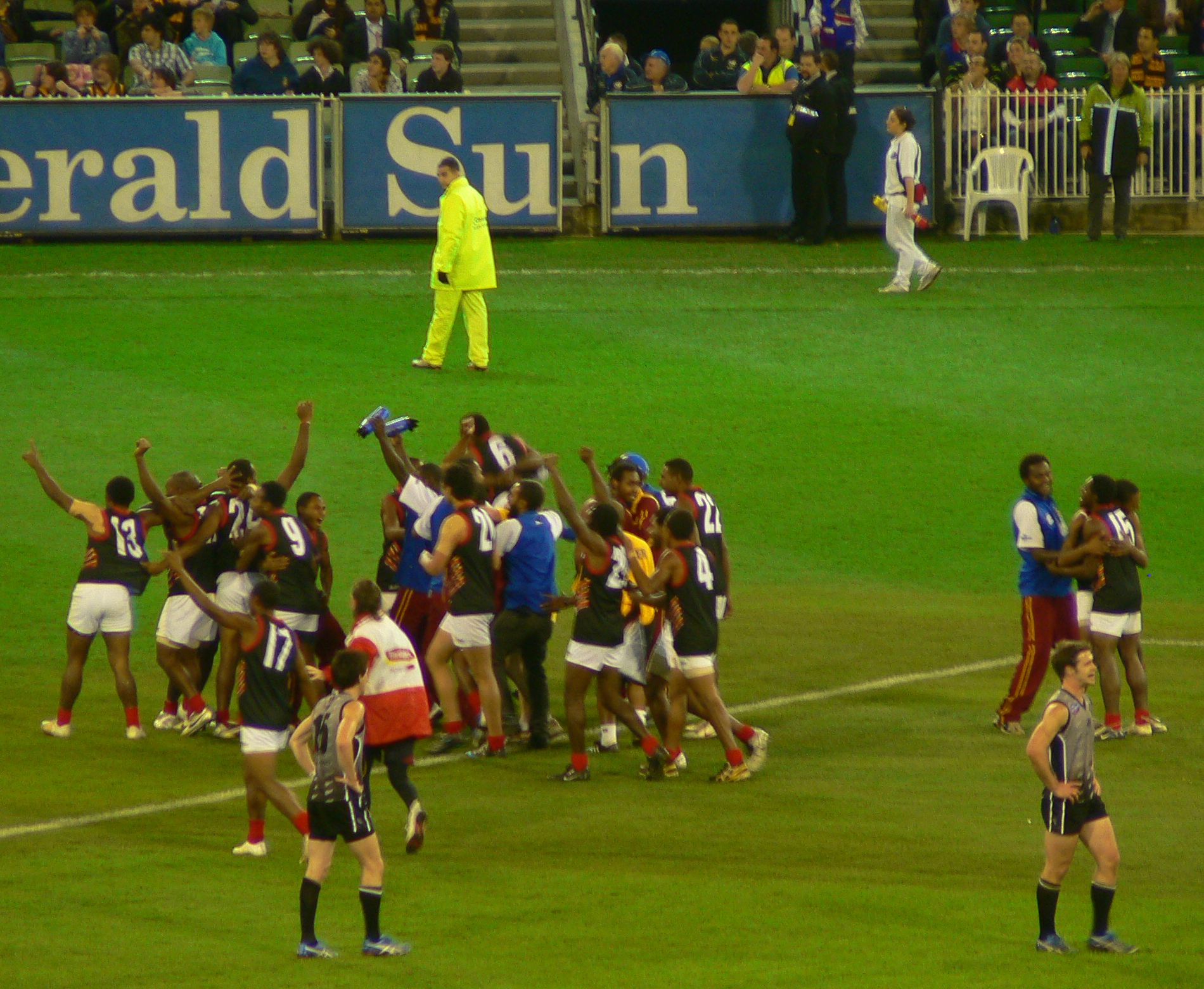
PNG celebrate their 2008 International Cup win

=== Arafura Games ===
- 1995: 1st
- 1997: 1st
- 1999: 1st
- 2001: Did not compete

== Squad and Test history ==
=== 1969 squad ===
This squad was formed to compete against the VFL's visiting St Kilda Football Club which had finished 7/12 (outside finals) in the VFL.

Strong; Leitch; Bae; Pak; Mackinlay; Wiimot; Amini; Roge Iga; Sinari; Wastell; James; Vele; Peni; Ravu Ope; Pickering; Wapa; Bennett; Waea; Dobson; Bernard Mou; Radcliffe

Matches
Year	Date	Opponent	Result	Stadium	Captain (vice-captain)	Coach	Best	Crowd
1969	8 October	St Kilda Football Club	Papua New Guinea 1-6 (12) def. by St Kilda Football Club 9-17 (71)	Sir Hubert Murray Stadium, Port Moresby	Max Bennett, (Vele Peni)	Leo Leary, Max Bennett		5,000

=== 1973/4 squad ===
This squad defeated Indigenous Australia twice, once at Ainslie Oval in Canberra. The side was captained by cross-code footballer Joe Buboi who was also captain of the rugby league Kumuls.

Joe Buboi; Karo Vala; Vali Leka; Joe Pagleo; Bernard Mou; Michael Bai; Phillip George; Agarobe Tau; Boga Tali

Matches
Year	Date	Opponent	Result	Stadium	Captain (vice-captain)	Coach	Best	Crowd
1973	7 October	Aboriginal Australia	Papua New Guinea 17.19 (121) def Aboriginal Australia 12.18 (90)	Sir Hubert Murray Stadium, Port Moresby		Herea Amini, Jack Moffatt	Philip George	6,000
1974	6 October	Aboriginal Australia	Aboriginal Australia 12.12 (84) def. by Papua New Guinea 11.13 (89)	Ainslie Oval, Canberra				

=== 1975 (First National) squad ===
Squad formed to tour Tasmania for an annual match against Aboriginal Australia but was cancelled due to no funding from Australia.

Veari Maha; S. Mairi; A. Leka; R. Ila; G. Guma; I. Ila; B. Leka; R. Leka (Koboni); B. Tali (Aviat); R. Iga; H. Tokapage; M. Tulungum (Port Moresby); E. Ragi (University); G. Nongkas (Elcom); M. Bai; R. Maisu (Defence Force); P. Waea; A. Tau; B. Kaiae; R. Aup; K. Vala (Lae); L. Au; H. Ofora (Bougainville); P. Amini (Madang); P. Aumi (Rabaul)

=== 1976 squad ===
This side was formed for the first true international against Nauru and to take the strongest club from Australia - 1975 VFL premiers and 1976 VFL Grand Finalist North Melbourne.

Veari Maha; Ian MacKinlay; Steven Kakot; Tiana Ila; Martin Tullungun; Gimana Gurna; Ereman Ragi; Vili Maha; Henry Aisapo; Phillip George; Raymond Maisu; Mea Vui; Michael Bai; Gerea Aopi; Mau Au; Pat Amini (Port Moresby); Peiwa Waea; Karo Vala; Barnabas Kaiei; Chris Bais (Lae); Peter Amini (Rabaul)

Matches
Year	Date	Opponent	Result	Stadium	Captain (vice-captain)	Coach	Best	Crowd
1976	20 September	Nauru	Papua New Guinea def Nauru (final margin 129 points)	Sir Hubert Murray Stadium, Port Moresby			Pat Amini	10,000
1976	9 October	North Melbourne Football Club	Papua New Guinea 11-10 (76) def. by North Melbourne 18-12 (120)	Sir Hubert Murray Stadium, Port Moresby			Ereman Ragi	8,000

=== 1977 squad ===
P. Aumi; W. Gare; D. Haro; P. Pati; W. Maha (Port Moresby); R. Aup; P.Waea; C. Bais; Eomelus, K. Vala; C. Daun, (Lae), Y. Maha; B. Haile; G. Laka; A. Colombus; (Goroka); S. Lowa; B. Malagau; S. Akis; M. Tullungan (Rabaul); G. Vegogo; (Madang); B. Matuy; (Wewak);

Matches
Year	Date	Opponent	Result	Stadium	Captain (vice-captain)	Coach	Best	Crowd
1977	9 October	Gold Coast	Papua New Guinea 13-17 (95) def Gold Coast 9-8 (62)	Sir Hubert Murray Stadium, Port Moresby	Vili Maha			

=== 1980 squad ===
Anis Tobata; Steven Kotak; Vali Mavara (Rabaul); Rex Kaupa; Andrew Columbus (Goroka); Peiwa Waea; Kassy Akiro (Lae); Joel Matage; James Logha; Andrew Posai; Gerard Lamis; Vali Leka; William Maha; Daniel Kosikien; Nathan Kaumu; Mau Auk; John Wesley; Paul Sipori; Clement Nakmai; Kila Vuivagi; Peter Aumi (National Capital); Robert Kua; Ando Kwalom; Malcolm Bai

Matches
Year	Date	Opponent	Result	Stadium	Captain (vice-captain)	Coach	Best	Crowd
1980	29 June	Gold Coast	Papua New Guinea 13-8 (86) def. by Gold Coast 18-17 (125)	Gold Coast				

=== 2002 (International Cup) squad ===
1. Walter Yangomina; 2. John Ropa; 3. Peter Meli; 4. Vagi Lai; 5. John Bosko; 6. Jackson Gavuri; 7. Stephen Keu; 9. Andrew Boko; 10. Abraham Henao; 11. Rex Leka; 13. Matthew Mondo; 14. Navu Maha; 15. David Gavara; 16. Bruce Sovara; 17. Pele Kila; 18. Nathan Lowa; 19. Douglas Lai; 21. Bruce Tandawai; 22. Overa Gibson; 25. Hendry Pare; 26. Matthew Bae; 28. Patrick Vuluka; 29. Richard Aupae; 30. Joachim Loggha

=== 2005 (International Cup) squad ===
Coach: Trevor Ila Anaga Isaac (Morobe Province); Desmond Kaumu (West New Britain); Sylvester Magaea (West New Britain); Dominic Livuana (Daru, Western Province); Glen Tom (West New Britain); Joseph Ila (Kimbe); Rex Leka (C) (West New Britain); Robert Lamboku (Kimbe); Brendon Lulubo ( Hoskins); Walter Yangomina (Enga); David Evertius (Milne Bay Province); Morris Aka (West New Britain); Rickard Peni (East New Britain); Chris Lagisa (Talasea); Matthew Mondo (Talasea); Mesea Dorogori (East New Britain); Peter Meli (VC) (Central); Matthew Bae (Central); Overa Gibson (Gulf); Alister Sioni (West New Britain); Michael Ben (Kimbe); Francis Navus (Talasea); Emmanuel Bai (West New Britain); Mark Gori (Kimbe); David Gavara Nanu (New Ireland); Junior Henry (Central); Navu Maha (Central); Kila Pepe (Central); Steven Keu (Kimbe); Stanley Tapend (Enga); Paul Philip (Chimbu); Aria Junior (Gulf); Connie Papau (New Ireland); Raga Raga (Central); Milaura Peter (Gulf)

=== 2008 (International Cup) squad (premiers) ===
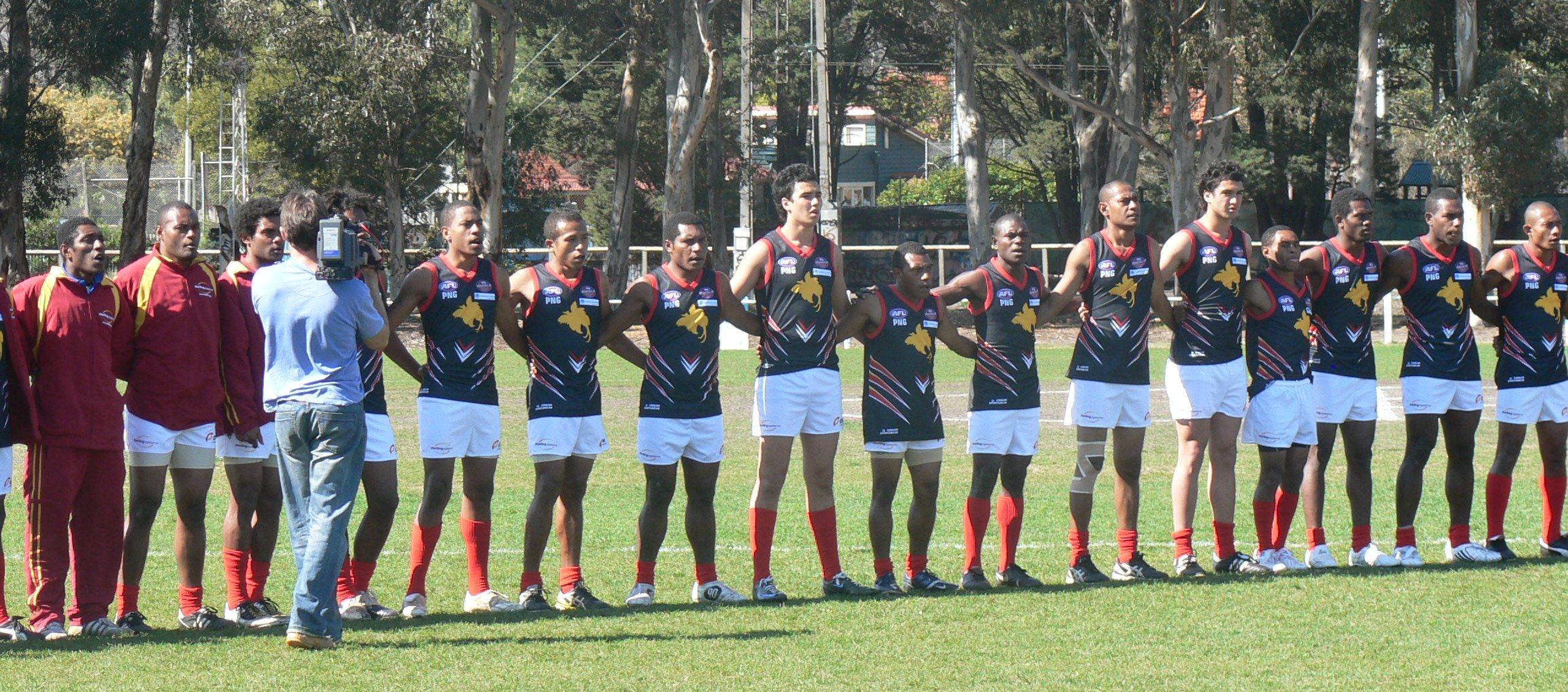
IC08 squad lining up for the national anthem at a first round match in Melbourne

Rex Leka (Central) (captain); Joe Ila (Central); John James (Gulf); Willy Aisi (Central); Desmond Nalong (Morobe); Augustine Bede (West New Britain); Elija Barowai (Western Highlands); Sylvester Mangoea (West New Britain); Boas Keu (West New Britain); Alois Baleko (West New Britain); David Evertius (Central); Emmaus Wartovo (East New Britain); Zachary Rava (West New Britain); Peter Milaure (Gulf); Desmond Waluka (West New Britain); Jimmy Logha (West New Britain); Stanis Susuve (Gulf); Amua Pirika (Morobe); Alan Kaumu (West New Britain); Mesa Dorogori (Western Province); Johnny Bosko (West New Britain); Overa Gibson (Gulf); Donald Barry (Gulf); Alestar Sioni (West New Britain); Henry Henry (East New Britain); John Vincent (Gulf); Bruce Savara (West New Britain); Raga Raga(Central); Niki Appamumu (West New Britain); Ali Pinda (Chimbu); Emergencies: Peter Labi (Eastern Islands); Emmanual Tupia (West New Britain); Johnny Vogoe (West New Britain); David Meli (West New Britain)

=== 2011 (International Cup) squad ===
Theo Gavuri (West New Britain); Gideon Simon (Western Highlands); David Meli (Central); Wingti Pena (Western Highlands); Joe Ila (Central); Jim Logha (West New Britain); Brendon Beno (Bougainville); Fredrick Peni (East New Britain); John James (Gulf); Paul Philip (Chimbu); Larry Nao (Gulf); Lawrie Logo (East New Britain); Alestair Sione (Morobe); Peter Milaura (Gulf); Richard Stegman (Western Highlands); Greg Aki (Western Highlands); Henry Henry (East New Britain); John Vogae (West New Britain; Collins Slim (Gulf); Emmaus Wartovo (East New Britain; Peter Labi (Morobe); Major Alphonse (West New Britain); Stanis Susuve (Gulf); Ali Pinda (Chimbu); Amua Pirika (Central); Emmanuel Tupia (West New Britain); Jeffrey Nemete (West New Britain); Bruce Sovare (West New Britain); Nicholas Apamumu (Kimbe); John Ikupu (Chimbu); Tiernan Carbry (Central); Willy Aisi (Central); Gagu Kayage (Western Province); Alois Melua (West new Britain);

=== 2014 (International Cup) squad (premiers) ===
Peter Labi (North Cairns); Ryan Agita (Broadbeach); Stanis Susuve (Coolangatta); Amua Pirika (Campbelltown); Emmaus Wartovo (Port Moresby Dockers); Gideon Simon (Richmond); John James (Aspley); Jason So'ong (Coolamon); Jeconiah Peni (Campbelltown); Emmanuel Tupia (Port Moresby Dockers); Greg Aki (Coolamon); John Ikupu (West Coburg); Peter Milaura (Gulf Giants); Stanis Agita (Broadbeach); Donald Barry (Coolangatta); Paul Phillip (Gordons Kokofas); Theo Gavuri (Sydney Hills Eagles); Jeffrey Namete (Taurama Suns); Sylvester Mangaea (Port Moresby Dockers); Brendan Beno (Coolangatta); Willie Asi (North Cairns); Michael Macca (Carnington/Linton); Scott Johnson (Carnington/Linton); Chris Mong (Taurama Suns); Wingti Pena (University Tigers); David Topeni (University Tigers); Alphonse Jambafuro (Campbelltown); Laurie Logo (University Tigers); Clydie Pulah (University Tigers); Elliot Takolu (Lae); Freddie Kalandi (Mt Hagen); Tony Meli (Lae); Freeman Keno (Lae); Greg Ekari (Bomana Cats); Kataha Siwee (Bomana Cats); Luke Savere (Bomana Cats); Brendan Gotuno (University Tigers); Ezra Gotuno (Gerehu Magpies); Ori Nilmo (Port Moresby Dockers); David Stegman (Mt. Hagen) Richard Stegman (Mt. Hagen); Sunny Yogomin (Gordons Kokofas); Sam Ila (Gordons Kokofas); David Meli (Port Moresby Dockers)

=== 2017 (International Cup) squad (premiers) ===
John James Lavai (Koboni) (captain); Hewago Paul Oea (Gordon Kokofas); Hapeo Bobogi (Gordon Kokofas); Kelly Kaugla (Bomana Cats); Benedict Tirang (West Eagles); Scott Johnson (Salle Dogs); Tyler Goroga (Pt Hedland Tigers); Luke Savere (Defence Hawks); Jeconiah Peni (Montrose); Amua Pirika (Central Bombers); Ryan Agita (Hermit Park Tigers); Emmaus Wartovo (Sandgate Hawks); Matthew King (Montrose); Jason So-ong (Mt Hagen); Brendan Beno (Koboni); Gideon Simon (Trinity Bulldogs); Max Lavai (Koboni); Stannis Agita (Hermit Park Tigers); Jeffrey Namete (Taurama Suns); David Topeni (Koboni); Gregory Ekari (West Eagles); Laurie Logo (Lamana Dockers); Kataha Paulias Siwee (Bomana Cats); Paul Phillip (Koboni); Willie Aisi (Manunda Hawks); John Ikupu (Euroa Magpies ); Douglas Gabriel Tuai Lai (Koboni); Alphonse Jambarufo (Koboni); Emmanuel Tupia (Lamana Dockers); Greg Paul Aki (Koboni)

== Junior Men's Team ==
The "Binatangs" are the underage men's team. There are Under 14, U16 and U18 squads. The Binatangs compete in the Oceania Cup as well as the Queensland Country Australian Football Championships and more recently, the Queensland State Australian Football Championships.

The first national junior men's squads were formed in the 1970s and they debuted at international level.

=== 1977 U17 vs Victoria ===
In 1977 the Under 17 squad competed against a touring Victorian Under 17 team (the reigning Australian Champions) at Hubert Murray Stadium in front of a crowd of 4,000 spectators.

Squad: Ragii Amini, Roga Raga, William Mahaj, Bui Dulau, Nanai (Port Moresby); Thomas Ravuman, Peter Pati (Aviat); Bruno Galoka, Paul Bagea, Anthony Narang, Steven Topo (Rabaul); Amona Akaru, Michael Keu, Emanuel Penias (Lae); Paga Ropa, Rex Bulua, Malo Mokare, Billy Voro, Asigau Tau Douna (Lae); Nicholas Lupa (Wewak); Stalis Kilo (Kimbe)

Matches
Year	Date	Opponent	Result	Stadium	Captain (vice-captain)	Coach	Best	Crowd
1977	23 August	Victoria U17	Papua New Guinea 5.11 (41) def by (Victoria (state)) Victoria 10.16 (76)	Sir Hubert Murray Stadium				4,000

=== 1978 U17 Australian tour ===
In June 1978 Papua New Guinea made a reciprocal tour and came within two goals of Australia at Football Park in Adelaide.

Squad: L Matapere, W Maha, M Au, W Kirorok, G Aruai, E Walo, A Iga, M D Mudian, B Nou, W Peny, L Banawa, R Ravu. T Ha, R Auka, F Ben (Port Moresby); J Lifu (Wewak); Moskik (Madang); P Potalsa, P Naes (Rabaul); A Koriaka, K Gelai (Goroka): P Hatagen, G Maris, D Isori, R Karo (Lae)

J. Matage (capt); K. Akiro; P. Aumi; A. Ben; D. Haro; J. Kali; M. Tulungan (Moresby); C. Bais; R. Karo; V. Maha; I. Mari; R. Roga; K. Vala (Lae); P. Pati (v-capt); J. Dau; M. Henry; L. Woiwoi (Rabaul); A. Columbus; M. Dono; M. Haro; P. Karo (Goroka); R. Bob; P. Shapen; T. Waluka (Hagen); A. Sodas (Madang)

Matches
Year	Date	Opponent	Result	Stadium	Captain (vice-captain)	Coach	Best	Crowd
1978	8 June	Australia U17	Australia 12.13 (85) def Papua New Guinea 10.14 (74)	Football Park, Adelaide				

=== 1979 (Teal Cup U17) tournament ===
In 1979, the Under 17 squad travelled to Tasmania to compete in the Australian national underage Teal Cup competition for the first time.

Squad: Alamo Alearu (Boroko); George Ambo (Saints United); Repa Au (Kwikila); Isidore Buetwel (Mongop); Berto Dedei (Kimbe) Katinga Demas (Utu); Robert Edward (Normil); Gamoga Gini (Rigo-ANG); Kana Ila (Koboni); Olo Ila (Koboni Kangas); Roy Kenba (Branch); Heni Kila (Mokele); Pius Kopang (Vunakanau); Kamas Kuian (Sogeri); Mathew Lekani (Hoskins); Tommy Manu (Goroka); Francis Mondo (Vunakanau); Leloi Odana (Tusbab); Vele Rupa (Tusbab); Harison Sale (Namatanai); Ila Tiana (Koboni); Graham Tovili (West United); Tuli Tuli (Boroko); Gerea Vagi (Mokele)

Matches
Year	Date	Opponent	Result	Stadium	Captain (vice-captain)	Coach	Best	Crowd
1979	16 June	Australian Capital Territory	Australian Capital Territory 26-12 (168) def Papua New Guinea 3-6 (24)					
1979	18 June	New South Wales	New South Wales 19-16 (130) def Papua New Guinea 8-8 (56)					
1979	17 June	South Australia	South Australia 42-40 (292) def Papua New Guinea 1-5 (11)					

=== 2009 Flying Boomerangs Tour ===
Matches
Year	Date	Opponent	Result	Stadium	Captain (vice-captain)	Coach	Best	Crowd
2009		Flying Boomerangs	Papua New Guinea (U18) 9.12 (66) def Flying Boomerangs 9.11 (65)	University of PNG Oval, Papua New Guinea			Kayne, Nicholas, Pena, Norman, Carbry	2,500
2009		Flying Boomerangs	Papua New Guinea B (U18) 2.2 (14) def by Flying Boomerangs 7.10 (52)	Lae, Papua New Guinea				8,000

== Women's Teams ==
The women's national teams were formed in 2006 to compete in the AFL Women's National Championship. In 2011 squads were selected from the national championships to represent Papua New Guinea in the very first International Cup women's division for IC11. Three squads were formed, the senior Flame squad, an Under 16 Karakums squad and an Under 19 Kapundas squad. The Flame made their international debut winning the very first International Cup women's match, defeating the Australian Multicultural and Indigenous side 9.3 (57) to 1.1 (7).

=== PNG Flame (Open level) ===
The Flame is the Open level senior women's squad. It was formed in 2006 to compete in the AFL Women's National Championship. It participated in the very first International Cup women's division for IC11. It did not send a squad in 2014 but has participated regularly since IC17.

Since 2012, the Flame have participated in the AFL Queensland Women's State Championships initially competing against Cairns and South East Queensland.

=== Karakums (U16/U19) ===
The Karakums is the name of the Underage (Youth Girls) squad and participates at Under 16 and Under 19 level. At under 19 level they were previously the Kapundas. Under 16 and Under 19 squads were formed at the 2011 PNG National Championships to support the development of the senior women's team.

The Karakums have participated in the Oceania Cup and the AFL Queensland Women's State Championships since 2016. Their first win was over AFL Northern Rivers in 2018.

In 2023 the Karakums Under 19s participated in a series of test matches in Brisbane and the Gold Coast against Nauru's national teams and local sides. A PNG shot at goal after the siren fell short resulting in Nauru holding on 3.9(27) to PNG's 3.4(22).

== See also ==
- Australian rules football in Papua New Guinea
- AFL PNG
