= Atlantic Alliance Cup =

Football tournament

The Atlantic Alliance Cup is an international Australian rules football tournament run every 3 years. The inaugural tournament pitted clubs and national teams from the North Atlantic together.

== History ==
Like the Australian Football International Cup, the event does not allow ex-patriate Australians to play, and all players must be born in and have played for their respective countries.

The only cup was held in London between 6–15 October 2001 and included national teams from the United States, Canada, Great Britain and Denmark. Ireland's national team won the event in convincing fashion, defeating Denmark in the Grand Final.

The 2004 tournament was cancelled due to lack of funds from Denmark, Ireland and Great Britain, and it was from this that the 49th Parallel Cup was started between the US and Canada.

The 2007 tournament was never seriously contemplated and the series appears to be in limbo.
