= Sport in Tonga =

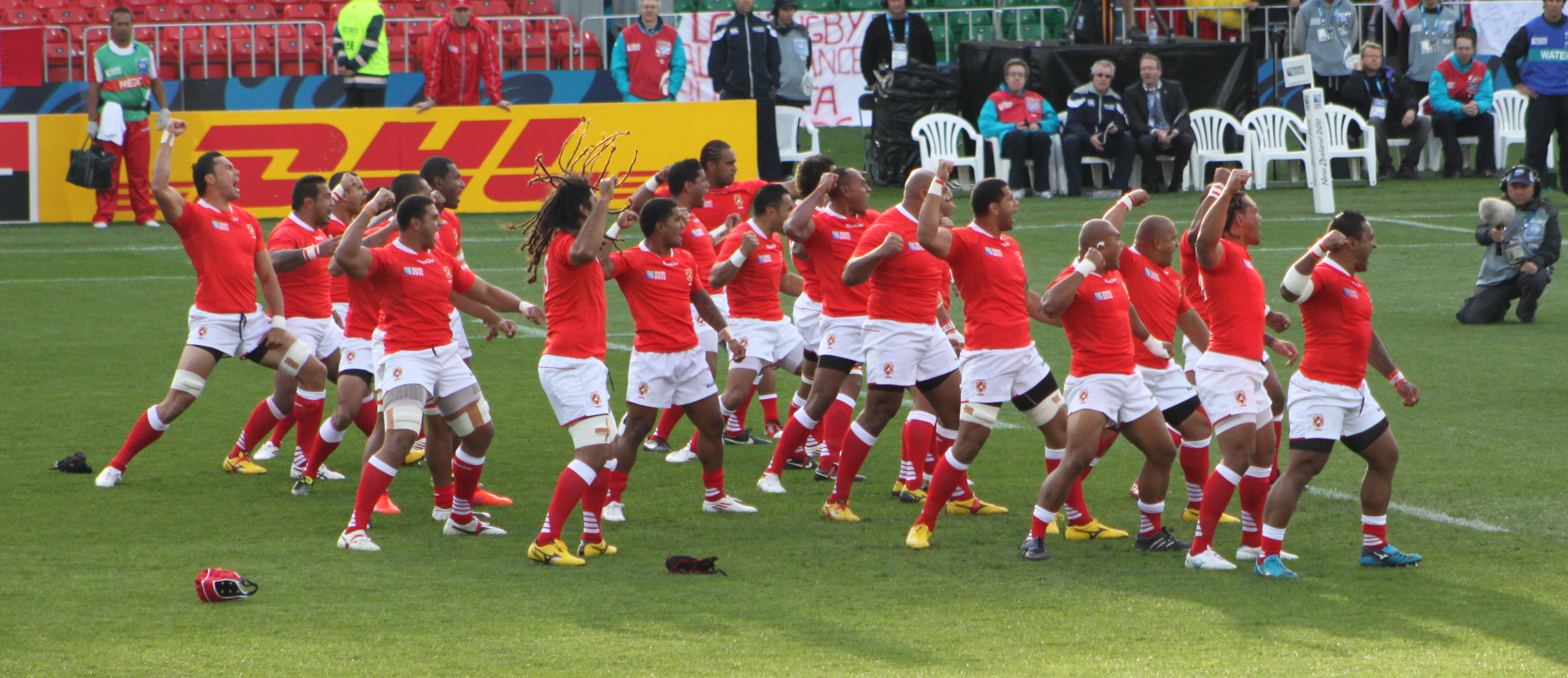
Tonga performing the sipi tau before their match vs. France at the 2011 Rugby World Cup.

Sport in Tonga consists of many games. Rugby union is the national sport, sumo has a following, while football, professional wrestling, judo, surfing, volleyball, and cricket have gained popularity in recent years. Rugby league and Australian football are also played.

== Rugby union ==
Rugby union is the national sport, and the national team (ʻIkale Tahi, or Sea Eagles) has performed on the international stage. Though Tongans are passionate rugby followers and players, their small population base means that, much like its Pacific Island neighbours, Samoa and Fiji, Tonga has a limited yet talented player pool, and sometimes struggles with the resources and numbers of larger nations. Young talent often emigrates or is poached to countries which offer greater prospects of individual success such as New Zealand, Australia and Europe. Nevertheless, all three countries perform far beyond their population base size.

Tonga has competed in six Rugby World Cups since 1987. The 2007 and 2011 Rugby World Cups were Tonga's most successful to date: Tonga won two out of four matches in each and was in a running chance for the quarter-finals. In the 2007 Rugby World Cup, Tonga won its first two matches, against the USA 25–15, and Samoa 19–15; and came very close to upsetting the eventual winners of the 2007 tournament, the South African Springboks, losing 30–25. A loss to England, 36–20 in their last pool game ended their hopes of making the knockout stages. Nevertheless, by picking up third place in their pool games behind South Africa and England, Tonga earned automatic qualification for the 2011 Rugby World Cup in New Zealand.

In Pool A of the 2011 Rugby World Cup, Tonga beat both Japan 31–18, and the 5th ranked eventual finalist France 19–14 in the latter pool stages. However, a previous heavy defeat to the All Blacks at the tournament's opener (41–10) and a subsequent tight loss to Canada (25–20) meant that Tonga lost out to France (who also lost to the New Zealand All Blacks) for the quarter-finals due to 2 bonus points and a points difference of 46. Tonga's best results prior to 2007 came in 1995, when they beat Ivory Coast 29–11, and 1999 when they beat Italy 28–25 (although with only 14 men they lost heavily to England, 101–10). Tonga emerged victoryless in the 1987 and 2003 Rugby World Cups, and did not qualify for the 1991 Rugby World Cup.

Tonga perform the Ikale Tahi war dance or Sipi Tau (a form of Kailao) before all their matches. Tonga used to compete in the Pacific Tri-Nations against Samoa and Fiji, which has now been replaced by the IRB Pacific Nations Cup, which now also involves Japan, Canada, and the United States. At club level, there are the Datec Cup Provincial Championship and the Pacific Rugby Cup. Rugby union is governed by the Tonga Rugby Football Union, which was also a member of the Pacific Islands Rugby Alliance, and contributed to the Pacific Islanders rugby union team, before both were disbanded in 2009.

Many players of Tongan descent, e.g., Jonah Lomu, Israel Folau, Viliami "William" ʻOfahengaue, Malakai Fekitoa, Ben Afeaki, Charles Piutau, Frank Halai, Sekope Kepu, George Smith, Wycliff Palu, Sitaleki Timani, Salesi Ma'afu, Anthony and Saia Fainga'a, Mark Gerrard, Cooper Vuna, Doug Howlett, Toutai Kefu and Tatafu Polota-Nau have played for either the All Blacks or the Wallabies. British and Irish Lion and Welsh international player Taulupe "Toby" Faletau is Tongan born and the son of Tongan international Kuli Faletau. Taulupe's cousins and England international players Billy and Mako Vunipola (who is also a British and Irish Lion), are sons of former Tonga rugby captain Fe'ao Vunipola. Rugby is popular among the nation's schools, and students from schools such as Tonga College and Tupou College are regularly offered scholarships in New Zealand, Australia and Japan.

== Rugby league ==
Rugby league is a popular team sport played in Tonga. There are 10 First Division sides in the Global Insurance Cup, and there are nine in the Second Division. Only Kolomu'a Warriors (One of two Nuku'alofa Clubs) and the Vaini Doves have First and Second Division sides. The First Division sides have been, to a greater extent, regular participants in the competition since the inception of league in 1988. Those sides are Kolomu'a, Vaini, Mu'a Saints, Silapeluua (Ha'ateiho) Crusaders, Lapaha Knights, Ha'akame Broncos, Hihifo Rovers, Havelu Bulldogs, Halaloto Barbarians and Nakolo Raiders. The Second Division consists of a number of clubs that have participated infrequently over a number of years. However, regulars in the Second Division are Fatumu, Ha'ateiho Spartans and Ngalukilo Stormers.

Secondary Schools Competition started in 2007 with five teams in the Under 18s competition and eight teams in the Under 16s. Takuilau High School won the Under 18s competition and Liahona High School won the Under 16s competition.

It is the largest number of teams and players participating in rugby league in Tongan history, with the National Schools Committee starting the Under 12s, Under 14s and Under 15s in 2008.

TNRL estimates that there are roughly 1,500 players playing rugby league in Tonga for 2007.

Tonga are represented internationally by the Tonga national rugby league team, who have competed in three Rugby League World Cups, and also compete in regular Pacific Cup competitions. In the 2013 Rugby League World Cup Tonga Lost to Scotland before beating Cook Islands and Italy. However this was not enough for them to reach the quarter-finals. Tonga is currently ranked 4th in the world.

== American football ==
The first Tongan to play in the NFL was running back/kick returner Vai Sikahema (1986-1993). Offensive lineman Spencer Folau, born in Nuku'alofa, was a member of the Super Bowl XXXV champion Baltimore Ravens. Tongan Americans currently playing in the NFL include Pro Bowler Haloti Ngata of the Philadelphia Eagles, and Star Lotulelei of the Buffalo Bills. New York Jets nose tackle Sione Pouha, Minnesota Vikings fullback Naufahu Tahi, Kansas City Chiefs tight end Tony Moeaki; offensive guard Deuce Lutui, who was born in the Haʻapai division of the islands, played for the Cincinnati Bengals. Former Carolina Panthers defensive tackle Ma'ake Kemoeatu and his brother, offensive lineman Chris Kemoeatu, who has won the Super Bowl two times, with the Pittsburgh Steelers, are also natives of Tonga. Halapoulivaati Vaitai, drafted by the Philadelphia Eagles in the 5th round of the 2015 NFL draft, Vaitai replaced the injured Pro-bowler Jason Peters in the starting lineup for the remainder of the 2017 season and went on to win the Super Bowl that season. The most recent NFL player who was born in Tonga is Giovanni Manu, who appeared in the 2025 NFL season with the Detroit Lions.

== Australian rules football ==
Australian rules football was first played in 2003, when the Tonga Australian Football Association was founded. A school competition has been played yearly since then, including a tour to Samoa. A Tongan team competed at the 2004 Australian Football Multicultural Cup.

The senior men's representative team is known as the Black Marlins, and hosted Australian amateur team the Fitzroy Reds in late 2006.

Although the Black Marlins could not raise the money required to send a team to the 2008 Australian Football International Cup, a Tongan-Australian side did participate in the multicultural division of the competition against multicultural sides from Asia and Africa.

== Boxing ==
Boxing is a growing sport in Tonga. Boxer Paea Wolfgramm won the silver medal in the Super Heavyweight division (> 91 kg) at the 1996 Summer Olympics. Although he is not the first Pacific Islander to win a medal at an Olympics, he is the first to do so representing a Pacific Island nation. This makes Tonga the first Pacific island nation to win a medal at the Olympic Games, and the only one until the Fiji men's team won gold in rugby sevens at the 2012 Summer Olympics.

== Cricket ==
The Tonga cricket team is the team that represents the country of Tonga in international cricket matches. They became an affiliate member of the International Cricket Council in 2000. In 2008, they sent a representative to the ICC East Asia Development Program in Melbourne. The representative was Sione Hamala.They were removed as an affiliate member in June 2014, for failing to comply with membership requirements.

== Luge ==
Princess Pilolevu Tuita is known as the patron of the Luge Federation of the Kingdom of Tonga. She sponsored Bruno Banani, real name Fuahea Semi, who failed in the Qualification to the 2010 Winter Olympics, but was 41st at 2009–10 Luge World Cup in Calgary. There was controversy about the true name and history of Banani. who claimed to be the son of coconut farmers in Tonga. The reality was that he was re-named by a German marketing firm in order to promote a brand of German underwear. Also, he was the son of a cassava farmer, not a coconut farmer, but the marketing firm thought that since many people did not know what cassava was, they would claim he was the son of a cocunut farmer. The name of the marketing firm was Makai.

== Olympics ==
Aside from rugby, Tonga has also produced athletes that have competed at both the Summer and Winter Olympics. Most recently, Taekwondo athlete Pita Taufatofua competed at the 2016 Olympic Games, where he did not make it past the first round but gained international recognition from his shirtless entry in the opening ceremonies Parade of Nations. Despite freezing temperatures, he donned the same costume again at the 2018 Olympic Games, where he qualified to compete in cross-county skiing. He came in 114th out of 119th in his event.

== Professional wrestling ==
There a number of Tongans that compete in the sport of professional wrestling. Notable Tongans include Tonga Fifita, who competed as Haku and Meng in the World Wrestling Federation and World Championship Wrestling along with his cousin Simi Fale, also competes under the name Bad Luck Fale in New Japan Pro-Wrestling, although they have connections to the Anoaʻi Samoan wrestling family. Following Fifita's footsteps are his nephew Alipate Leone (Tama Tonga), along with his adoptive brother Tevita Fifita (Tonga Loa) and biological brother Tautuiaki Koloamatangi (Talla Tonga). All of them were part of the Bullet Club stable and later Guerrillas of Destiny, in which Tama Tonga, Tonga Loa and Talla Tonga compete in the WWE under The Bloodline (MFT) stable.

== Stadiums in Tonga ==
Stadium	Capacity	City	Tenants	Image
Teufaiva Sport Stadium	10,000	Nuku'alofa	Tonga national football team Tonga national rugby union team	

== See also ==
- Sport in Oceania
- Lists of stadiums
