= Australian rules football in Japan =

- Country: Japan
- Governing body: AFL Japan
- National team: Japan
- First played: 1910, Tokyo
- Registered players: 575 (total); 575 (adult)
- Clubs: 15

Club competitions
- Tokyo Open League; Tokyo University League; Japan Osaka Australian Football League; Nippon Australian Football League

Audience records
- Single match: 25,000 (1986). Carlton v. Hawthorn (Yokohama Stadium, Kanagawa)

Australian rules football in Japan describes the development of the team sport which dates back to 1910, but found its roots in the late 1980s mainly due to the influence of Australian Football appearing on Japanese television.

Japan competes regularly at international level and Japan's national team, the Samurai, has defeated amateur Australian clubs on numerous occasions. Japan has competed in all AFL International Cups, its highest placing was 8th in 2008 and it is currently seeded in Division 2. Japan also fields an all-university side, the Warriors, in Division 2 of the Asian Australian Football Championships reaching 4th in 2019.

== History of Australian Rules Football in Japan ==
=== First Introduction: 1910 ===
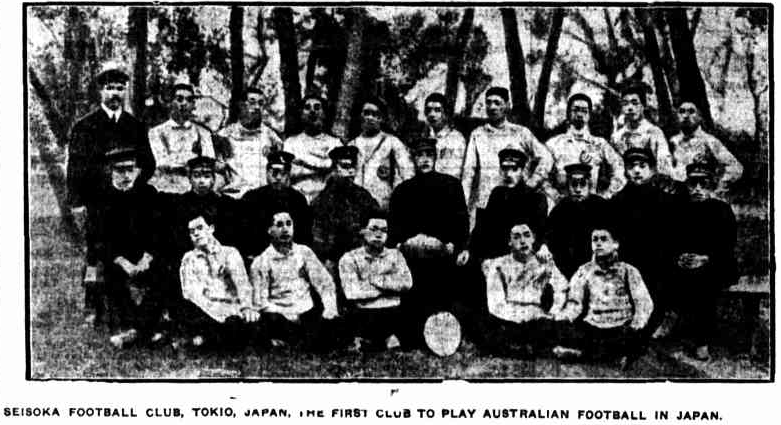
Seisoka Football Club, Tokio 1911

Australian rules football was first introduced to Japan in 1910 by a A. W. McLean from Melbourne while working as an official at the British Embassy of Tokyo. He founded the Seisoka Football Club and was successful in introducing it as a sport to four large high schools in Tokyo by having the rules translated into Japanese.

McLean wrote to authorities in Australia including the Victorian Football League and the Australasian Football Council requesting assistance to establish the sport and a Japanese national side. However it was not forthcoming. A motion was raised by West Australian delegate Jack Simons and debated by the Australian National Football Conference in 1910, though the council did not offer support it allowed the state of Western Australia to offer its support. The closest that such support came was when the Young Australia League in Western Australia which had organised an international tour, initially slated it to include Japan. However the Japan leg was cancelled due to the prohibitive logistics (and a lack of support from the game's governing body) and the tour went only as far as the US and Canada. McLean returned to Australia and Sydney in 1912. It is not known if the game survived after this.

=== Revival and Occupation of Japan ===
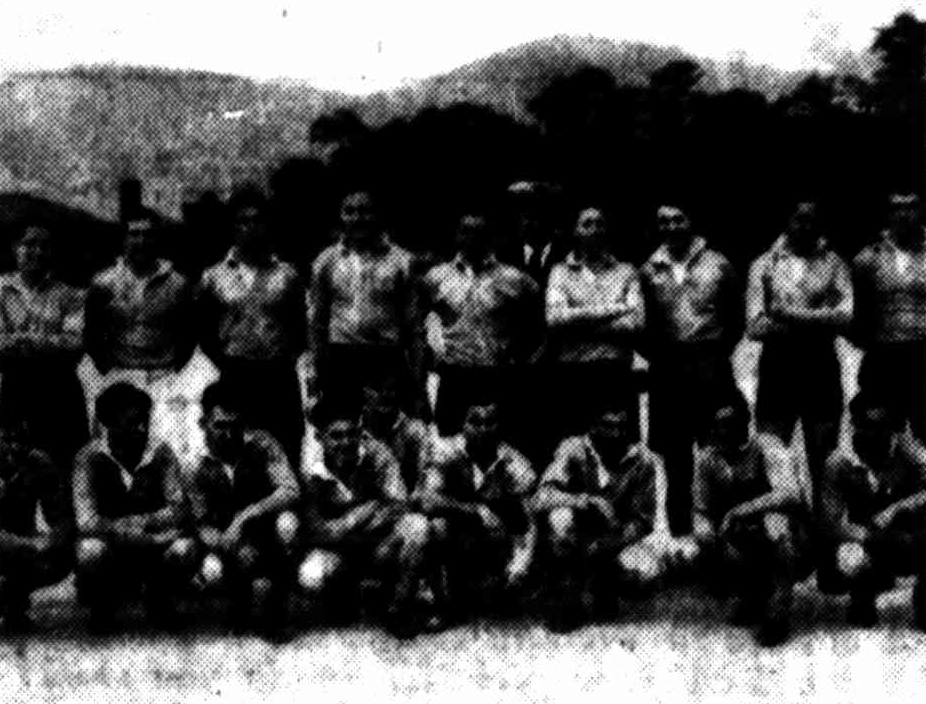
HMAS Hobart Australian rules football team assemble for a match in Kure, Hiroshima in 1946

In 1936 the Australian National Football Council debated supporting an effort by Victorian student T. W. Ekersley to reintroduce the sport to Japan.

In 1945, the crews of HMAS Nepal and HMS Shropshire contested a match at Yokohama watched by a crowd of Japanese and American nationals. Nepal 5.1 defeated Shropshire 1.6.

In 1946 a match was played at Kure, Hiroshima between the British Commonwealth Base team and the 168th General Transport Company at Anzac Oval. Another series of matches was played at Kure in the snow on a gravel ground between teams of the crews of HMAS Hobart, HMAS Arunta and HMAS Warramunga.

In 1947 at Hōfu, the RAAF played a knock-out competition consisting of several teams including 82 RAAF, 76 RAAF, 381 RAAF and 481 RAAF. Squadron 82 defeated Squadron 76 in the final 8.10 to 1.9.

In 1964 Japanese schoolboy Hideki Oka spent 12 months in Australia under Rotary Club sponsorship where he played Australian rules football.

=== 1980s and the Aussie Bowl ===
Interest was rekindled when, in 1986, the VFL sent two teams to Japan in an effort to encourage the international recognition of the sport. Hawthorn and Carlton played an exhibition match in Tokyo in front of a mix of expatriate Australians and locals. The match was broadcast on TBS and TV Asahi.

The following year saw Hawthorn take on Essendon in the second 'Aussie Bowl'. The curtain raiser for this match was played by a makeshift team of Japanese university students. The nation's two most famous private universities scraped together teams of inexperienced Japanese boys to play Japan's first "real" footy match of the 1980s. The two teams, Keio and Waseda, are arch rivals in almost every sport - creating for a classic rivalry along the lines of Carlton v. Collingwood.

=== Growth of Local Competitions and establishment of national team ===
That match was the birth of the Japanese Australian Football Association (JAFA). Those two universities still play a large part, together with another private university, Senshu University. Together they came to form the "Japan Samurais".

The Tokyo Goannas formed in November 1991. Their aims were to publicise and promote Australian football in Japan, arrange games on a regular and more organised basis.

There is a league competition and regular one-off games, including the Qantas Cup (a Goannas intra-club, Victoria vs. The Rest Of The World match) and the Ned Kelly Cup (a "Combined Rules" match against the Irish). As well as playing in Japan, the Goannas have disturbed the peace of Hong Kong and Singapore and JAFA has sent a national team to take part in the Arafura Games in Darwin in 1995, 1997, 1999 and 2001, the Narita Cup and later the Australian Football International Cup in 2002 and 2005.

Expansion in 2006 saw a rival league to the Japan AFL, the Nippon Australian Football League (formerly the Australian Football League Kansai Japan) emerge. The league has since governed both the Australian Football League Tokui Japan and the Australian Football League Kansai Japan covering some of the regions further south of Tokyo including the cities of Kyoto, Kobe and Osaka. Both the JAFL and NAFL expressed the desire to represent Japan in international matches, however the AFL has stated that only one team can represent a country at the International Cup. The Nippon AFL appeared to become dormant in 2008, but not before the mighty Nagoya Redbacks won three premierships in a row all thanks to the bustling centre half forward Bradley Manson who averaged 3–6 goals per match..

Japan entered two sides into the Asian Australian Football Championships in 2019, fielding an all-Japanese University-based team, the Warriors in Division 2.

== Participation ==
In 2004, Japan had four leagues, including a women's league, with more than 500 registered players around the country competing in league competition and other games. Some 83 per cent of the registered players are Japanese nationals.

== Audience ==
=== Attendance Record ===
- 25,000 (1986). Carlton v. Hawthorn (Yokohama Stadium, Kanagawa)

== Governing body ==
The governing body for the sport in Japan is AFL Japan

== National team ==
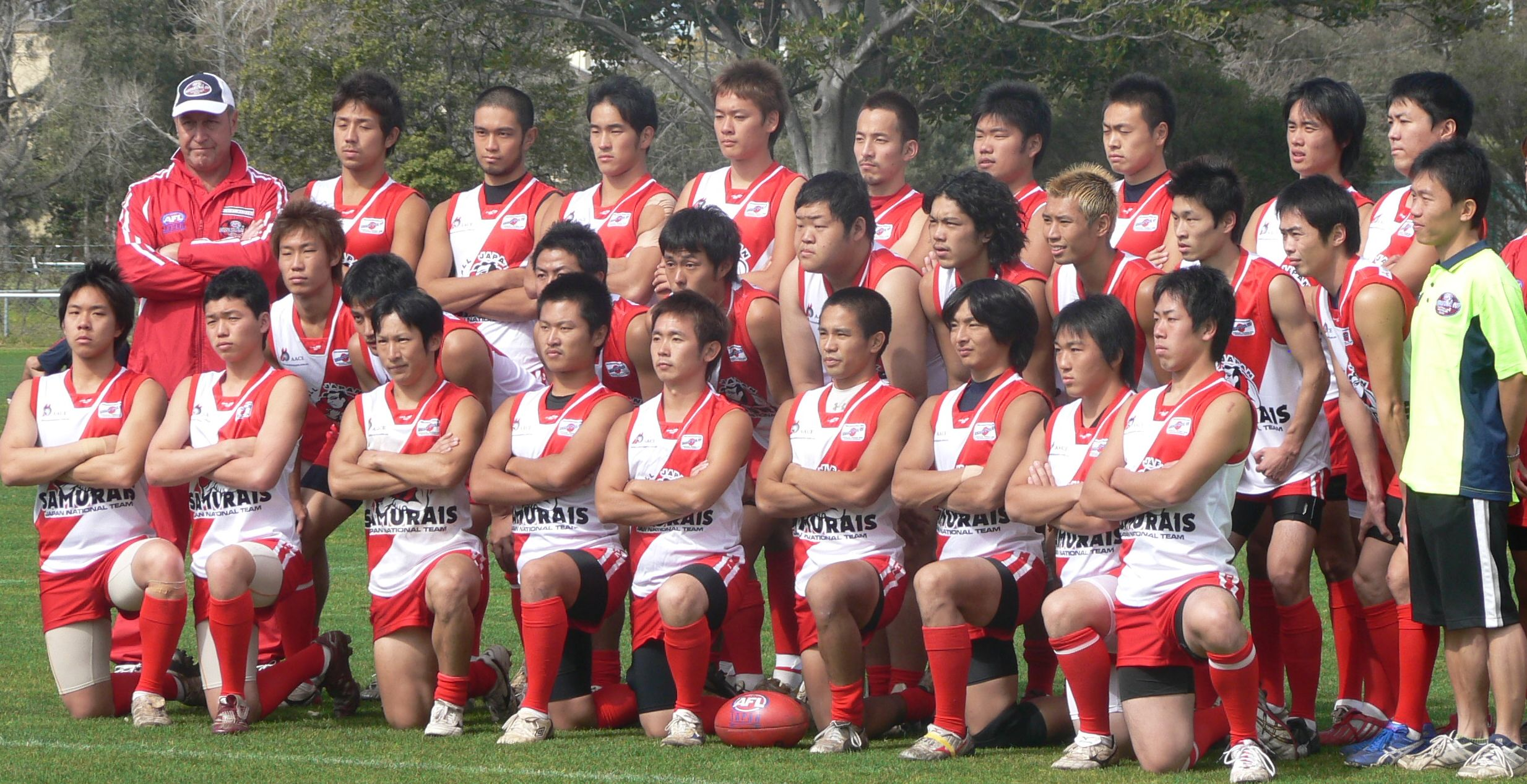
Japan's national team for the 2008 International Cup

The national team is the Samurai

== Leagues & Competitions ==
- Tokyo Open League
- Tokyo University League
- Japan Osaka Australian Football League
- Japan Women's Footy

== Notable players ==
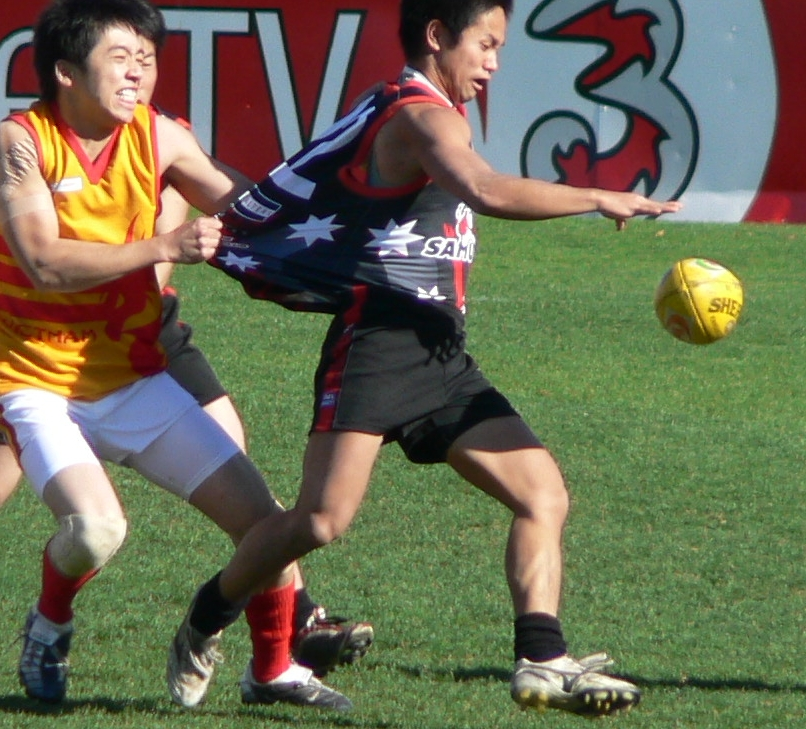
Michito Sakaki was captain of Japan and played with Essendon

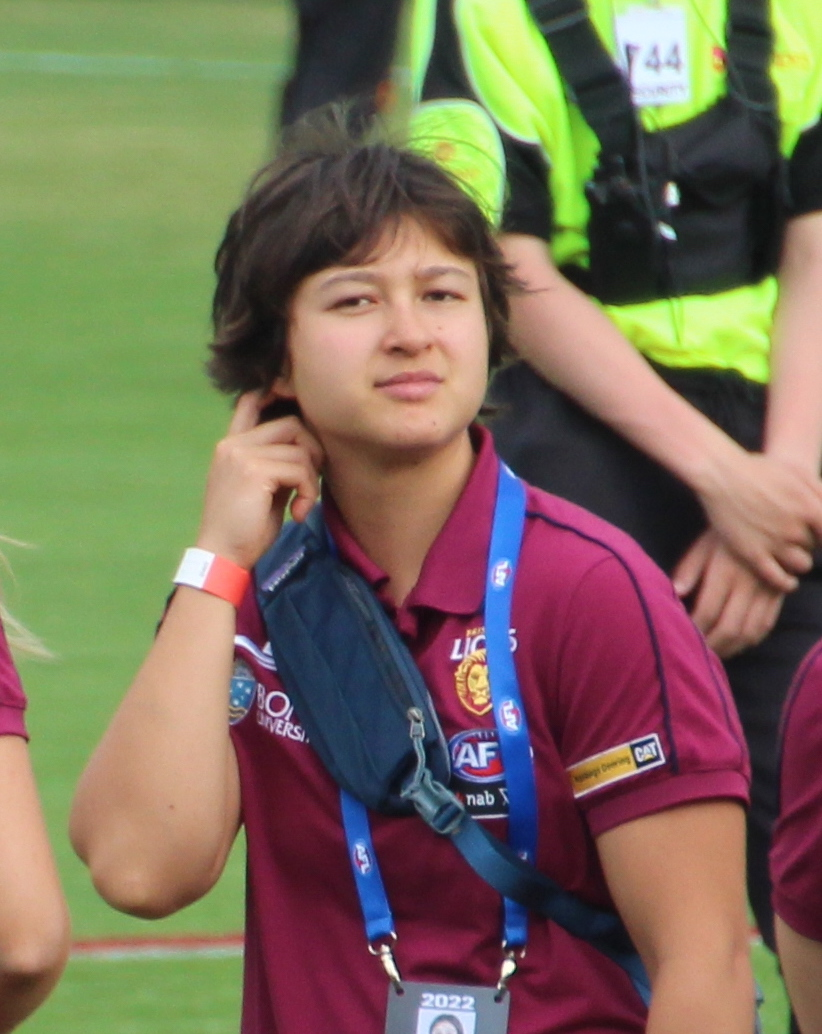
Luka Yoshida-Martin of the Brisbane Lions

=== Men's ===
Currently on an AFL senior list

Player	AFL Years*	AFL Matches*	AFL Goals*	Clubs played for/plays for	Connections to Japan, Notes
Mitchito Owens	2021-	13	13	St Kilda Football Club	Mother. Pick 2021 AFL draft
Alex Davies	2020-	17	8	Gold Coast Suns	Mother. Pre-listed 2020 AFL draft
Kai Pudney	2019-2020	-		Port Adelaide Football Club	Mother. Category B rookie
Sean Yoshiura	2010	-		Brisbane Lions	Born. No. 74, 2010 rookie draft. First drafted Japanese player
Michito Sakaki	2005	-		Essendon Football Club	Born and Raised. Captain of National Team. Played for reserves in pre-season
Tsuyoshi Kase	2005	-		Essendon Football Club	Born and Raised. Trained with Essendon

=== Women's ===
Currently on an AFLW senior list

Player	AFLW Years*	AFLW Matches*	AFLW Goals*	Clubs played for/plays for	Connections to Japan, Notes
Luka Yoshida-Martin	2022-	3	1	Brisbane Lions	Family

== See also ==
- AFL Japan
- List of Australian rules football leagues outside Australia
