= Japan national football team (disambiguation) =

The Japan men's national football team and the Japan women's national football team represent Japan in association football.

Japan national football team may also refer to:

- Japan national American football team
- Japan national Australian rules football team
