= Samoa national Australian rules football team =

National sports team

Samoa
- Nickname(s): The Kangaroos
- Governing body: AFL Samoa

Rankings
- Current: Not ranked (as of October 2022)

First international
- New Zealand 44 – 15 Samoa (1995)

International Cup
- Appearances: 3 (first in 2002)
- Best result: 5th (2008)

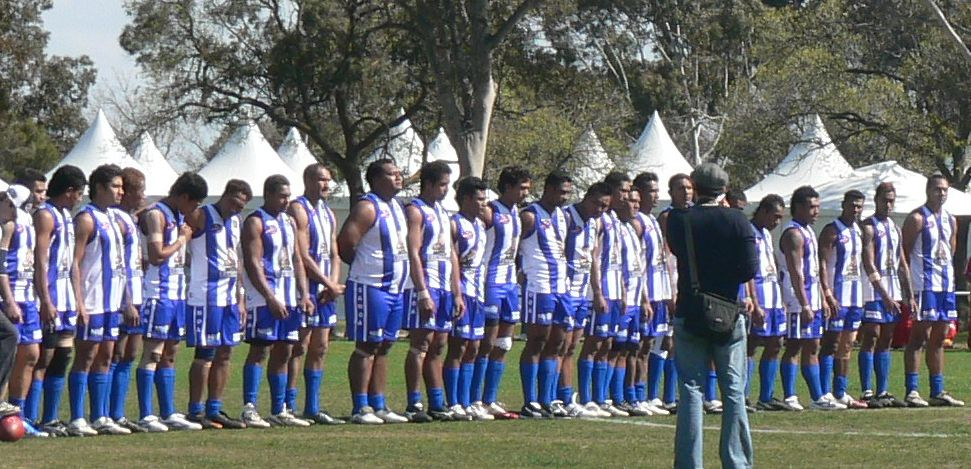
Samoans line up for the national anthem at the 2008 Australian Football International Cup.

The Samoan national Australian rules football team, nicknamed the Kangaroos (Samoan: Kāgalū), represents Samoa in the team sport of Australian rules football. The team is selected from the best Samoan born players, who are currently mostly players from the Samoa Australian Rules Football Association.

Samoa debuted internationally at the Arafura Games in 1999, where the team won the Bronze medal.

Between 1999 and 2002, Samoa played the occasional test match against other countries, most of them with loose eligibility rules, allowing Melbourne based Samoan players to participate.

Samoa competed against Nauru in 2001 during Nauru's tour of Australia. Among the Samoan representatives was a young Aaron Edwards.

Samoa sent a team to the inaugural 2002 Australian Football International Cup. The International Cup nation team was nicknamed the "Bulldogs" and wore the colours of the Western Bulldogs (who had donated the jumpers) which happen to be the same colours as the Flag of Samoa. Samoa finished 7th overall in the cup.

In 2004, Samoa fielded a side in the Australian Football Multicultural Cup and made it all the way through to the Grand Final, but were solidly defeated by Israel.

A much improved Samoa attended the 2005 International Cup, finishing in 5th position overall. Samoan players Fia Tootoo and Mateta Kirisome were selected in the International Cup All-Star team. Among the Samoan squad were future rugby internationals Mikaele Pesamino and Rambo Tavana.

The team appeared at the 2008 International Cup, but their nickname was changed to the "Kangaroos" and they now wear a similar strip to the North Melbourne Football Club. The affiliation with the Kangaroos came through the rise of Aaron Edwards in AFL's ranks, becoming a power forward and taking one of the best marks of the year for the Kangaroos in the 2007 AFL Finals Series. The Samoan-born North Melbourne star attended most of the games involving Samoa in person during the 2008 cup, although he was not allowed to represent Samoa under the AFL International Cup criteria. While Samoa began the cup with a strong win over India, Samoa's 2008 cup hopes were dashed after a drubbing at the hands of the Japan Samurai before being solidly defeated by the New Zealand Falcons.

The team performs the Siva tau (war dance) before each game.

== International competition ==
=== International Cup ===
- 2002: 7th
- 2005: 5th
- 2008: 10th
- 2011: Did not compete

=== Arafura Games ===
- 1995: Did not compete
- 1997: Did not compete
- 1999: 3rd
- 2001: Did not compete
