= AFL Japan =

Australian rules football league

Japan Australian Football League
- Sport: Australian rules football
- Founded: 2004
- No. of teams: 8
- Country: Japan
- Website: www.jafl.org

AFL Japan is a league and governing body for Australian rules football in Japan. The Top League season runs from April to November, with a summer break during August. All teams including the University teams compete in the Top League. The most successful team has been the Tokyo Goannas, who have been premiers since the inaugural Top League season. In 2007, the Osaka Dingoes joined the Top League. Since then the league has expanded with the addition of 3 new teams with the Nagoya Redbacks joining in 2009, the R246 Lions joining in 2012 (formerly known as the Tokyo Leopards) and just recently the Tokyo Bay Suns in 2013.

The Japan national Australian rules football team, the Japan Samurais, competed in the Australian Football International Cup in 2003, finishing 10th out of 11 competing countries, in 2005, finishing 7th out of 10 competing countries and 2008, finishing 8th out of 16 competing countries. In 2011, they finished 12th in division 1, beating Fiji and narrowly losing to Sweden along the way.

Their best and fairest player at the 2005 International Cup was Michito Sakaki. Sakaki, along with teammate Tsuyoshi Kase, was later invited to an Australian Football League/Australian Institute of Sport academy camp in Canberra. Sakaki subsequently trained with Essendon Football Club and later played Australian rules football in Australia. After returning to Japan, he became involved in developing Australian rules football domestically.

In 2022, Sakaki was serving as an AFL development officer in Japan and conducted an Australian football clinic at Akabane Elementary School in Tokyo during a visit by Australian Deputy Prime Minister Richard Marles.

== Top League ==
| Year | Premiers | Runners up |
|---|---|---|
| 2006 | Tokyo Goannas | Eastern Hawks |
| 2007 | Tokyo Goannas | Osaka Dingoes |
| 2008 | Tokyo Goannas | Eastern Hawks |
| 2009 | Tokyo Goannas | Eastern Hawks |
| 2010 | Tokyo Goannas | Nagoya Redbacks |
| 2011 | Osaka Dingoes | Eastern Hawks |
| 2012 | Tokyo Goannas | Osaka Dingoes |
| 2013 | Tokyo Bay Suns | Osaka Dingoes |

== Current Leagues & Clubs ==
- Top League
  - Tokyo Goannas
  - University Samurais
  - Eastern Hawks
  - Osaka Dingoes
  - Nagoya Redbacks
  - Tokyo Bay Suns
  - Komazawa University Magpies
  - Senshu University Power
  - R246 Lions

== See also ==
- Australian rules football in Japan
- List of Australian rules football leagues outside Australia
