= Australian rules football in Samoa =

- Country: Samoa
- Governing body: AFL Samoa
- National team: Samoa
- Nickname: Kangaroos
- First played: 1997
- Registered players: 240 (total); 108 (adult); 132 (junior)
- Clubs: 6

Australian rules football in Samoa has been played since 1997.

The governing body for the sport was formed under the name Samoa Australian Rules Football Association in 1998, becoming the AFL Samoa in 2007.

== History ==
Australian rules was introduced to Samoan schools in 1997.

In 2000 the Australian Defence Force (ADF) toured Samoa and played the first international against a national Samoan schoolboys side winning 20.22 (142) to 2.3 (15). The ADF conducted numerous clinics in the country with the aim of assisting Samoa to participate in the inaugural International Cup in 2002.

In early years, the game was typically played under derived rules known as 'Samoa Rules' and on rugby fields.

The Australia Network began televising games in Samoa in 2002.

AFL players to visit Samoa for coaching clinics include Dermott Brereton, Brad Johnson and Steve Kretiuk.

Australian football competition went into recess in 2006 following the 2005 Australian Football International Cup. In 2007 the AFL Samoa's programs were reinvigorated under new development officer in Michael Roberts, mainly focussing on junior and schoolboys' development.

There is a full-time development officer funded by AusAid, a junior development program and a schoolboy's tournament.

== National team ==
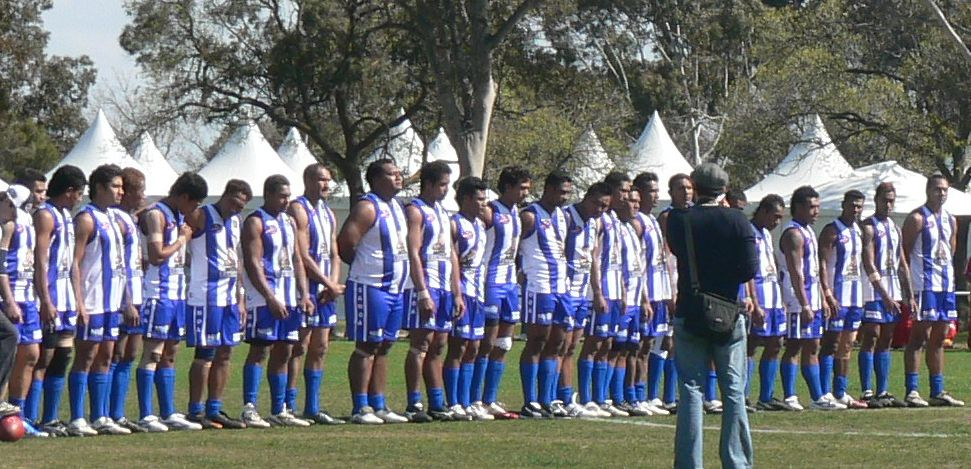
Samoans line up for the national anthem at the 2008 Australian Football International Cup.

The national team, which first competed at the Arafura Games was originally known as the Bulldogs, the name being chosen as the AFL's Western Bulldogs wore the Samoan national colours and has sent some professional players to visit the islands on clinics. The team was later renamed the 'Kangaroos', after forging ties with the North Melbourne Football Club.

== Participation ==
In 2004, Samoa had a total of 246 players including 80 senior players in 4 teams consisting of over 80 players and 166 juniors in six school sides.

According to the 2007 AFL International Census, these figures have not changed.

Over 5000 primary school children have experienced a 6-week plus program in 2007 with programs designed for each sector of primary school children developing skills from fundamental motor skills, body awareness activities and game specific skills.

The programs in primary schools year levels are titled 'Reach for the stars'(K-2), Kicking Goals (3-5), Let them Fly (6-8).

== Notable players ==
Fia Tootoo has represented Samoa on numerous occasions in the Australian Football International Cup and plays football semi-professionally in Australia.

Currently on an AFL senior list

Player	AFL Years*	AFL Matches*	Clubs played for/plays for	Connections to Samoa, References
Mykelti Lefau	-	-	Richmond (VFL) / Casey (VFL)	Father
Lamont Kalolo	-	-	Brisbane Lions Academy	
Shem Tatupu	-	-	Hawthorn (VFL)	Father
Karmichael Hunt	2011–2014	44	Gold Coast	Mother
Aaron Edwards	2003–2014	91	West Coast/North Melbourne/Richmond	Born Pago Pago. Mother
Mikaele Pesamino	-	-	-	Played for Samoa in 2005 International Cup, represented Samoa in rugby
Rambo Tavana	-	-	-	Played for Samoa in 2005 International Cup, represented Samoa in rugby
Fia Tootoo	-	-	-	Played for Samoa in International Cup

Currently on an AFLW senior list

Player	Years	AFLW Matches	Connections to Samoa, References
Vaomua Laloifi	2020–	15	Born

== Samoa Rules ==
Samoa Rules is a game derived from Australian rules football that has also been played in Samoa. The game is played on rugby fields and each team consists of 15 players per side.

Unlike Australian rules football, player movement is restricted to zones (similarly to Rec Footy). There is a line across the centre that backs and forwards can not cross. Onballers are allowed to go anywhere.

The Vailima Six-Shooters' Championship began in Samoa in 1998 under these rules, becoming known as Samoa Rules. A number of Samoa Rules players went on to represent Samoa in the Samoan national Australian rules football team, known originally as the Bulldogs and since 2008 as the "Kangaroos".
