= Michito Sakaki =

Japanese Australian rules footballer (born 1983)

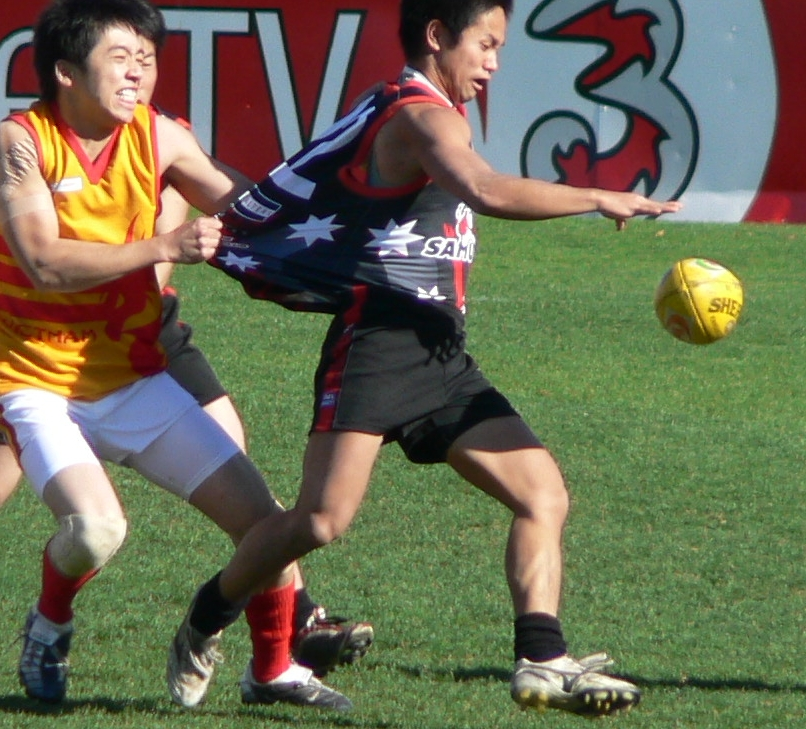

Personal information
- Full name: Michito Sakaki
- Born: 19 May 1983 (age 43); Japan
- Height: 165 cm (5 ft 5 in)
- Position: Midfielder

Playing career
Years	Club	Games (Goals)
2006	Wodonga Raiders	6 (1)

International team honours
Years	Team	Games (Goals)
2002, 2005, 2011, 2014, 2017	Japan	

Michito Sakaki (born 19 May 1983) is an Australian rules football player from Japan. Michito has achieved recognition as currently being one of the best and most successful players to learn and play the game outside of Australia, being named in the World Team 3 times, captaining Japan, playing pre-season matches with the Essendon Football Club and playing semi-professionally in Australia.

== Early life ==
Sakaki was originally a talented university soccer player at Waseda University. He was spotted playing soccer by an expatriate Australian, one of the members of the Tokyo Goannas, who convinced him to try Aussie Rules as well. Sakaki took quickly to Australian Football and began playing for the university's Australian Rules club, proving good enough to be selected in the national side.

== Australian rules football ==
Michito represented the Samurai, the Japanese national Australian rules football team, captaining the side in the Australian Football International Cups in both 2002 and 2005. In 2005, he was awarded with the best and fairest player for Japan in the competition.

A small midfielder/rover (165 cm, 68 kg), Michito impressed many at the tournament with his courageous play and ball winning ability. In a game against Great Britain, he virtually set up all his team's goals.

Sasaki, along with teammate Tsuyoshi Kase was later invited to join the Australian Football League/Australian Institute of Sport academy camp in Canberra.

Late in 2005, Michito was invited, along with Kase, to train with AFL club Essendon Football Club by coach Kevin Sheedy.

In January 2006, Sakaki played in an intra-club practice game for Essendon, gathering 13 possessions, including 8 kicks, 5 handballs and 2 marks.

In February 2006 it was announced that both Sakaki and Kase would be included on the Victorian Football League club that feeds the Essendon Bombers, the Bendigo Bombers, becoming the first overseas players to do so.

In late February, Sakaki was named in the Essendon side to play in a 16-a-side practice match against the Sydney Swans in an exhibition match at North Sydney Oval on 3 March in front of 9,654 spectators. Although the match was not an official AFL premiership match, Sakaki became the first non-Irish international and player having learn the game outside Australia to play for a senior AFL side. Michito announced his desire to play at the highest level and his intention to move to Australia to further his development.

Shortly after the announcement of the North Sydney practice match, a bidding war between amateur club St Bernards and the Wodonga Raiders ended up with Sakaki being signed by the Raiders and will play in the Ovens & Murray Football League.

Michito captained the Samurai during the 2008 International Cup and was once again named a member of the All-International (world) team.

In 2016, Sakaki was made AFL Japan Head of Game Development.

Representing Japan at the 2017 Australian Football International Cup Sakaki was once again named in the World Team, becoming just one of 5 players to have been named 3 or more times and one of the most capped players in the history of the international competition.

== See also ==
- Japan National Team
- AFL Japan
