= Tokyo Goannas =

Names
- Full name: Tokyo Goannas Australian Rules Football Club
- Nickname(s): Goannas

Club details
- Founded: 1991
- Colours: Red and white
- Competition: AFL Japan
- Premierships: JAFL Top League (6): 2006, 2007, 2008, 2009, 2010, 2012, 2015

Other information
- Official website: http://www.tokyogoannas.com/

The Tokyo Goannas Football Club is an Australian rules football team that was created in 1991 in Tokyo, Japan.

The club is a non-profit organization created to advance Australian Football and Australian sporting culture in Japan. It has won the Japan AFL (JAFL) championship trophy ten times. The club participates in the JAFL along with other teams in Tokyo, Nagoya, and Osaka.

The club's membership base includes expatriate residents, foreign nationals, and supporters. Past members have come from the United States, England, Ireland, and many local areas of Japan. The Goannas hold several events throughout the year, including a black-tie ball held at the Australian Embassy.

The club combines with other Japanese nationals to compete in the Asian Australian Football Championships which it has competed in since 2005 as the Japan Goannas. As the Japan Goannas it won the Men's Div 3 Champions in 2019.

== Japan AFL Top League Premierships ==
Year	Team	G.B.P	Team	G.B.P	Location
2006	Tokyo Goannas	8.7.55	Eastern Hawks	2.7.21	
2007	Tokyo Goannas	15.18.108	Nagoya Redbacks	12.12.84	
2008	Tokyo Goannas	26.11.167	Eastern Hawks	9.11.65	
2009	Tokyo Goannas	13.10.88	Eastern Hawks	6.14.50	Yokohama Country & Athletic Club
2010	Tokyo Goannas	12.15.87	Nagoya Redbacks	5.8.38	Yokohama Country & Athletic Club
2012	Tokyo Goannas	7.12.54	Osaka Dingoes	6.15.51	Yokohama Country & Athletic Club
2015	Tokyo Goannas	10.8.68	Tokyo Bay Suns	10.6.66	Yokohama Country & Athletic Club
