= 2008 Australian Football International Cup =

2008 AFL International Cup

Tournament details
- Host country: Australia
- Dates: 27 August – 5 September 2008
- Teams: 16

Final positions
- Champions: Papua New Guinea (1st title)
- Runners-up: New Zealand
- Third place: South Africa
- Fourth place: Ireland

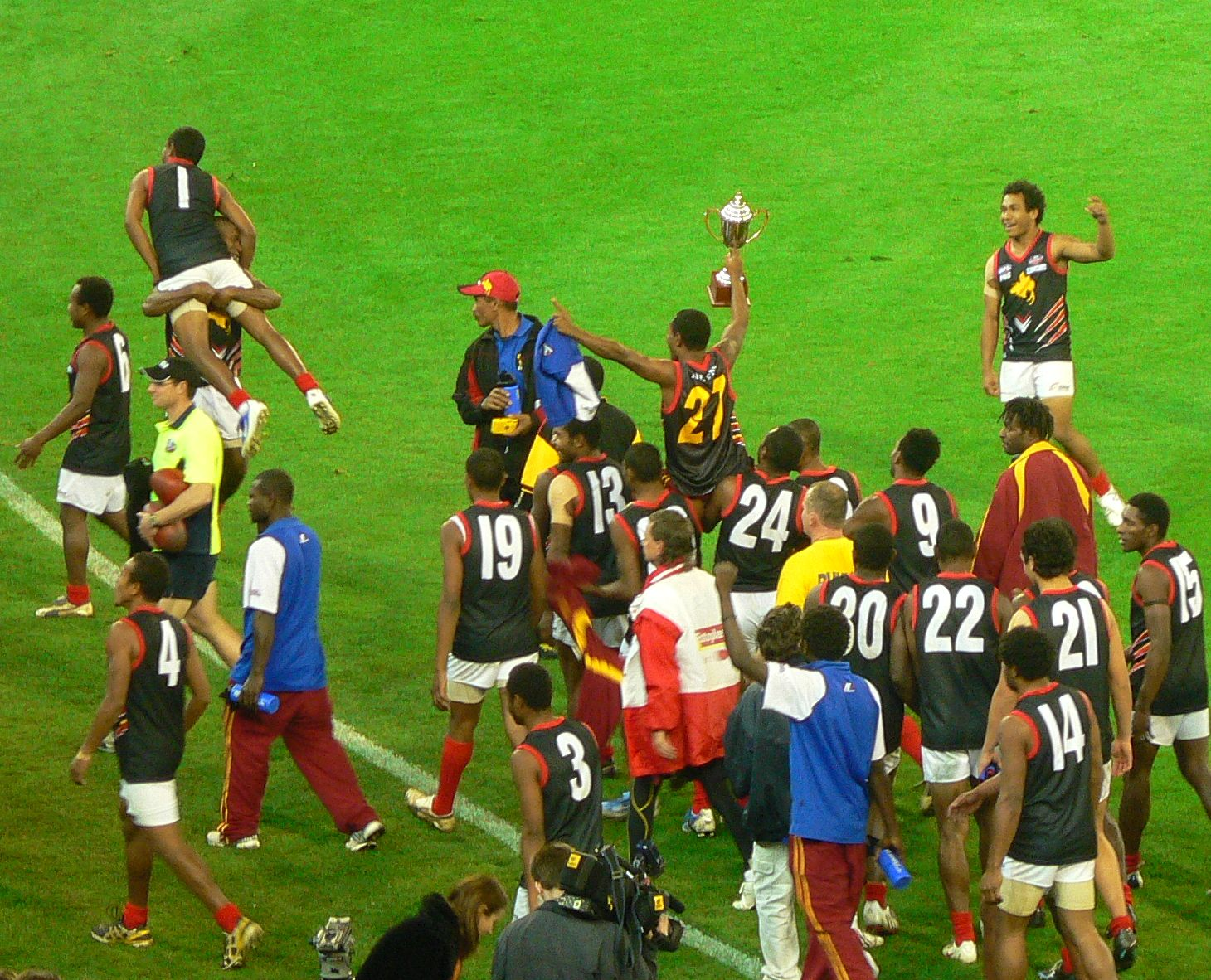
The victorious Papua New Guinea Mosquitos celebrate winning the cup for the first time

The 2008 Australian Football International Cup was the third time the Australian Football International Cup, an international Australian rules football competition, has been contested.

It was scheduled for 2008 (as part of the 150th year celebrations of Australian Football), with 16 nations competing.

The tournament was hosted by both Melbourne and Warrnambool in Victoria, Australia between 27 August and 6 September, with a single match additionally played in Geelong.

Like previous tournaments, the competition was open to men's teams with strict nationality eligibility rules.

The Grand Final was played between New Zealand and Papua New Guinea. Papua New Guinea were victorious by 8 points with a goal kicked after the siren. Like the Grand Final in previous years, the match was played at the Melbourne Cricket Ground as a curtain raiser to the 2008 AFL Second qualifying Final which attracted a crowd of 76,703 spectators. However unlike previous tournaments, the final was not televised.

== History and build up ==
The WAFL and Perth, Western Australia raised the possibility of bidding for the tournament soon after the 2005 cup had been completed, however the AFL has confirmed that the cup will once again be held in Melbourne for at least for one more year, as the 2008 Cup will coincide with Australian Rules football's 150th anniversary. The AFL later indicated that a regional round and semi-finals would be held in Warrnambool.

The AFL indicated that unlike earlier cups, it would likely be split into two divisions, a premier division and development division, with some discussion as to whether the eligibility rules could be loosened for the development division, to enable more countries to participate. Leagues were given the opportunity to nominate which they would prefer, with eight in each division being an initial target. Ultimately, this idea was dropped, with the sixteen teams being seeded into four pools.

In December 2007, it was announced that Melbourne and Warrnambool would co-host the two division event, with Melbourne matches to be played mainly in Royal Park North. Several potential new sides were announced by the AFL, including an Israeli-Palestine combination supported by the Peres Centre for Peace, China and India.

The USA Women's team announced an intention to send a squad to play against Australia and possibly Papua New Guinea. Additionally Canada and England announced their intentions to send Under 17s squads. As a result, there was speculation over an inaugural women's and under 17 divisions. However the AFL denied these divisions in favour of a senior men's competition only. In response, and with the Barassi International Australian Football Youth Tournament being cancelled, British and Canadian junior teams had to organise their own tours and matches against Australian schools. Despite both international teams being in Australia at the same time, they did not play against each other. The US women's team announced a 2009 tour instead.

== Competing nations ==
The AFL confirmed in July 2008 that sixteen nations will compete. In addition, there will be friendly matches played between Melbourne-based migrant community teams under the names "Team Africa" and "Team Asia", as well as the Tongan side which was unable to commit to the full tournament. Also despite a previous appearance, the Spain Bulls will not be competing.

Pool A	Pool B	Pool C	Pool D
New Zealand Falcons; Samoa Kangaroos; Japan Samurais; India Tigers	Papua New Guinea Mosquitos; (United Kingdom) Great Britain Bulldogs; Nauru Chiefs; (Israel) (Palestine) Peres Team for Peace	United States Revolution; South Africa Lions; Denmark Vikings; China Red Demons	(Republic of Ireland) Ireland Warriors; Canada Northwind; Sweden Elks; Finland Icebreakers

== Games ==
=== Round 1 ===
Team	Score	Team	Score	Ground	Date
(Republic of Ireland) Ireland Warriors	12.12 (84)	Sweden Elks	1.0 (6)	McAlister Oval	Wednesday, 27 August 11:00 AM
New Zealand Falcons	13.13 (91)	Japan Samurais	0.2 (2)	Ransford Oval	Wednesday, 27 August 11:00 AM
Canada Northwind	18.22 (130)	Finland Icebreakers	0.0 (0)	Western Oval	Wednesday, 27 August 11:00 AM
Samoa Kangaroos	16.20 (116)	India Tigers	1.0 (6)	McAlister Oval	Wednesday, 27 August 1:00 PM
(United Kingdom) Great Britain Bulldogs	20.15 (135)	(Israel) (Palestine) Peres Team for Peace	1.2 (8)	Ransford Oval	Wednesday, 27 August 1:00 PM
United States Revolution	11.6 (72)	Denmark Vikings	1.4 (10)	Western Oval	Wednesday, 27 August 1:00 PM
South Africa Lions	20.26 (146)	China Red Demons	0.0 (0)	McAlister Oval	Wednesday, 27 August 3:00 PM
Papua New Guinea Mosquitos	10.9 (69)	Nauru Chiefs	3.2 (20)	Ransford Oval	Wednesday, 27 August 3:00 PM

=== Round 2 ===
Team	Score	Team	Score	Ground	Date
New Zealand Falcons	35.19 (229)	India Tigers	0.0 (0)	Western Oval	Friday, 29 August 11:00 AM
(Republic of Ireland) Ireland Warriors	13.20 (98)	Finland Icebreakers	0.0 (0)	McAlister Oval	Friday, 29 August 11:00 AM
United States Revolution	16.18 (114)	China Red Demons	0.0 (0)	Ransford Oval	Friday, 29 August 11:00 AM
Papua New Guinea Mosquitos	20.20 (140)	(Israel) (Palestine) Peres Team for Peace	1.1 (7)	McAlister Oval	Friday, 29 August 1:00 PM
Samoa Kangaroos	4.7 (31)	Japan Samurais	8.7 (55)	Ransford Oval	Friday, 29 August 1:00 PM
(United Kingdom) Great Britain Bulldogs	2.6 (18)	Nauru Chiefs	10.5 (65)	Western Oval	Friday, 29 August 1:00 PM
Canada Northwind	16.12 (108)	Sweden Elks	1.1 (7)	Ransford Oval	Friday, 29 August 3:00 PM
South Africa Lions	9.11 (65)	Denmark Vikings	3.2 (20)	West Kardinia Oval	Saturday, 30 August 12:00 PM

=== Round 3 ===
Team	Score	Team	Score	Ground	Date
(Republic of Ireland) Ireland Warriors	4.6 (30)	Canada Northwind	2.2 (14)	Reid Oval	Monday, 1 September 11:00 AM
Sweden Elks	6.7 (43)	Finland Icebreakers	2.2 (14)	Reid Oval	Monday, 1 September 11:00 AM
New Zealand Falcons	10.11 (71)	Samoa Kangaroos	1.2 (8)	Walter Oval	Monday, 1 September 11:00 AM
Japan Samurais	15.16 (106)	India Tigers	0.0 (0)	Mack Oval	Monday, 1 September 1:00 PM
United States Revolution	5.6 (36)	South Africa Lions	8.10 (58)	Reid Oval	Monday, 1 September 1:00 PM
Papua New Guinea Mosquitos	7.9 (51)	(United Kingdom) Great Britain Bulldogs	3.2 (20)	Walter Oval	Monday, 1 September 1:00 PM
Denmark Vikings	17.20 (122)	China Red Demons	0.0 (0)	Reid Oval	Monday, 1 September 3:00 PM
Nauru Chiefs	28.9 (177)	(Israel) (Palestine) Peres Team for Peace	1.1 (7)	Walter Oval	Monday, 1 September 3:00 PM

== Group Results After Rounds ==
=== Pool A ===
Position	Team	Played	Won	Lost	Drawn	Points For	Points Against	%	Points
1	New Zealand Falcons	3	3	0	0	391	10	3910.00	12
2	Japan Samurais	3	2	1	0	163	112	145.53	8
3	Samoa Kangaroos	3	1	2	0	155	133	113.13	4
4	India Tigers	3	0	3	0	6	451	1.33	0

=== Pool B ===
Position	Team	Played	Won	Lost	Drawn	Points For	Points Against	%	Points
1	Papua New Guinea Mosquitos	3	3	0	0	260	47	553.19	12
2	Nauru Chiefs	3	2	1	0	262	94	278.72	8
3	(United Kingdom) Great Britain Bulldogs	3	1	2	0	173	124	139.51	4
4	(Israel) (Palestine) Peres Team for Peace	3	0	3	0	22	452	4.86	0

=== Pool C ===
Position	Team	Played	Won	Lost	Drawn	Points For	Points Against	%	Points
1	South Africa Lions	3	3	0	0	269	56	480.35	12
2	United States Revolution	3	2	1	0	222	68	326.47	8
3	Denmark Vikings	3	1	2	0	152	137	110.94	4
4	China Red Demons	3	0	3	0	0	382	0.00	0

=== Pool D ===
Position	Team	Played	Won	Lost	Drawn	Points For	Points Against	%	Points
1	(Republic of Ireland) Ireland Warriors	3	3	0	0	212	20	1060.00	12
2	Canada Northwind	3	2	1	0	252	37	681.08	8
3	Sweden Elks	3	1	2	0	56	206	27.18	4
4	Finland Icebreakers	3	0	3	0	14	271	5.16	0

== Finals ==
=== Finals Round 1 ===
Team	Score	Team	Score	Ground	Date
Samoa Kangaroos	7.8 (50)	Sweden Elks	4.2 (26)	Mack Oval	Wednesday, 3 September 1:00 PM
India Tigers	4.4 (28)	Finland Icebreakers	8.4 (52)	Reid Oval	Wednesday, 3 September 1:00 PM
Nauru Chiefs	7.3 (45)	United States Revolution	3.5 (23)	Walter Oval	Wednesday, 3 September 1:00 PM
(Israel) (Palestine) Peres Team for Peace	5.7 (37)	China Red Demons	4.4 (28)	Mack Oval	Wednesday, 3 September 3:00 PM
(United Kingdom) Great Britain Bulldogs	5.4 (34)	Denmark Vikings	4.3 (27)	Reid Oval	Wednesday, 3 September 3:00 PM
Japan Samurais	0.3 (3)	Canada Northwind	7.7 (49)	Walter Oval	Wednesday, 3 September 3:00 PM
New Zealand Falcons	8.9 (57)	(Republic of Ireland) Ireland Warriors	2.3 (15)	Reid Oval	Wednesday, 3 September 5:30 PM
Papua New Guinea Mosquitos	9.8 (63)	South Africa Lions	2.3 (15)	Reid Oval	Wednesday, 3 September 7:30 PM

=== Finals Round 2 ===
Team	Score	Team	Score	Ground	Date
Playoff for 13th and 14th
Finland Icebreakers	2.2 (14)	(Israel) (Palestine) Peres Team for Peace	14.5 (89)	Western Oval	Friday, 5 September 10:00 AM
Playoff for 9th and 10th
(United Kingdom) Great Britain Bulldogs	8.9 (57)	Samoa Kangaroos	1.11 (17)	Ransford Oval	Friday, 5 September 10:00 AM
Playoff for 5th and 6th
Nauru Chiefs	12.8 (80)	Canada Northwind	7.7 (49)	Ransford Oval	Friday, 5 September 10:15 AM
Playoff for 11th and 12th
Sweden Elks	0.2 (2)	Denmark Vikings	14.19 (103)	Western Oval	Friday, 5 September 11:45 AM
Playoff for 7th and 8th
United States Revolution	14.13 (97)	Japan Samurais	2.4 (16)	McAlister Oval	Friday, 5 September 11:45 AM
Playoff for 3rd and 4th
(Republic of Ireland) Ireland Warriors	5.2 (32)	South Africa Lions	4.9 (33)	Ransford Oval	Friday, 5 September 12:00 PM
Playoff for 15th and 16th
India Tigers	6.6 (42)	China Red Demons	7.14 (56)	Ransford Oval	Friday, 5 September 1:45 PM
Grand Final
New Zealand Falcons	7.4 (46)	Papua New Guinea Mosquitos	7.12 (54)	Melbourne Cricket Ground	Friday, 5 September 5:30 PM

=== Knockout-Chart (Final 4) ===
Semi-finals
A1	New Zealand	8	9	57
D1	Ireland	2	3	15
B1	Papua New Guinea	9	9	63
C1	South Africa	2	3	15

Grand Final
WSF1	New Zealand	7	4	46
WSF2	Papua New Guinea	7	12	54
Bronze medal match
LSF1	Ireland	5	2	32
LSF2	South Africa	4	9	33

== Individual awards ==
=== World Team ===
The world team was selected based on player performance in the pool rounds only. India, China, the Peace Team and Finland all missed representation in the team.

Player	Nation	Club	Position
Donald Barry	Papua New Guinea	Gulf	Half back flank
Joe Lla	Papua New Guinea	Central	Ruck rover
Overa Gibson	Papua New Guinea	Gulf	Centre half forward
Stanis Susuve	Papua New Guinea	Gulf	Interchange
Richard Bradley	New Zealand	Eastern Blues	Full-forward
Andrew Crighton	New Zealand	North Shore Tigers	Fullback
Andrew Congalton	New Zealand	Takapuna Eagles	Interchange
Mike Finn	(Republic of Ireland) Ireland	Heidelberg Tigers/Caulfield Bears (VIC)	Centre half back
Ian O'Sullivan	(Republic of Ireland) Ireland	Leeside Lions	Forward pocket
Cian Quigley	(Republic of Ireland) Ireland	Leeside Lions	Interchange
Julian Horn	South Africa	North West Province	Back pocket
Thabiso Phakedi	South Africa	North West Province	Back pocket
Scott Fleming	Canada	Vancouver Cougars	Forward pocket
Emmanuel Mattata	Canada	Etibicoke Kangaroos	Ruck
Agir Amwano	Nauru	Tigers	Centre
Torio Mwareow	Nauru	Navarre Football Club	Half-forward flank
Aiden Dillane	(United Kingdom) Great Britain	Putney Magpies	Half-forward flank
Luke Matias	(United Kingdom) Great Britain	Caulfield (SFL, VIC)/Nottingham	Interchange
Páll Tómas Finnsson	Denmark	Jylland	Wing
Jen Djernes	Denmark	Jylland	Interchange
Chris Candelaria	United States	Denver Bulldogs	Interchange
Michito Sakaki	Japan	Waseda University	Rover
Fia Tootoo	Samoa	Moorabbin Kangaroos	Half back flank
Andreas Svensson	Sweden	Landskrona Bulldozers	Wing

IC2008 World Team
B:	(South Africa) Thabiso Phakedi	(New Zealand) Andrew Crighton	(South Africa) Julian Horn
HB:	(Papua New Guinea) Donald Barry	(Republic of Ireland) Mike Finn	(Samoa) Fia-Tootoo
C:	(Sweden) Andreas Svensson	(Nauru) Agir Amwano	(Denmark) Pa'll Finnsson
HF:	(Nauru) Torio Mwareow	(Papua New Guinea) Overa Gibson	(United Kingdom) Aiden Dillane
F:	(Republic of Ireland) Ian O'Sullivan	(New Zealand) Richard Bradley	(Canada) Scott Fleming
Foll:	(Canada) Emmanuel Mattata	(Papua New Guinea) Joe Lla	(Japan) Michito Sakaki
Int:	(United Kingdom) Luke Matias	(Papua New Guinea) Stanis Susuve	(New Zealand) Andrew Congalton
Int:	(Republic of Ireland) Cian Quicgley	(United States) Chris Candelaria	(Denmark) Jes Djernes
Coach:	Not Named		

=== Tournament Best & Fairest winners ===
Player	Nation	Club
Mike Finn	(Republic of Ireland) Ireland	Heidelberg Football Club

== Gallery ==
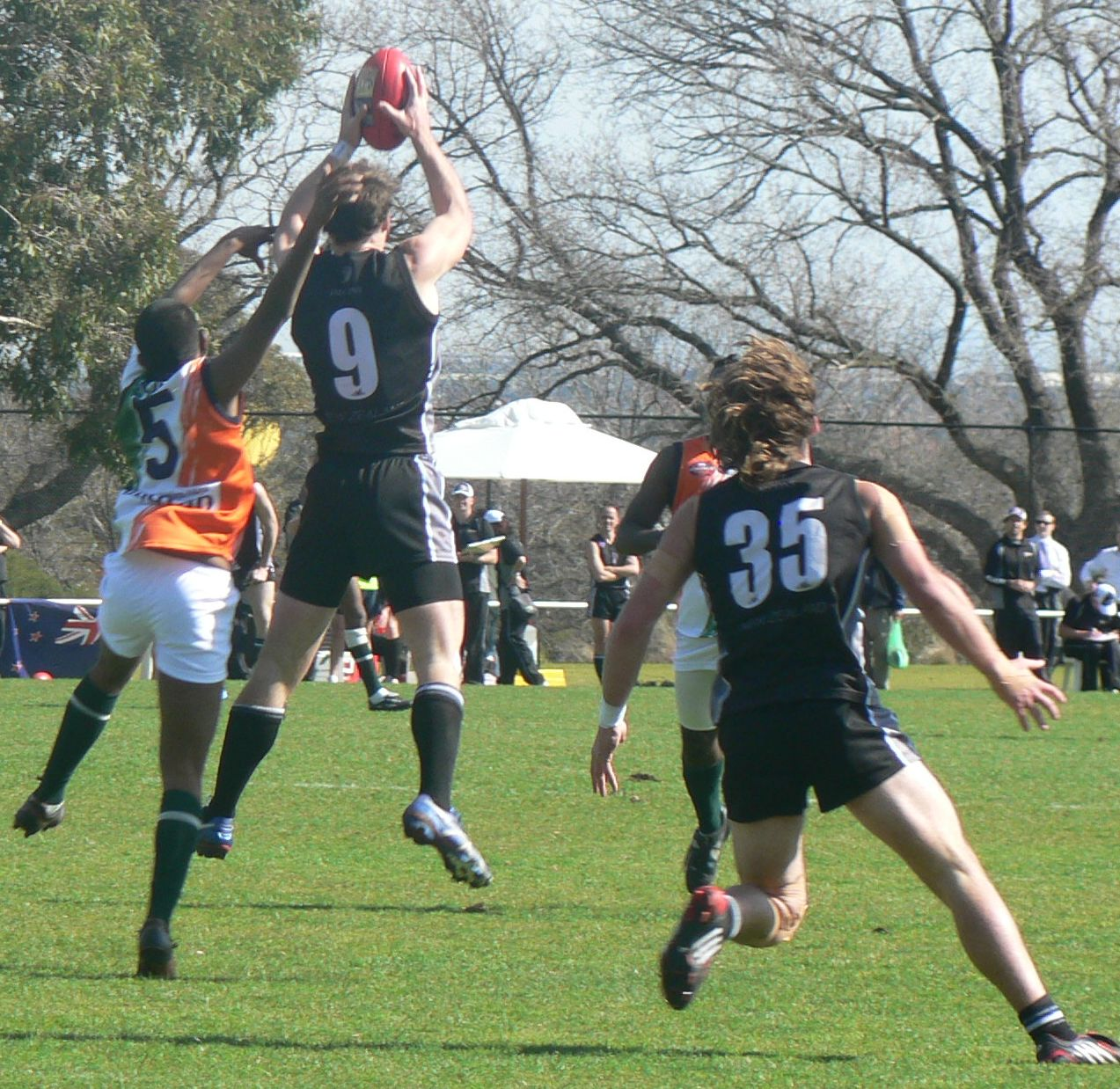
New Zealand's captain Andrew Congalton takes a strong mark in front of an Indian opponent

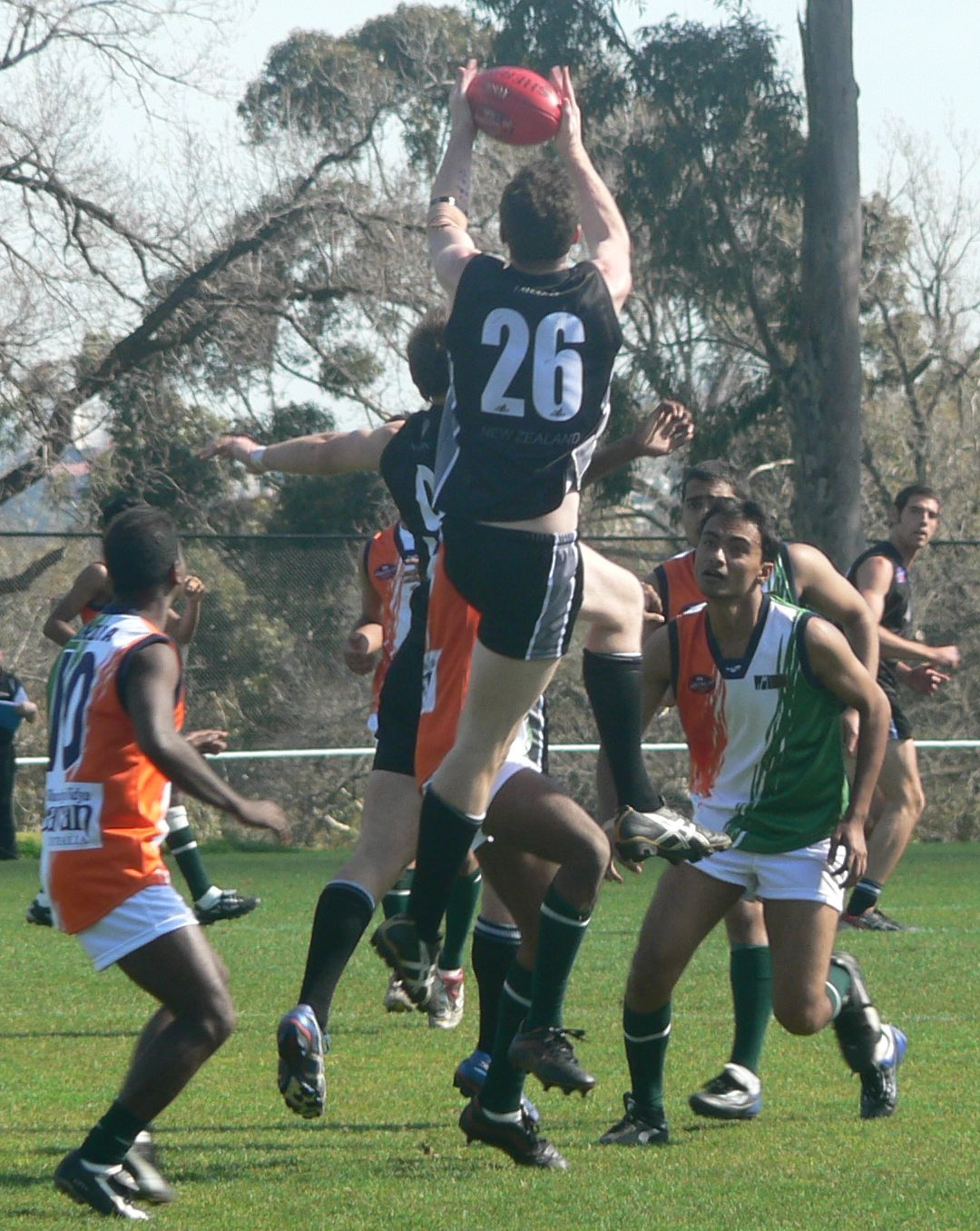
New Zealand's Richard Bradley takes a high mark against India

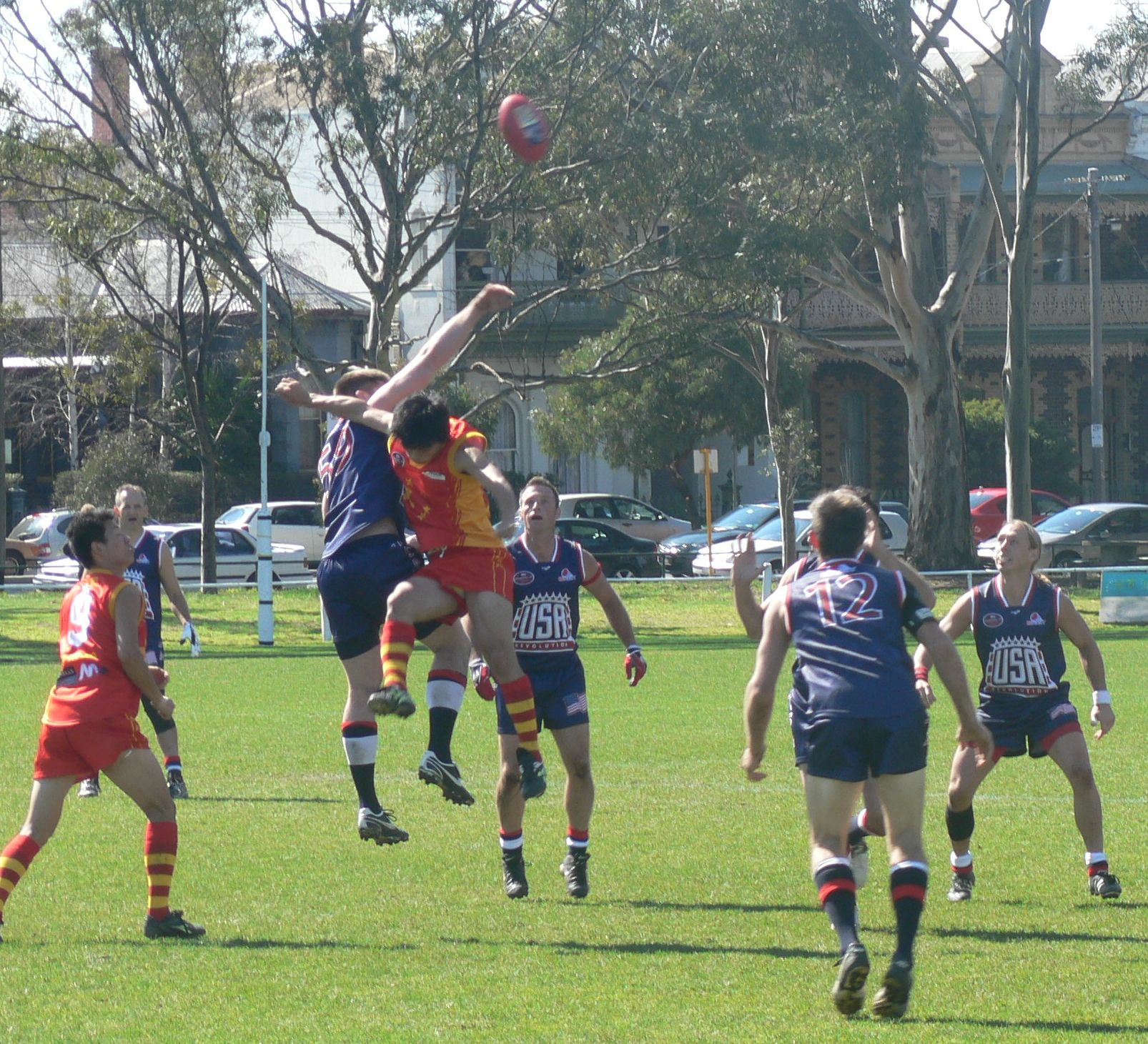
The USA and China contest the ruck

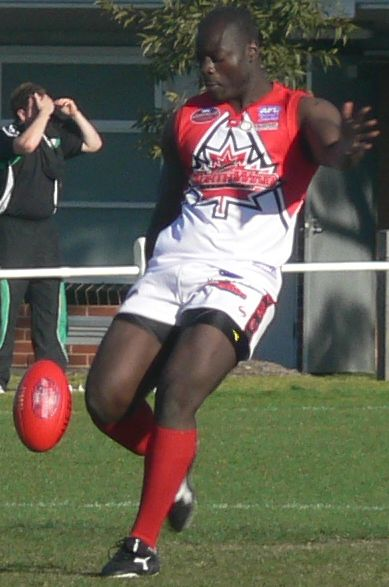
Canada's ruckman Manny Matata takes a kick against Sweden in round 2

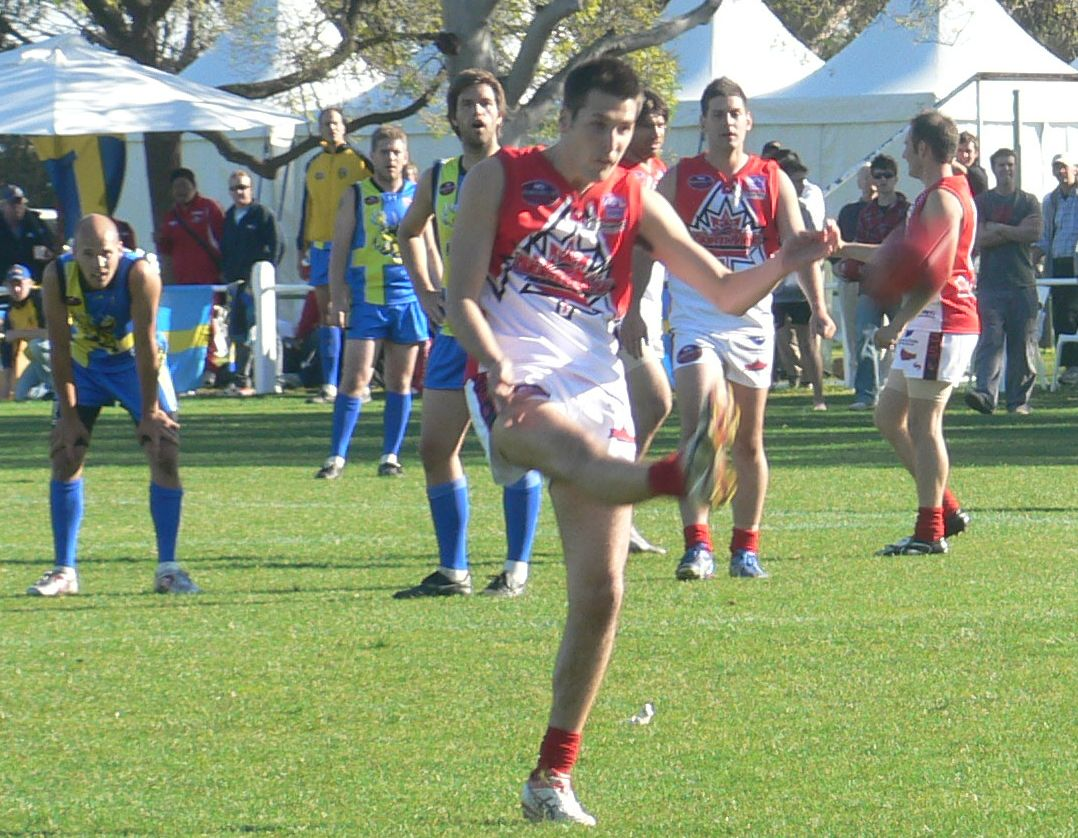
Canada's Scott Fleming kicks one of eight goals against Sweden in round 2

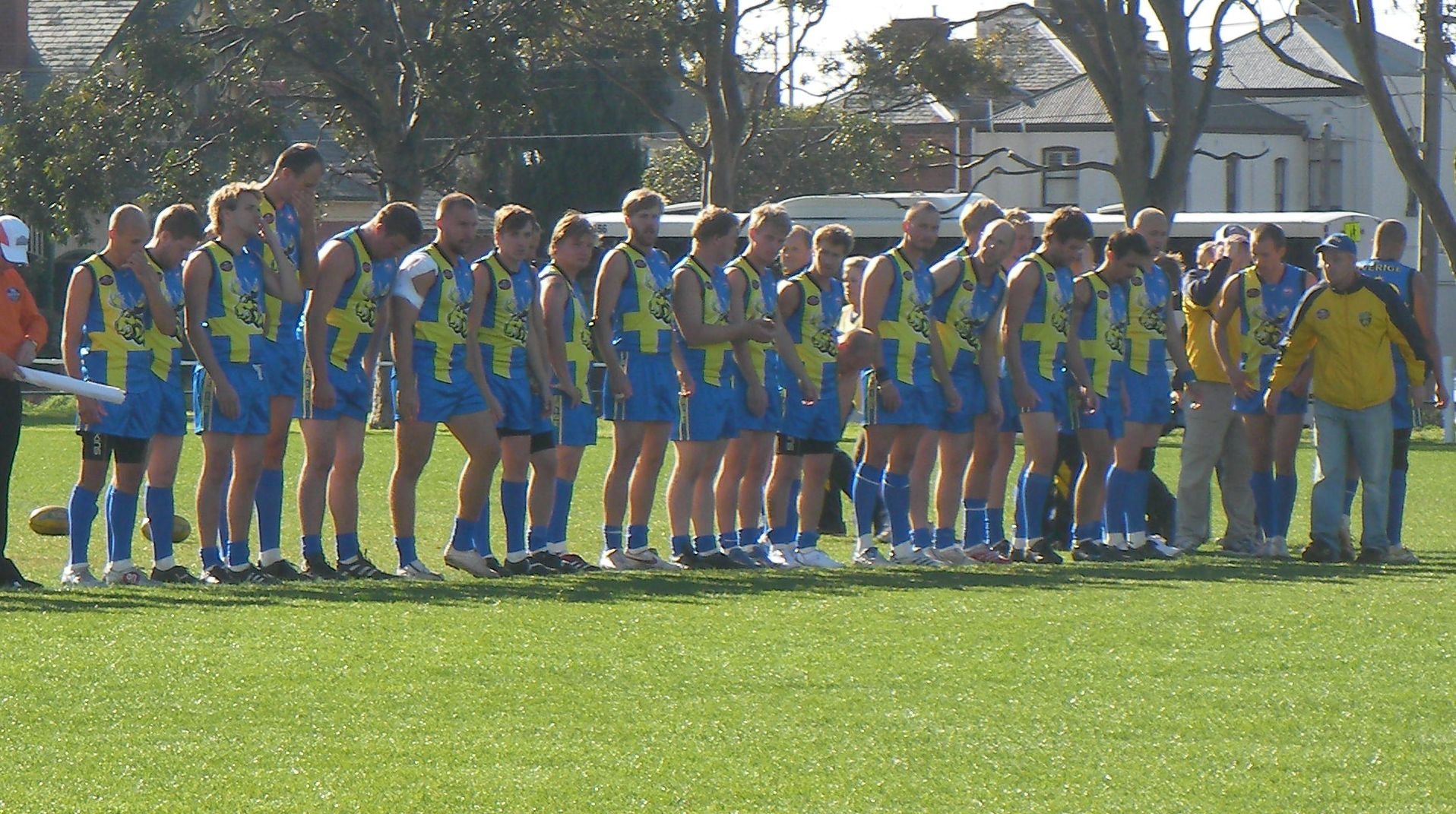
Swedish team lines up for the national anthem before taking on Canada

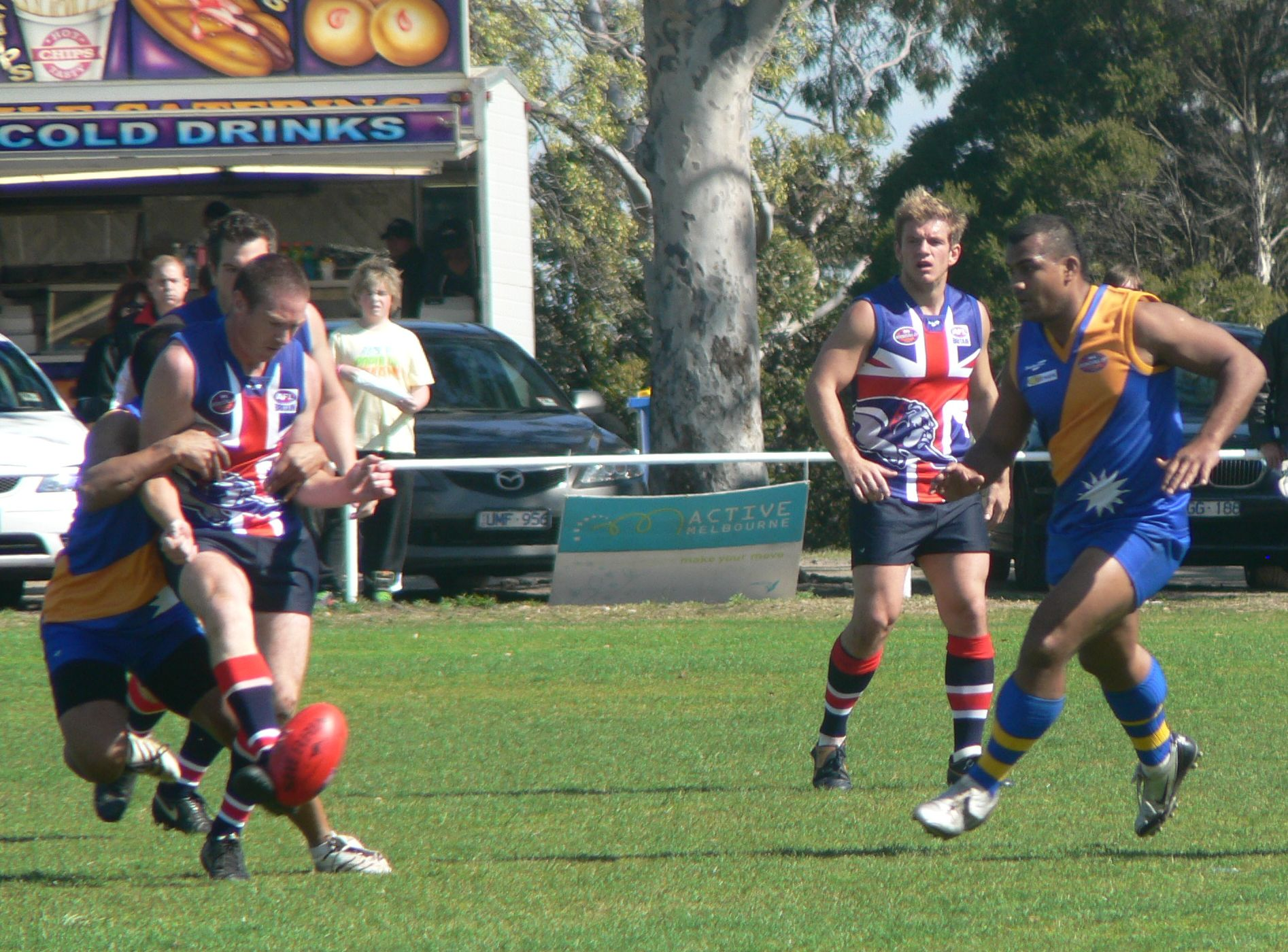
A British Bulldog gets a kick away despite close checking from a Nauruan opponent in Britain's round 2 loss

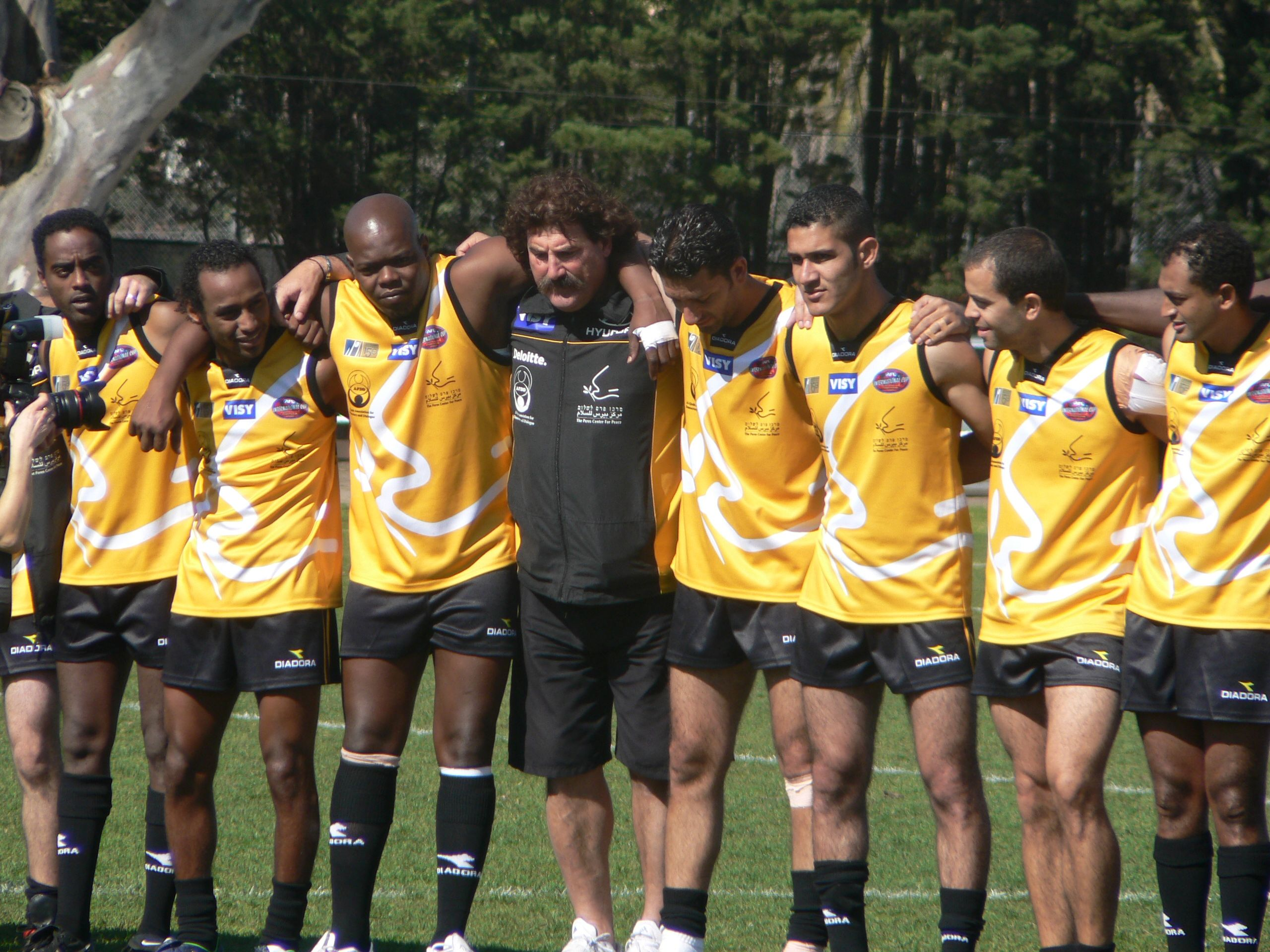
Robert Dipierdomenico coach of the Peres Peace team joining with his team to sign the joint anthem

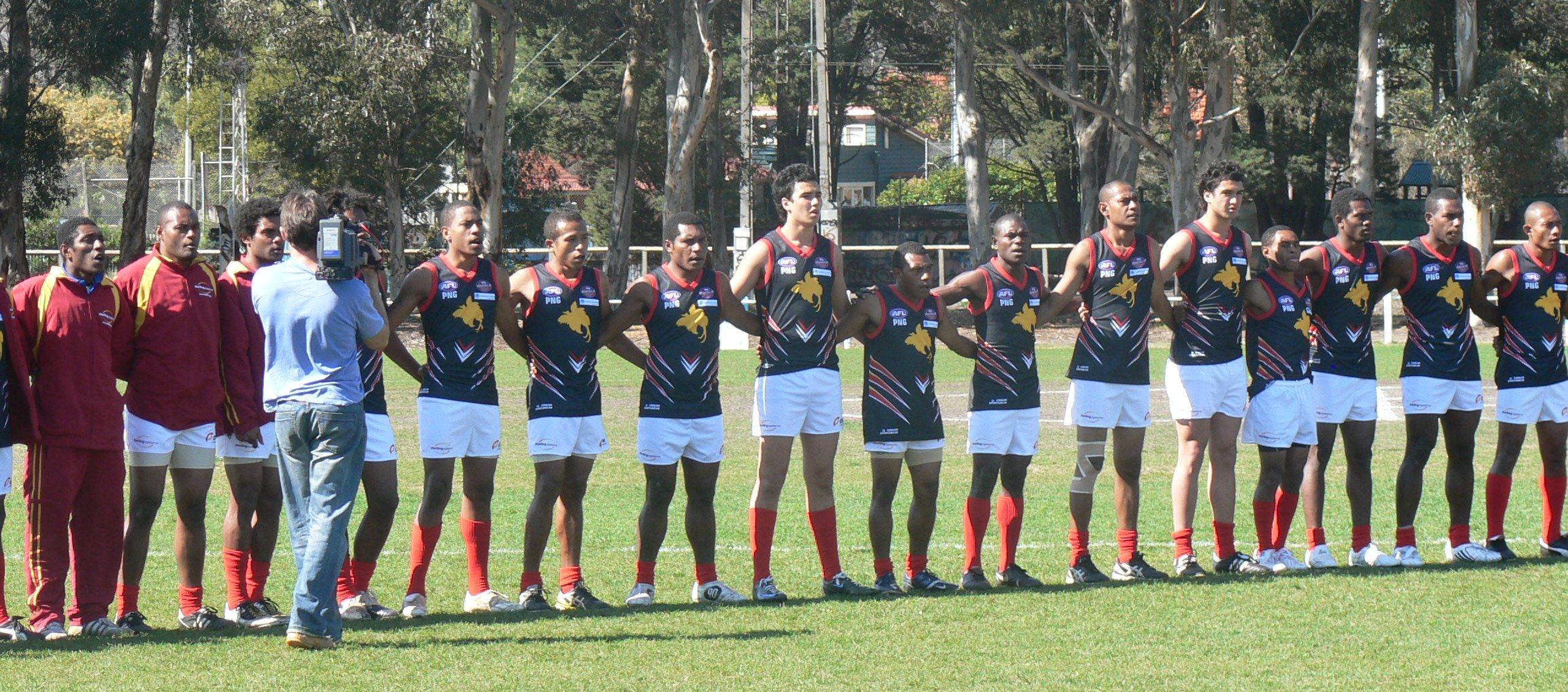
The Papua New Guinea Mosquitos line up for the national anthem before taking on the Peace Team

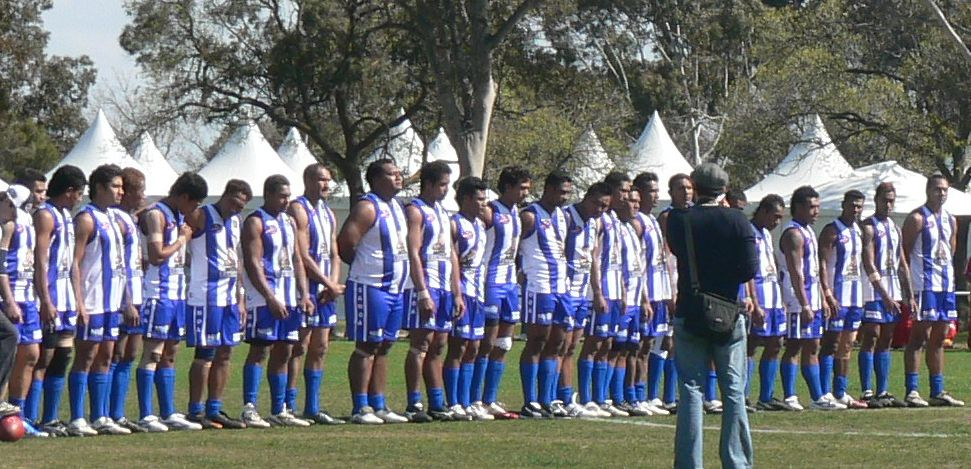
Samoa lines up for the national anthem before taking on Japan in round 2

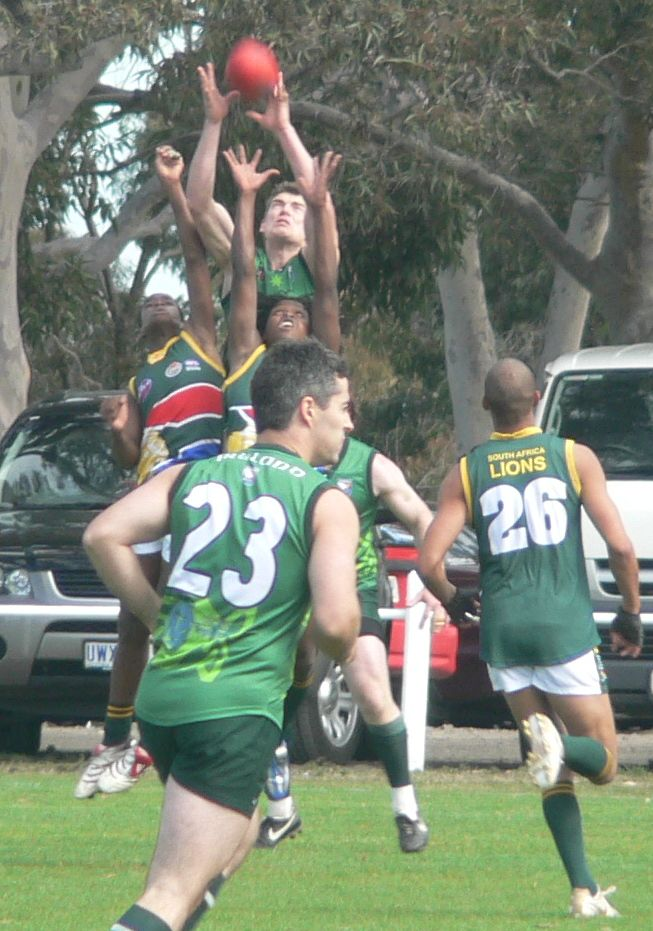
Big pack mark by Ireland's Mike Finn over South Africa

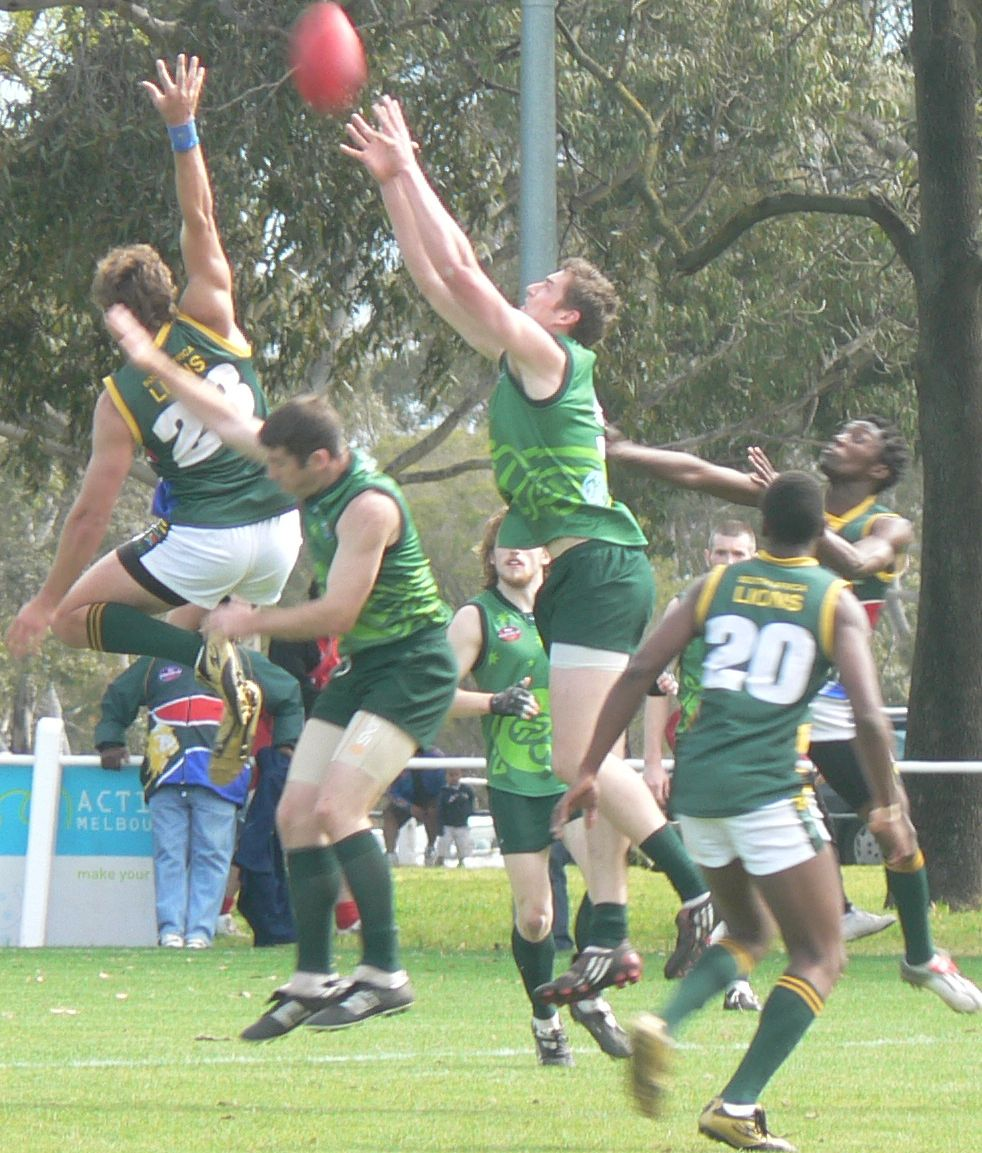
Another Mike Finn special

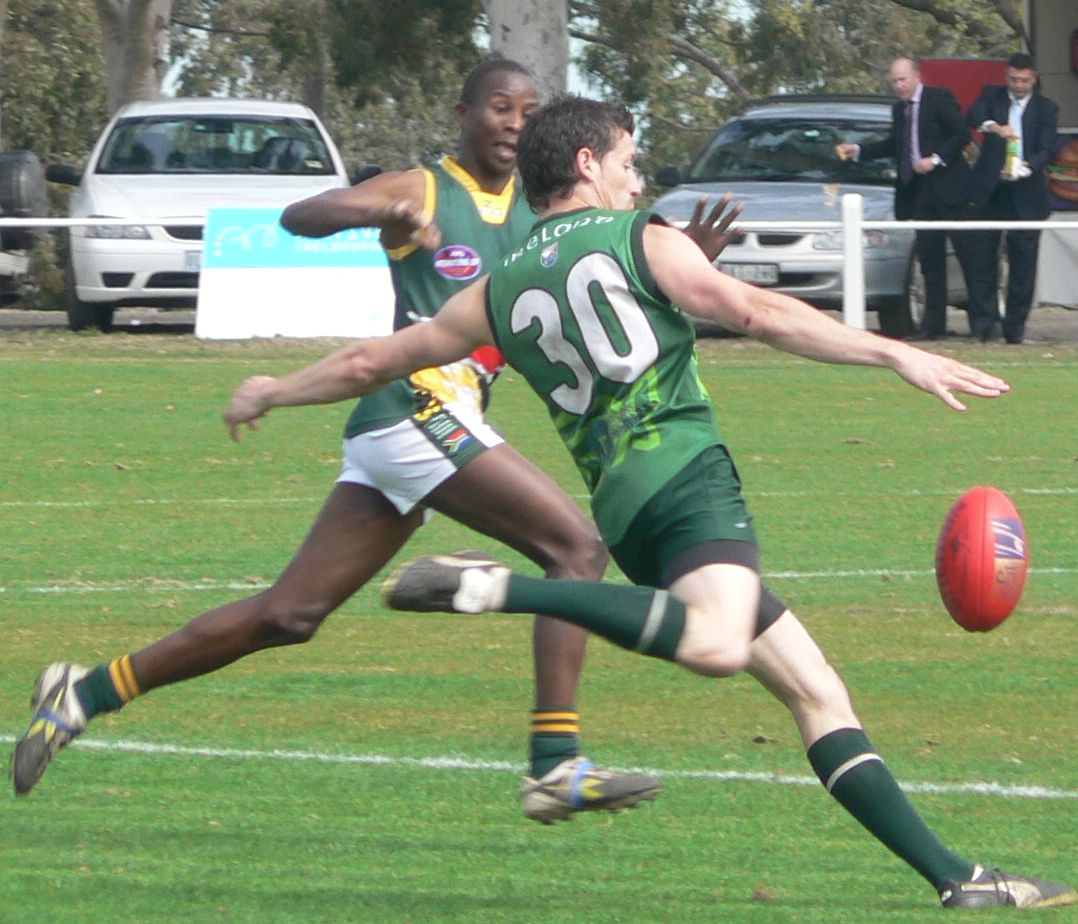
Irish player gets a kick downfield

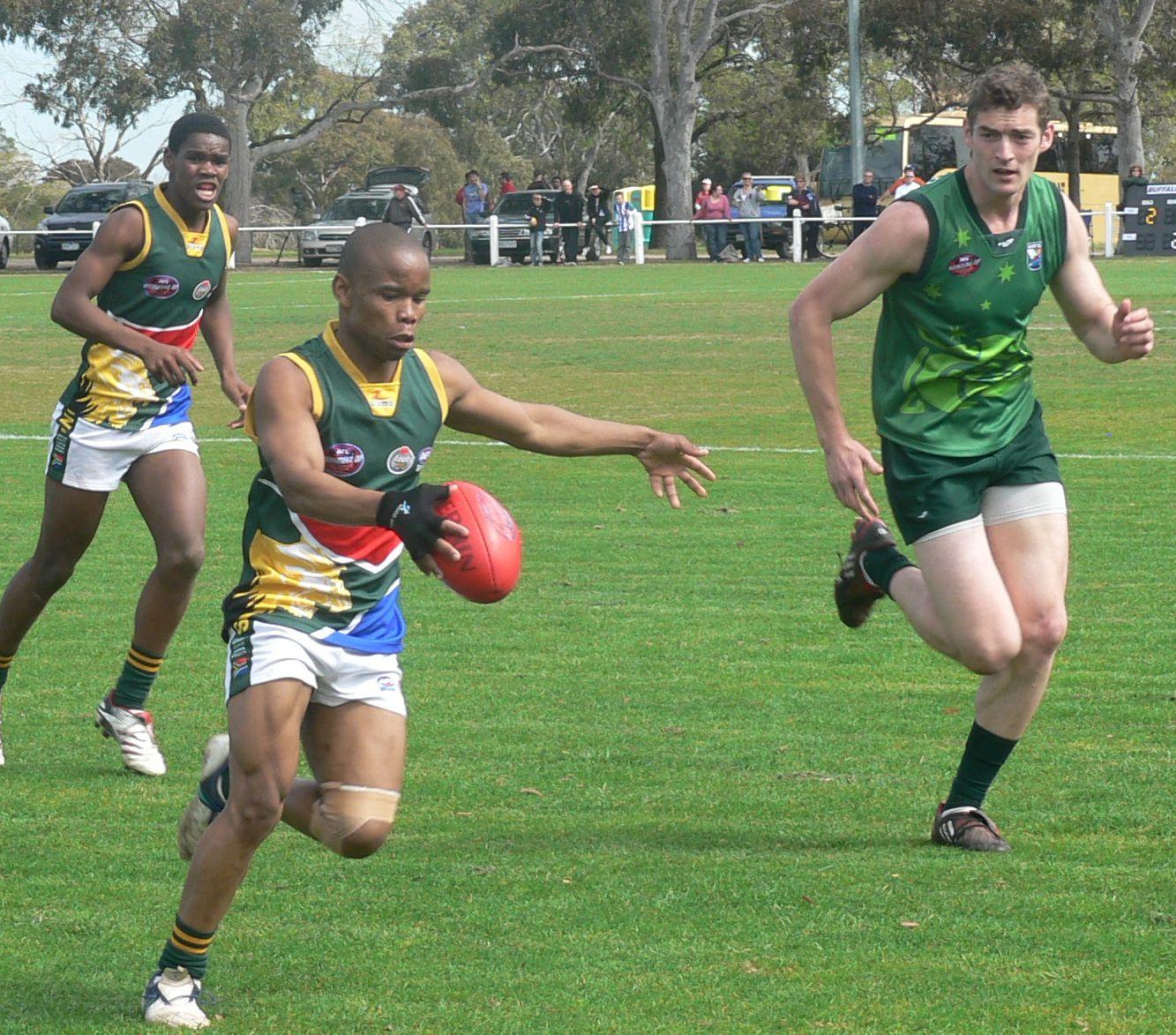
South African player kicks the ball against Ireland

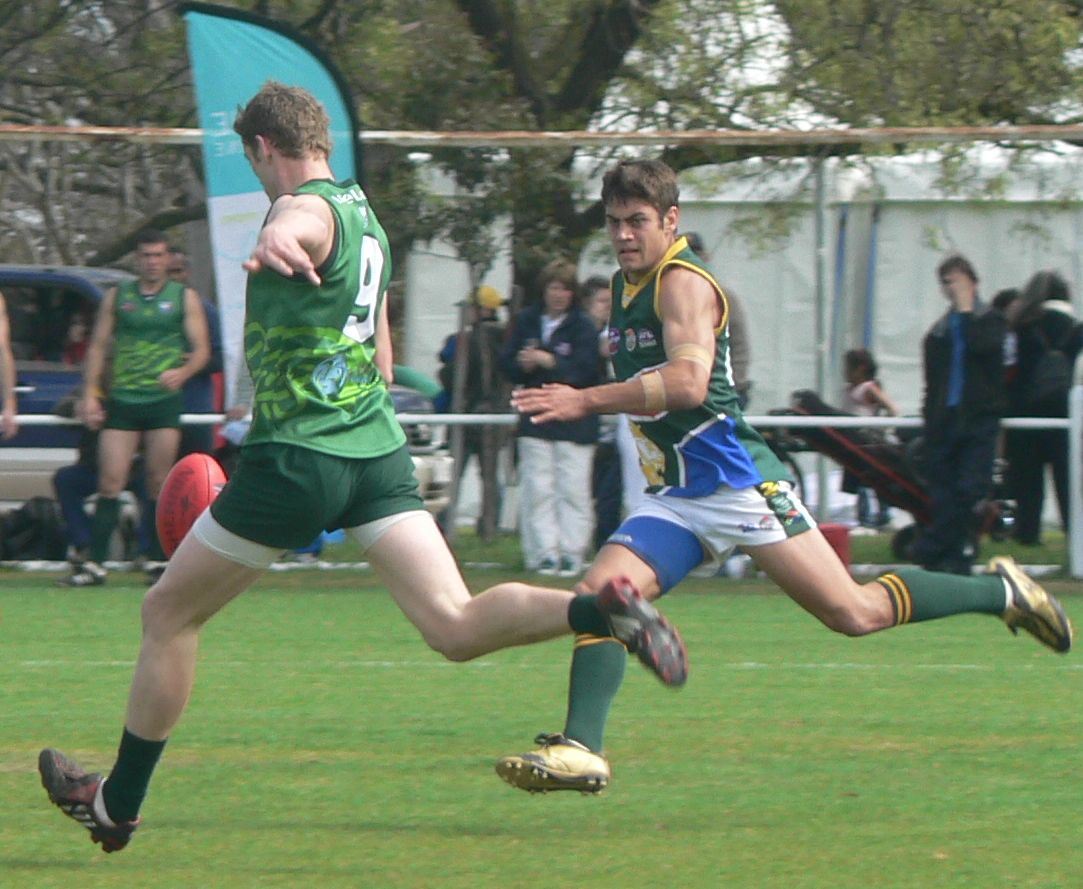
Running shot for goal by Ireland's Mike Finn

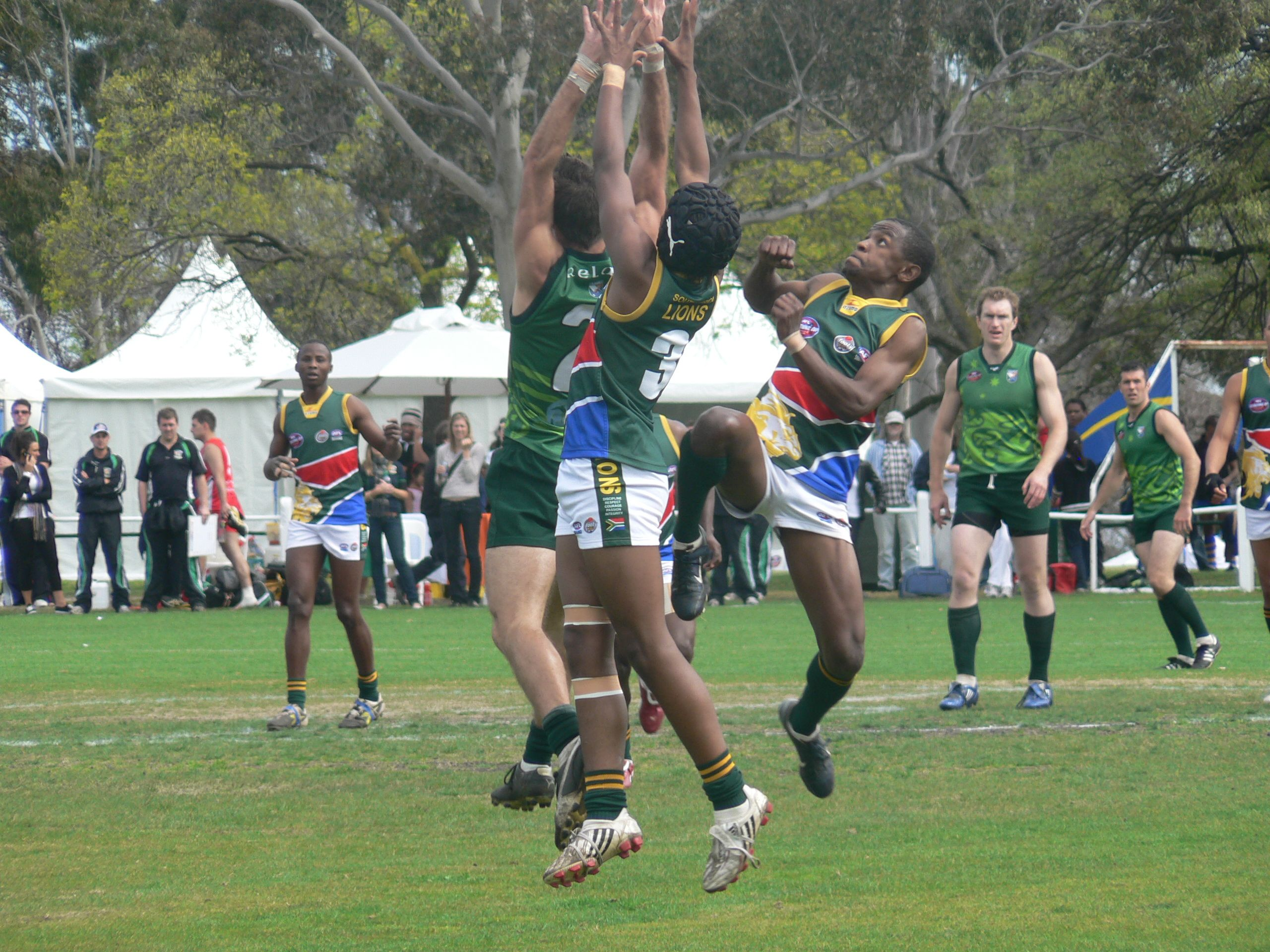
South Africa and Ireland contest the high ball with South African attempting to spoil

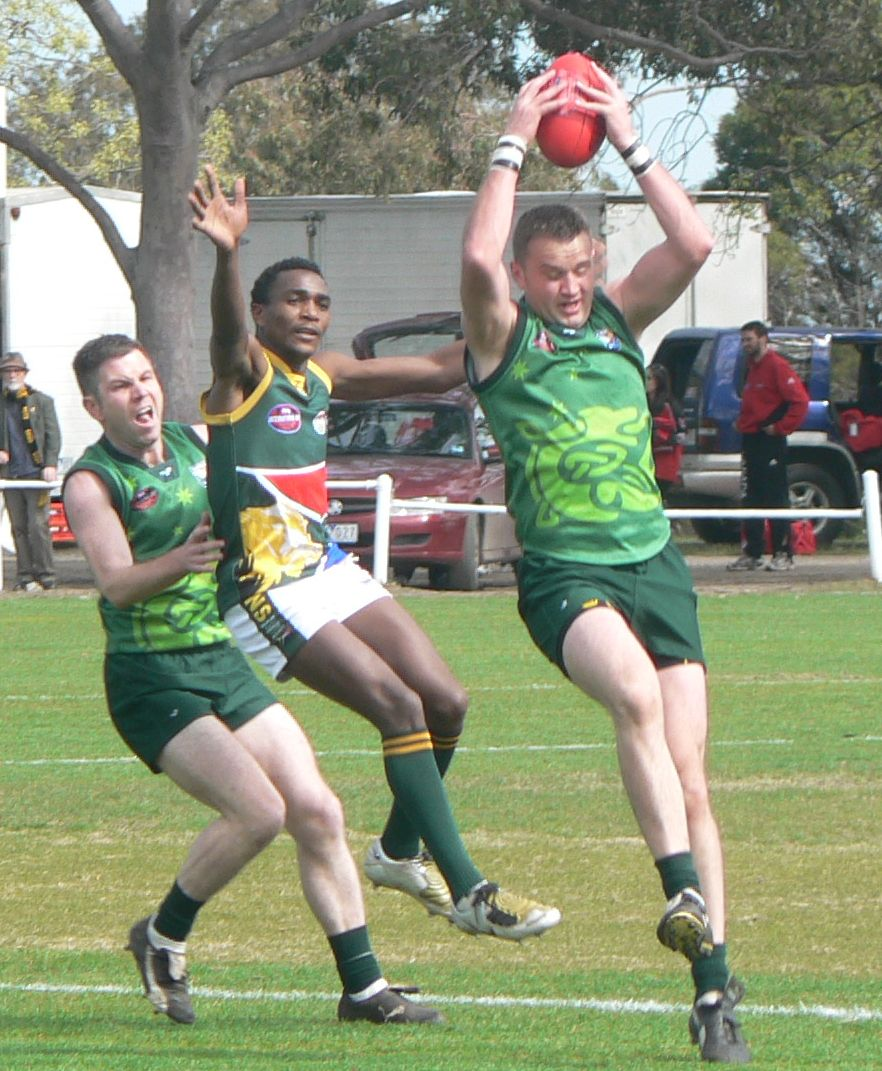
Irish player takes an overhead mark

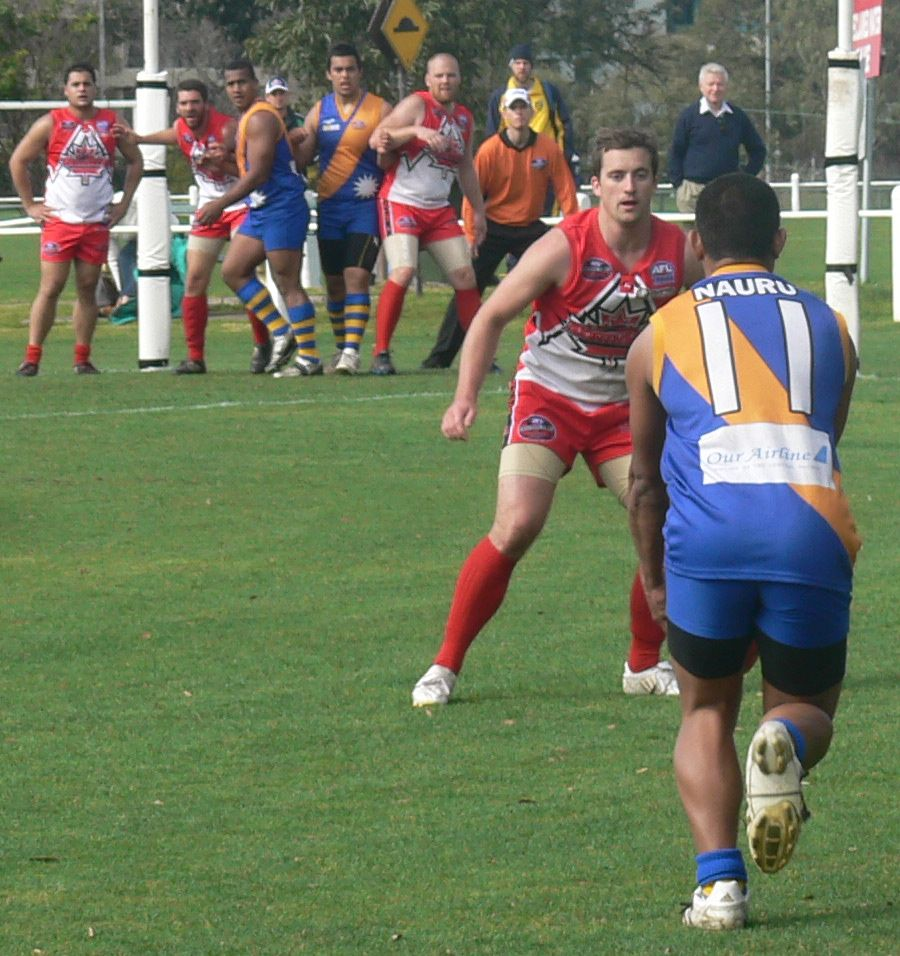
Nauruan takes a shot on goal

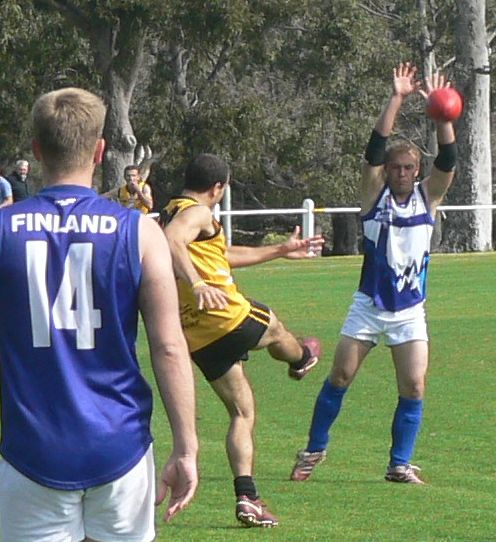
Peace team gets a kick away against Finland

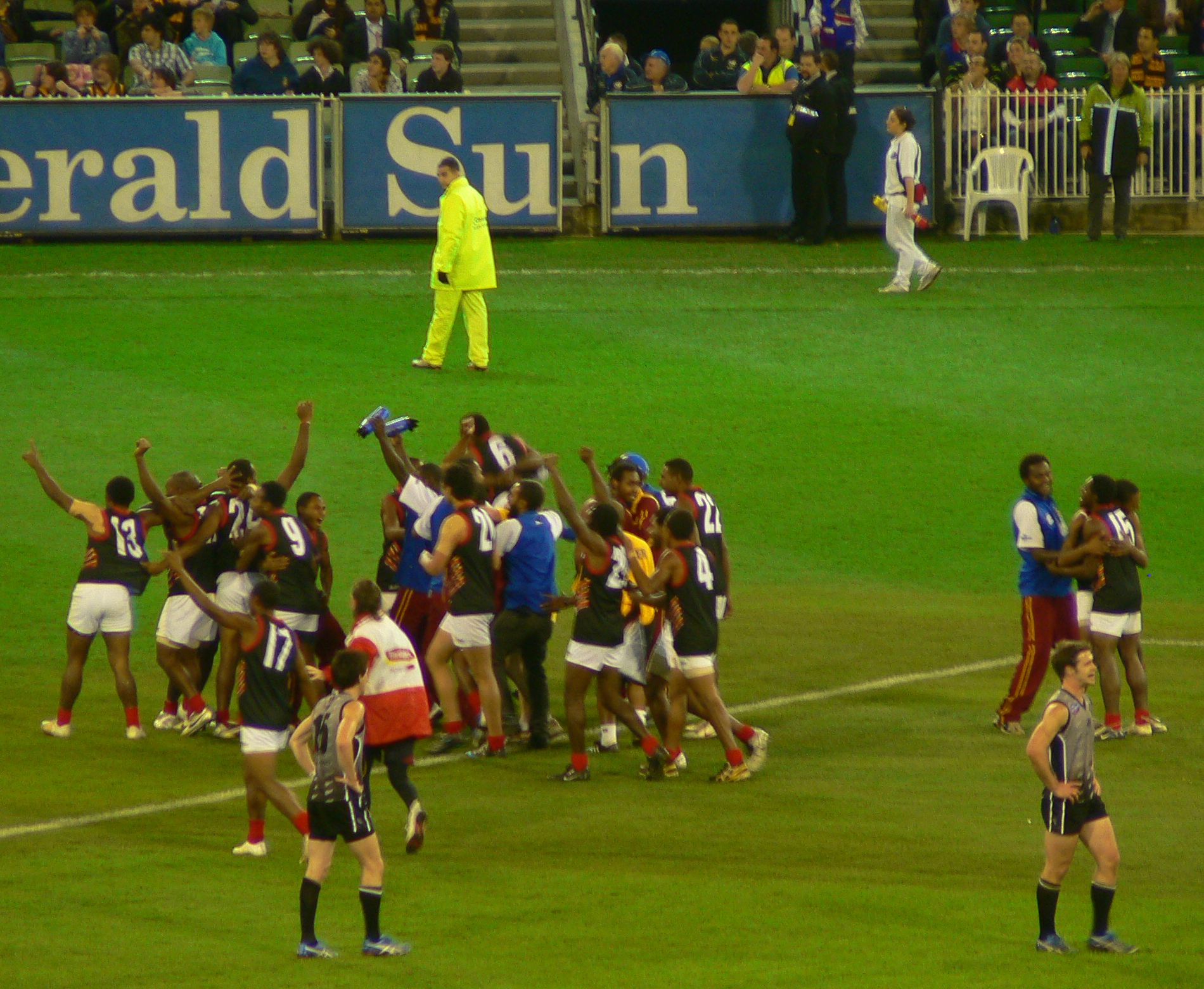
Papua New Guinea shortly after the final siren at the MCG

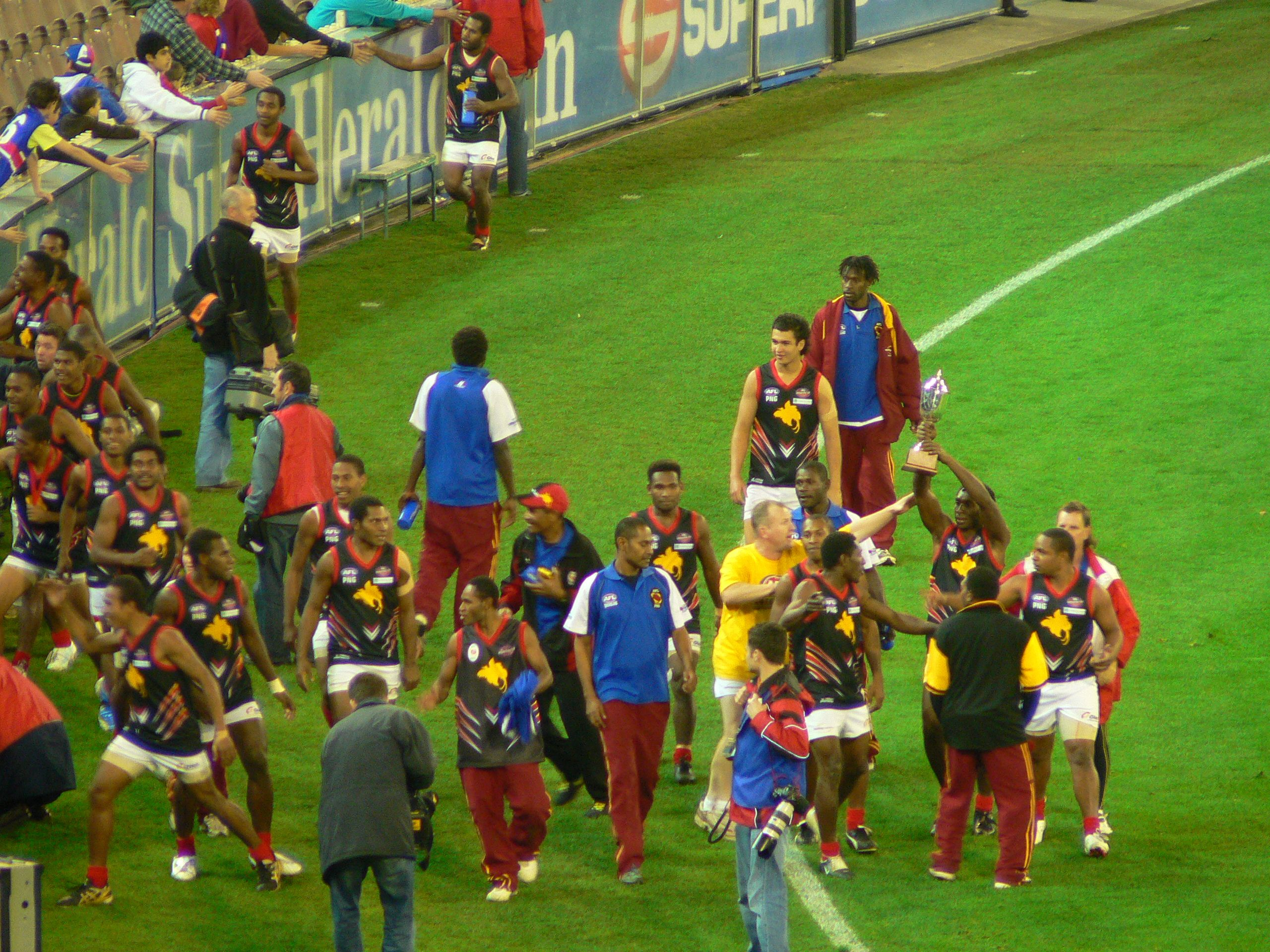
Papua New Guinea celebrates winning the cup

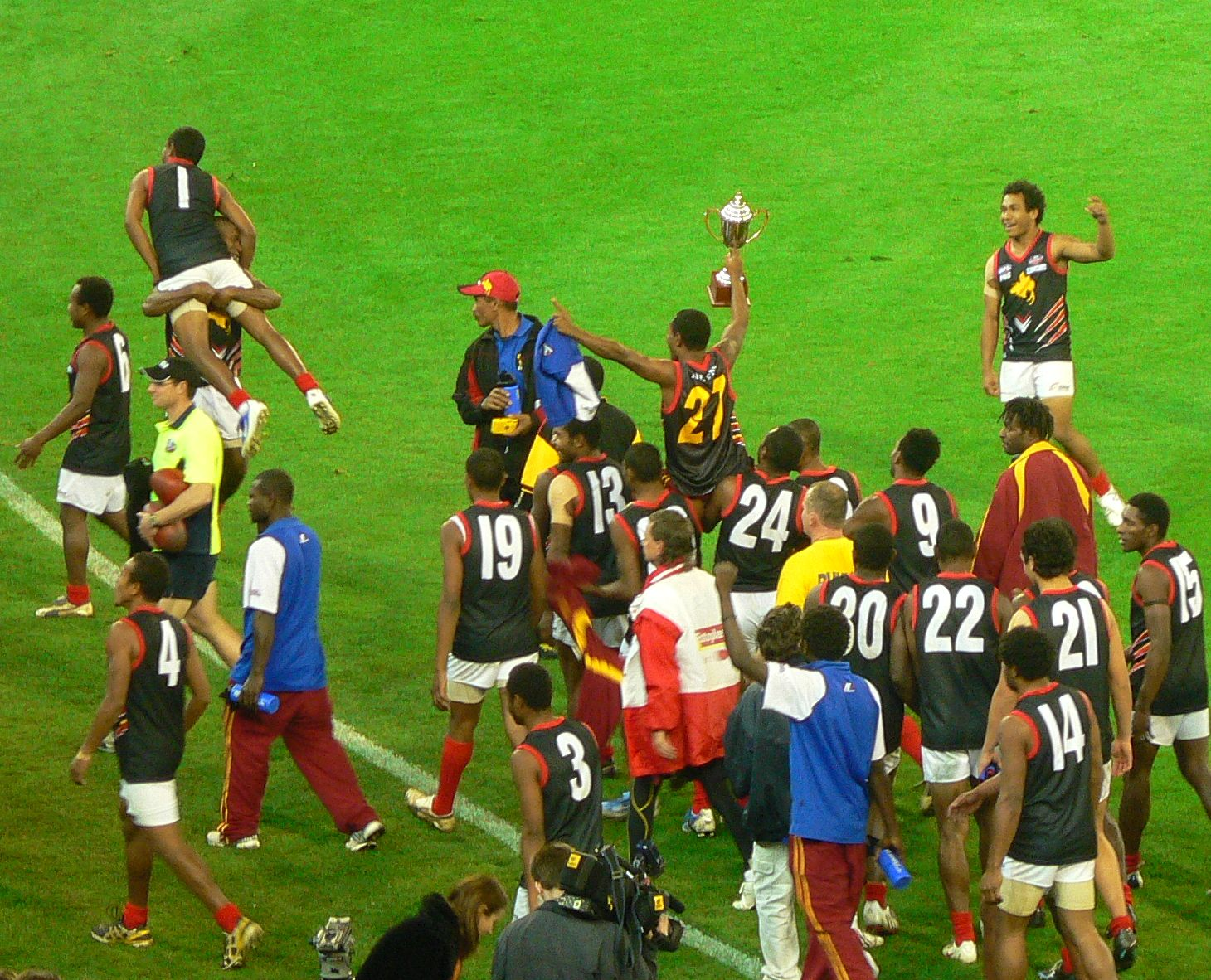
Papua New Guinea after a lap of honour

== See also ==
- Countries playing Australian rules football
- Geography of Australian rules football
- AFL Women's National Championship
