= Japan national Australian rules football team =

National sports team

Japan
- Nickname(s): The Samurai
- Governing body: AFL Japan

Rankings
- Current: 16th (as of October 2022)

First international
- Papua New Guinea 125 – 6 Japan (1999)

International Cup
- Appearances: 6 (first in 2002)
- Best result: 8th (2008)

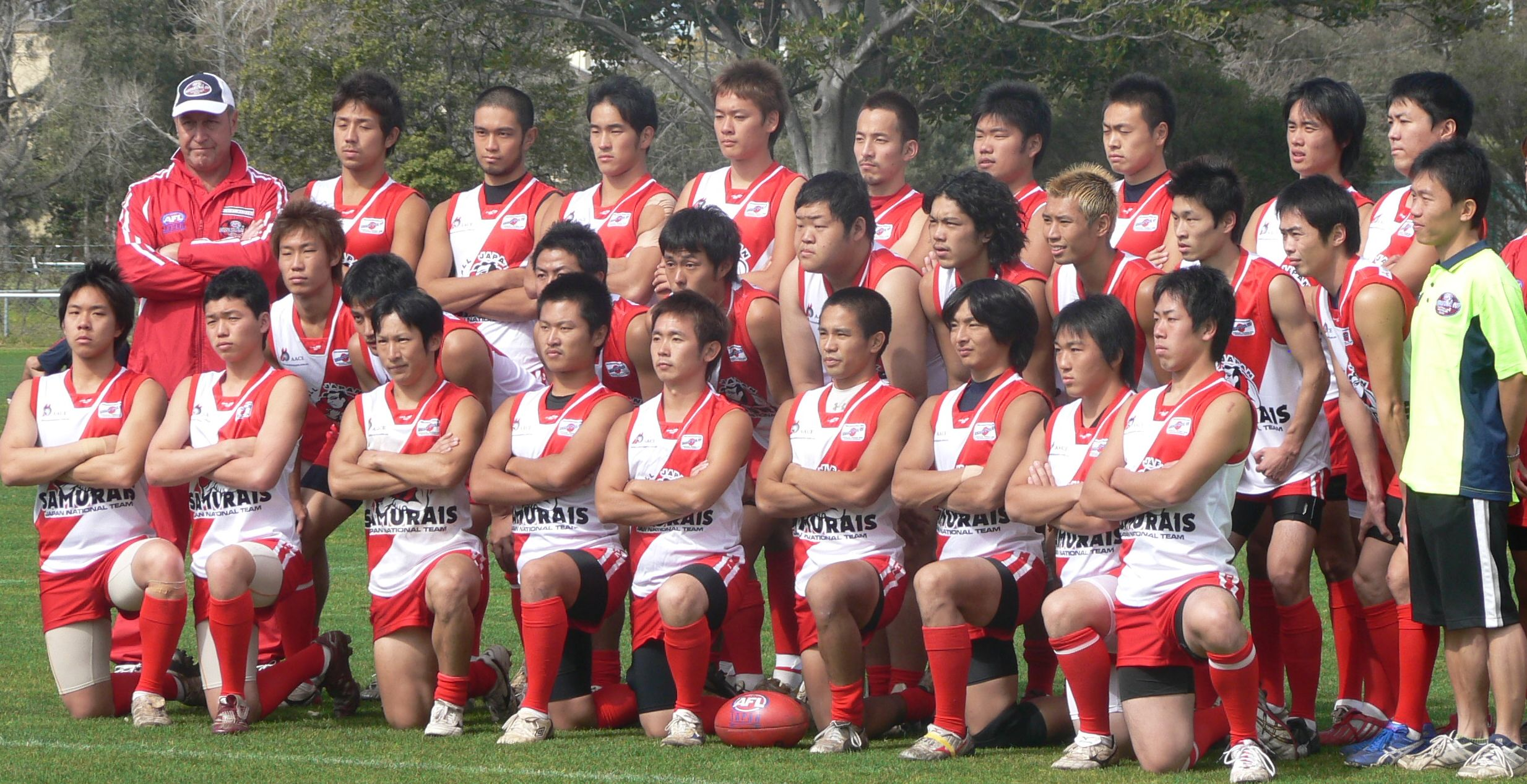
Japan's national team at the 2008 International Cup

The Japanese national Australian rules football team, nicknamed the Samurai (Japanese: 侍, romanized: Samurai), represent Japan in Australian rules football. The team represents the best Japanese-born players and is selected by AFL Japan from domestic competitions which have been running since 1987.

== Identity ==
Since its inception, the team has been nicknamed the Samurai. The team wears the national colours of Japan: red, white and also black; however there has been several design variations in the team's jumper, including a clash strip used when playing teams like Canada. For the 2005 International Cup, the side wore the colours in a vertical pattern (similar to the St Kilda Football Club in the Australian Football League) with the official Samurais' logo featuring a caricature of a samurai warrior. In 2006, the design featured a predominantly black stripe with white stars and red trim. For the 2008 International Cup, the team reverted to a predominantly white strip with a red sash.

== History ==
The Samurais' first international opposition was in 1995 when the team competed in the Arafura Games. They have since competed in the games in 1997, 1999 and 2001.

In 2001, Troy Beard became coach of the Samurais. Japan's Samurais competed in the inaugural Australian Football International Cup in 2002 finishing in 10th place. The year 2004 saw a vastly improved Samurai touring Australia and Singapore, playing six matches and winning four. One of these games was again against New Zealand, but this time an Auckland club rather than the national team, which Japan lost by just two points.

In 2005, the Samurai took home the Silver medal in the Arafura Games. Later that year, the team again competed in the International Cup, lifting its international ranking to 9th and included its first International Cup win, by 71 points against Spain. Richard Laidler, who had been Troy Beard's assistant for four years previously took on the senior coaching position in 2006 and the Samurai again toured Australia with a young squad playing 4 games finishing with a 2-point win against Box Hill North Football Club, but losses to the Howlong Football Club, Box Hill North Superules and Melbourne Vietnam Australian Football Club.

In 2007, the Samurai toured Australia, finishing 6–9 (45) in its game against the newly formed Melbourne based Vietnamese side, the Elgar Park Dragons 13–7 (85). Against Box Hill they registered a 30-point win. In the lead-up to the 2008 International Cup, Japan once again competed against its sister club Box Hill, this time easily accounting for its Australian rivals, winning by 56 points. This increased expectations for the Japanese side. During the cup, they had a breakthrough win against Samoa, following it with a thrashing of India which helped them to climb to 8th in the overall tournament ranking.

== Notable players ==
Michito Sakaki, current captain of the Samurai, has trained with the Essendon Football Club and played semi-professionally in Australia has been All-International in both 2005 and 2008. Teammate Tsuyoshi Kase also trained with Essendon and has played amateur football in Australia.

== International competition ==
=== International Cup ===
Australian Football International Cup

- 2002: 10th
- 2005: 9th
- 2008: 8th
- 2011: 12th
- 2014: 13th

=== Arafura Games ===
- 1995: 4th (as Japan/ Singapore)
- 1997: 6th
- 1999: Qualifying rounds
- 2001: 4th
