= Australian rules football in South Africa =

- Country: South Africa
- Governing body: AFL South Africa
- National team: South Africa
- Nickname: Lions (formerly Buffaloes)
- First played: 1896, Durban and Johannesburg
- Registered players: 32,000 (total); 2,000 (adult)
- Clubs: 138

Club competitions
- South African Australian Football League; North West Province Australian Football League; Gauteng Province Australian Football League

Audience records
- Single match: 10,123 (1998). Brisbane v. Fremantle. (Cape Town)

Australian rules football in South Africa is a team sport played at amateur level in the country with a small audience. The governing body is AFL South Africa.

Earliest recollections in South Africa indicate that Australian rules football was first introduced to the colonies of Transvaal, Natal and Cape in the 1880s with a premiership competition and intercolonial matches operating from 1896. By 1904, it had become one of the most popular codes of football in those colonies, however it soon faded with the success of the 1906–07 South Africa rugby union tour of Europe and with a lack of support from Australia, the game died out just prior to the Union of South Africa.

Since 1997, the sport has grown quickly amongst indigenous communities, beginning in the North West province and later spreading to Gauteng, KwaZulu-Natal and Western Cape province through the Australian Defence Force and later through dedicated development officers. In 2006, the game received a boost when the Australian Football League, seeking access to international sports funding from the Australian Institute of Sport began to show increased interest in the game's development.

South Africa's national team, the Lions, made history in 2007 by competing against the AFL Academy annually (until the AFL shifted its focus from South Africa in 2011), as well as defeating a touring Australian amateur senior team for the first time. The Lions reached a peak of bronze at the 2008 Australian Football International Cup however its performance, like the state of the game in South Africa, collapsed in the 2010s.

The junior variant, similar to Auskick, is locally known as "FootyWild" and was played in 92 primary schools and 46 high schools.

== History ==
The AFL Commission's official 2008 account of the game's history in South Africa was that it was played in 1898 "by a few Australian soldiers on Boer War service behind the lines". The AFL's mythological perspective appears to be primarily influenced by the presence of the league's own players including Stanley Reid (of Fitzroy) and Charlie Moore (of Essendon) who were among the earliest league players to die in active service. Several other league players also served including three Collingwood Football Club players and the club's song "Good Old Collingwood Forever" likely has its origins from this war. The VFL (which itself began in 1897), was aware of exhibition matches by soldiers through its war service players, though these matches generated very little interest among locals as the game was already being played there. While details of the game's origins in South Africa are not clear, there is much evidence pointing to interest in the game significantly predating and succeeding any involvement by Australia's premier league.

=== Origins and first clubs: 1886-1896 ===
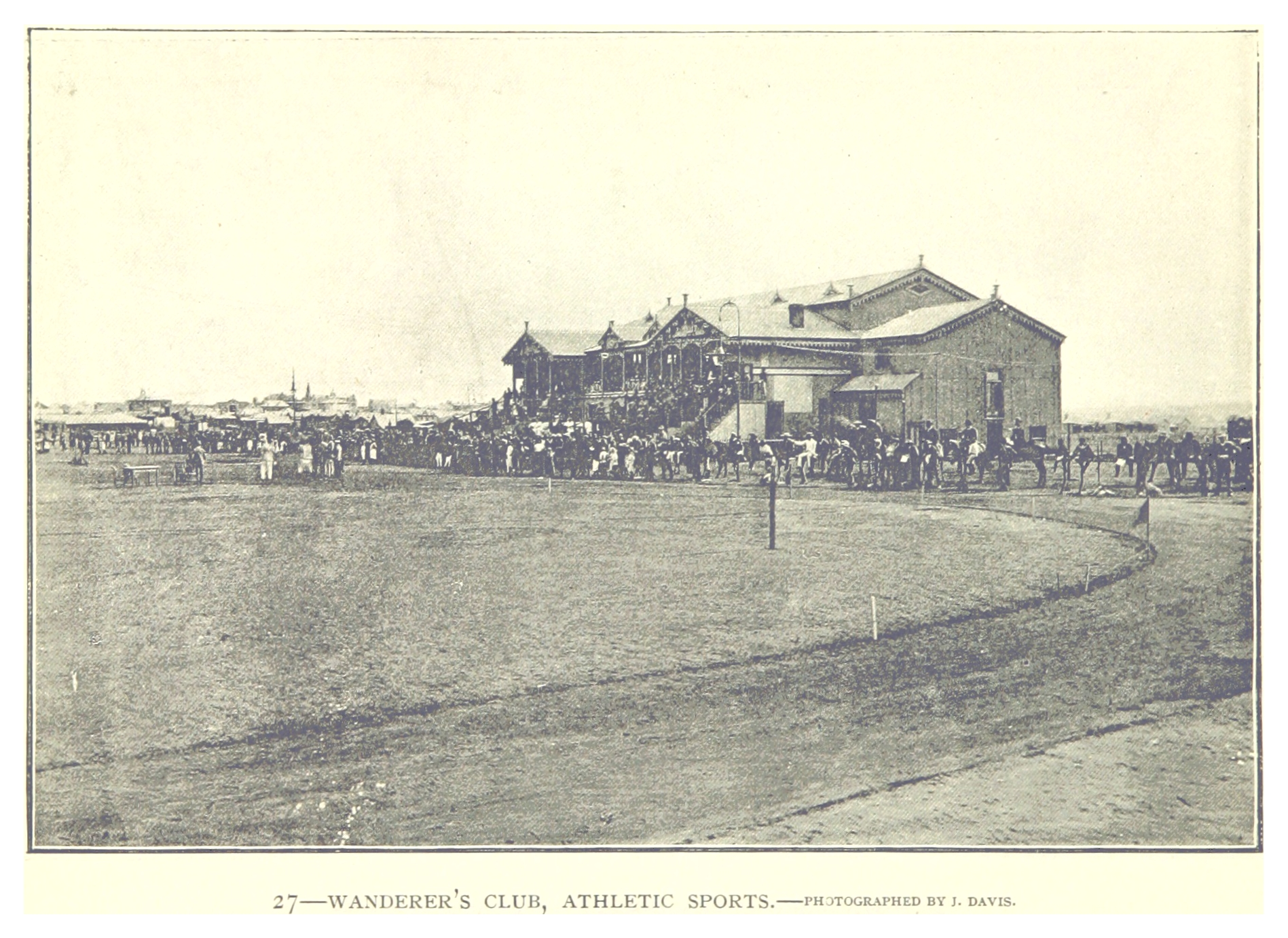
Old Wanderers, home of the first Australian Football clubs in Johannesburg in the 1890s

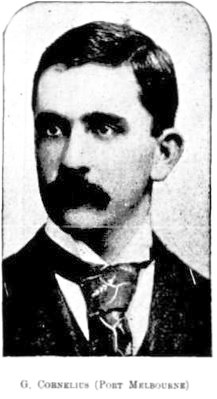
George Cornelius of the VFA, in 1895, the following year he made a shock move to become a founder of organised Australian Football in Durban

The Witwatersrand Gold Rush brought an influx Australians to Johannesburg in 1886, and there were a large number of migrants across the goldfields of South Africa. A 1904 recollection of the Australian game in South Africa cites a book called "Martin's Australian Football Guide" that claims that on the goldfields early footballers of various nationalities would alternate between soccer, rugby and Australian rules, and this happened prior to the outbreak of the war, with Australians beating the other nationalities at their own games contributing to the impression that the Australian game was the more skillful of the codes.

The Wanderers Football Club based at Old Wanderers in Johannesburg was formed by Australian Association cricket members as an off-shoot in December 1896. Melbourne's Argus newspaper makes reference of serviceman Frank E. Cochran of Elsternwick who served in the German West African campaign as one of the founding figures of the code in Johannesburg. Among the early instigators of the game in Durban was George Cornelius in 1896 who left as Port Melbourne Football Club's youngest ever captain at age 20 and began organising and captaining matches there.

=== Rise of the game, Boer War and the Elliot Shield (1897-1905) ===
The Second Boer War saw an influx of soldiers from around the world, including a significant number from Australia which boosted the game significantly and allowed it to take root.

1898 appears to have been the first year of regular annual competition between clubs in Transvaal with teams competing for the Elliot shield donated by Mr. E. Elliot.

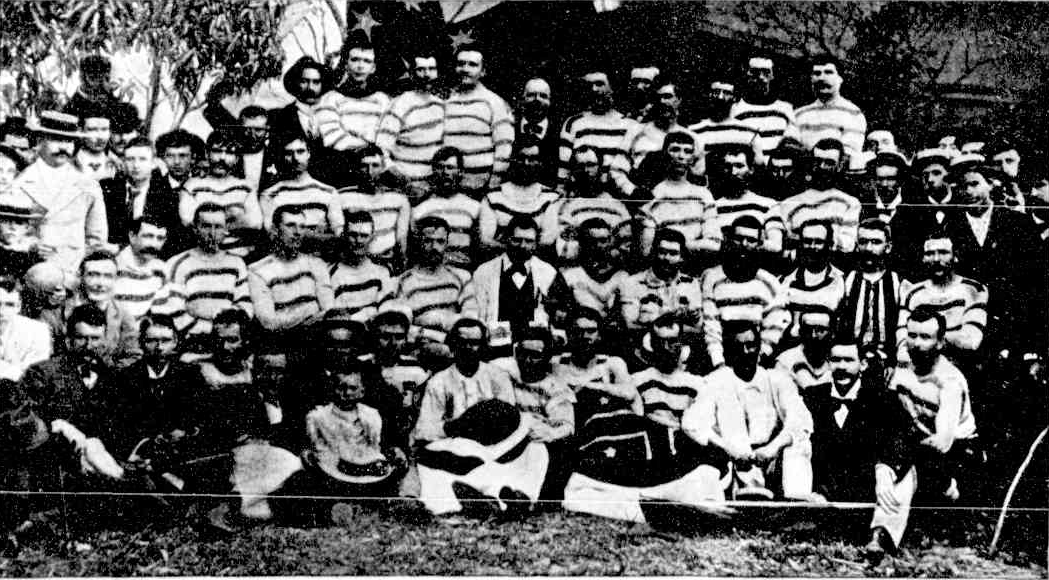
Australian Football teams in Durban, Natal 1900

The Durban Football Club appears to have been incorporated prior to 1900 but well established in 1900 though few records exist and there is no mention of a local competition in the city.

In 1900 a match was played at the Albert Park Oval in Durban between Victorians and South Australians which South Australia won by 2 points.

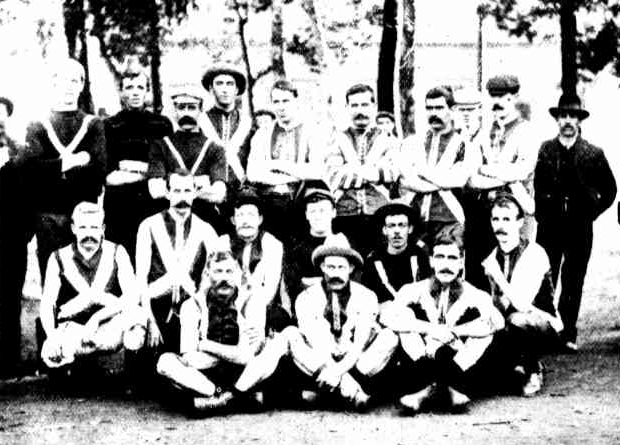
Pretoria Football Club in 1903

Records of the Johannesburg Football Club and the Pretoria Football Club date back to at least 1903. Pretoria was formed by Jack and Andy Campbell who had played football with the Maffra Football Club in Maffra, Victoria.

In June 1903 Johannesburg 3.14 defeated Pretoria 3.5 in front of a large crowd, with the local paper reporting "never was a more skilful, fast, and sterling exposition of the true Australian game exhibited In the annals of Australian football in this country, and if only both these clubs continue to give the public such genuine entertainment as was provided by Saturday's game, I venture to say that the time is not far off when many other local teams will adopt the Australian game. The openness of the play witnessed on Saturday, and the skilful manoeuvring of the several individual players roused the onlookers to the highest pitch of enthusiasm, and even the few Englishmen, Afrikanders and Dutchmen present, were unanimous in the verdict that never before had they witnessed such a fast, determined and skilful game in South Africa". The match was intended to be annual.

Also during the 1903 season, on October 17 Johannesburg defeated Durban 107 to 21 at Wanderers Ground. The Johannesburg Football Club is noted to have won the Australian Football League competition that year. Johannesburg's winning shield was sent to Australia and displayed in George Street, Sydney.

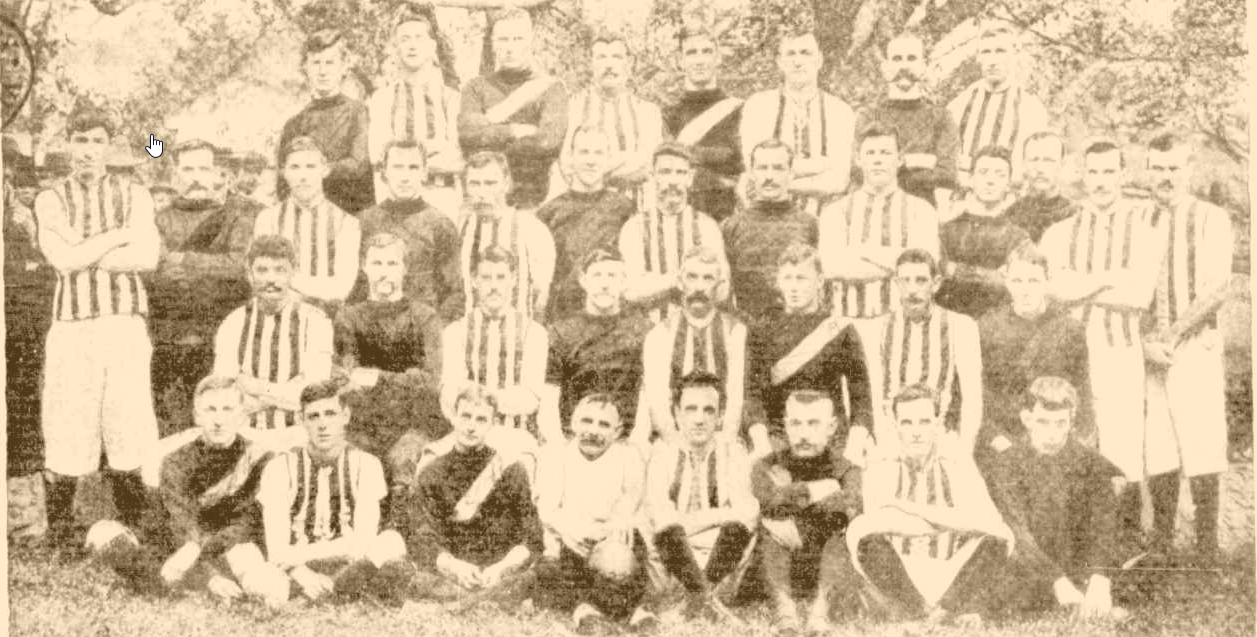
Natal and Transvaal's representative teams photographed in Durban, Natal for a match on 20 August 1904

The Commonwealth Football Club, captained by ex-Fitzroy Football Club player Charlie Naismith won the South African premiership in 1904 and the South Africa's Premiership Cup was displayed in Sydney and Melbourne leading to some awareness of the league in South Africa and the league had laid out the challenge to leagues in Australia and proposed a tour.

The Transvaal Australian Football League in 1904 had 4 clubs in and around Johannesburg: Commonwealth Football Club; Central South African Railways Football Club ( also known as "CSAR" or "Railways"); Pretoria Football Club, and; Germiston Football Clubs each playing nine matches a season. In 1904, W. Warner of the Commonwealth Club wrote to Thomas W. Sherrin that public opinion was that following the Pretoria match it had become the most popular football code in the colony and was being played with a Sherrin ball on much harder cricket grounds than Australia. Australian Football clubs were widely spread and had been formed in Germiston, Johannesburg, Pretoria, Durban, and Standerton. Among the prominent Australian players were: Charlie Foletta (East Fremantle: WAFL); Charlie Naismith (Fitzroy: VFL); Cecil Graeme (St Kilda: VFL); Alexander McKenzie (Port Adelaide: SANFL); W. Adair (Melbourne: VFA); Seary (Melbourne: VFA); Dowling (Melbourne: VFA) and Vincent O'Farrell (Geelong: VFA). It was noted that while the public had embraced the game, the majority of British nationals increasingly preferred to play the football codes which they were more familiar with.

Year & Winner
1903	Johannesburg
1904	Commonwealth
1905	Commonwealth

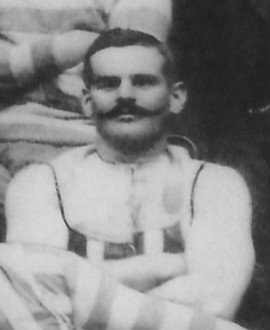
Charlie Folletta in 1893

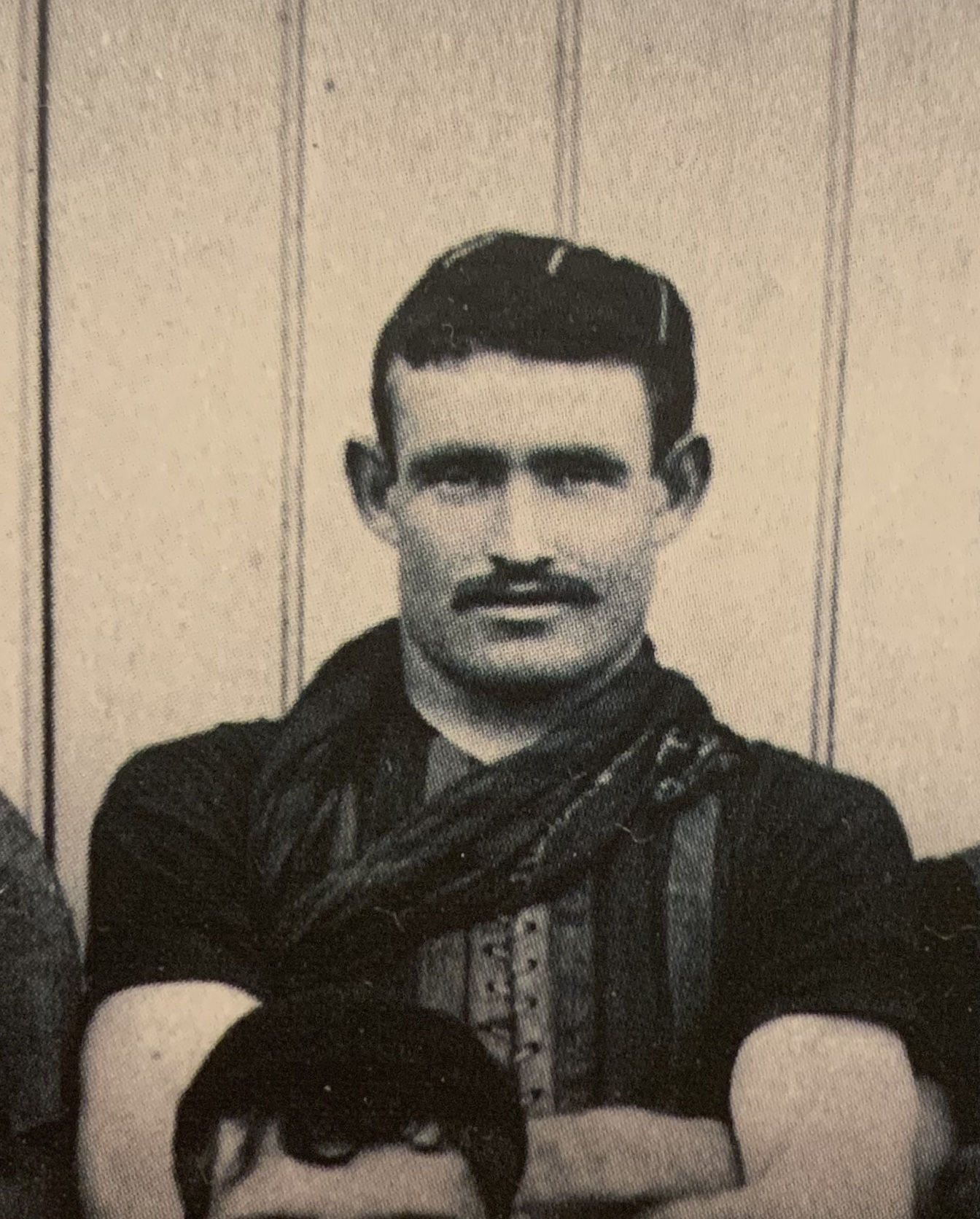
Alexander McKenzie in 1893

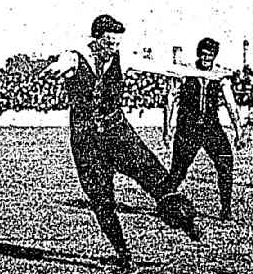
Charlie Naismith in 1905

Another league, the Cape Town Australian Football Association based in Cape Town also existed.

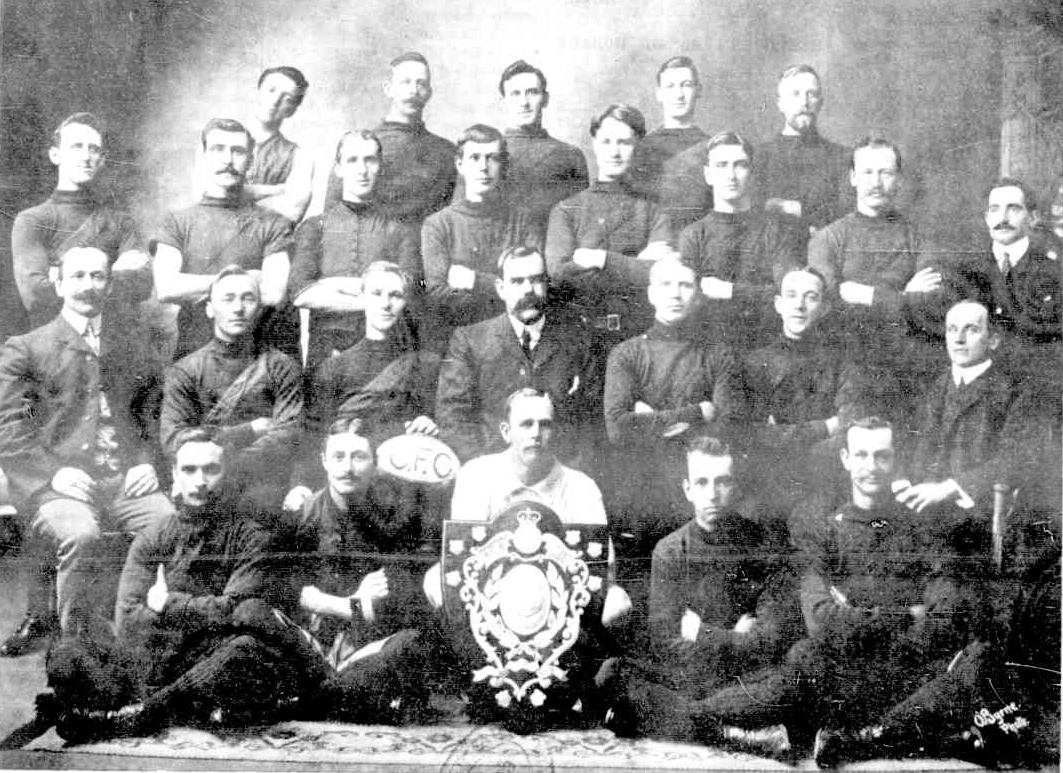
Commonwealth Football Club holding the Elliot Shield as Transvaal premiers in 1905. The trophy is now part of the Australian Sports Museum collection in Melbourne.

On 20 August 1904, a representative match held in Natal between the Colony of Natal and the Colony of Transvaal was played in front of a large crowd. The result was Natal by 22 points.

Officials in Melbourne were reporting that the game was established in South Africa by 1905. By mid-1906 there were reportedly as many as 30 clubs across the colony and the game was growing rapidly.

=== Australia declines support (1906-1909) ===
Between 1903 and 1905, the popularity of Rugby union in South Africa and Soccer in South Africa also began to rise rapidly. The sport's officials in the country, facing competition with two other football codes began to call for assistance from Australia to further grow the game. In 1904 delegates from South Africa sent a request to Australia for funding, proposing a major tour to Australia and New Zealand. However funds and interest in such a tour from Australia were not forthcoming. In 1906 delegates from the major leagues of Johannesburg, Pretoria and Durban made a direct request to the VFL to send a team to play a representative match in South Africa, which the Victorian league initially replied it would consider.

Following the request the game's newly formed governing body, the Australasian Football Council headed by the VFL met to discuss the issue and resolved that the game should only be played in Australasia and would not support it being played elsewhere. The Council's policy reflected the strong Australian nationalism of the time "one flag, one destiny, one football game" - that as the national code, all matches should be played under an Australian flag, with an Australian manufactured ball where possible on Australian soil, by the whole nation. The Council refused to sanction any matches under any other flag anywhere else in the world. It also refused to officially recognise the competitions in South Africa and the colonies were denied representation on the Council. The AFC replied that if South Africa wanted to play against Australia, it would have to send a team to Australia, Australia would not send any team or fund any matches. In 1907, then Australasian Football Council president Con Hickey declared that despite the game being played overseas the primary focus should be on inter-state competition and that there was no intention to attempt to "oust rugby" in places where it was growing in popularity.

The success of the 1906–07 South Africa rugby union tour of Europe substantially entrenched rugby's support in the colony and interest in Australian Football quickly waned. From 1907 an Australian exodus from South Africa occurred as wages fell and unemployment rose with many migrating to Western Australia.

Despite the Colony of New Zealand's representation at the 1908 Australasian carnival no match between Victoria and South Africa eventuated. Perhaps counting against South Africa was that the first and only other colony to be admitted the AFC, had already been admitted as a full voting AFC member in 1905 and even early on there was an active campaign by the Australian representatives to exclude it. South Africa had not yet at this time unified and still consisted of several fragmented colonies (without a strong governing body) whereas New Zealand was a unified colony in 1905 and a full Dominion by 1907 with a strong national governing body. Unlike New Zealand, the game in South Africa did not experience any major interference from rugby or soccer authorities as these games were also at this time only played at an amateur level and just beginning to take root, unlike New Zealand, which had a growing rugby league presence. Another factor was likely the absence of juniors, at this point New Zealand had a junior program which was the focus of much of the AFC's propaganda program there, likewise, initial developments in Canada and the United States that attracted funding from Australia involved juniors. In any case, the "Father of the game" in Australia H C A Harrison expressed some regret at the AFC's decision not to support the inclusion of South Africa during the 1908 Carnival.

Administrators of the game in Victoria had showed very little if any interest in promoting the sport there and this caused substantial frustration from the game's officials in South Africa already facing increasing competition with rugby and soccer for players.

M. C. Blackett reported that at the end of 1909 the code had gone into permanent recess as Australian Footballers joined the ranks of rugby and soccer due to a lack of numbers and interest to sustain the once thriving competition.

According to de Moore (2021), nothing is more to blame for the sport's demise in South Africa than from a "lack of systematic support from its heartland".

The AFL Record's 2007 "Footy Facts" column made an unreferenced claim that Australian football clubs existed in 1967 in Johannesburg, Pretoria and Cape Town and that the VFL at the time was optimistic about the future of the game in South Africa. There are, however, no other sources which back this claim up and it is likely that it was simply a misprint of "1907".

=== Revival attempts ===
In 1913 a match was played between crews of HMAS Australia and HMAS Sydney in Cape Town in front of a large enthusiastic crowd, Australia winning 104 to 53.

In 1917 two matches were held in Durban between players from Eastern Australia and Western Australia, both won by the West. The well promoted matches were observed with some interest from the locals.

However in 1920 Sydney rugby league commentators gloated that the Australian code was now all but dead in South Africa, while rugby (union), through strong assistance from Britain, was now thriving.

In 1939 a match played in Cape Town by the crew from HMS Moreton Bay attracted much interest and favourable reviews from the local newspapers.

In 1993 interest increased to the point where plans were made for powerful WAFL club Subiaco and Norwood from the SANFL to play two games in Johannesburg in 1994.

=== Development begins (1997-2001) ===
In 1997, the Australian Defence Force visited the North West province and the first talks of re-introducing the game began with some football clinics. The key benefits of the game were seen to be the apartheid racial issues which plagued the nation's national sport, rugby union and providing potential indigenous athletes with other choices a chance to possibly play a professional sport besides association football (soccer), which is popular amongst indigenous communities. Australian rules football being highly popular with indigenous Australian communities was seen as having potential cross-cultural links. South African children exposed to the clinics took up the sport enthusiastically and the rapid growth of the game began to attract serious attention in Australia.

In 1998 an experimental exhibition match was played between the Brisbane Lions and Fremantle Dockers Australian Football League clubs in Cape Town. The game attracted 10,123 spectators and media interest. Following the match, the South African government declared Australian rules football the sport for "the new South Africa". Later that year an under 16 South African team competed in inaugural Jim Stynes Cup in Canberra. In the same year the Adelaide Crows conducted coaching clinics in South Africa. In 2000, talented South African born indigenous player Damian Cupido (who moved to Perth, Western Australia as a youngster) debuted for AFL club Brisbane Lions, stirring further Australian interest in the country as a source of potential talent. In 2001, the first AFL development officer was appointed.

=== International success (2002-2009) ===
In 2002, South Africa sent its first national team, the Buffaloes to the Australian Football International Cup held in Melbourne. The team was not successful, failing to win any games and being defeated by large margins. AFL South Africa was formed in 2003, as a development organisation and secured funding from the North West Academy of Sport, as well as Ausaid, Australian Volunteers International and Tattersalls. Brian Dixon became the inaugural chairperson, establishing a head office at 17 Kerk Str, Potchefstroom. With the success of the program, the Australian Football League began to contribute development funds in 2004, seeing the country as a potential source of playing talent. A greatly improved Buffaloes competed in the 2005 Australian Football International Cup. The team registered its first win at senior international level against Japan and also Spain, finishing 8th overall.

In 2005, the Australian Convicts toured South Africa. They defeated the Buffaloes, but the Buffaloes were competitive. South African born indigenous West Australian Football League player Paul "Gumby" Magambwa began entertaining crowds with spectacular skills.

In 2006, the AFL announced it would send an all-aboriginal juniors side (from the Clontarf Foundation's Clontarf Football Academy) headed by former Essendon star Michael Long and Sydney Swans star Adam Goodes to play three matches, including an international rules football match against local sides in South Africa. Although the Australian team won easily the AFL CEO Andrew Demetriou announced that he wanted to expand the International Rules Series to become a tri-series and include South Africa, believing that indigenous South Africans would prefer a game with a round ball. He also stated that he believed that a junior from South Africa will eventually play at the AFL level in around 5–10 years time.

With the GAA cancelling the International Rules Series in 2006, the AFL's funding from the Australian Sports Commission (ASC) and Australian Institute of Sport (conditional on international competition) was under threat, under pressure to find another opponent it sought to fill this gap with international competition and announced it would choose South Africa where the game was developing fastest outside Australia.

South Africa sent a side to the 2006 Barassi International Australian Football Youth Tournament, showing some improvement, but losing games to New Zealand, the ACT and Australian aboriginal side. South African born Luke van Rheenen was selected in the 2007 rookie draft by the St Kilda Football Club.

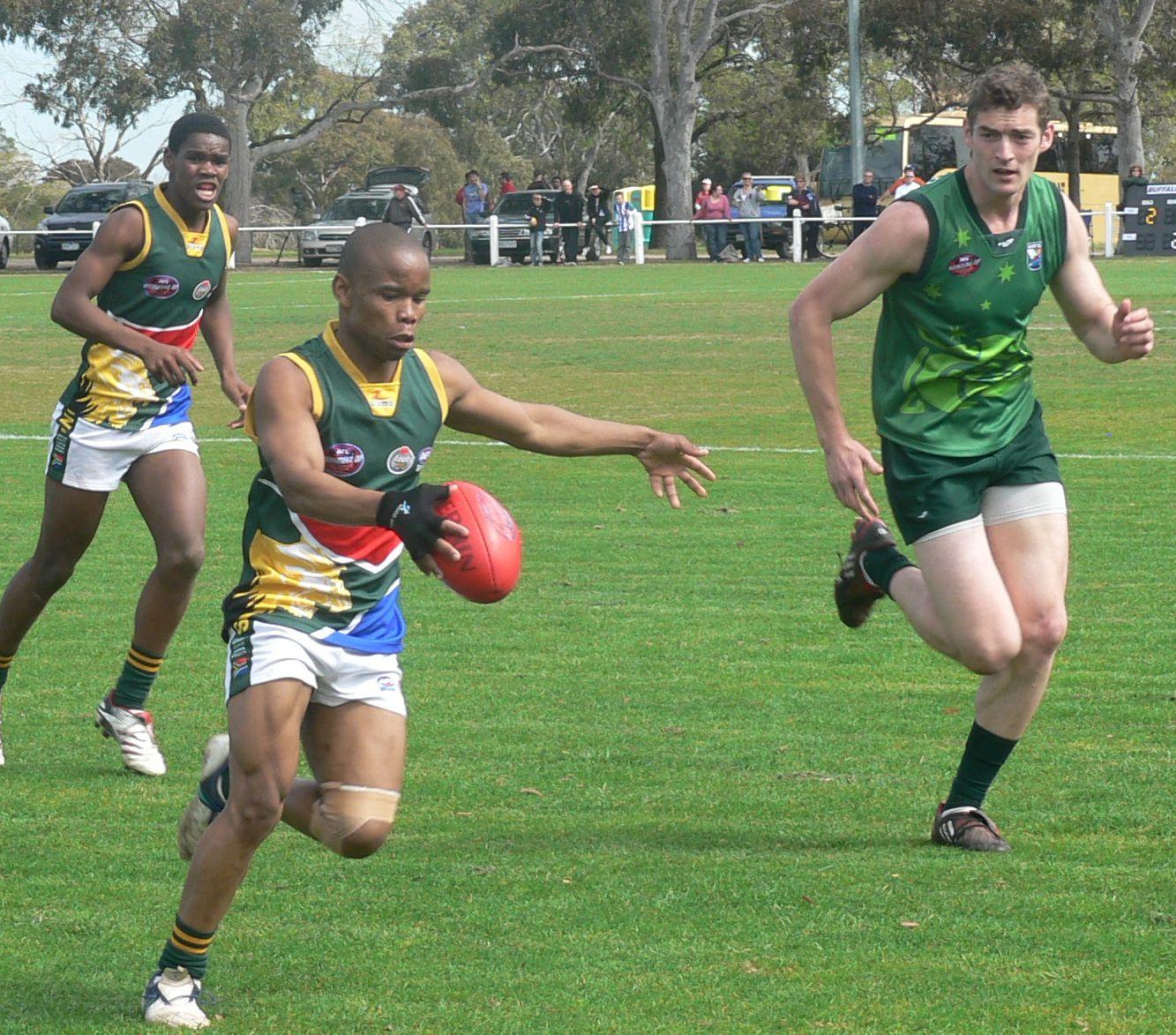
The Lions in action during the historic 2008 Australian Football International Cup final against Ireland which South Africa won by a point to take 3rd place overall

In February 2007, a youth side toured Australia, playing a curtain raiser to the Aboriginal All-Stars match in Darwin as well as games in Kakadu and Perth all against indigenous youth sides. In March, the Australian Convicts returned to play a series of matches, and were defeated for the first time by the South African Buffaloes.

In 2007, the AFL stepped up its funding, increasing it by 10 times from AUD$60,000 to AUD$600,000 resulting in the rebranding of Footy South Africa to AFL South Africa. Four partner AFL clubs each adopted a province: Fremantle (North West), Carlton (Gauteng), Collingwood (Western Cape) and West Coast Eagles (KwaZulu-Natal).

On 14 April 2007, Australia's AIS Under 17 squad competed against the South African national Australian rules football team at North West Cricket Stadium in Potchefstroom, South Africa. In April 2007, a large scale junior program, similar to Auskick called "Footy Wild" was launched and Frank Costa backed a large sponsorship deal for South African footy. The Geelong College 1st XVIII football team (along with the netball team) toured South Africa in June/July Aussie Rules matches at junior level against each of the main provinces. Although winning convincingly, The Geelong College formed positive relationships with the players and the trip proved to be a great investment for AFL in South Africa.

As part of its investment, the AFL scheduled a 2008 pre-season match between Fremantle and Carlton at Supersport Park, Centurion which attracted a modest attendance of 5,222 spectators.

The South African Australian Football League was formed in October 2008. The league was started at the Douglas Murray Oval in Cape Town, South Africa, and is tightly contested between two teams. The original rules of the game have been modified by the SAAFL to suit the grounds available in South Africa.

In February 2008, the Flying Boomerangs again returned to South Africa on tour, this time attracting more local media interest. In the same month, the AFL announced that 4 of its clubs had applied for access to specific recruiting zones in South Africa and to provide investment and development support through clinics and end of season tours. The clubs include Collingwood (Western Cape), Fremantle (North West), Carlton and the West Coast Eagles. Between 4–8 July 2008, the historic first senior AFL South Africa National Championships were held at the Kopanelo Cricket Ground in Potchefstroom from which the 2008 Australian Football International Cup squad was selected. The Lions returned to the International Cup in 2008. Despite fielding a short team, the Lions were fast and skilful, and surprised their opponents with a 3rd placing overall taking some large scalps including its first wins over early tournament favourites the US and Ireland and losing only to the eventual tournament winners Papua New Guinea.

=== AFL withdraws support and Post-FIFA / COVID decline (2010-) ===
South Africa hosted the 2010 FIFA World Cup which significantly affected participation, resulting in the AFL reducing funding. The national team's ranking post 2010 slumped from its peak of 4th to 9th.

At the conclusion of its 10 year Australian Institute of Sport commitment the AFL abandoned the South African program of one sided international tests and instead sent a side on tour to Europe in 2011. The result was that the AIS withdrew its partnership to focus on Olympics recognised sports. The AFL Academy did not return to South Africa and the AFL shifted its focus to Australian rules football in New Zealand for international funding. Despite the collapse of senior competition, junior programs have continued to run.

An Under 15 All-Australian School Sport Australia schoolboys side toured in 2014 and 2016.

The AFL reported in 26,000 children participated in FootyWild programs in 2017 and 35,000 in 2018. The AFL has, however, since then not published any figures on children's participation.

St Mary's Sporting Club under 18s toured for the third time in 2018 playing a series of matches against local sides.

All competitions ceased in March 2020 due to the COVID-19 pandemic and AFL South Africa's operations were downscaled due to a massive funding cut from the AFL.

== The "SAAFL" ==
The South African Australian Football League was formed in October 2008. The league was started at the Douglas Murray Oval in Cape Town, South Africa, and is tightly contested between two teams. The original rules of the game have been modified by the SAAFL to suit the grounds available in South Africa.

The game is played in half a normal rugby field, measuring about 50m in length, and about 40m in width. There are only two goal posts at one end of the pitch, which can also be used to play rugby. The goals stand about 5 metres apart, and have a bar parallel to the ground about 3 metres high joining the two upright poles. 4 points are awarded if the ball is kicked from within the 22-metre "D" between the posts and over the horizontal bar, and 2 points are awarded if the ball goes under the horizontal bar. If the ball is kicked from outside the 22-metre "D" over the horizontal bar, 6 points are awarded. This is termed a "Mzanzi". The right to shoot at the goal is earned if a player marks the ball anywhere within the pitch, having caught the ball from one of their teammates kick. No umpires are present in the game, as although the game is tightly contested, the players respect the rules and enforce them accordingly themselves.

== National team ==
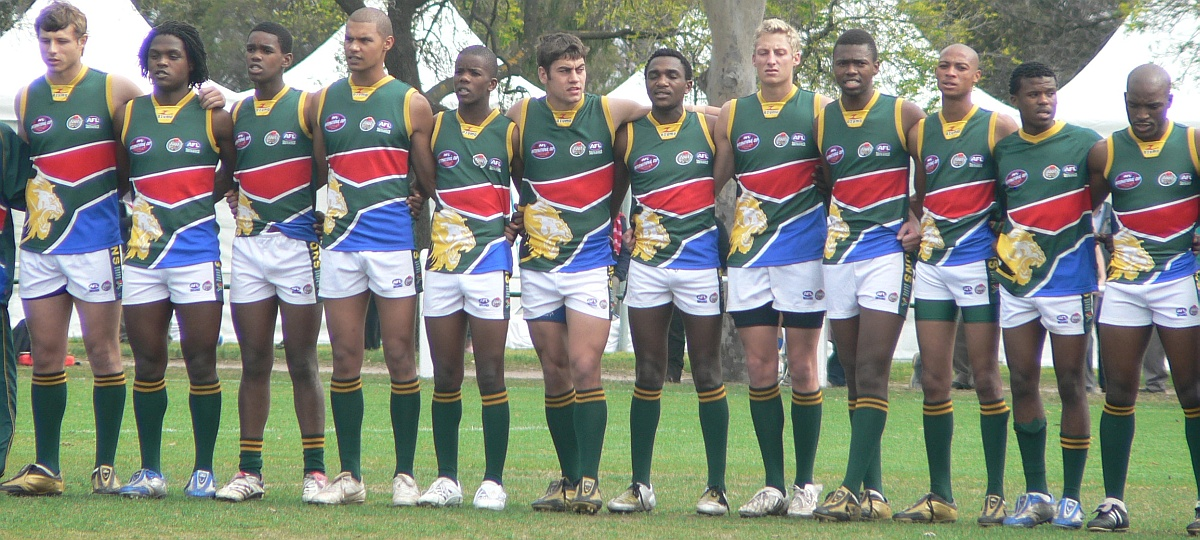
South Africa lining up for national anthem before a match against Ireland during the IC08

The Lions are South Africa's national team. Their best result was in the 2008 Australian Football International Cup when they finished 3rd overall behind Papua New Guinea and New Zealand.

== Participation ==
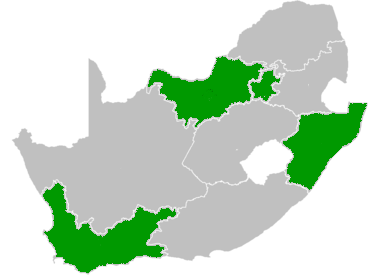
A map of South Africa highlighting in green the provinces in which development officers co-ordinated organised Australian rules football competitions in 2007.

The AFL reported in 2018 that 35,000 in children participated in FootyWild programs in 2018 (26,000 participated in 2017). The AFL has, however, since then not published any figures on children's participation.

The AFL had set a target in 2007 of 20,000 players in South Africa by 2009. In 2010 this target was reached and a new target of 40,000 was established.

By the end of 2007, the figures recorded a total of 7,800 participants including 3,000 senior players, 800 juniors and 4,000 Footy Wild (Auskick) participants. This represented a growth in participation of 160% between 2005 and 2007.

By the end of 2005, it was reported by the AFL that there were over 3,000 players in the country.

The game had grown from no players in 1997 to 160 senior and 540 junior players in South Africa in 2004.

== Notable players ==
=== Men's ===
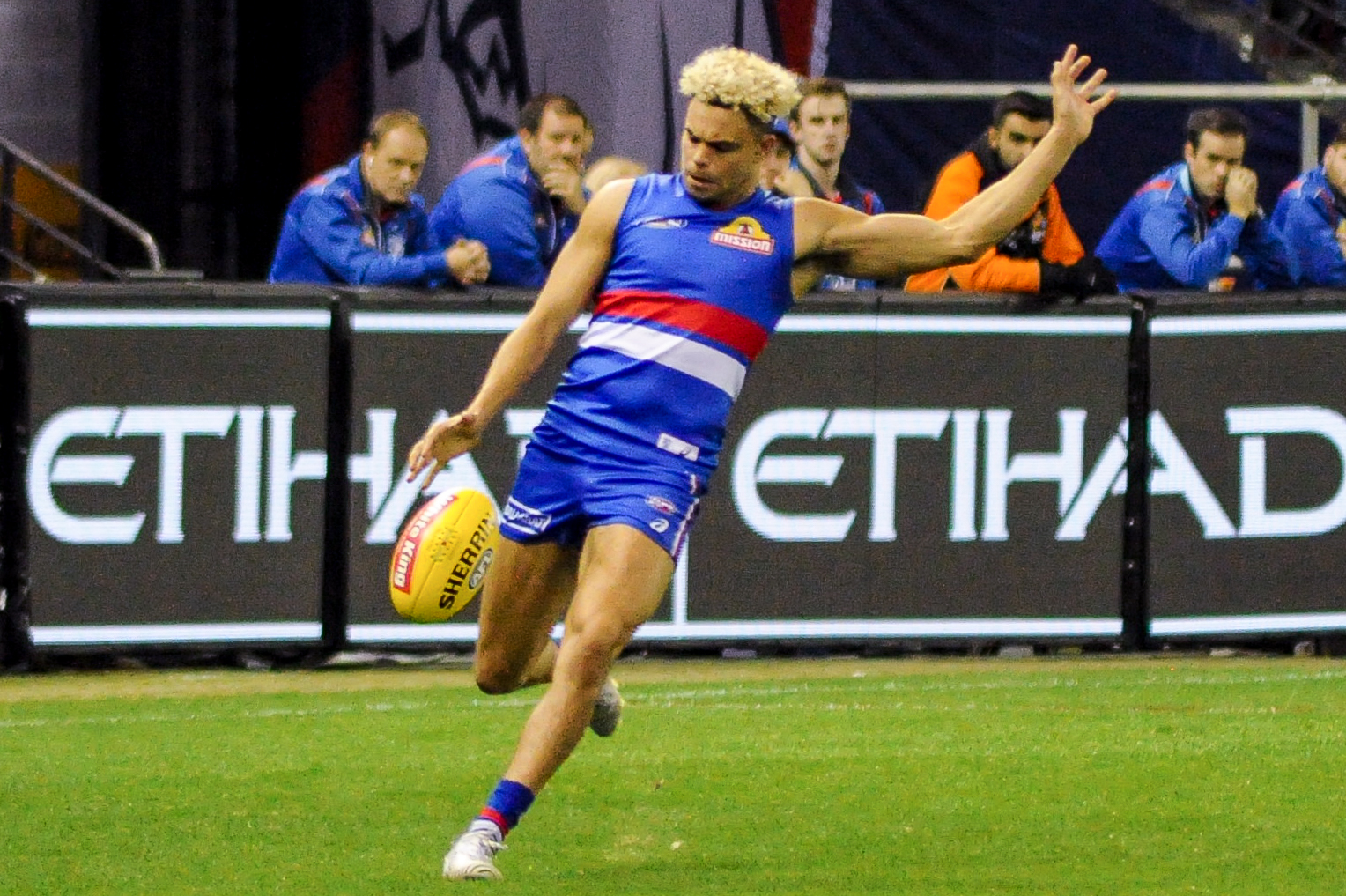
Jason Johannisen playing for the Western Bulldogs in 2017

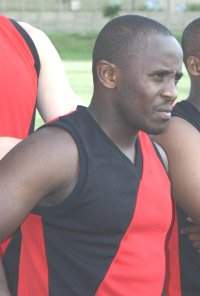
Mtutuzeli Hlomela captain of the South African national Australian rules football team (Buffaloes)

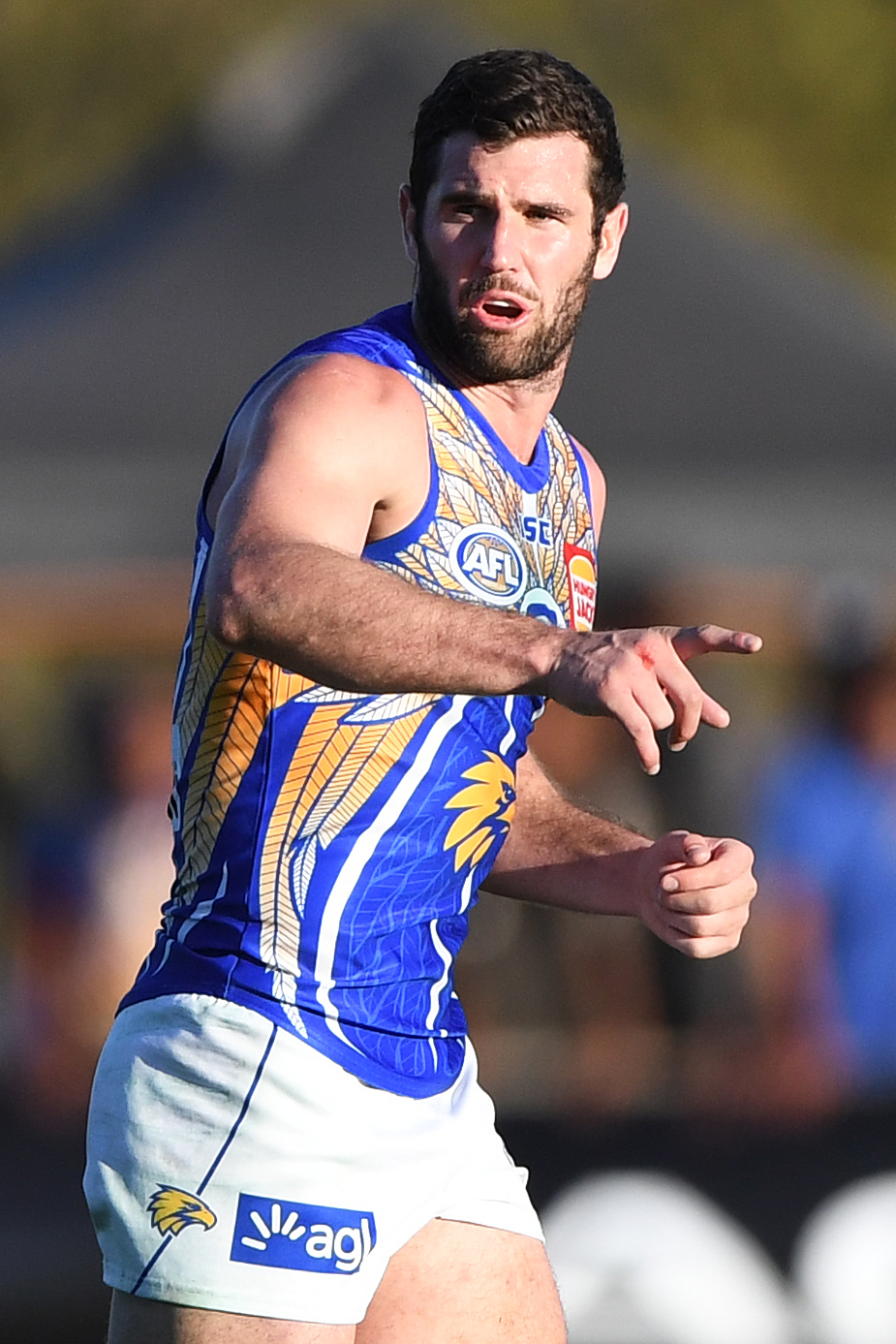
Jack Darling playing for West Coast in 2019

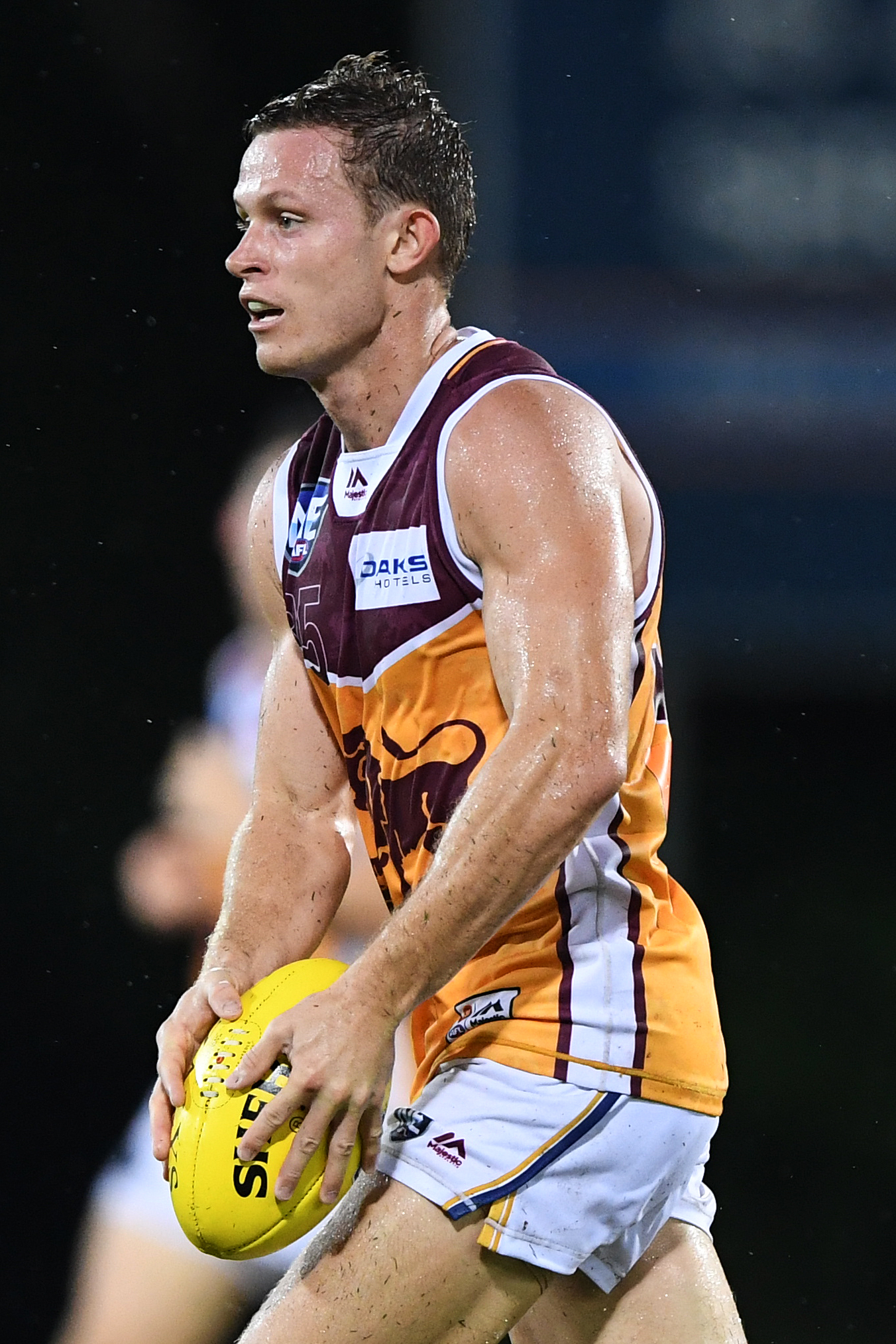
Ryan Lester playing for Brisbane in 2019

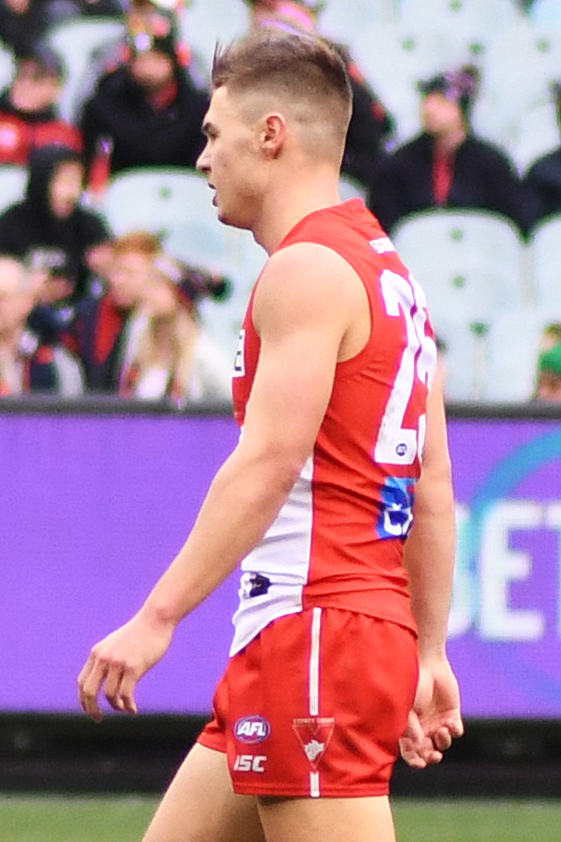
Ben Ronke playing for Sydney in 2018

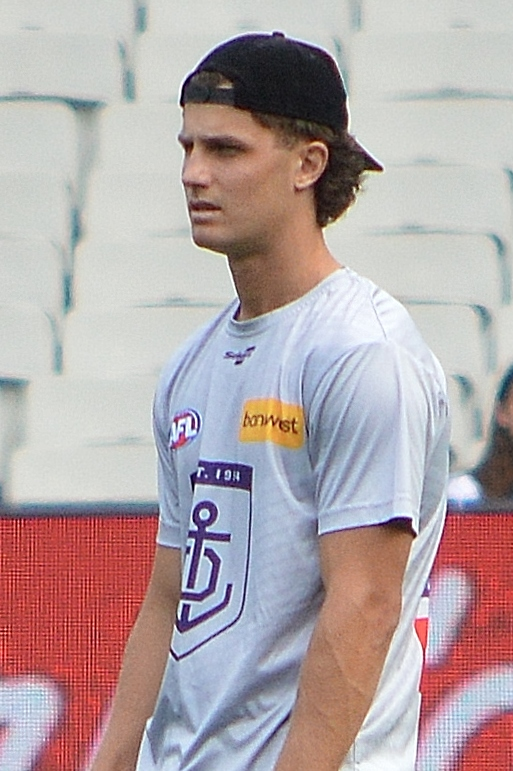
Neil Erasmus with Fremantle in 2025

Currently on an AFL senior list

Player	AFL Years*	AFL Matches*	AFL Goals	Connections to South Africa, References
Jake Rogers	2024-	-	-	Mother
Sam Clohesy	2024-	1	1	Mother
Cameron Mackenzie	2023-	14	3	Father
Ted Clohesy	2023-	1	-	Born, mother Geelong Category B Rookie
Neil Erasmus	2022-	19	2	Born Johannesburg. Pick #10 2021 AFL draft Fremantle Football Club
Ben Ronke	2018-	44	39	Mother
Jason Johannisen	2012-	187	75	Born Johannesburg, father Premiership player with the Western Bulldogs.
Eugene Kruger	2012	-		Born. Rookie listed by the Sydney Swans
Ryan Lester	2011-	179	47	Father
Jack Darling	2011-	277	510	Father
Bayanda Sobetwa	2007-2008	-		Born (13 March 1990) From Cape Town. First South African to be first AFL player recruited from South Africa. Listed with the Greater Western Sydney Giants. Represented South Africa at the 2008 International Cup and played in the WAFL under 18s for Swan Districts.
Luke van Rheenen	2007-2008	-		Born (07/03/1988) Rookie listed with the St Kilda Football Club
Damian Cupido	2000-2005	53		Born, parents
Tate Day	1998	-		Born. rookie listed by the Brisbane Lions.
Stephen Lawrence	1988-1998	146		Born, father played test cricket for South Africa
Ian Muller	1984-1991	27		Born
Jack Baggott	1927–1937	147	40	Born
Aubrey MacKenzie	1911–1924	37		Born Durban

- as of 2019 AFL season

=== Women's ===
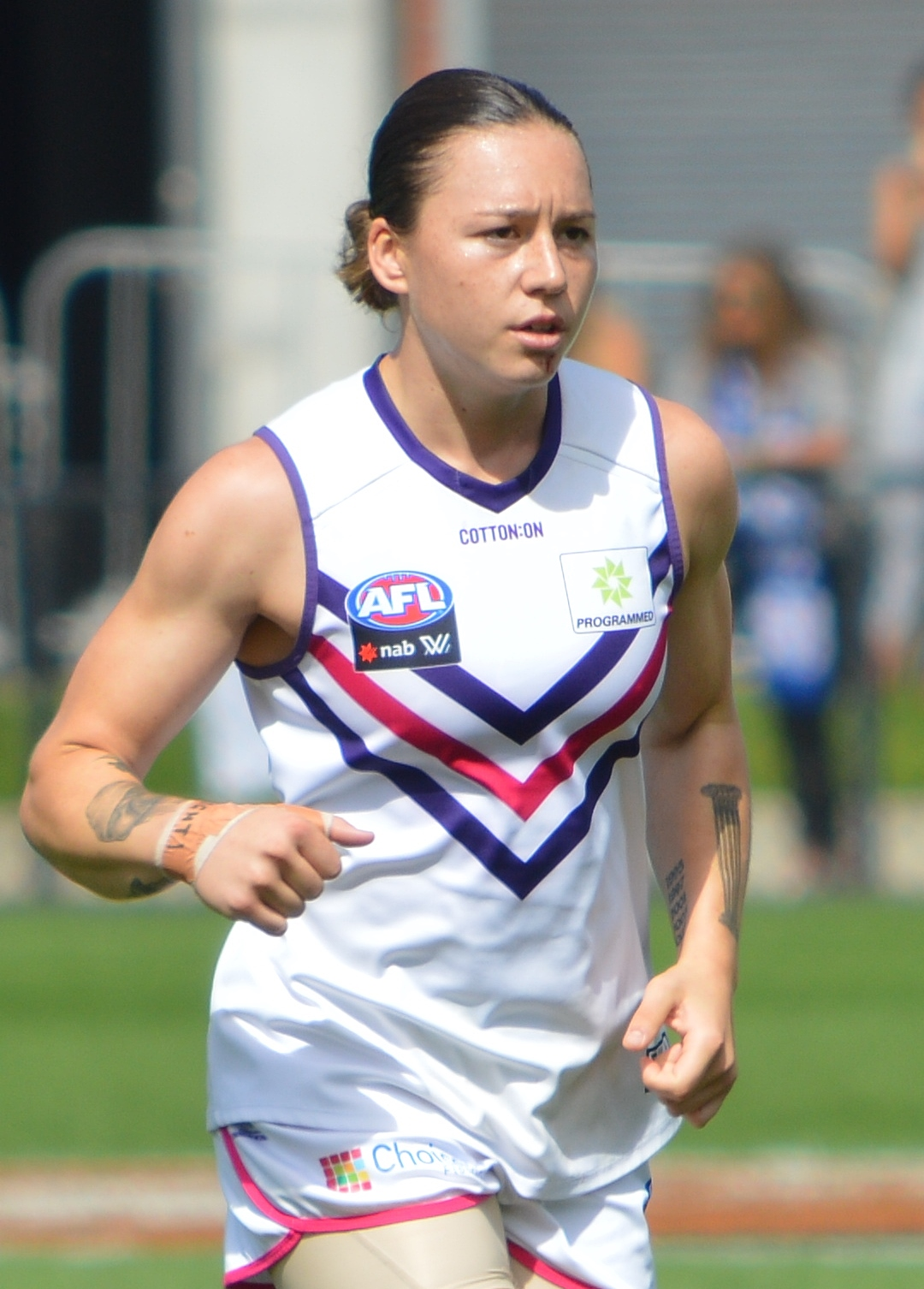
Roxanne Roux playing for Fremantle in 2021

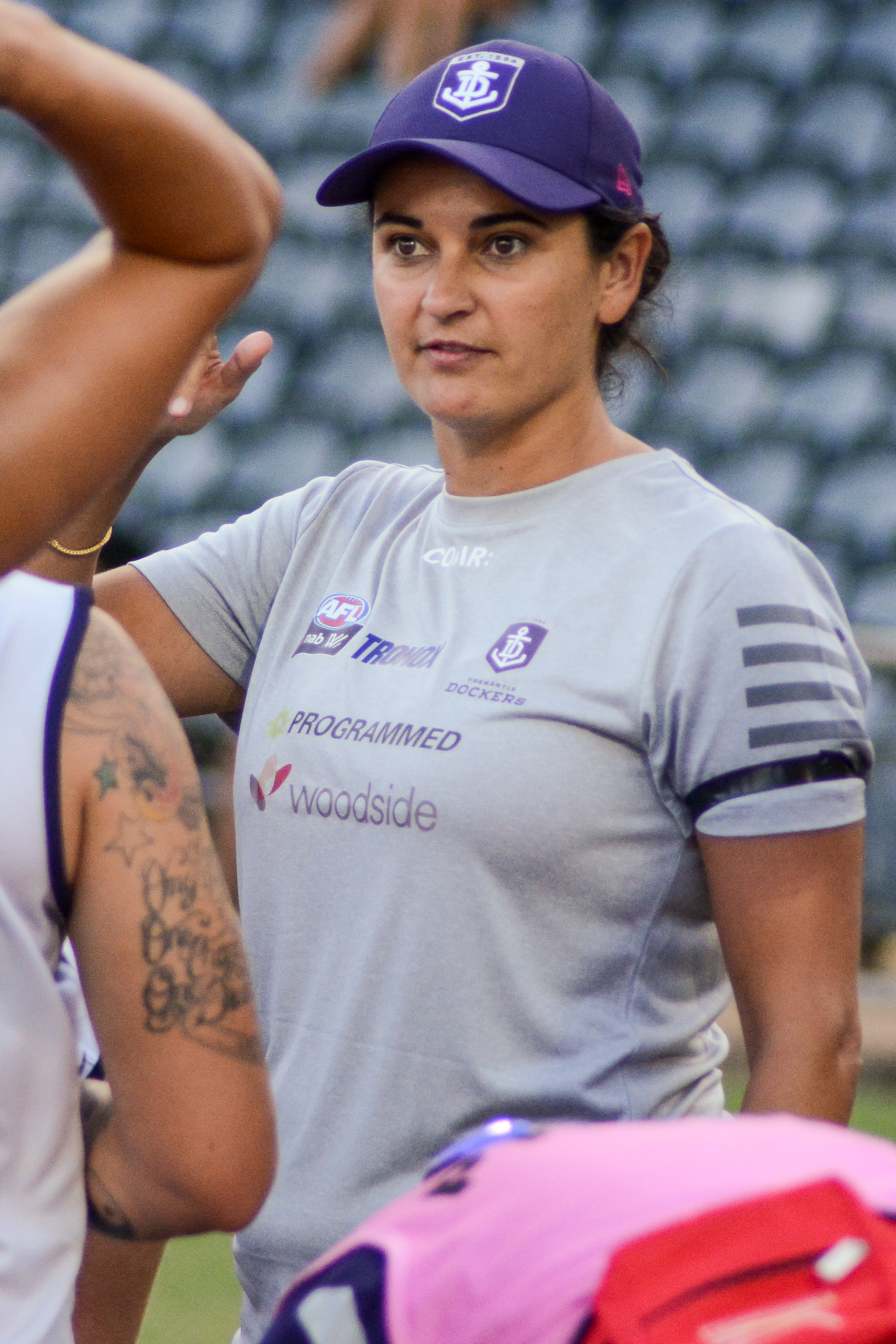
Michelle Cowan, as inaugural head coach of the Fremantle Football Club in the AFL Women's competition (AFLW) in 2017

Currently on an AFLW senior or rookie list

Player	AFLW Years*	AFLW Matches*	AFLW Goals	Club played/plays for	Connections to South Africa, References
Roxanne Roux	2020-	24	14	Fremantle	Parent

=== Other notable players ===
- Ziggy Alwan (SANFL) (23 November 1988) – South African born, season 2008 player for Norwood Football Club, recruited and returned to the Victorian Eastern Football League's Noble Park Football Club where he grew up. Runner up in the reserves Magarey Medal and Norwood Reserves Best and Fairest in 2008
- Mtutuzeli Hlomela (SANFL) – 167 cm soccer convert who played SANFL under 18s before captaining the South African national team in 2005 and 2008 International Cups and later national coach
- Paul Mugambwa (WAFL) – (30 May 1981) – South African born, recruited from Bullcreek Leeming, 2005–9 senior list player for South Fremantle Football Club. The 182 cm forward is known for his spectacular high leap and mark.
- Steven Malinga (07/05/1982) – South African national team vice-captain from Itsoseng who has played for Swan Districts in the WAFL reserves
- Steven Matshane (02/04/1988) – outstanding junior talent from Mafikeng who has represented South Africa at under 18 level against Australia's AIS and indigenous under 18 squads and has also played in the WAFL reserves. Also represented South Africa at the 2008 International Cup. Has a home made tattoo of an AFL ball on his arm.
- Thabiso Phakedi (25 February 1990) – player from Morokweng played in the WAFL under 18s for Swan Districts. Represented South Africa at the 2008 International Cup and was named in the World Team.
- Tshepiso Mogapi (28 February 1991) – player from Itsoseng who has played in the WAFL under 18s for Swan Districts. Represented South Africa at the 2008 International Cup.

== Leagues ==
- North West Province Australian Football League
- Gauteng Province Australian Football League

== Books ==
1. de Moore, Greg; Hess, Rob; Nicholson, Matthew; Stewart, Bob (2021). Australia's Game: The History of Australian Football. Hardie Grant Books. ISBN 9781-74379-657-3.
