= Countries playing Australian rules football =

List of countries with registered players of Australian rules football

Map of the world indicating the nations where Australian rules football was most played in 2009. The stronger regions are indicated in shades of red, areas in which it was most played; areas where the game was unknown or least played are indicated in grey.

Note: In order to be recognised as a true national team and not simply expatriates (for the purposes of this entry), the list is subject to International Cup eligibility rules.

Australian Football League has official affiliation agreements with 15 international governing bodies, ARFL Ireland, AFL Canada, Danish Australian Football League, AFL Scotland, AFL England, AFL Wales, AFL Japan, Nauru Australian Football Association, AFL New Zealand, USAFL, AFL South Africa, AFL PNG, AFL Samoa, Tonga Australian Football Association, AFL Germany and AFL Middle East, although it has working relations with leagues and clubs in further countries.

However, while these affiliations are in place, Australia is the only nation that actively engages in this sport at a professional level.

== Africa ==
Countries with established league(s) and non-Australian-based national team:

Country	Overview	National team	Major teams/clubs	Governing Body	Main league competition(s)	Main cup competition(s)	Best Men's International performance (tournament)	Best Women's International performance (tournament)
South Africa	Overview	Lions (formerly Buffaloes)		AFL South Africa	North West Province; Gauteng Province		3rd, (IC2008)	

Other nations with some history of Australian Rules:

Country	Overview	National team	Major teams/clubs	Governing Body	Main league competition(s)	Main cup competition(s)
Botswana	Overview	None	None	None	None	None
Ghana	Overview	None	None	None	None	None
Kenya	Overview	None	None	None	None	None
Senegal	Overview	None	None	None	None	None
Uganda	Overview	None	None	None	None	None
Western Sahara	Overview	None	None	None	None	None
Zimbabwe	Overview	None	None	None	None	None

== Americas ==
Countries with established league(s) and non-Australian-based national team:

Country	Overview	National team	Teams/clubs	Governing Body	Main league competition(s)	Main cup competition(s)	Best Men's International performance (tournament)	Best Women's International performance (tournament)
Canada	Overview	Northwind (men's), Northern Lights (women's)	40+	AFL Canada	OAFL; BCAFL; AFL Quebec; CWAFL	USAFL National Championships	6th (IC2008)	
United States	Overview	Revolution (men's), Freedom (women's)	50+	USAFL	MAAFL; EAFL; NWPAFL; SEAFL; WAFA	USAFL National Championships	3rd (IC2005)	
Colombia	Overview	Jaguares (men's), (women's)	Bogota Bulldogs	AFL Colombia				

Other countries with some history of Australian Rules:

Country	Overview	National team	Teams/clubs	Governing Body	Main league competition(s)	Main cup competition(s)
Argentina	Overview		Los Santos de Santiago	AAFAU		
Brazil	Overview		Carnaval			
Bermuda	Overview		Bermuda Lions			
Cayman Islands	Overview	None	None	None	None	None
Chile	Overview		Santiago Saints			

== Asia ==
Main articles: Australian rules football in Asia and Australian rules football in the Middle East

Countries with an established league(s) and non-Australian-based national team:

Country	Overview	National team	Major teams/clubs	Governing Body	Main league competition(s)	Main cup competition(s)	Best Men's International performance (tournament)	Best Women's International performance (tournament)
Japan	Overview	Samurais	Tokyo Goannas	AFL Japan	JAFL	Asian Championships; Narita Cup	8th (IC2008)	

Countries with at least one active club and/or national team including Australian players:

Country	Overview	National team	Major teams/clubs	Governing Body	Main league competition(s)	Main cup competition(s)	Best Men's International performance (tournament)	Best Women's International performance (tournament)
Brunei	Overview		Sharks	BARFL		Asian Championships		
China	Overview		Beijing Bombers; Shanghai Tigers; Tianjin Normal University			Asian Championships	15th, 2008	
Hong Kong	Overview		Dragons			Asian Championships		
India	Overview			AFL India			16th, 2008	
Indonesia	Overview		Jakarta Bintangs; Jakarta Bulldogs; Bali Geckos; Banda Aceh Bandits; Borneo Bears		WeJAFL	Asian Championships; Pancawati Cup; Java-Bali Cup; Bali 9s		
Israel	Overview	Peres Peace Team, Israel Beasts	Tel Aviv Cheetahs	AFL Israel		Israel Cup	6th at the 2024 Euro Cup (Out of 14 teams)	
Laos	Overview		Lao Elephants					
Malaysia	Overview		Warriors			Asian Championships		
Pakistan	Overview	Dragoons		AFL Pakistan	Swat			
Philippines	Overview	Philippine Eagles	Philippine Eagles	PAFL		Asian Championships		
Qatar	Overview		Doha			Dubai 9s		
Singapore	Overview		Singapore Wombats			Asian Championships		
Thailand	Overview		Thailand Tigers			Asian Championships		
United Arab Emirates	Overview		Dubai Dingoes; Dubai Dragons; Dubai Heat			Asian Championships; Dubai 9s		
Vietnam	Overview		Vietnam Swans	AFL Asia	SAFL; HAFL	Asian Championships		

Countries with some history of Australian Rules and/or a club in development:

Country	Overview	National team	Major teams/clubs	Governing Body	Main league competition(s)	Main cup competition(s)	Best Men's International performance (tournament)	Best Women's International performance (tournament)
(Timor-Leste) East Timor	Overview	Crocodiles						
Lebanon	Overview	Falcons						
Macau	Overview	Lightning	None	None	None	None		
South Korea	Overview	None	None	None	None	None		
Sri Lanka	Overview	Lions	None	None	None	None		

== Europe ==
+Countries with an established league and/or non-Australian-based national team:

Country	Overview	National team	Major teams/clubs	Governing Body	Main league competition(s)	Main cup competition(s)	Best Men's International performance (tournament)	Best Women's International performance (tournament)
Austria	Overview	Avalanche	Styrian DownUnderDogs Vienna Galahs			CEAFL Cup, EU Cup		
Catalonia	Overview			LFAC	LFAC	EU Cup		
Czech Republic	Overview	Dragons	Prague Dragons	CAAFL	CAAFL League	EU Cup		
Denmark	Overview	Vikings	Farum Cats	DAFL	DAFL Premier League	Doctor's Cup	4th, 2002	
Croatia	Overview	Knights	Zagreb Hawks, Agram Power, Velika Gorica Bombers	CAARF	CRO League	EU Cup		
England	Overview	Dragonslayers (Form part of the Great Britain Bulldogs for the IC)		AFL Britain	AFL London; Southern Division; Central & North West Division; North East Division	Brit Cup; EU Cup		
France	Overview	Les Bleus	Aix-Marseille Dockers; Bordeaux Bombers; Montpellier Fire Sharks; Paris Cockerels; Perpignan Tigers; Strasbourg Kangaroos; Toulouse Crocodiles	UFFA	UFFA; ARFLF	EU Cup	14th, 2011	
Finland	Overview	Ice Breakers	Helsinki Heatseekers; Salo Juggernauts; Espoo Roos; Turku Dockers; Waasa Wombats		FAFL	EU Cup	14th, 2008	
Germany	Overview	Black Eagles	Munich Kangaroos; Frankfurt Redbacks; Rheinland Lions; Hamburg Dockers; Berlin Crocodiles; Stuttgart Emus	AFLG	AFLG	EU Cup, Tri-Nations		
Iceland	Overview	Ravens	Bulls; Eagles; Dragons	IceAFL		EU Cup		
(Republic of Ireland) Ireland	Overview	Warriors		ARFLI	ARFLI		1st, 2002 and 2011	
Italy	Overview	Azzurri	Roma Blues; Milano Aussie Rulers; Genova Dockers	AFL Italia				
Montenegro	Overview	Survivors		AFL Crnu Gora				
Netherlands	Overview	The Flying Dutchmen	Delft Blues Waterland Eagles; Amsterdam Devils	DAFA	DAFA Premiership	EU Cup		
Norway	Overview	Trolls	Oslo Crows; Ås Battlers; Tromsø					
Scotland	Overview	Clansmen (Form part of the Great Britain Bulldogs for the IC), Sirens	Edinburgh Bloods; Glasgow Sharks; Greater Glasgow Giants; Kingdom Kangaroos; West Lothian Eagles	AFL Britain	SARFL	Haggis Cup EU Cup		
Spain	Overview	Bulls	Madrid Bears; Móstoles Kangaroos				10th, 2005	
Sweden	Overview	Elks		AFL Sweden	SAFL; SAFF	Tri-Nations	8th, 2008	
Switzerland		Steinbocks	Winterthur Lions; Basel Dragons; Geneva Jets	AFL Switzerland				
United Kingdom	Overview	Bulldogs			AFL Britain; WARFL; SARFL		6th, 2002 & 2005	
Wales	Overview	Cymru Red Dragons (Form part of the Great Britain Bulldogs for the IC)	Cardiff Double Blues; Gwent Tigers; South Cardiff Panthers; Swansea Magpies; Vale Warriors	AFL Britain	WARFL	Dragon Cup		

Countries with at least one active club and/or national team including Australian players:

Country	Overview	National team	Major teams/clubs	Governing Body	Main league competition(s)	Main cup competition(s)	Best Men's International performance (tournament)	Best Women's International performance (tournament)
Belgium	Overview		Brussels Saints			EU Cup		
Poland	Overview	Polish Devils	Warsaw Bisons, Fort Nysa, Wrocław Lions	AFL Polska	AFL Polska	EU Cup		
Russia	Overview	Czars	The Pirates; The Shooters; Slavyane; St. Petersburg Cats; Lazy Coalas	ФАФР		EU Cup		
Hungary	Overview	Cats	Budapest Bats	AFL Hungary		EU Cup		

Other countries with some history of Australian Rules:

Country	Overview	National team	Major teams/clubs	Governing Body	Main league competition(s)	Main cup competition(s)
(Georgia (country)) Georgia	Overview			Ozirulz Georgia		

== Oceania ==
Countries with active league(s) and national teams.

Country	Overview	National team	Major teams/clubs	Governing Body	Main league competition(s)	Main cup competition(s)	Best Men's International performance (tournament)	Best Women's International performance (tournament)
Australia	Overview	Galahs All-Australian Team	List of clubs	AFL	AFL; SANFL; WAFL; VFL; Queensland State; NTFL; Sydney AFL; TSL; O&M MFL; VWFL; SAWFL; SWAFL; WAWFL; ACTWAFL; NTWARFA	AFL Grand Final; NAB Cup; TAC Cup	Ineligible	
Fiji	Overview	Tribe	Nausori Cats; Raiwaqa Bulldogs; Suva City Swans; Suva Lions	AFL Fiji	AFL Fiji		10th, 2014	
Nauru	Overview	Chiefs		Nauru Australian Football Association	NAFA Senior League; NAFA Junior League		5th, 2008	
New Zealand	Overview	Falcons		AFL New Zealand	Auckland AFL; Canterbury AFL; Waikato AFL; Wellington AFL	NPC	1st, 2005	
Papua New Guinea	Overview	Mosquitos		PNG Rules Football Council	Goroka; Kimbe; Lae; Mt Hagen; Port Moresby; Rabaul; Eastern Highland	NPC	1st, 2008; 2014	
Samoa	Overview	Kangaroos		Samoa Australian Rules Football Association			5th, 2005	
Tonga	Overview	Black Marlins		Tonga Australian Football Association				
Vanuatu	Overview			AFL Vanuatu				

Other countries with some history of Australian Rules:

Country	Overview	National team	Major teams/clubs	Governing Body	Main league competition(s)	Main cup competition(s)
Solomon Islands	Overview					
