= Mtutuzeli Hlomela =

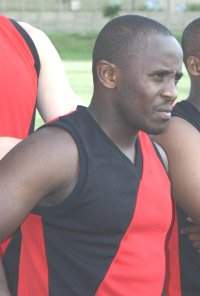

Personal information
- Born: South Africa
- Height: 168 cm (5 ft 6 in)
- Position: Midfielder

Club information
- Current club: Eldorado Park

Playing career
Years	Club	Games (Goals)
1998	Sturt Football Club	2 (0)

International team honours
Years	Team	Games (Goals)
2002, 2005	South Africa	2 (?)

Mtutuzeli Hlomela is the captain of the South African national Australian rules football team (Buffaloes) and since 2005 head coach of AFL South Africa and is of the most successful Aussie Rules players/coaches to come out of South Africa.

Mtutu had played soccer at junior level and at age 17, won a "football" scholarship through the South Australian and Western Cape sports ministries. Mistakenly believing his application was a soccer position, and he was able to pass his interview from a quick crash course in the sport.

Arriving in Adelaide, Mtutu was able to successfully convert from soccer to Australian Football, playing for the Sturt Football Club in the South Australian National Football League.

After a season at Under 19 level in 1998 as part of his scholarship, Tutu returned to South Africa where he played for Eldorado Park in AFL South Africa.

Mtutu represented his country as part of the national team that competed in both the 2002 and 2005 Australian Football International Cups as captain/coach, where his outstanding performances earned him a spot on the All-International team.

Mtutu was appointed AFL Development Manager for the Gauteng Province, where he successful in introducing thousands of young children to the sport.

In 2005, he was appointed the full-time position of head coach of AFL South Africa.

Among his coaching honours are:

- The junior Buffaloes at the 2006 Barassi International Australian Football Youth Tournament
- The Buffaloes to surprise victory against the Australian Convicts in February 2007
- The South African Under 19 team on their indigenous tour to Australia in February 2007
- The senior Buffaloes squad against the Australian Institute of Sport Under 17 team from Australia in 2007
