= Nathan Krakouer =

Australian rules footballer

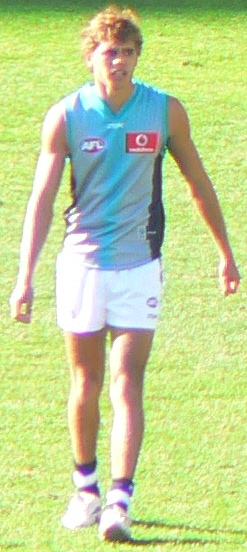
- Krakouer playing for Port Adelaide in 2007

Personal information
- Full name: Nathan Rhys Krakouer
- Nickname: Krak
- Born: 5 May 1988 (age 38)
- Original team: Claremont (WAFL)
- Draft: No. 39, 2006 national draft
- Height: 188 cm (6 ft 2 in)
- Weight: 78 kg (172 lb)
- Position: Midfielder/defender

Playing career^{1}
Years	Club	Games (Goals)
2007–2010	Port Adelaide	40 (7)
2011	Gold Coast	13 (8)
2015–2017	Port Adelaide	29 (9)
Total		82 (24)
- ^{1} Playing statistics correct to the end of 2017.

Career highlights
- Inaugural Gold Coast team

Nathan Krakouer (born 5 May 1988) is a former professional Australian rules footballer who played for the Port Adelaide Football Club and Gold Coast Football Club in the Australian Football League (AFL). He is the nephew of former North Melbourne football players Jimmy Krakouer and Phil Krakouer and cousin of former Richmond and Collingwood player Andrew Krakouer.

== Early life ==
Krakouer began his junior football in Western Australia before playing senior football with the Claremont Football Club at a young age.

In 2006 he represented Australia's indigenous youth on tour to South Africa with the "Flying Boomerangs" to play against the South African national Australian rules team.

He was invited to 2006 AFL Draft Camp where despite weighing just 61 kilograms he impressed scouts with both acceleration and standing jump for his height.

== AFL career ==
=== Port Adelaide (2007–2010) ===
The slightly-built rookie teenager was recruited by AFL club Port Adelaide in the 2006 AFL draft. He was the player the Power was most surprised to be able to pick when it grabbed him at number 39. Krakouer shone at the 2006 AFL Draft camp in Canberra, setting a sizzling time in the 20 metre sprint on the second day of the camp. His time of 2.83 seconds puts his result in the top handful of all time, out of nearly a thirty players over the last 12 or 13 years.

Wearing the number 29 guernsey, he has played 11 games for Port in his debut 2007 AFL season, despite coach Mark Williams earlier predicting that he would not play for at least two years. As at the end of round 7, he had an impressive total of 48 kicks, 24 marks, 18 handballs, 66 disposals and 4 goals.

His explosive speed and raw talent has been progressively emerging throughout the season. Notably, he played a crucial role in securing a win over North Melbourne in round 2, with a significant hand in three Port goals in 15 minutes; three such goals being in the last five minutes of the game. Krakouer was also the only Power player to take more than one inside-50 mark in Port's loss to the Crows in Showdown XXII.

At the end of round 7, Krakouer was ranked sixth among the AFL Rising Stars in total kicks and total marks, and seventh in total goals.

In 2008, Krakouer managed just three games for the Power due to recurring soft tissue injuries, and was granted permission by the club to return home to Western Australia after suffering a season-ending hamstring strain in round 15. This led to speculation that Krakouer would seek a potential trade to the Fremantle Football Club or West Coast Eagles, two West Australian based clubs. However this never happened, with Krakouer stating: "I had a talk to Choco (Williams) and I just couldn’t do it. I couldn’t tell him I wanted to go back. I felt like I couldn’t just walk out and I’m glad I didn’t."

In 2009, an improvement in fitness and bulk in Krakouer saw him move to the backlines playing as a "sweeper role" and essentially replacing Peter Burgoyne who returned to his original position as a midfielder. Krakouer played well in this role, averaging over 20 possessions in the 2009 NAB Cup, and being named in the Power's round 1 game of the season.

Season 2010 was forgetful for Krakouer as he was limited to just seven games due to injuries and lack of form.

=== Gold Coast (2011) ===
On 1 September 2010, Krakouer signed a three-year deal with the Gold Coast Suns. He was the second uncontracted player to do so following Nathan Bock who left Adelaide. He left despite the disappointment of Port Adelaide which stated that "given the commitment our football club has made to Nathan's development and welfare over the last four years, we are very disappointed at the way the matter has been handled in recent weeks". The proximity to the end of the 2010 season led to a perception that Krakouer had decided to leave Port Adelaide during the preceding season, adding to criticism of the AFL for allowing expansion teams to recruit one uncontracted player from each of the 16 existing clubs.

In December 2011, Krakouer was released by the Suns due to "personal reasons" despite being contracted to the end of the 2012 season.

=== Return to Port Adelaide (2015–2017) ===
On 31 March, Krakouer was signed to play for the Port Adelaide Magpies in hope to re-ignite his AFL career. He polled best and fairest votes in 12 of his 16 games, and was subsequently drafted as a rookie by Port Adelaide's AFL side.

Starting on the rookie list in 2015, he impressed in the pre-season trial matches and was quickly promoted from the rookie list to play his first AFL game for the Power since 2010 in round 3 as his accurate kicking and smooth movement off the half back line proved to be valuable. He played 7 games before being returned to the rookie list. He was immediately reinstated to the senior list as a mid season promotion and went on to play another 7 games for a return of 14 on the season.

At the conclusion of the 2017 season, Krakouer announced his retirement from AFL football.
