= Gauteng Province Australian Football League =

The Gauteng Province Australian Football League is an Australian rules football competition in South Africa operating out of the province of Gauteng.

== History ==
The league began with Eldorado Park (the Eldos), formed by a development officer in 2002. In 2003, a club from Pretoria was formed. Teams from Johannesburg and RAU University were included in 2004.

== Clubs ==
- Eldorado Park
- RAU University
- Johannesburg
- Pretoria

== See also ==
- AFL South Africa
- Australian rules football in South Africa
- List of Australian rules football leagues outside Australia
