= North West Province Australian Football League =

Australian-rules football competition in North West Province, South Africa

The North West Province Australian Football League is an Australian rules football competition in South Africa operating out of the North West Province.

== Clubs ==
- Christiana
- Ventersdorp
- Ganyesa SCORE community
- Bodibe
- Verdwaal
- Rustenburg
- Mafikeng
- Vryberg
- Itsoseng
- Ramatlabama

== See also ==
- AFL South Africa
- Australian rules football in South Africa
- List of Australian rules football leagues outside Australia
