= JB Marks Oval =

Cricket ground

Coordinates: 26°41′44.37″S 27°06′2.78″E

- Interactive map of JB Marks Oval

Ground information
- Location: Potchefstroom
- Country: South Africa
- Capacity: 18,000
- End names
- JB Marks End; University End

International information
- First men's Test: 25–27 October 2002: South Africa v Bangladesh
- Last men's Test: 28 September–2 October 2017: South Africa v Bangladesh
- First men's ODI: 20 October 2000: South Africa v New Zealand
- Last men's ODI: 30 September 2026: South Africa v Australia
- First men's T20I: 29 October 2017: South Africa v Bangladesh
- Last men's T20I: 12 October 2018: South Africa v Zimbabwe
- First women's ODI: 10 March 2002: South Africa v India
- Last women's ODI: 11 December 2024: South Africa v England
- First women's T20I: 27 October 2011: South Africa v England
- Last women's T20I: 10 February 2026: South Africa v Pakistan

Team information
North West
Lions
- As of 11 October 2026; Source: Cricinfo

JB Marks Oval is a cricket ground in Potchefstroom, North West Province, South Africa. As of September 2025, it has hosted two Test matches, the first in 2002, and the second in 2017, both featuring the South Africa and Bangladesh national teams. The Highveld Lions also play some home matches here. The stadium is home to AFL South Africa – the Australian rules football body responsible for developing the game in that country – as well as the South African national Australian rules football team, the Lions. On 29 October 2017, the venue hosted its first T20I match for South Africa against Bangladesh, which was the 100th T20I for South Africa.

As of September 2021, due to a naming rights agreement, the ground was renamed to JB Marks Oval. It has previously been known as Senwes Park and Sedgars Park.

== See also ==
- List of Test cricket grounds
