= Flying Boomerangs =

Names
- Full name: Flying Boomerangs

Club details
- Founded: 1973
- Colours: Black Red Yellow The Aboriginal colors.

Other information

The Flying Boomerangs are the underage Indigenous Australian Australian rules football team for men (the underage women's team is known as the Woomeras and the senior team is the Indigenous All-Stars).

From 2008 to 2017 the team toured overseas playing tests against junior teams from Papua New Guinea, South Africa, New Zealand and developing pacific nations. The team was hosted by the AFL NT and based in Darwin, Northern Territory.

In 2018 the AFL Commission restructured it to become part of the AFL's diversity program and it now participate in an annual match in Melbourne against a World Team consisting of underage players with a parent born outside Australia.

== Identity ==
The team is named after the aboriginal hunting tool, the boomerang. The team wears the colours of the Aboriginal flag - A black guernsey featuring a yellow upside down boomerang below which are red stripes.

== History ==
In 2013, the Flying Boomerangs toured to play the South African national Australian rules football team in both Australia and South Africa. They toured Papua New Guinea, the first international team to defeat them in Australian rules football and also New Zealand winning both matches.

Apart from representing Australia in international Australian Rules Football, the Flying Boomerangs team members have gone on to play in the Australian Football League.

Other tours include Papua New Guinea (2009), Tonga (2010) and Fiji (2011) to compete against the underage Oceania and Pacific Islands teams. Andrew Mcleod (head coach) and Chris Johnson (assistant coach) were also part of the team in 2010. In 2017 Barry Lawrence was named head coach and Harry Miller as assistant coach.

The Flying Boomerangs have been featured nationally in a documentary on ABC TV during their tour to South Africa.

== Notable matches and tours ==
Matches
Year	Date	Opponent	Result	Stadium	Captain (vice-captain)	Coach	Best	Crowd	Notes/References
2017	December	New Zealand Academy	Flying Boomerangs 26.9 (165) def New Zealand Academy 3.2 (20)	Outer Oval, North Harbour Stadium			Frank Szekely		
2017	December	South Pacific All Stars		Albert Park (Suva) Fiji		Barry Lawrence			
2013	December	New Zealand (U16)	Flying Boomerangs 16.23 (119) def New Zealand 2.3 (15)	Hutt Park Wellington, New Zealand					
2013	February	South Pacific Nations	Flying Boomerangs 13.5 (83) def South Pacific 10.9 (69)	Blacktown International Sportspark					
2013	January	South Africa	Flying Boomerangs 17.15 (117) def South Africa 4.8 (32)	Durban					
2011				Fiji		Andrew Mcleod			
2010				Tonga					
2010		South Africa (Coastal Squad)	Flying Boomerangs 17.10 (112) def. South Africa (Coastal Squad)	Nyanga Cricket Ground, Cape Town					
2010		South Africa (Inland Squad)	Flying Boomerangs 9.13 (67) def. South Africa (Inland Squad) 8.9 (57)	Mohadin Cricket Ground, Potchefstroom					
2009		Central Highlands (Papua New Guinea)	Flying Boomerangs 7.10 (52) def. Central Highlands 2.2 (14)	University of Papua New Guinea Port Moresby, Papua New Guinea				8,000	
2009		Papua New Guinea (U18)	Flying Boomerangs 9.11 (65) def. by Papua New Guinea (U18) 9.12 (66)	Lae, Papua New Guinea				2,500	
2008		South Africa	Flying Boomerangs 11.10 (76) def. South Africa 8.9 (57)						
2008		South Africa	Flying Boomerangs 19.9 (123) def. South Africa 2.11 (23)						

== Sponsors ==
- Qantas (2010-2016)
- Rio Tinto (2017-2020)

== Alumni ==
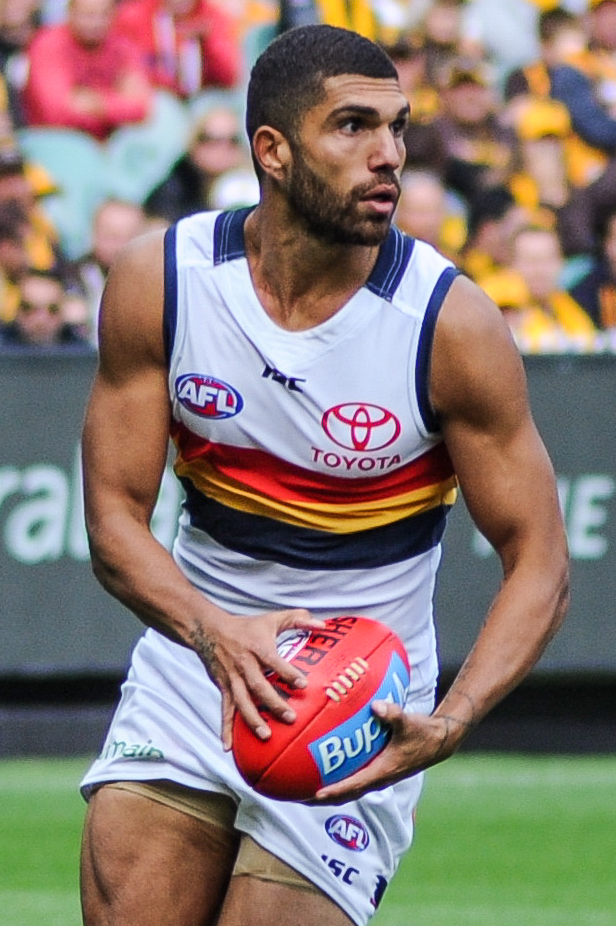
Curtly Hampton

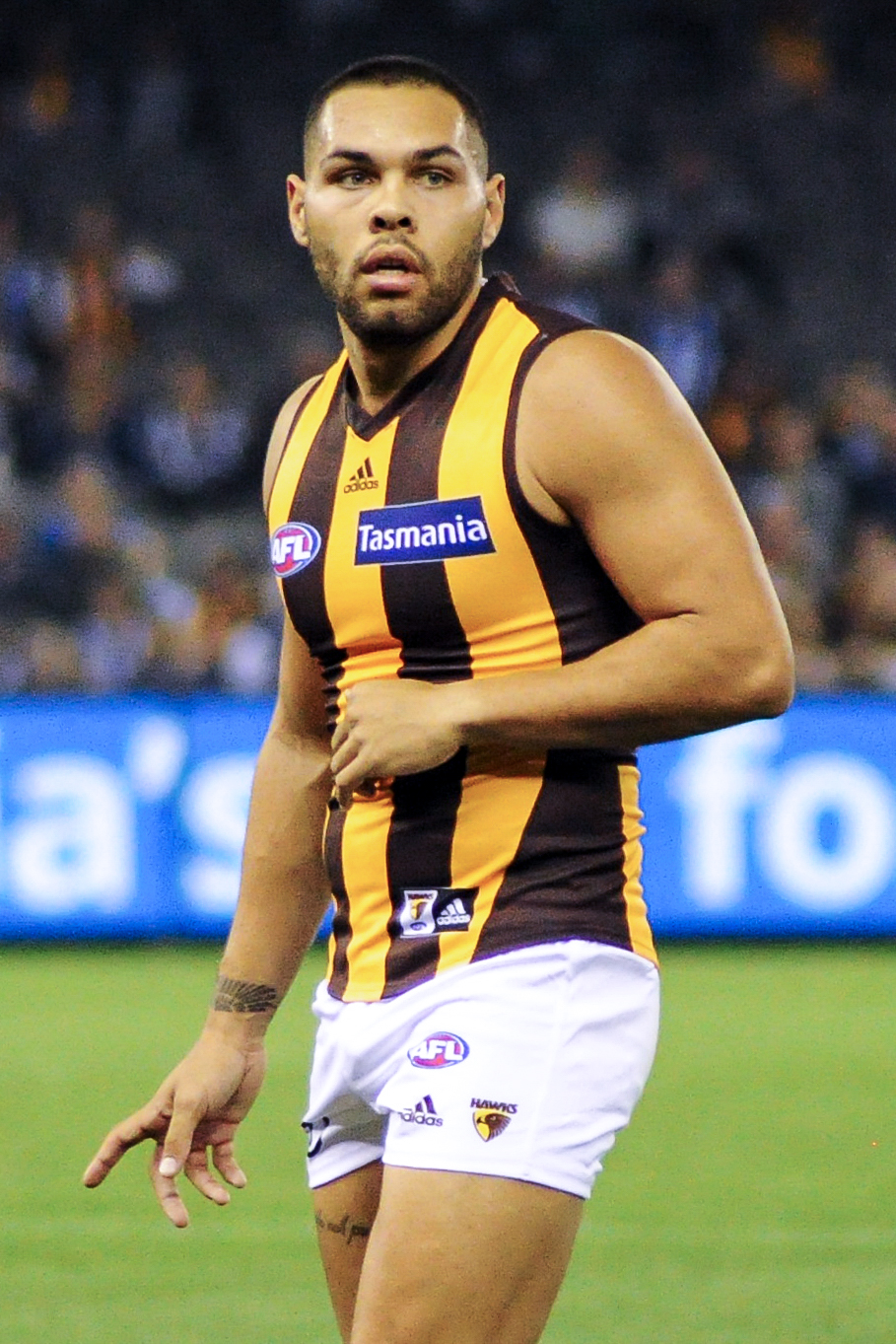
Jarman Impey

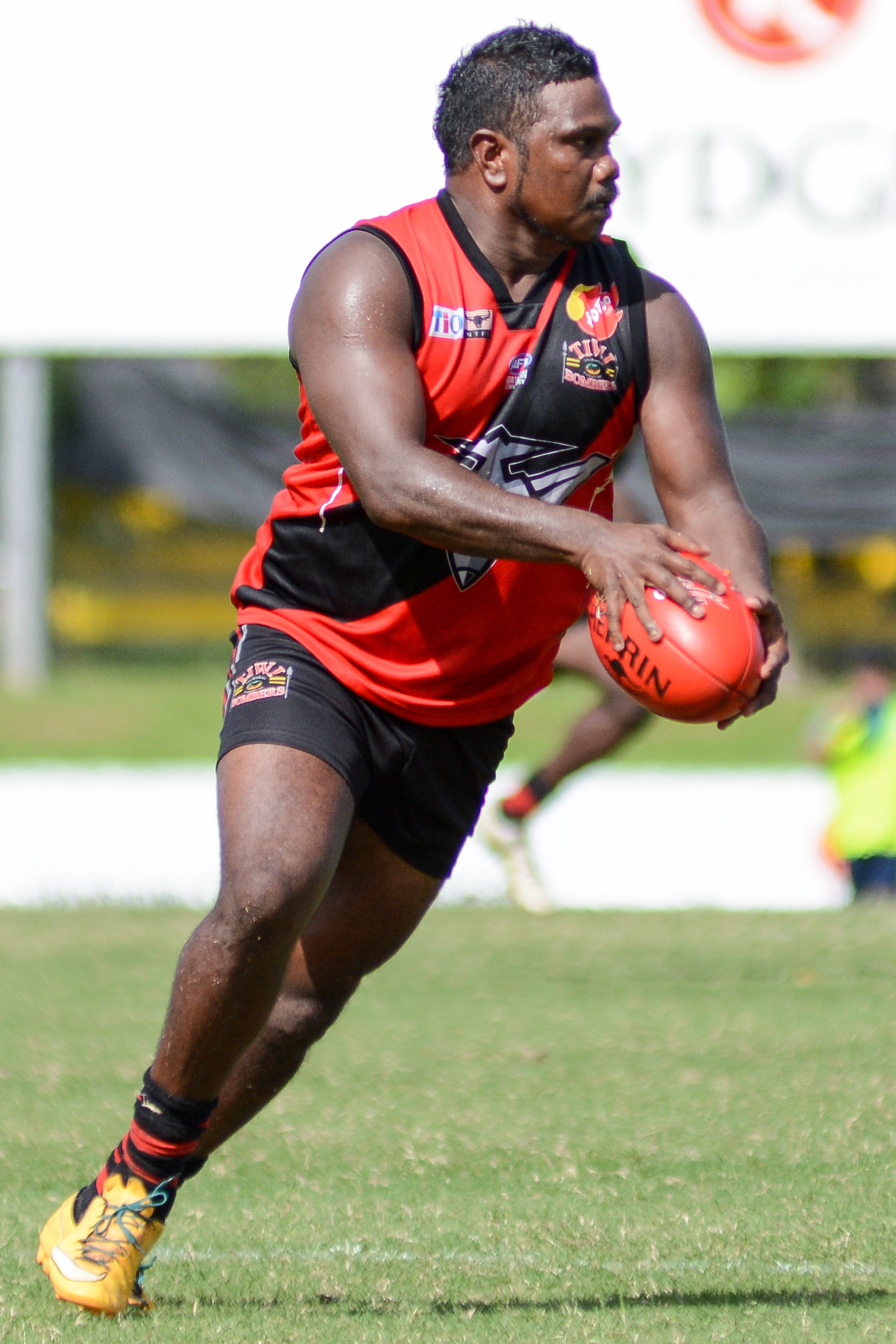
Austin Wonaeamirri

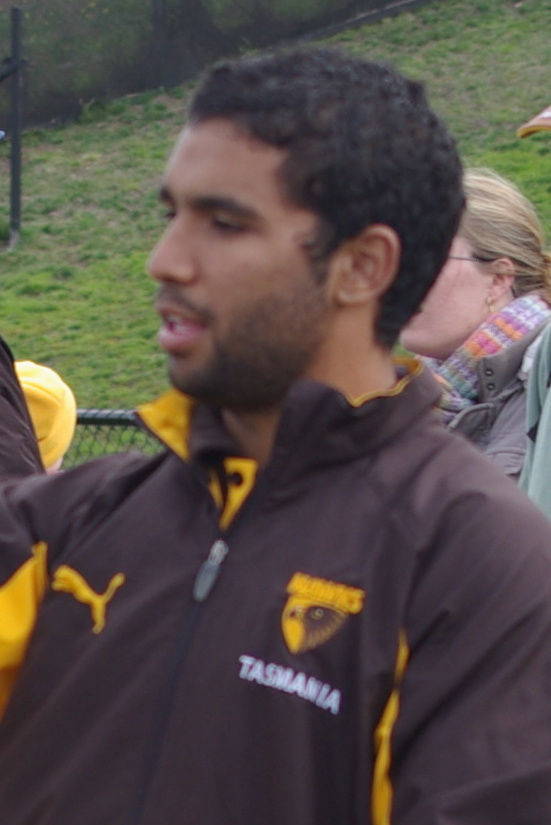
Cameron Stokes

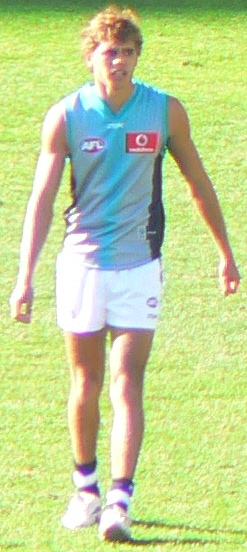
Nathan Krakouer

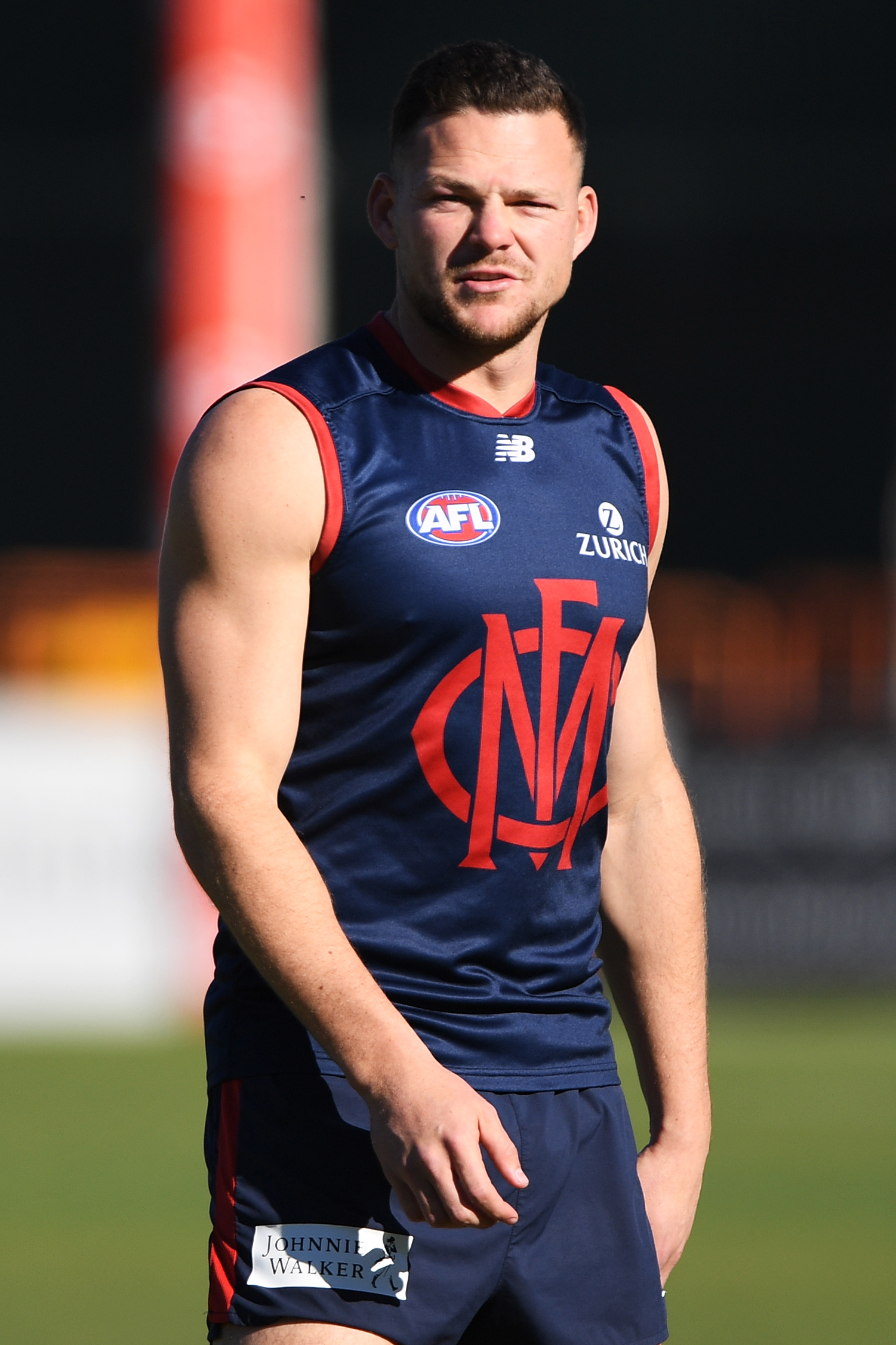
Steven May

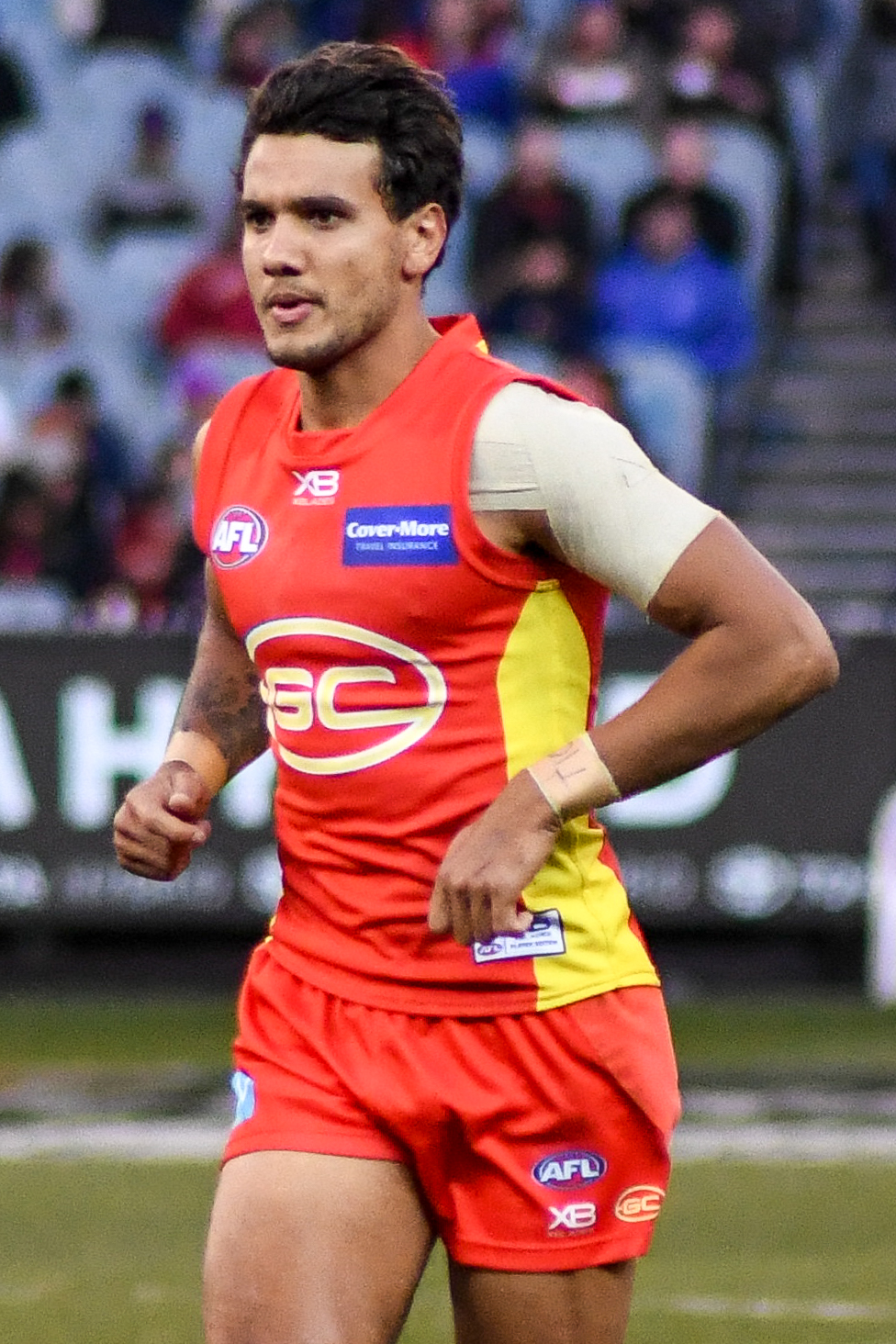
Callum Ah Chee

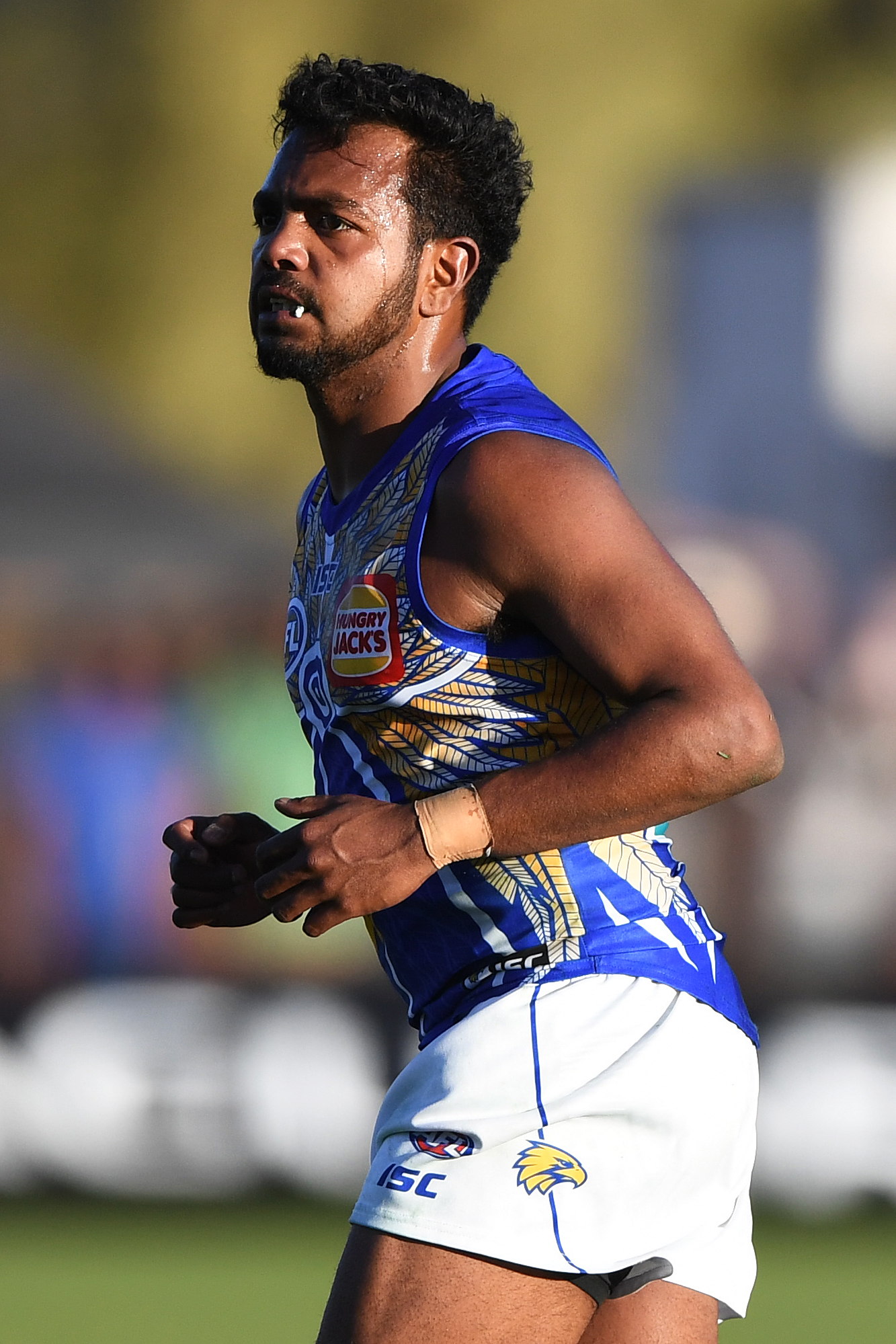
Willie Rioli
- Austin Wonaeamirri
- Leroy Jetta
- Malcolm Lynch
- Cameron Stokes
- Isaac Weetra
- Nathan Krakouer
- Steven May
- Curtly Hampton
- Rex Liddy
- Jarman Impey
- Jamarra Ugle-Hagan
- Peter Yagmoor
- Callum Ah Chee
- Joel Jeffrey
- Willie Rioli

== See also ==
- Indigenous All-Stars
