= George Cornelius (footballer) =

Australian rules footballer

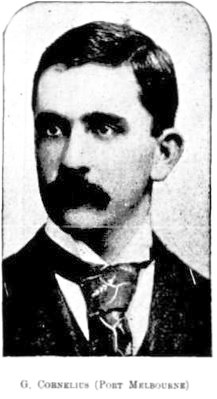
- Cornelius in 1895

Personal information
- Full name: George Cornelius
- Born: 12 August 1874; South Melbourne, Victoria
- Died: 7 July 1966 (aged 91); Cheltenham, Victoria
- Original team: Port Melbourne

Playing career^{1}
| Years | Club | Games (Goals) |
| 1898 | South Melbourne | 16 (2) |
| 1901 | Carlton | 1 (0) |
| Total | | 17 (2) |
- ^{1} Playing statistics correct to the end of 1901.

George Cornelius (12 August 1874 – 7 July 1966) was an Australian rules footballer who played with South Melbourne and Carlton in the Victorian Football League (VFL).

He was Port Melbourne Football Club's youngest ever captain at age 20. However shocked the VFA when he left for Durban South Africa in 1896 to start organising and captaining matches there and became one of the founders of Australian rules football in South Africa.

However, after a few years in Durban he would return to Australia to compete in the newly formed VFL with Souths.

== Notes ==
1. de Moore, Greg; Hess, Rob; Nicholson, Matthew; Stewart, Bob (2021). Australia's Game: The History of Australian Football. Hardie Grant Books. ISBN 9781-74379-657-3.
