= Philippines national Australian rules football team =

Philippines
- Nickname(s): Eagles
- Governing body: Philippine Australian Football League
- Top scorer: Blake Broadhurst (24 goals)

Rankings
- Current: Not ranked (as of October 2022)

International Cup
- Appearances: 0

The Philippines national Australian rules football team, nicknamed the Philippine Eagles (Tagalog: Mga Agila ng Pilipinas) represents the Philippines internationally in Australian rules football.

They also compete as a club at the Philippine Australian Football League, alongside the Eurekas and Dingoes, and are a full member club of AFL Asia.

== History ==
The national team was established in 2004, the same year the Philippine Australian Football League, a small-scale Australian rules football league, was founded by co-founders Peter Stone and Derek Ackary. The national team was formed from players of two existing regular teams, the Dingoes and the Eurekas. The three teams, including the national team as the Philippine Eagles, competed in the Philippine Australian Football League.

The Philippine Eagles has competed in at least eleven international tournaments. They have also competed in the Asian Australian Football Championships as a club side, winning the tournament in 2016, overcoming the Singapore Wombats in the final and settling for second place in 2013 after losing to the Hong Kong Dragons in the grand final. Their first ever title in an international competition was at the Manila International Cup in 2013.

The Philippines is aiming to make their debut at the Australian Football International Cup in 2020.
