= Cec Graeme =

Australian rules footballer

Personal information
- Full name: Cecil Richard Grimes Graeme
- Born: 3 June 1873; Stawell, Victoria
- Died: 1912; Barberton, Mpumalanga, South Africa
- Original team: Wesley College

Playing career^{1}
Years	Club	Games (Goals)
1901	St Kilda	7 (0)
- ^{1} Playing statistics correct to the end of 1901.

Cecil Richard Graeme (3 June 1873 - 1912) was an Australian rules footballer who played with St Kilda in the Victorian Football League (VFL).
