= Ian Muller =

Australian rules footballer

Personal information
- Full name: Ian Armstrong Muller
- Born: 23 July 1965 (age 61); South Africa
- Original team: Maffra/Scotch College
- Height: 186 cm (6 ft 1 in)
- Weight: 81 kg (179 lb)

Playing career^{1}
Years	Club	Games (Goals)
1984–1985	Carlton	6 (0)
1988–1991	St Kilda	21 (2)
Total		27 (2)
- ^{1} Playing statistics correct to the end of 1991.

Ian Armstrong Muller (born 23 July 1965) is a former Australian rules footballer who played with Carlton and St Kilda in the Australian Football League (AFL).

Muller was a member of Moyhu's 2003 Ovens & King Football League premiership team and was their non playing coach from 2021 to 2022.
