= Barassi International Australian Football Youth Tournament =

The Barassi Youth Tournament is an international Australian rules football tournament for junior players who are up to 16 years of age. In conjunction with the Australian Football International Cup senior competition, the youth cup is an important event for the development of Aussie Rules internationally giving the opportunity for junior players to compete and share a cultural experience.

The tournament was held every 2–3 years in Canberra, the national capital of Australia. 2008 was the last year the tournament was held.

In 2004 a tournament was held in Christchurch, New Zealand between 2 combined teams from Australia and 2 New Zealand teams. This tournament was organised by the Canterbury AFL with the sanction of the Barassi Youth Tournament. Ron Barassi was there to encourage the players of both countries. This was the first junior international Australian rules football tournament to be played outside of Australia. Chris Girvan from Queanbeyan, New South Wales was named team captain for Australia by Ron Barassi for the first inaugural junior international Australian rules football tournament to be played outside of Australia. He was also awarded the Ron Barassi Medal for being Best and Fairest in Australia's 117 - 34 win over New Zealand.

The tournament is officially endorsed by the Australian Football League as part of its International Policy.

== History ==
The tournament began in 1998 as the Jim Stynes Cup international tournament, named after Jim Stynes a player who had a fairytale football career, converting from Gaelic football to Aussie Rules, moved from Ireland to play with the Melbourne Football Club and later awarded the Brownlow medal as the fairest and best player in the elite Australian Football League.

This competition was founded by dedicated locals like Roger Ley and Peter Cates whose aim was to introduce the game to countries all over the world. They also identified the need to increase cultural awareness and break down barriers between races using sport as the conduit.

Recently, the competition was renamed to honour the football legend Ron Barassi a player with Italian origins who is widely acknowledged as one of the greatest ever Aussie Rules identities as both player and coach. Ron Barassi is now also the patron of the organisation.

Subsequent tournaments have been held in 2001, 2003. As well as Australian amateur teams from the Australian Capital Territory, Western Australia and the Northern Territory other countries (depending on availability) including New Zealand, South Africa, Samoa, Denmark, New Zealand, United States and Nauru have participated.

The 2006 tournament featured teams from South Africa and New Zealand, as well as an all-indigenous teams from the Kimberleys and Kormilda College, NT and local team from the Australian Capital Territory represented. Papua New Guinea did not participate.

The 2008 tournament was cancelled after only two international sides committed to participating and a 2009 tournament was flagged instead.
