= South Africa national Australian rules football team =

South Africa
- Nickname(s): The Lions formerly the Buffaloes
- Governing body: AFL South Africa

Rankings
- Current: 9th (as of October 2022)

First international
- New Zealand 163 – 1 South Africa (2002)

International Cup
- Appearances: 6 (first in 2002)
- Best result: 3rd (2008)

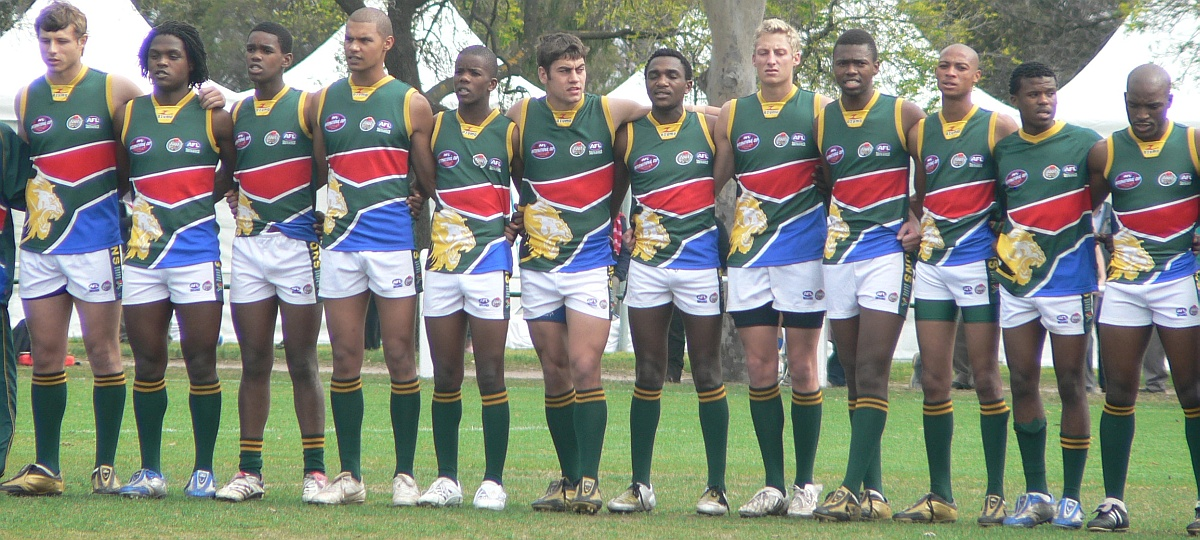
South Africa lining up for national anthem before a match against Ireland during a final in the 2008 AFIC

The South African national Australian rules football team, nicknamed the Lions, represent South Africa in the sport of Australian rules football.

The senior side represents the best South African born and developed players as selected from clubs and leagues of AFL South Africa.

South Africa had its international debut at the 2002 Australian Football International Cup but the inexperienced team went through the tournament winless. It registered its first international win in the 2005 Australian Football International Cup against Japan. Between 2007 and 2010, through significant development funding and reciprocal tours, South Africa competed annually against the AFL Academy (Australia's Under 17 team) and against numerous touring amateur teams from Australia. This resulted in a dramatic improvement at senior level, with South Africa achieving its best result, 3rd overall in the 2008 AFIC.

== Identity ==
The team is nicknamed the Lions, although at the 2002 International Cup and 2005 International Cup they were known as the Buffaloes.

They have worn a different jumper at each International Cup, with the first jumper green with gold and red wings, the second green with a gold yoke, and the current jumper based on the Flag of South Africa with a stylised Lion.

== History ==
The team competed in the 2002 Australian Football International Cup in Melbourne, finishing in 11th place.

A much improved Buffaloes outfit (reflecting the development of junior footy in South Africa) achieved 8th ranking at the 2005 International Cup.

The Buffalo's best and fairest player (from the 2005 International Cup) is Steven Malinga.

Since 2006, the team has played annually against the "Flying Boomerangs" under 18 indigenous Australian squad, with tours alternating between South Africa and the Northern Territory in Australia.

On 14 April 2007, the Buffaloes played a historic match against Australia's Under 17 squad at North West Cricket Stadium in Potchefstroom, South Africa. The team was soundly defeated.

Later in that year, the Buffaloes defeated the touring Australian Convicts side.

In the warm-up to the 2008 Australian Football International Cup, South Africa gave a Melbourne-based multicultural team organised by the AFL and known as "Team Africa" a football lesson. Surprising many with their skill and pace, they went on to go undefeated through the first 3 pool rounds including a win against the USA and secured a finals berth against the 2005 runners-up Papua New Guinea. However Papua New Guinea were too good for the much improved South Africans.

== Results ==
=== 2002 ===
==== International Cup ====
- New Zealand 25.13 (163) def. South Africa 0.1 (1)
- Canada 4.11 (38) def. South Africa 1.5 (11)
- Samoa 12.15 (87) def. South Africa 1.4 (10)
- Ireland 15.8 (98) def. South Africa 3.3 (21)
- USA 20.12 (132) def. South Africa 0.4 (4)

=== 2005 ===
==== International Cup ====
- USA 9.8 (62) def. South Africa 4.10 (34)
- South Africa 4.6 (30) def. Japan 4.4 (28)
- Ireland 10.9 (69) def. South Africa 1.4 (10)
- South Africa 12.12 (84) def. Spain 2.1 (13)
- Samoa 7.8 (50) def. South Africa 3.3 (21)
- Canada 3.9 (27) def. South Africa 2.6 (18)

=== 2007 ===
- Australia (AIS Youth) 23.24 (162) def. South Africa 1.6 (12), North West Cricket Stadium in Potchefstroom
- South Africa def. Australian Convicts (by 7 points)

=== 2008 ===
- Flying Boomerangs 19.9 (123) def. South Africa 2.11 (23)
- Flying Boomerangs 11.10 (76) def. South Africa 8.9 (57)

==== International Cup ====
- South Africa 14.19 (103) def. Team Africa 3.3 (21) (Practice)
- South Africa 20.26 (146) def. China 0.0 (0)
- South Africa 9.11 (65) def. Denmark 3.2 (20)
- South Africa 8.10 (58) def. USA 5.6 (36)
- Papua New Guinea 9.8 (63) def. South Africa 2.3 (15)
- South Africa 4.9 (33) def. Ireland 5.2 (32)

=== 2009 ===
- Australia (AIS Youth) 23.14 (152) def. South Africa 3.2 (20)

=== 2010 ===
- Flying Boomerangs 9.13 (67) def. South Africa (Inland Squad) 8.9 (57), Mohadin Cricket Ground, Potchefstroom
- Flying Boomerangs 17.10 (112) def. South Africa (Coastal Squad) 5.6 (36), Nyanga Cricket Ground, Cape Town
- Australia (AIS Youth) 26.22 (178) def. South Africa 4.5 (29), Cape Town

=== 2011 ===
==== International Cup ====
- South Africa 4.2 (26) def. Denmark 1.3 (9), Blacktown Olympic Park
- South Africa 18.6 (114) def. China 0.0 (0), Blacktown Olympic Park
- South Africa 14.8 (92) def. Japan 1.4 (10), Mona Park, Auburn
- South Africa 2.6 (18) def. by United States 7.14 (56), ANZ Stadium
- South Africa 7.9 (51) def. Great Britain 2.3 (15), Ransford Oval, Royal Park
- South Africa 7.10 (52) def. Nauru 7.4 (46), McAllister Oval, Royal Park

=== 2014 ===
==== International Cup ====
- South Africa 23.22 (160) def. Pakistan 2.2 (14), Ransford Oval, Royal Park
- South Africa 13.4 (82) def. Tonga 2.5 (17), Western Oval, Royal Park
- Papua New Guinea 7.8 (50) def. by South Africa 8.11 (59), St. Mary's Oval, Geelong
- Ireland 8.5 (53) def. South Africa 4.4 (28), Ransford Oval, Royal Park
- New Zealand 6.8 (44) def. South Africa 6.7 (43), Ransford Oval, Royal Park

=== 2017 ===
==== International Cup ====
- South Africa 4.4 (28) def. by Great Britain 9.11 (65), McAlister Oval, Royal Park
- South Africa 2.5 (17) def. by United States 9.10 (64), Wesley College, Glen Waverley
- South Africa 4.5 (29) def. Fiji 3.8 (26), Anthony Costa Oval, Geelong
- Papua New Guinea 16.17 (113) def. South Africa 0.4 (4), Ransford Oval, Royal Park
- South Africa 7.11 (53) def. France 3.3 (21), Ransford Oval, Royal Park

== International Cup ==
- 2002: 11th
- 2005: 8th
- 2008: 3rd
- 2011: 5th
- 2014: 4th
- 2017: 9th

== See also ==
- Australian rules football in South Africa
