= AFL South Africa =

Australian rules football governing body

- Sport: Australian Rules Football
- Jurisdiction: South Africa
- Founded: 1997
- Affiliation: Australian Football League
- Headquarters: Senwes Park Cricket Stadium, Potchefstroom
- Chairman: Peter Fonseca
- Other key staff: July Machethe (General Manager)
- Replaced: Footy South Africa

Official website
- www.aflsouthafrica.org
- (South Africa)

AFL South Africa (formed as "Footy South Africa" in 1997) is the governing body and federation for Australian rules football in South Africa. Its name is due to its formal affiliation in 2004 to the AFL Commission the game's world governing body.

The sport is known in Australia pride itself in South Africa as an all-inclusive sport accommodating people of any form of background or affiliation.

Key events for AFL South Africa are week-in week-out participation programs from 7 years to open age, mainly in primary and high schools, footyWILD Premier League competition contested by 8 clubs and other local competitions. The programs are in North West, Gauteng, Kwa Zulu Natal & Western Cape Provinces.

== History ==
The introduction of the game was in 1997 by the Australian Army based in a town of Mafikeng and early 2003 it was registered as Footy South Africa, then eventually in October 2004 was affiliated to the AFL then became Australian Football League South Africa. Brian Dixon was appointed inaugural president in 2004.

The body was one of the first international governing bodies to affiliate with the Australian Football League, renamed as "AFL South Africa" in 2004.

footyWild

footyWILD Brand was launched in 2007 to be the South African identity of Aussie Rules which has programs such as footyWILD Big 5 for primary schools which is equivalent of AFL Auskick, footyWILD High for high schools, footyWILD Extreme for open age competition & footyWILD Roar Talent for talent scouting.

== National team ==
South African National team is the South African Lions taking its name from the King of the African jungles. The South African National Team participated in all the previous AFL International Cup Events in 2002 as (South African Buffaloes), 2005, 2008, 2011 and 2014 (as South African Lions).

The South African Teams were coached by Dale Alsford (2002), Steven Harrison (2005), Jason McCartney (2008), Steward Edge (2011) and Wayne Miller (2014). Benjamin Motuba, one of the longest serving football player been involved from day one in 1997 is the current S.African Lions Head Coach and the first South African coach marked to coach at the 2017 AFL International Cup.

== Leagues and competitions ==
- footyWILD Premier League

A national competition contested of Wild Cats FC, Platinum Buffaloes FC, Warriors FC, Super Owls FC, Hurricanes FC, Giant Bees FC, Nyanga Blue Birds FC and Real Divines FC

- footyWILD National Championships - Extreme

An open age national competition contested by four provinces namely Gauteng, North West and Kwa Zulu Natal.

- footyWILD National Championships - High

An Under 17 national competition contested by four provinces namely Gauteng, North West and Kwa Zulu Natal.

National Championships

The first national championships were played in 2008. The inaugural winners were North West Dockers

2008 national champions footyWILD Extreme (Open Age) Grand Final North West Dockers 9.11 (65) d Western Cape Magpies 4.9 (33) coached by Reginald Mokotedi currently serving as a Director on the AFL South Africa Board.

2009 national champions : Grand Final – 1st vs 2nd Western Cape Magpies 10.8 (68) def. North West Dockers 4.3 (27)

Coming out of the 2009 Nationals, was the selection of two footyWILD futures squads.

The Inland senior and youth squads comprising players from Gauteng and North-West Province; meanwhile the Coastal senior and youth squads are made up of players from Kwa-Zulu Natal and Western Cape Provinces.

Players selected come from a range of backgrounds including existing National representatives, established Provincial players and young athletes identified through the ROAR Talent program.

The first camps took place in November were both squads played against the Flying Boomerangs Indigenous Youth team in 2010.

A major camp involving both squads provided a selection opportunity to the SA Lions for the fourth AIS/AFL Academy tour of South Africa in 2011 that took place at Sahara Park, Newlands which was a South Africa's domestic season opener.

Inbound Tours Hosted To Date:

- Australian Army - 1997
- Brisbane Lions & Fremantle Dockers - 1998 (Exhibition Match in Cape Town)
- Fremantle Football Club - 1998, 2008 and 2009
- St Kilda Football Club - 2004
- Convicts - 2005
- Australian Indigenous Team (Flying Boomerangs) - 2006, 2008, 2010 and 2013
- Geelong College - 2007
- Subiaco FC - 2007
- Australian Institute of Sport / AFL Under 17 - 2007 & 2011
- Carlton FC vs. Fremantle Dockers (Exhibition Match in Pretoria's Supersport Park Stadium)
- Carlton FC - 2008
- West Coast Eagles FC - 2008
- Collingwood FC - 2008
- School Sport Australia - 2012, 2013
- St Marys FC - 2012, 2014 & 2016
- Hawthorn FC - 2013

The partners are

- North West Academy of Sport
- Australian High Commission
- BlueScope
- Australian Business Chamber of Commerce Southern Africa

== See also ==
- Australian rules football in South Africa
- Countries playing Australian rules football
