= Australian rules football in Oceania =

Australian rules football in Oceania is the sport of Australian rules football as it is watched and played in the Oceanian continent. The regional governing and development body, AFL South Pacific (formerly AFL Oceania), is affiliated to the AFL Commission (but does not include Australia) and was formed in 2008.

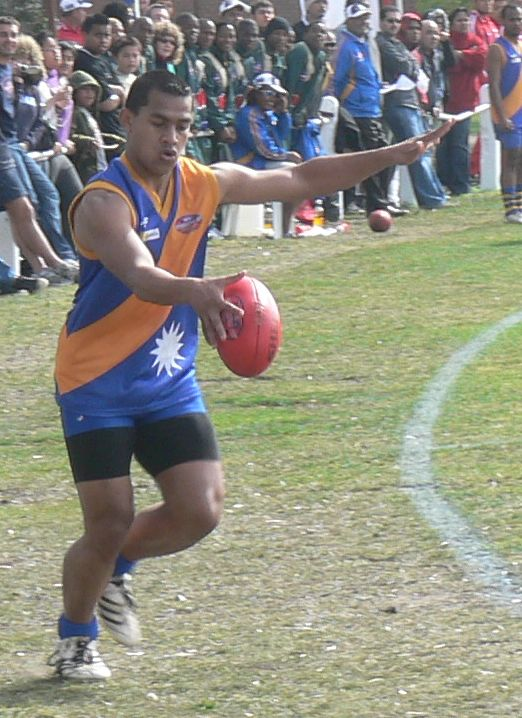
Action from the 2008 Australian Football International Cup featuring Nauruan player kicking a Sherrin

Australian rules football in Nauru is the national sport. In Australia, the AFL is the most attended professional football competition.

There are currently organised open age leagues in seven nations (including Australia) around the Pacific, while in at least four other nations there have been participation in the sport. The sport is broadcast on television in most of these countries, particularly the AFL Grand Final, however outside of Australia (where it receives record breaking broadcast rights) and New Zealand it is only broadcast on satellite television or cable television.

Open age sides compete in the Australian Football International Cup. South Pacific Under 19s sides have a pathway through AFL Queensland known as the South Pacific High-Performance Pathway via affiliated Academy club sides (Brisbane Lions and Gold Coast Suns Academies). Junior teams compete in the Oceania Cup (2009) in which eight pacific nations have participated. From 2010 a South Pacific representative team participated in Division 2 of the AFL Under 16 Championships.

Some players from the Pacific region have become notable for playing in the elite Australian Football League however to date Papua New Guinea and New Zealand are the only countries from which players have been directly recruited. Players from other countries have been offered scholarships.

== History ==
Australian football began in Australia and also spread to New Zealand in the 19th century, however it was no longer played by the time of the First World War, the currently existing leagues having been founded in the 1970s.

The Australian Football International Cup competition began 2002 open to all Australian Football playing countries except Australia. It has been held every three years since and has included many teams from the region. Papua New Guinea and New Zealand being the most successful of the region.

A bid was made to include Australian football as an event in 2007 South Pacific Games which was hosted by Fiji, however it failed to qualify due to not qualifying the number of participating nations.

== Australia ==
Australian rules is one of the most popular sports in Australia and has over 800,000 players.

It is home to the professional Australian Football League competition which is the most attended sporting league in the country and is also home to leagues in every state and territory as well as women's leagues, amateur leagues, junior leagues and recreational leagues .

=== External territories ===
All external territories of Australia have some history of the sport at an amateur level. Auskick programs have been introduced by AFL players on both Christmas Island and the Cocos (Keeling) Islands.

== Fiji ==
Fiji has produced several professional players for the Australian Football League, however organised Australian rules did not begin there until 2009.

The governing body for the sport on the islands is AFL Fiji, created in 2009.

=== History in Fiji ===
An Australian rules exhibition was held at Suva in 1963. In 1965, St Kilda Football Club returned to Fiji as part of a proposed biennial end of season trip, but declined to further promote the game there.

The first television broadcasts of matches by the Australia Network began in 2002. In the period 2004–2008, a proposal for a serious ongoing Australian Rules football competition was mooted by former Fiji Police Commissioner, Andrew Hughes. Hughes had played footy at various amateur levels in Australia and was keen to promote it when he arrived in Fiji to take up his post as the nation's top cop. In mid-2004, Hughes, based in Suva, called a meeting within the Fiji police force of officers interested in assisting with his vision of using the force itself as the basis for developing and promoting a local footy competition. According to one who was present at that initial meeting in the Police Officers Mess, ‘Hughes himself was to be the trainer and teacher’ of the new code. A second meeting was held in Lautoka for interested officers based in the West. According to the Police Public Relations Officer at the time, Mesake Koroi, ‘many top rugby players joined in and it started off well, but there was no one except Hughes to run the [programme], so it was hard because, of course, he had other police work to attend to’. This then was the first effort to establish the sport in Fiji. The Fijian Australian Football Association was formed as a governing body but the sheer weight of workload for Hughes meant the FAFA went into recess without creating an organised league. (A failed bid was made for inclusion of the sport into the 2007 South Pacific Games held in Fiji.). Meanwhile, the Western Bulldogs became the first AFL club to actively scouting for recruits in Fiji. This project was later announced to begin with open trials in Suva and Labasa in October of that year 2004. 16 year-old Solomon Loki and 19 year-old Inoke Ratu were added to the Western Bulldogs International scholarship lists. They were not able to take up their offers regrettably because of visa obstructions arising out of Fiji's 2006 coup.

Additionally, in early 2005, representatives the Fiji Daily Post (FDP) newspaper (Alan Hckling publisher; Mesake Koroi then general manager; and editor Robert Wolfgramm), met with Police Commissioner Hughes to alert him of their interest in promoting the code and to work with other like-minded locals and expats by giving publicity to footy through the newspaper. As the 2005 pre-season began, Melbourne-based footy enthusiast, Lex Neander, began filing match summaries for the FDP. His column soon turned into a weekly full page run every Tuesday which continued until the end of the 2008 Australian footy season.

In 2008 meanwhile, pushing footy in Fiji then fell to Fiji-born, David Rodan jnr, the professional player who began with Richmond but was then with Port Adelaide football club. David had long expressed an interest in bringing the code to Fiji and was anointed the AFL's official ambassador for the code. In 2008 his plans were shared with fellow Port Adelaide recruit, Alipate Carlile, and physical education teacher and wife-to-be, Carla Di Pasquale. Together they explored the possibility of Port Adelaide football club joining with him to re-establish the code here in Fiji by means of a new body - ‘AFL Fiji’. In a historic presentation to the PA football club, the Rodan-led trio outlined a proposed logo, a playing strip, and a timeline for establishing the code in Fiji. The trio also outlined where the Hughes initiative failed, and proposed a strategy for future success. The AFL accepted the grand design of his vision and partnered Rodan's initiative with their representative, Andrew Cadzow, who was overseeing "AFL Asia-Pacific" in Brisbane.

In July 2009, Andrew arrived at Suva's Holiday Inn on behalf of the AFL with a brief to develop a plan and establish a steering committee to drive the Rodan-inspired vision into reality. The chief question because Rodan was still playing footy in Australia, was who on the ground would take the interest in footy to concretise it, give it substance, make it work. In response to a newspaper advertisement, fifteen Fiji locals turned up on the July 10th and 11th to hear what Andrew cadzow proposed. Apologies to the meeting were received from David Rodan snr, David Rodan jnr, Carla Di Pasquale, John and Marilyn (from Levuka homestay), and Mareta (from Iwala Events). But among those present were Peter Fulcher, Damian Ames and Pam, Nemani and Biri Rokobuli, Lia Ratu and son Inoke, Vasenai Loki and son Solo, Caroline Narruhn and son Joseph, and Lupe Wolfgramm and her sons, Max and Dylan (who had playing experience as juniors in Melbourne beforehand). From this formative group, Damian Ames was appointed inaugural Chairman. Pam, the Rokobuli and Loki families, as well as Caroline Narruhn were nominated to the Steering Committee.

During the meeting, Cadzow also outlined a future for an "AFL Fiji" that could potentially involve a calendar of events packed with school programmes, talent searches, Auskick/Fijikick rollouts, the presence of a youth ambassador, corporate sponsorships, and participation in Oceania and International Cup championships – all to be overseen by a structured AFL Fiji steering committee and advisory board. The immediate aim was to get up and running, organized and operational, by September 2009, with an official AFL Fiji launch in October as part of the inaugural David Rodan Cup Under 16s competition. That inter-school competition would serve as a filter for local players to join a new national team to compete in December 2009, in an inaugural Under 16s Oceania Cup championships hosted in Fiji.

After the AFL creation of the "AFL Oceania" in Australia in 2008, Fiji was identified as a major target for Australian rules football development in the region. AFL Fiji's formation in mid-2009, by the creation of national committee. In August (2009), Dylan Wolfgramm was selected to be Fiji's representative in an Oceania Under 23 team to play exhibition matches in Cairns on the occasion of the sitting of the Pacific Islands Forum there. Kevin Rudd and other leaders were present to witness the Mal Michael-coached Oceania team win a match against a North Queensland representative side. In September (2009) a newly formed AFL Fiji Steering Committee met at the Holiday Inn and comprised: Tony Moore, Jordan Moore, Lupe Wolfgramm, Max Wolfgramm, Dylan Wolfgramm, Inoke Ratu, Lia Ratu, Solo Loki, Vasenai Loki, Damian Ames, Alex Hales (from the Fiji Daily Post), Caroline Narruhn, Joseph Narruhn, David Rodan Snr, David Rodan Jnr, and Carla Di Pasquale. The meeting settled dates for a forthcoming official launch of AFL Fiji and to set dates for and inaugural "David Rodan Cup" and inter-Pacific "Oceania Cup". ‘Super-clinics’ were also planned at Marist, Grammar, Dudley, Cathedral, International, Laucala Bay and Gospel secondary schools, along with training of development officers necessary for completing the preparatory skilling tasks. Volunteers were assigned for finding sponsorships, game venues, and maintaining the media profile of AFL Fiji.

In the second week of October 2009, the AFL's Andrew Cadzow arrived and co-launched "AFL Fiji". Coinciding with this, Chris Maple and others from the Western Bulldogs Football Club had begun running footy clinics and searches at various locations around Fiji. “With their rugby background they’re used to physical contact, they’re athletic, and from what I’ve seen today they’re very hard working – all the traits needed for AFL football,” Maple told Dale Carruthers, a Canadian journalist attached to the Fiji Daily Post newspaper. New AFL Fiji chairman, Damian Ames, also told the newspaper that Fiji was an ideal ground for introducing the code - “It’s an untapped source of athletes,” Ames said. But the major challenges of introducing the code Damian admitted was that “rugby is so entrenched here [in Fiji].” Ames, Cadzow and other supporters attended and co-supervised clinics held at Suva Grammar School on 14 October, and later at Marist Brothers, while Bulldog representatives Maple and crew were at Yat Sen School doing their talent search.

Following these first tentative steps to gauge local interest, on Friday 16 October 2009, AFL Fiji was modestly, officially and publicly launched with about thirty in attendance in the Banyan Room at Suva's Holiday Inn. Australia's High Commissioner, James Batley, kindly accepted my invitation to do the honours with best wishes for the future. Three days later, 19 October, the Diwali Day public holiday, Fiji "first footy carnival" leading to the "David Rodan Cup" was held. At the end of round-robin matches, the inaugural cup was awarded to Laucala Bay Secondary College, with Runners Up Suva Grammar School; and 3rd Place to Cathedral Secondary School, with 4th Place: Gospel High School. From these four teams, a "Fiji Power" squad was picked to contest the forthcoming inaugural "Oceania Cup" to be held in December (2009). The squad was named as: Laijiasa Bolenaivalu, Fuata Silisoma, Ropate Tobe, Darryll Arthur-Valentine, Jonathan Chongkit, Jiuta Vateitei, Viliame Tuni, Esekia Gibbons, Joeli Logavatu, Gabriel Ledua, Eroni Niumataiwalu, Anasa Yabaki, Wilson Kacivi, Penisoni Tuiova, Richard Niulevu, Semisi Apakuki, Sisa Qarikau, Kinivuwai Nanovo, Paula Rokotuiloma, Samuela Delai, Semi Tikoitoga, Titus Raihman, Ledua Tuberi, Mesake Dakai, Yabaki Cakautini, John Tuivanuakula, Solo Ratu, Dylan Wolfgramm, and Luke Gucake.

The inaugural ‘Under 16 Oceania Cup’ was held at Cathedral Secondary School grounds, 11–13 December (2009). Nauru, New Zealand, Samoa, Tonga and Fiji teams competed. In blustery weather, the fiercely but fairly contested Cup went to Tonga. All Pacific teams would head to Tonga in 2010. In the meantime, footy clinics were conducted in schools around the Suva-Nausori area with training sessions organised weekly at Albert Park in downtown Suva.

In 2010, a schools tournament was held, with more than 80 students from 14 different schools in Suva and Nausori represented in six teams that played round robin matches. The "Fiji Power" national team made its first appearance at the Under 16 Oceania Cup in Tonga in December 2010.

A senior team entered the 2011 Australian Football International Cup and were highly successful, taking the Division 2 title after dominating the Grand Final against France.

A local league with four teams (Nausori Cats, Raiwaqa Bulldogs, Suva City Swans and Suva Lions) has since commenced.

In October 2022, the Australian government announced its commitment to a support package for the sport in Fiji.

=== Notable players ===
==== Men's ====
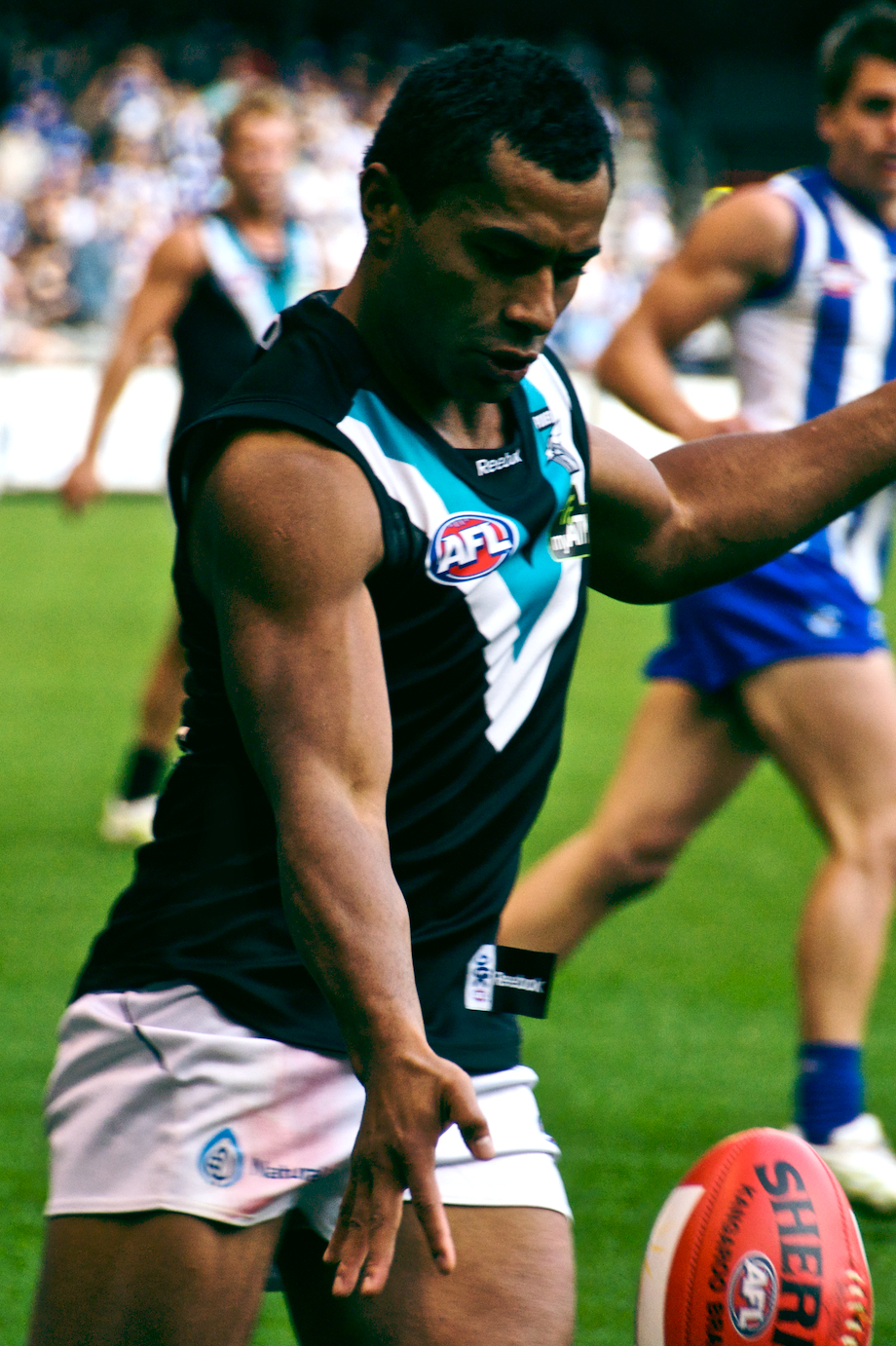
David Rodan Fijian born games record holder and AFL umpire playing for Port Adelaide in 2011

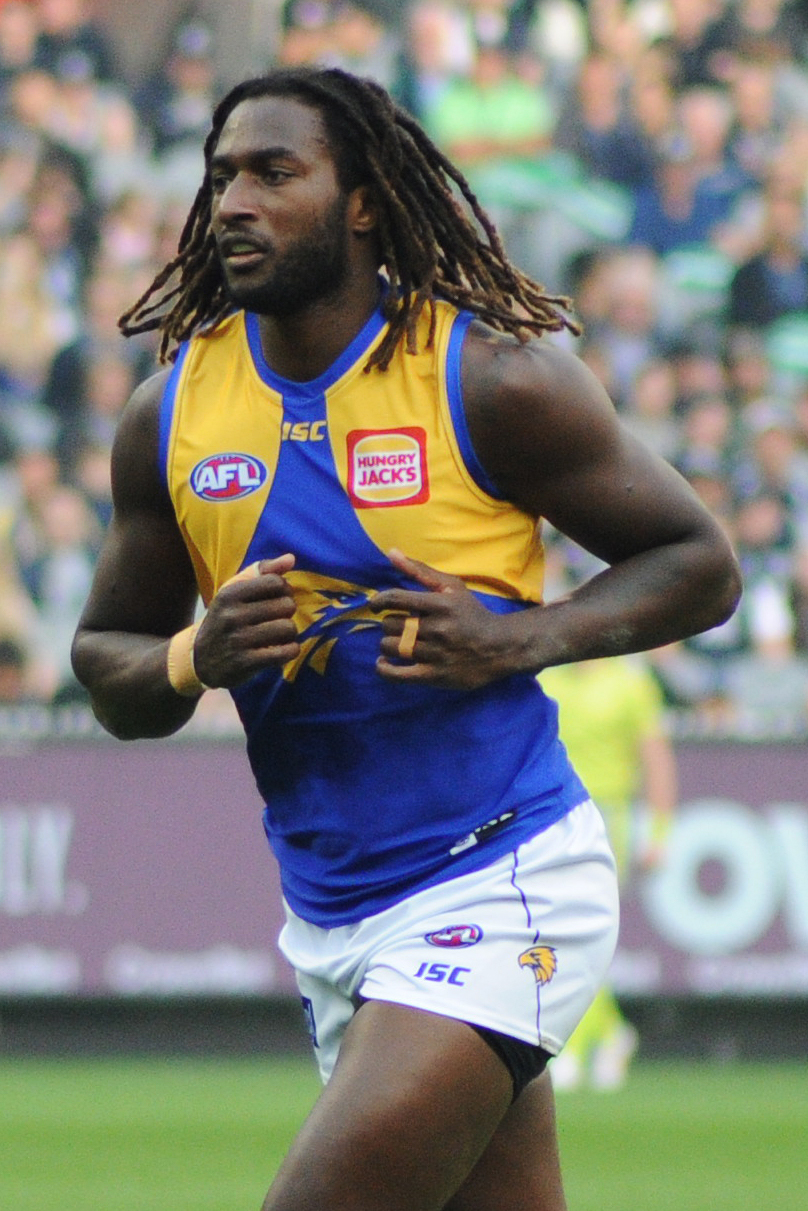
Nic Natainui playing for West Coast in 2018

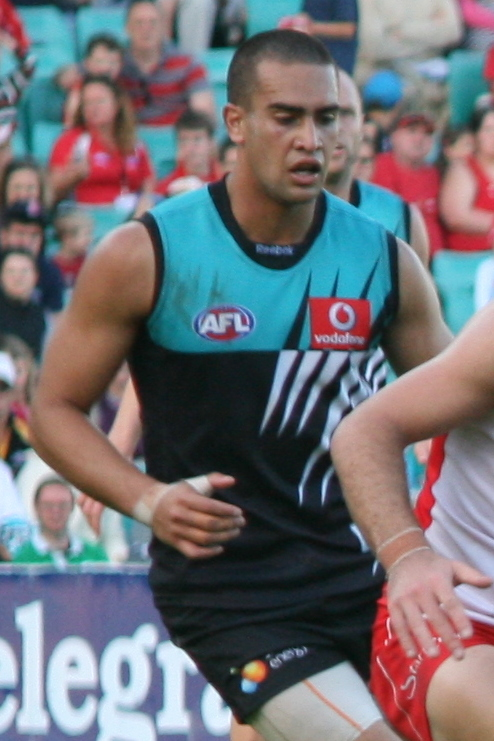
Alipate Carlile playing for Port Adelaide in 2009

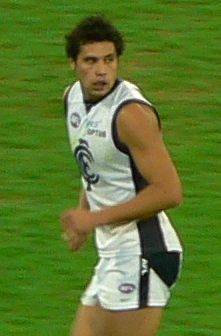
Setanta O'Hailpin playing for Carlton in 2008

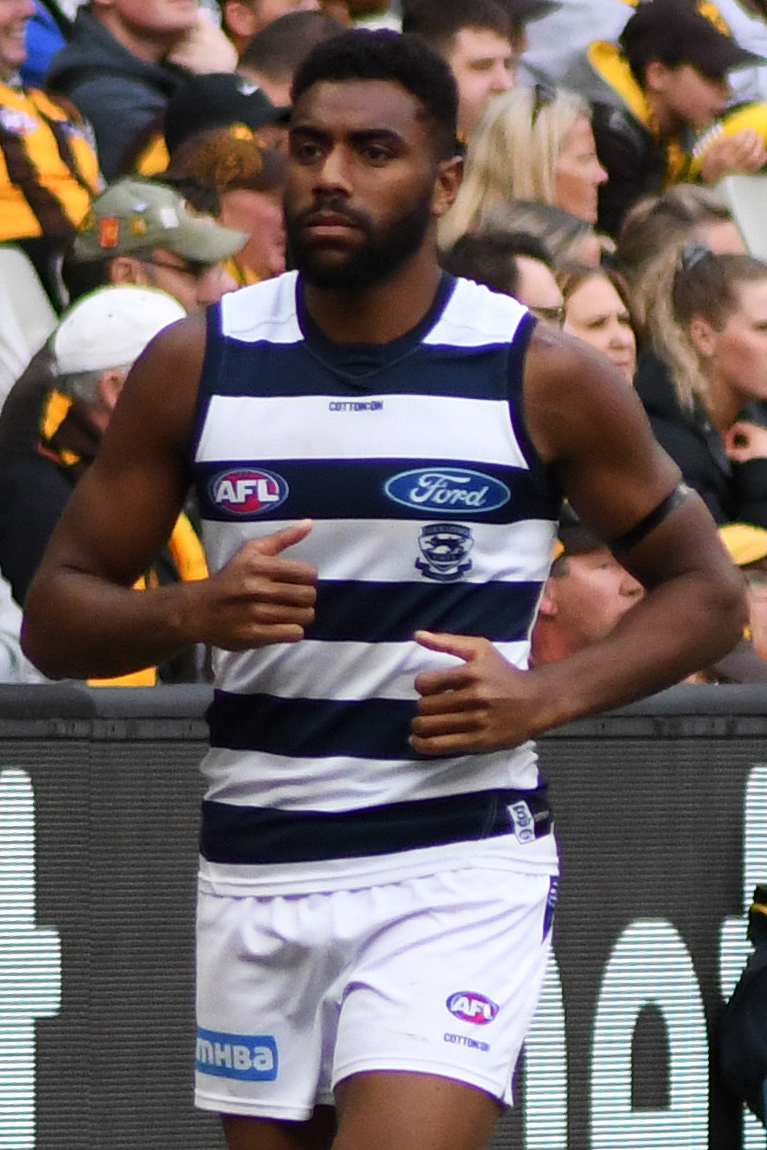
Esava Ratugolea playing for Geelong in 2019

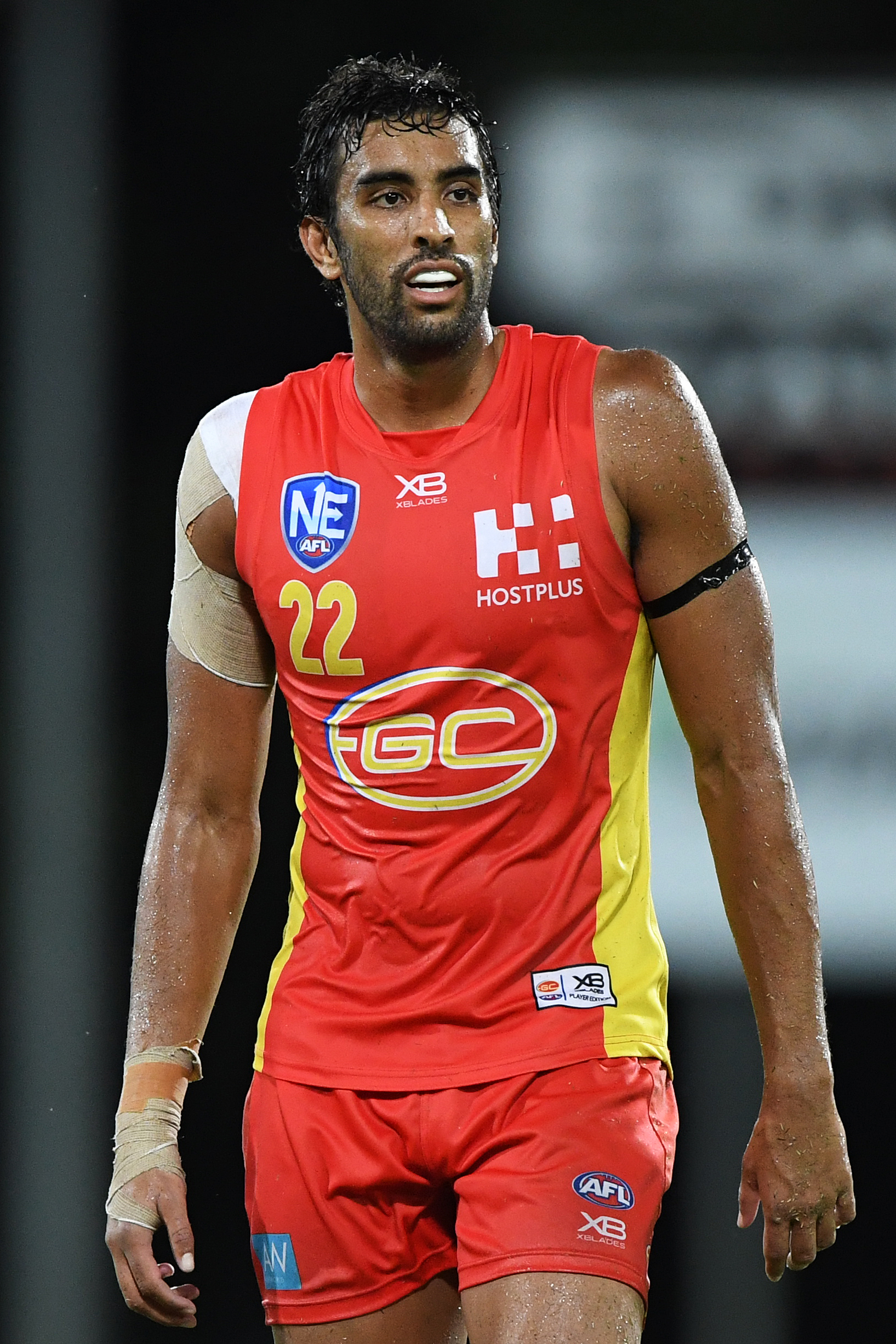
Tom Nicholls playing for Gold Coast in 2019

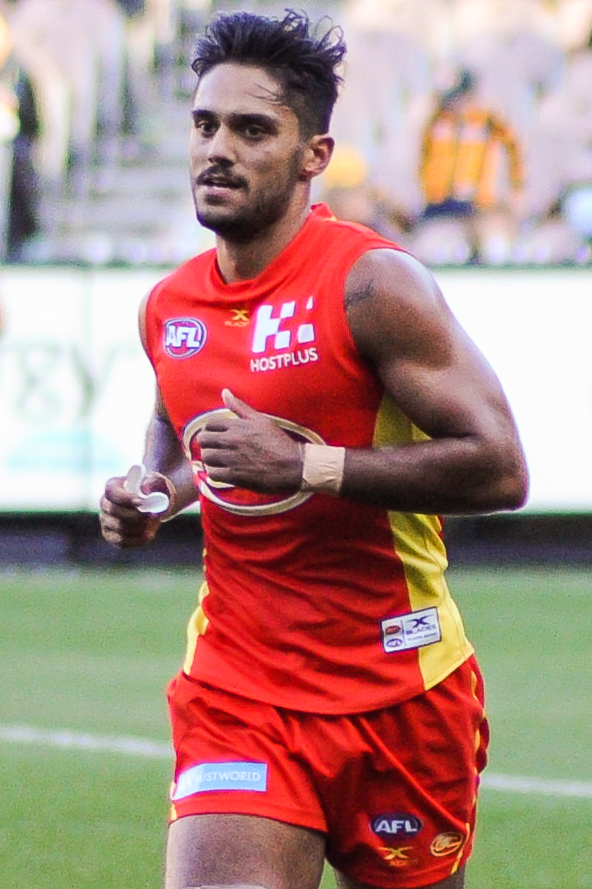
Aaron Hall playing for Gold Coast in 2017

Currently on an AFL senior list

Player	Connection to Fiji	AFL Years*	AFL Matches*	AFL Goals*
Atu Bosenavulagi	Born	2019-	11	1
Esava Ratugolea	Parents	2017-	59	38
Nathan Freeman	Parent	2014-2018	2	1
Aaron Hall	Mother	2012-	147	93
Tom Nicholls	Mother	2011-	45	7
Nic Naitanui	Parents	2009 -	213	112
Alipate Carlile	Born, mother	2006-2017	167	5
Setanta Ó hAilpín	Mother (Rotuman)	2005 - 2013	88	82
Aisake Ó hAilpín	Mother	2004-2008	-	-
David Rodan	Born, to Fijian-born Tongan mother and Tongan father	2002 - 2013	185	131
Wes Fellowes	Mother	1981–1989	102	28
Charlie Moore	Born	1897–1899	30	34

==== Women's ====
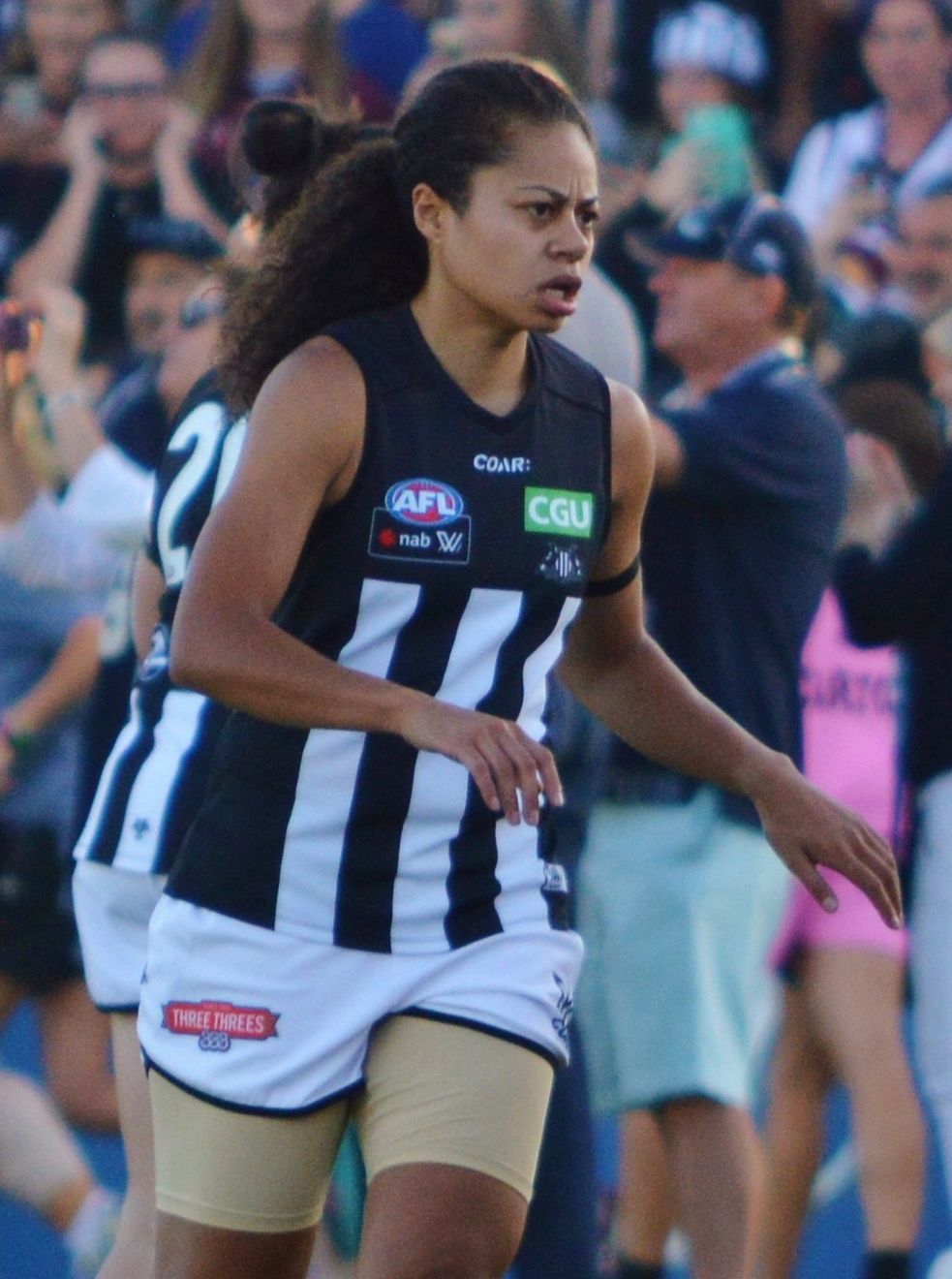
Helen Roden playing for Collingwood in 2017

Currently on an AFLW senior list

Player	Connection to Fiji	AFLW Years*	AFLW Matches*	AFLW Goals*
Helen Roden	Born	2017	1	0

== Nauru ==
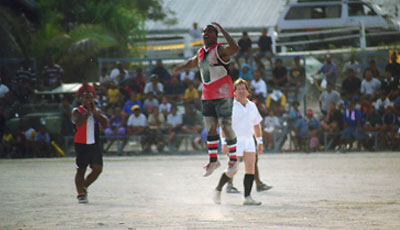
Action from Linkbelt stadium, Nauru

Australian rules football in Nauru dates back to the 1910s and quickly established itself as the national sport of the country.

== New Caledonia ==
Social football has been played in Nouméa by Australian, French and New Zealander expats since around 2008.

== New Zealand ==
The sport was introduced first introduced to New Zealand in the 1860s but has gone through extended periods of hiatus since then. New Zealand sent touring teams to Australia including a Maori tour in 1888 and the 1908 Melbourne Carnival. The modern competition emerged in 1974 and the game is currently governed by the New Zealand Australian Football League, there are more than five organised competitions located in various regions across the country including Auckland; Canterbury; Wellington; Waikato; Otago, Queenstown and a four-team national competition with a national draft has been contested at the North Harbour Stadium in Auckland since 2016. The national team, The Hawks, have competed against Australian representatives sides at junior level and were crowned International champions in 2005.

== Papua New Guinea ==
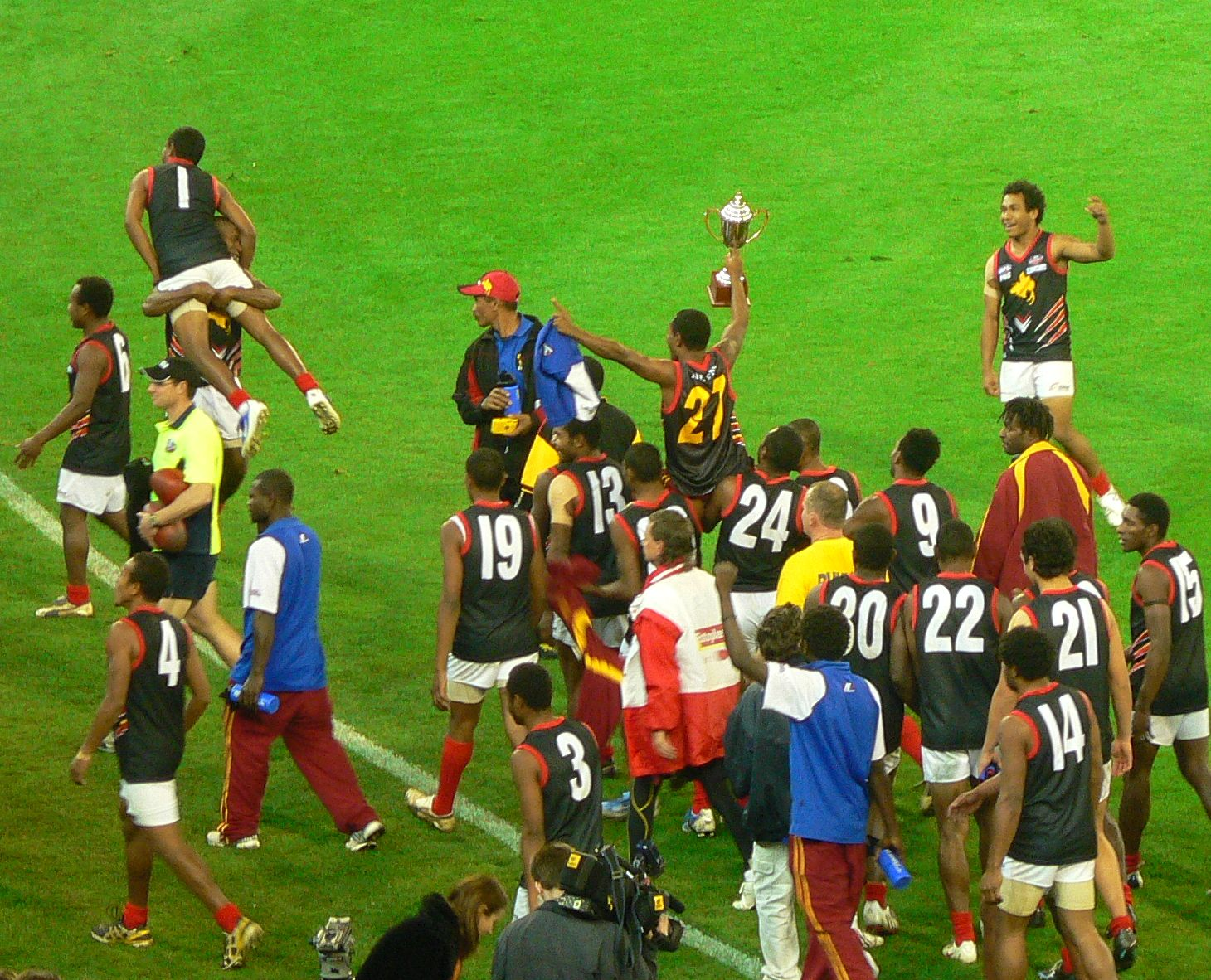
Papua New Guinea's Mosquitos celebrate taking the International Cup from New Zealand to become International champions in 2008

Papua New Guinea has the largest number of registered Australian rules footballers outside Australia, with senior and junior competitions in most major population centres. With a large depth of players PNG is a consistently strong performer in international competition having competed in all AFL International Cups as a grand finalist. The sport in PNG is controlled by the PNG Rules Football Council.

== Samoa ==
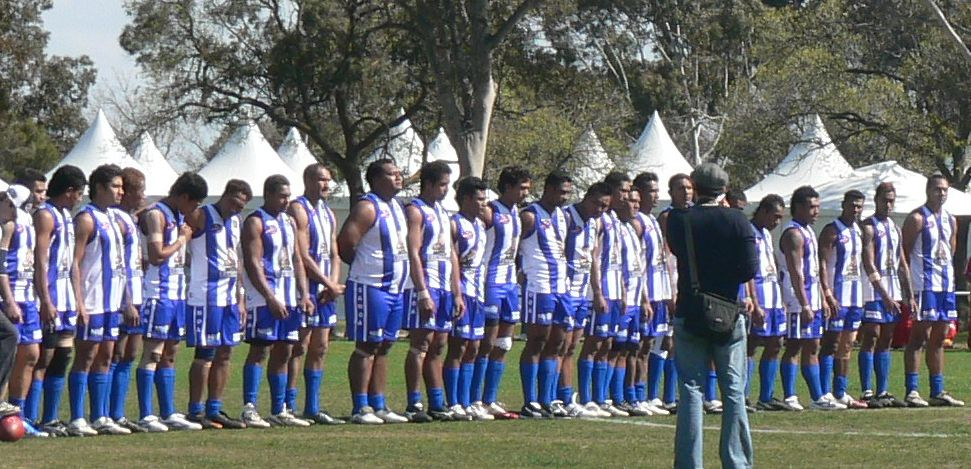
Samoans line up for the national anthem at the 2008 Australian Football International Cup.

Australian rules football in Samoa has been played since 1997. The national team, known as the Bulldogs first competed at the Arafura Games in 1998. There is a full-time development officer funded by AusAid, a junior development program and a schoolboy's tournament. Samoa has competed in all AFL International Cups except 2011 achieving mid placed rankings.

== Solomon Islands ==
Australian rules football was first played in the Solomon Islands in 2003 with some junior clinics held by Garry McKenzie and members of the Australian Defence Force, stationed in the country to help restore order after years of civil unrest. The first AGM of the Solomon Islands Australian Football Association was held in August 2004 at the National Sports Centre, with around 100 people attending, almost all being locals. The committee was elected and subsequently met to discuss plans for developing the code, especially for 12- to 18-year-olds. By the end of 2004 there were two senior teams playing friendly matches and around 150 juniors had participated in games.

Since 2004, junior clinics have been held regularly in Honiara, and the Solomon Islands' first representative squad will compete at the AFL Oceania Under 18 Championships in December 2010.

A youth development officer will be working in cricket and Australian rules development in the islands from 2011.

== Tonga ==
Australian rules football in Tonga has been played since 2003, when the Tonga Australian Football Association was founded. A schools competition has been played yearly since then, including a tour to Samoa and the national team has competed against the Fitzroy Reds amateur team from Australia. In its debut appearance at the 2011 AFL International Cup Tonga finished a highly credible ninth position out of 18 competing countries.

== Vanuatu ==
Australian rules football has been played in Vanuatu since 2006, when AFL Queensland volunteers from Gold Coast set up a Rec Footy competition. The program expanded in 2008 to include an Auskick junior development program later branded as "Pikinini Kick".

The AFL Vanuatu was formally created in 2010, and nominated five Vanuatu local youths to compete at the Under 16s Oceania Cup, to be held in Tonga in December 2010.

== Oceanian performance at International Cup ==
Flag	Nation	Team/Nickname	2002	2005	2008	2011	2011	2017
(Fiji)	Fiji	Tribe	-	-	-	12th	10th	8th
(New Zealand)	New Zealand	Hawks	3rd	1st	2nd	4th	3rd	2nd
(Nauru)	Nauru	Chiefs	8th	-	5th	6th	7th	5th
(Papua New Guinea)	Papua New Guinea	Mosquitos	2nd	2nd	1st	2nd	1st	1st
(Samoa)	Samoa	Kangaroos	7th	5th	10th	-	-	-
(Tonga)	Tonga	Tigers	-	-	-	9th	6th	-

== List ==
- AFL Pacific Cup
- Australian rules football in Australia
  - Australian rules football in the Australian Capital Territory
  - Australian rules football in New South Wales
  - Australian rules football in the Northern Territory
  - Australian rules football in Queensland
  - Australian rules football in South Australia
  - Australian rules football in Tasmania
  - Australian rules football in Victoria
  - Australian rules football in Western Australia
- Australian rules football in Fiji
- Australian rules football in Nauru
- Australian rules football in New Caledonia (see Australian rules football in France)
- Australian rules football in New Zealand
- Australian rules football in Papua New Guinea
- Australian rules football in Samoa
- Australian rules football in the Solomon Islands
- Australian rules football in Tonga
- Australian rules football in Vanuatu

== See also ==
- Cricket in Oceania
