= Oceania Cup (disambiguation) =

Oceania Cup may refer to:

- Oceania Cup (Australian rules football), youth Aussie rules tournament
- Men's Oceania Cup, the men's field hockey tournament
- Women's Oceania Cup, the women's field hockey tournament
- ITTF-Oceania Cup, the table tennis competition
- Oceania Sevens, the rugby sevens competition
- OFC Nations Cup, the football (soccer) tournament
- FORU Oceania Cup, the rugby union competition
- 1997 Oceania Cup, a rugby league competition
- Oceania Cup (rugby league), a rugby league competition
- 2019 Oceania Cup (field hockey), a hockey competition
