= Fearghal Purcell =

Irish Australian rules and Gaelic footballer

Personal information
- Born: 26 June 1980 (age 46) Dublin

Sport
- Sport: Gaelic football

Fearghal Purcell is an Irish former sportsperson. He played Gaelic football for the Dublin county team, and was also an Australian rules footballer.

== Playing career ==
Purcell is a former member of the Dublin senior squad. He currently plays for UTS Australian Football Club and represented the Ireland national Australian rules football team, that won the 2011 Australian Football International Cup. He kicked six goals in the tournament, including one goal in the final against Papua New Guinea.
