= Gerard Walls =

Antrim Gaelic footballer

Personal information
- Born: 4 June 1982 (age 44) Antrim, Northern Ireland
- Height: 6 ft 3 in (191 cm)

Sport
- Sport: Gaelic football
Clubs
- Years: Club
- Lámh Dhearg; Moorabbin Kangaroos; Belfast Redbacks
Inter-county
- Years: County
- 2009–2010: Antrim

Gerard "Ger" Walls is a former Gaelic footballer who played for the Antrim county team.

== Playing career ==
The Lámh Dhearg clubman represented Antrim at all levels. He was called up to the senior panel in 2009. He played in the Dr McKenna Cup and NFL in 2010. He represented the Ireland national Australian rules football team, that won the 2010 European Championships in Australian Football and the 2011 Australian Football International Cup. He was one of Ireland's best on ground in the final and kicked three goals in the tournament. He currently plays for Moorabbin Kangaroos in the Southern Football League in Victoria
