= Nauru national Australian rules football team =

Nauru
- Nickname(s): The Chiefs

Rankings
- Current: 5th (as of October 2022)

First international
- Nauru 5 - 24 Papua New Guinea (1976)

International Cup
- Appearances: 5 (first in 2002)
- Best result: 5th (2008, 2017)

The Nauru national Australian rules football team represents Nauru in Australian rules football. Despite its small size and population, Nauru, which is the only country with Australian football as its national sport, consistently ranks among the top eight teams in the world.

The men's team, nicknamed the Chiefs, debuted in 1976 and finished 5th at the 2008 Australian Football International Cup. A women's team, nicknamed the Aoreni, debuted at the 2024 Pacific Cup which it won. Male and female youth sides, nicknamed the Stars, have also competed regularly since 2009.

== History ==
Australian rules had been played on Pleasant Island as early as 1916 with regular competition between local teams from 1921. As an Australian trustee, Nauru was the only overseas league recognised and supported by the Australian National Football Council in 1929. By 1954 its popularity had grown such that it became the only football code that children played on the island.

Following Nauru’s independence in 1968 and the independence of the Australian territory of Papua New Guinea in 1975, an opportunity presented itself for a Nauruan national team to compete. The nation's first internationals occurred when the team toured Papua New Guinea a year later in 1976. Among the better players in the squad were Royong Itsimaera, Ali Iwagia, Johaness Itsimaera, Richardo Solomon, Vinson Detenamo, Manfred Depaune and Pres Nimes. Papua New Guinea went on to win the match by 129 points.

Until sometime after 1999, the team went by the nickname the Frigatebirds. In 2000, Nauru travelled to Queensland to compete in the inaugural Web Sports Cup. The side played against a team from Samoa and the Robina Roos of the AFL Queensland. Nauru won both matches. The team returned to Australia for the competition again the following year, this time defeating another two teams, including the Gold Coast Old Boys.

In November 2012 Nauru travelled to Suva to take on Fiji in a three-match test series. Nauru won the first two matches by a combined 140 points. The team re-asserted its dominance in the final match, securing the sweep with a 103 to 31 win. This test series was the first official AFL international ever held outside of Australia.

The women's team on debut. The Under 17 male side also won the cup. The men's side reached the grand final.

== Players ==
Despite the sport's popularity and the national team's success, as of 2017 no Nauruan international has played in the Australian Football League. However, in 2008 seventeen Nauruan players competed in the Victorian Football League in preparation for the 2008 Australian Football International Cup. In 2012 Yoshi Harris played a few matches for Greater Western Sydney Giants's reserve squad and in the AFL Sydney. Though shorter in stature than the average AFL player, Nauruans are fast and athletic. Not a single player in the 2008 International Cup squad was over 183cm. Because of this height, the Nauruan style is to play close to the ground and is suited to playing in wet conditions.

== Stadium ==
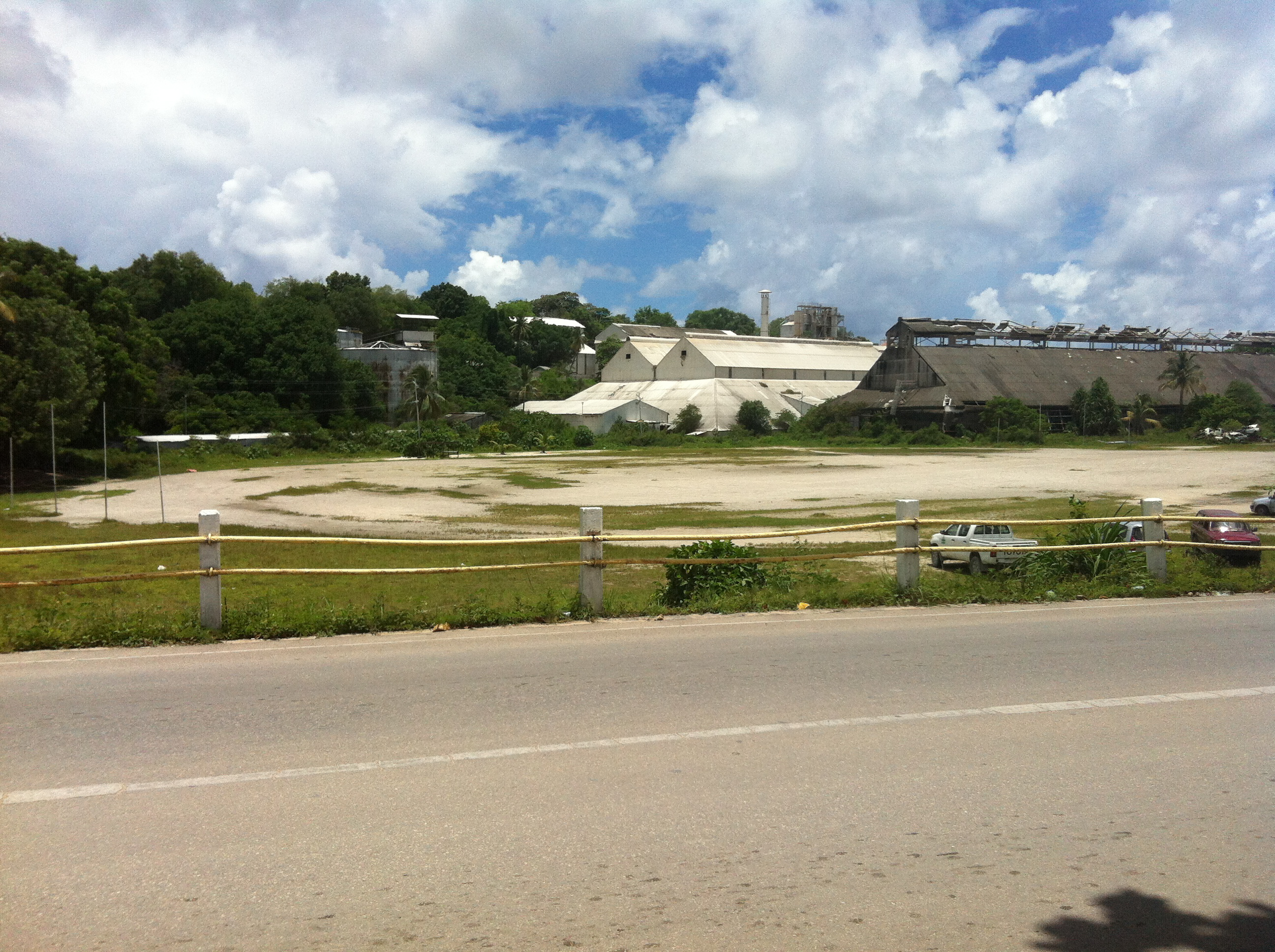
View of the Linkbelt Oval in 2012. Phosphate processing facilities can be seen in the background.

As the only Australian rules ground on Nauru, the Linkbelt Oval in the Aiwo District is home to the sport on the island. However, because the pitch surface is rock and phosphate dust, and markings are drawn on the rock with oil, the ground does not meet standards for international matches. In April 2024, the Australian Defence Force visited the island and were surprised by the playing surface. At that time, the government of Australia was attempting to build Nauru a second field with a grass surface through the Australian Aid so the country could host other national teams and international competition. Other clubs and nations would not travel to Nauru previously because of the oval's surface.

== Men's team ==
The men's team, the Chiefs formed debuted in 1976.

=== International Cup ===
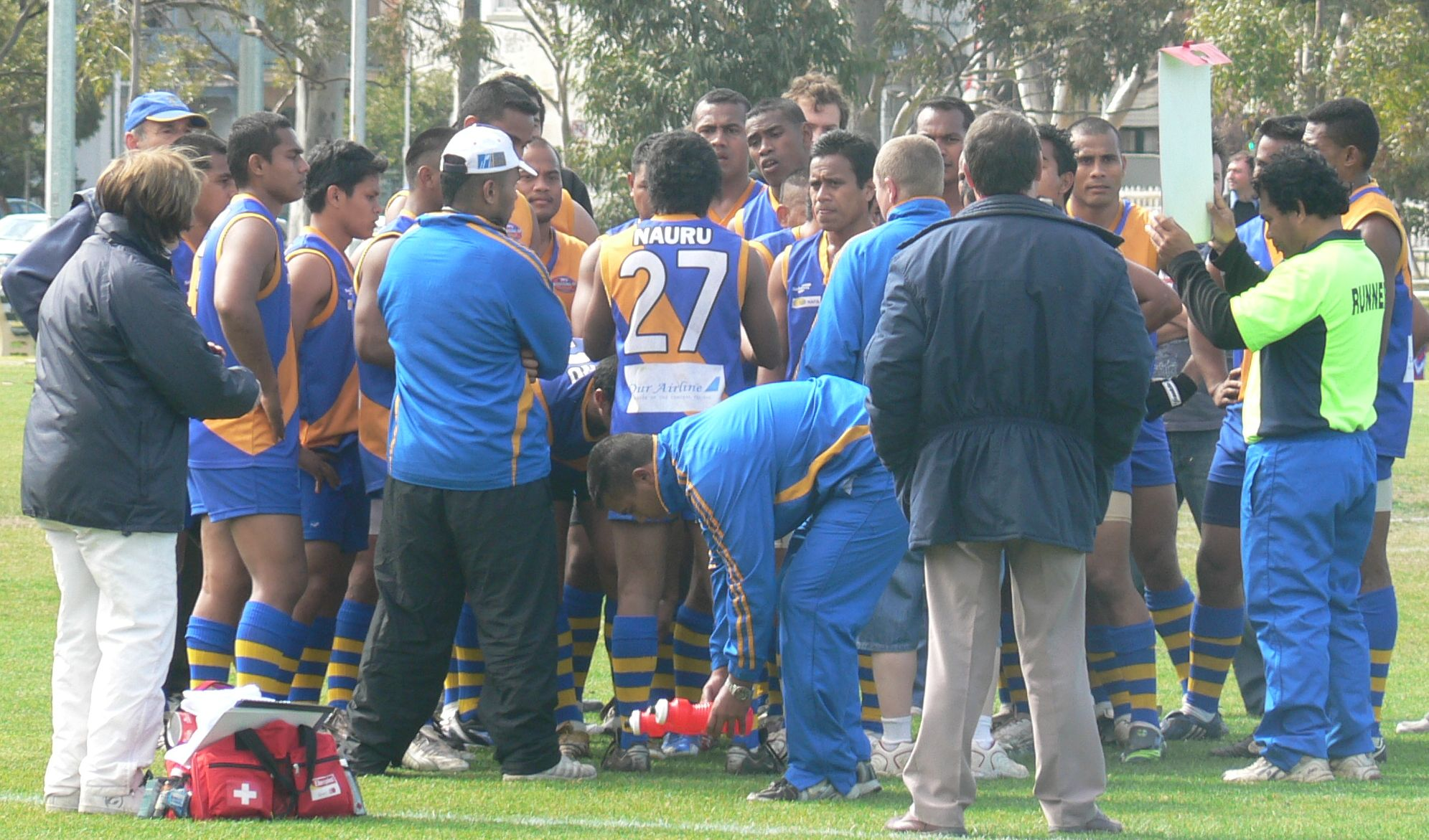
The Chiefs quarter time huddle at the 2008 International Cup in Melbourne, Victoria

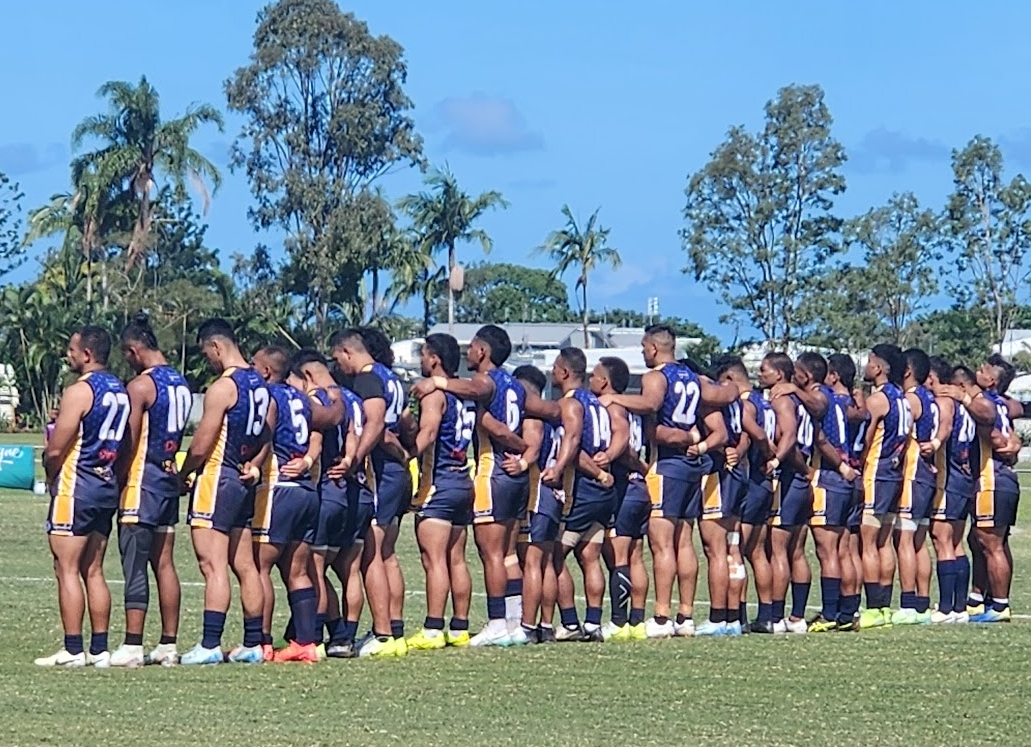
Nauru men's team line up for the national anthem at 2024 Pacific Cup at Maroochydore Queensland

Nauru has participated in the Australian Football International Cup since the inaugural tournament in 2002. They have gone on to compete in every edition of the tournament, aside from 2005 when the team had to withdraw because of financial difficulties shortly before the games started.

International Cup results
Year	Finish	P	W-L-D	PF	PA
2002	8/11	6	1-5-0	269	247
2005	Withdrew				
2008	5/16	5	4-1-0	387	166
2011	6/18	6	4-2-0	312	238
2014	7/18	5	4-1-0	419	170
2017	5/18	5	4-1-0	232	235

=== Arafura Games ===
Nauru competed in the 1995 Arafura Games in Darwin, the first edition of the tournament to feature national teams. That year they were coached by former Geelong Football Club player Mark Yeates. Nauru went on to win the bronze medal that year. The Chiefs went on to win the tournament in 2001, defeating the Northern Territory Eagles in the final. The team did not compete in 1997 or 1999 despite national teams competing in the sport at those games.

Arafura Games results
Year	Finish	P	W-L-D	PF	PA
1995	3/5	5	2-3-0	233	236
1997	Did Not Enter				
1999	Did Not Enter				
2001	1/4	3	3-0-0	307	81

=== Pacific Cup ===
Following several failed attempts to hold an AFL International Cup because of the covid-19 pandemic, the AFL announced in 2024 that it would discontinue the tournament in favor of regional tournaments. Nauru would then compete in the inaugural edition of the AFL Pacific Cup, the first official AFL tournament since 2017. In the tournament, the Chiefs finished second, falling to Papua New Guinea in the final.

AFL Pacific Cup results
Year	Finish	P	W-L-D	PF	PA
2024	2/5	4	2-0-2	151	187

=== Matches ===
Date	Opposition	For	Against	Venue	Winner	Status	Ref.
11 October 1976	Papua New Guinea	5	24	Sir Hubert Murray Stadium, Port Moresby	Papua New Guinea	Friendly	
1995	New Zealand	19	54	Marrara Oval, Darwin, Australia	New Zealand	1995 Arafura Games	
1995	Japan/Singapore	35	41	Marrara Oval, Darwin, Australia	Japan/Singapore	1995 Arafura Games	
1995	Papua New Guinea	30	52	Marrara Oval, Darwin, Australia	Papua New Guinea	1995 Arafura Games	
1995	Hong Kong	65	30	Marrara Oval, Darwin, Australia	Nauru	1995 Arafura Games	
1995	Japan/Singapore	84	59	Marrara Oval, Darwin, Australia	Nauru	1995 Arafura Games (Bronze)	
2001	Japan	142	9	Marrara Oval, Darwin, Australia	Nauru	2001 Arafura Games	
2001	Northern Territory Superules	74	37	Marrara Oval, Darwin, Australia	Nauru	2001 Arafura Games	
2001	Northern Territory Eagles	91	35	Marrara Oval, Darwin, Australia	Nauru	2001 Arafura Games (Gold)	
14 August 2002	Japan	119	14	Warrawee Park, Oakleigh, Australia	Nauru	2002 International Cup	
15 August 2002	Great Britain (United Kingdom)	59	65	Elsternwick Park, Elsternwick, Australia	Great Britain	2002 International Cup	
16 August 2002	Denmark	27	40	Whitten Oval, Melbourne, Australia	Denmark	2002 International Cup	
21 August 2002	Papua New Guinea	44	91	Trevor Barker Oval, Sandringham, Australia	Papua New Guinea	2002 International Cup	
23 August 2002	Samoa	20	37	Victoria Park, Melbourne, Australia	Samoa	2002 International Cup (7/8)	
27 August 2008	Papua New Guinea	20	69	Ransford Oval, Melbourne, Australia	Papua New Guinea	2008 International Cup	
29 August 2008	Great Britain (United Kingdom)	65	18	Western Oval, Melbourne, Australia	Nauru	2008 International Cup	
1 September 2008	Peres Team for Peace (Israel) (Palestine)	177	7	Walter Oval, Warrnambool, Australia	Nauru	2008 International Cup	
3 September 2008	United States	45	23	Walter Oval, Warrnambool, Australia	Nauru	2008 International Cup	
5 September 2008	Canada	80	49	Ransford Oval, Melbourne, Australia	Nauru	2008 International Cup (5/6)	
13 August 2011	Japan	42	19	Blacktown International Sportspark, Sydney, Australia	Nauru	2011 International Cup	
13 August 2011	Fiji	42	15	Blacktown International Sportspark, Sydney, Australia	Nauru	2011 International Cup	
15 August 2011	Tonga	61	35	Blacktown International Sportspark, Sydney, Australia	Nauru	2011 International Cup	
20 August 2011	Papua New Guinea	27	110	Blacktown International Sportspark, Sydney, Australia	Papua New Guinea	2011 International Cup	
24 August 2011	Denmark	94	7	Ransford Oval, Melbourne, Australia	Nauru	2011 International Cup	
26 August 2011	South Africa	46	52	McAllister Oval, Melbourne, Australia	South Africa	2011 International Cup (5/6)	
16 November 2012	Fiji	147	47	Albert Park, Suva, Fiji	Nauru	Test series	
20 November 2012	Fiji	75	35	Albert Park, Suva, Fiji	Nauru	Test series	
23 November 2012	Fiji	103	31	Albert Park, Suva, Fiji	Nauru	Test series	
10 August 2014	Indonesia	227	7	McAllister Oval, Melbourne, Australia	Nauru	2014 International Cup	
13 August 2014	Great Britain (United Kingdom)	50	29	Ransford Oval, Melbourne, Australia	Nauru	2014 International Cup	
16 August 2014	Ireland (Republic of Ireland)	39	66	Ransford Oval, Melbourne, Australia	Republic of Ireland	2014 International Cup	
19 August 2014	Great Britain (United Kingdom)	49	33	McAlister Oval, Melbourne, Australia	Nauru	2014 International Cup	
22 August 2014	United States	54	35	McAlister Oval, Melbourne, Australia	Nauru	2014 International Cup (7/8)	
6 August 2017	New Zealand	34	81	Ransford Oval, Melbourne, Australia	New Zealand	2017 International Cup	
9 August 2017	Papua New Guinea	35	84	Marty Busch Recreation Reserve, Sebastopol, Australia	Papua New Guinea	2017 International Cup	
12 August 2017	France	106	14	Victoria Oval, Kew, Australia	Nauru	2017 International Cup	
15 August 2017	Canada	56	24	Ransford Oval, Melbourne, Australia	Nauru	2017 International Cup	
18 August 2017	Great Britain (United Kingdom)	53	32	McAlister Oval, Melbourne, Australia	Nauru	2017 International Cup (5/6)	
18 November 2024	New Zealand	50	44	Maroochydore Multi Sports Complex, Maroochydore, Australia	Nauru	2024 AFL Pacific Cup	
20 November 2024	Fiji	55	19	Maroochydore Multi Sports Complex, Maroochydore, Australia	Nauru	2024 AFL Pacific Cup	
21 November 2024	Papua New Guinea	27	62	Maroochydore Multi Sports Complex, Maroochydore, Australia	Papua New Guinea	2024 AFL Pacific Cup	
23 November 2024	Papua New Guinea	19	62	Maroochydore Multi Sports Complex, Maroochydore, Australia	Papua New Guinea	2024 AFL Pacific Cup (Gold)	

=== Squads ===
==== 2002 IC ====
- Coach: Gonzaga Namaduk
- Players: Alfred Spanner, Quinson Cook, Devin Grundler, Jericho Detenamo, Ramaraka Detenamo, Ken Blake, Javin Agir, Rudeen Spanner, Robert Timothy, Linko Jeremiah, Enoch Canon, Joel Joram, Aaron Canon, Paner Baguga, Merlin Taleka, Jaxon Jeremiah, Spencer Tannang, Brian Hiram, George Gioura, Jesse Uepa, Junior Dowiyogo, Raynor Tom, Vaiuli Amoc, Carlson Hartman, Paul Hartman, Xavier Namaduk, Cidro Namaduk, Slim Notte, Bayonet Aliklik, Syd Namaduk, Anthony Hiram

==== 2008 IC ====
- Coach: Manfred Depaune
- Players: Trent Depaune, Priven Dame, Mallinson Batsiua, Agir Amwano, Rudin Spanner, Timothy Teabuge, Deamo Baguga, Clint Engar, Vili-Kesa Jeremiah, Torio Mwareow, George Quadina, Otto Adam, German Grundler, Brendan Waidabu, Ronpade Cook, Johnny Dagiaro, Neil Scotty, Rennier Gadabu, Nash Starr, David Dagiaro, Tiana Waidabu, Shadrach Notte, Pesky Agir, Adolph Muasau, Aronson Eobob, Derrick Seymour

==== 2011 IC ====
- Coach: Graham Pratt
- Assistant Coach: Wes Illig
- Players: Snuka Adire, Derio Namaduk, Febriano Baguga, Jude Cook, Otto Adam, Deiri Cook, Yoshi Harris, Kingston Ika, Maska Hubert, Maverick Batsiua, Johnny Dagiaro, Donatello Moses, Reason Satto, Trent Depaune, Nash Starr, Timothy Teabuge, Ralph Teimitsi, Mallinson Batsiua, Zac Temaki, Jose Uepa, Brendan Waidabu, Tiana Waidabu, Kabureta Dannang, Robroy Grundler, Kamtaura Kamtaura, Robby Deireregea

==== 2014 IC ====
- Coach: Paner Baguga
- Players: Otto Adam, Snuka Adire, Lennox Agege, Jonas Amwano, Mallinson Battsiua, Maverick Battsiua, Kazaam Baui, Ronpade Cook, Charles Dagiaro, Johnny Dagiaro, Pilo Dagiaro, Aykers Daniel, Trent Depaune, Marcus Paul Detenamo, Hess Tekai Fiolape, DJ Grundler, German Grundler, Yoshi Harris, Mikey Hiram, Kingston Ika, Tipung Kamtaura, Donatello Moses, Dave Mwaredaga, Kenneth Oppenheimer, Timothy Teabuge, Zac Temaki, Jose Uepa, Greigor Uera, Tiana Waidabu

==== 2017 IC ====
- Coach: Zac Temaki
- Players: Bronco Deidenang, Yoshi Harris, Kenneth Oppenheimer, Aykers Daniel, Joeson Kanimea, Trent Depaune, Tipung Kamtaura, Donatello Moses, Jencke Jeremiah, Richmond Spanner, Mikey Hiram, Mallinson Batsiua, Darnel Diema, Patrick Agadio, Dave Mwaredaga, Agir Nenabo Amwano, Kais Tatum, German Grundler, Tiana Waidubu, Charles Dagiaro, Jose TripleJ-Jems Uepa, David Japheth Adeang, Jeremiah Gil Kam, Devine Agir, Teolime Kamtaura, Tama Jeremiah, Niga Haulangi, Shawnkemp Maaki, Ishmael Fritz, Mick Vorbach

== Women's team ==
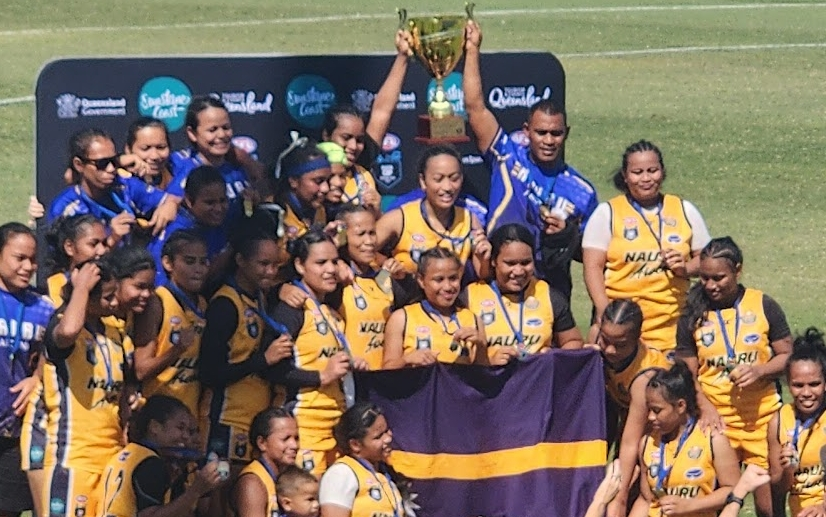
Nauru Aoreni winners of the 2024 Pacific Cup at Maroochydore, Queensland

An open women's team, nicknamed the Aoreni, formed to compete in 2024 winning the Pacific Cup at Maroochydore, Queensland winning on debut.

== Youth sides ==
AFL Nauru also organizes youth sides. The male youth side is nicknamed the Stars. At the under-16 level the nation has experienced much success, including Oceania Cup championships in 2013, 2015, 2016, and 2019; and multiple second-place finishes; and appearances in the Barassi International Australian Football Youth Tournament.

In 2023, female youth sides were fielded for the first time, including the 2023 Oceania Cup and 2024 Pacific Cup.

=== Oceania Cup ===
Key

Champion Runners-up 3rd Place

Oceania Cup results
Year	Finish (male)
(Fiji) 2009	2nd
(Tonga) 2010	4th
(Fiji) 2011	2nd
(Fiji) 2012	2nd
(Fiji) 2013	1st
(Fiji) 2014	2nd
(Fiji) 2015	1st
(Fiji) 2016	1st
(Fiji) 2017	2nd
(Fiji) 2018	2nd
(Fiji) 2019	1st
(Fiji) 2023	2nd

== See also ==
- New Nauru Stadium
