= Oceania Cup (Australian rules football) =

Australian rules football competition

- Sport: Australian rules football
- First season: 2009
- Most recent champion: Nauru (2019)
- Most titles: Fiji; Nauru (4 titles)

The Oceania Cup is an annual under-16 Australian rules football competition contested by the national teams of the Oceania region of the Pacific. The tournament is held in December each year. The event was first held in 2009. Following the COVID-19 pandemic, the 2023 edition of the tournament was announced as the first to be held since 2019 and the first to feature a women's division.

== Nations ==
The following nations have taken part in at least one edition of the competition.

- Fiji
- Nauru
- New Zealand
- Papua New Guinea
- Samoa
- Solomon Islands
- Tonga
- Vanuatu

== Results ==
Year	Host	Participants	Venue	Winner	Runner-up	Ref.
2009	Fiji	Fiji; Nauru; New Zealand; Samoa; Tonga	Cathedral Secondary School Grounds, Suva	Tonga	Nauru	
2010	Tonga	Fiji; Nauru; New Zealand; Papua New Guinea; Samoa; South Pacific All-Stars; Solomon Islands; Tonga; Vanuatu	Nukuʻalofa	Papua New Guinea	Tonga	
2011	Fiji	Fiji; Nauru; New Zealand; Papua New Guinea; Samoa; Solomon Islands; Tonga; Vanuatu	Albert Park, Suva	New Zealand	Nauru	
2012	Fiji	Fiji; Nauru; Solomon Islands; Tonga; Vanuatu	Albert Park, Suva	Fiji	Nauru	
2013	Fiji	Fiji; Nauru; Tonga; / Vanuatu/Fiji	Albert Park, Suva	Nauru	Fiji	
2014	Fiji	Fiji; Nauru; Tonga; Vanuatu	Albert Park, Suva	Fiji	Nauru	
2015	Fiji	Fiji; Nauru; Tonga	Furnival Park, Suva	Nauru	Fiji	
2016	Fiji	Fiji; Nauru; Solomon Islands; Tonga; Vanuatu	Albert Park, Suva	Nauru	Fiji	
2017	Fiji	Fiji; Nauru; Tonga; Vanuatu	Albert Park, Suva	Fiji	Nauru	
2018	Fiji	Fiji; Nauru; South Pacific All-Stars; Vanuatu	Albert Park, Suva	Fiji	Nauru	
2019	Fiji	Fiji; Nauru; South Pacific All-Stars; Tonga	Albert Park, Suva	Nauru	Fiji	
2023	Fiji	Fiji; Nauru; Papua New Guinea; Tonga	Albert Park, Suva	Papua New Guinea	Nauru	
