= AFL Pacific Cup =

Australian rules football competition

- Sport: Australian rules football
- First season: 2024
- No. of teams: 2024: 4 men's & 6 women's
- Country: Host: Queensland
- Most recent champions: Papua New Guinea (Open Men); Nauru (Open Women); Nauru (Under 17 Boys); Papua New Guinea (Under 17 Girls)
- Most titles: Papua New Guinea (Open Men; 1 title); Nauru (Open Women; 1 title); Nauru (Under 17 Boys; 1 title); Papua New Guinea (Under 17 Girls; 1 title)
- Broadcaster: YouTube

The AFL Pacific Cup is a triennial international tournament in Australian rules football open to all nations in Oceania and Southern Africa. It was created as a replacement of the AFL International Cup alongside the AFL Asia Cup and the AFL Transatlantic Cup after the competition was affected by the COVID-19 pandemic.

In August 2021, the AFL announced that the IC would return in 2023 to align with its original three-year schedule but did not announce the host. On 22 April 2022, the AFL announced it was postponing the International Cup until 2024 citing "significant investment required from the AFL to host the event". However, on 24 July 2023, the AFL announced that, in lieu of the International Cup, that it would be sponsoring three regional events in 2024: the Trans-Atlantic Cup, the Asia Cup, and the Pacific Cup to be hosted by an international affiliate. The AFL gave no indication as to when the International Cup would be resumed, however indicated that these are the only AFL sanctioned international tournaments since 2017 (effectively nullifying the 2019 and 2022 AFL Europe Championship). AFL Canada was announced as host of the Transatlantic Cup to be held at the Humber College Oval at Colonel Samuel Smith Park in Toronto on August 2–11, The Maroochydore Multi Sports Complex on the Sunshine Coast, Queensland was announced as the host of the Pacific Cup on 14–24 November. Thanh Long Sports Center in Vietnam would host the Asia Cup at in Ho Chi Minh City from December 6–8 in 2024. The AFL announced strict selection criteria, that each player must hold citizenship for the country that they are representing and must have played in from a local competition in that country.

The 2024 AFL Pacific Cup was played at the Maroochydore Multisports Complex from November 14 to November 24, 2024 and contested in four divisions: Open Men, Open Women, Under 17 Boys & Under 17 Girls. It resulted in Papua New Guinea winning both the Open Men & Under 17 Girls championships and Nauru winning both the Open Women and Under 17 Boys championships.

== Open Men's Pacific Cup ==
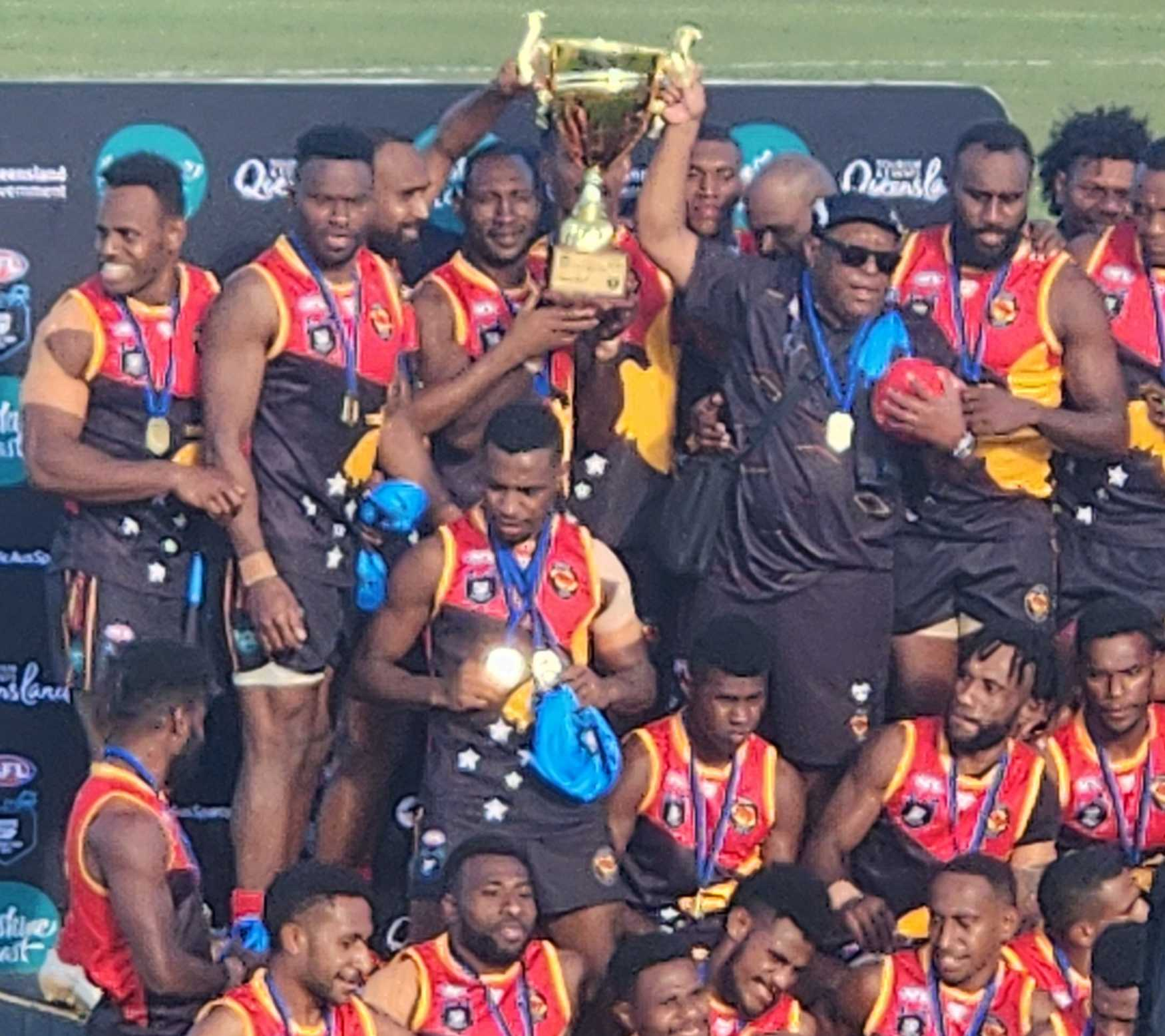
Papua New Guinea Mosquitos, open men's winners

| Flag(s) | Nation(s) | Moniker | 2024 (Queensland) (4) | 2027 |
|---|---|---|---|---|
| (Fiji) | Fiji | Tribe | 4th | |
| (Nauru) | Nauru | Chiefs | 2nd | |
| (New Zealand) | New Zealand | Falcons | 3rd | |
| (Papua New Guinea) | Papua New Guinea | Mosquitoes | 1st | |

== Open Women's Pacific Cup ==
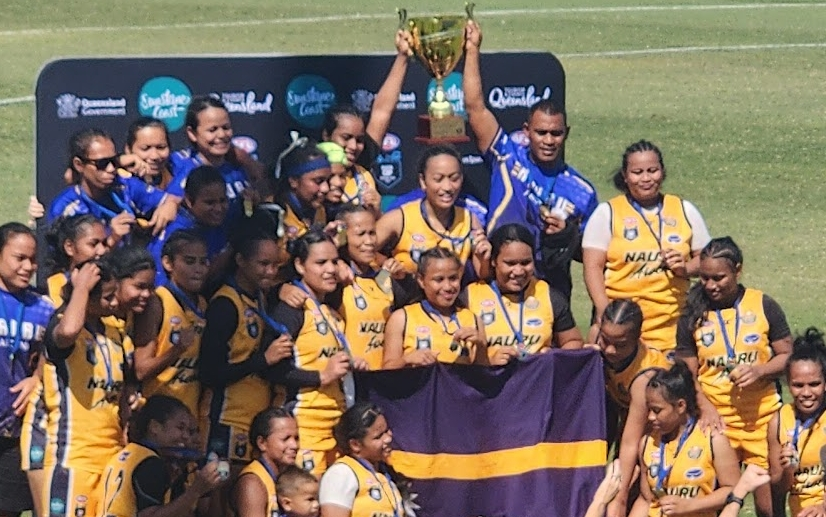
Nauru Aoreni open women's winners

| Flag(s) | Nation(s) | Moniker | 2024 (Queensland) (4) | 2027 |
|---|---|---|---|---|
| (Nauru) | Nauru | Aroeni | 1st | |
| (New Zealand) | New Zealand | Kahu | 2nd | |
| (Papua New Guinea) | Papua New Guinea | Flames | 3rd | |
| (Tonga) | Tonga | Storm | 4th | |

== Under 17 Boy's Pacific Cup ==
| Flag(s) | Nation(s) | Moniker | 2024 (Queensland) (5) | 2027 |
|---|---|---|---|---|
| (Fiji) | Fiji | Junior Tribe | 5th | |
| (Nauru) | Nauru | Stars | 1st | |
| (Papua New Guinea) | Papua New Guinea | Binatangs | 2nd | |
| (South Africa) | South Africa | Junior Lions | 3rd | |
| (Tonga) | Tonga | Thunder | 4th | |

== Under 17 Girl's Pacific Cup ==
| Flag(s) | Nation(s) | Moniker | 2024 (Queensland) (4) | 2027 |
|---|---|---|---|---|
| (Fiji) | Fiji | Junior Vonu | 4th | |
| (Nauru) | Nauru | Angels | 3rd | |
| (Papua New Guinea) | Papua New Guinea | Kurakums | 1st | |
| (Tonga) | Tonga | Storm | 2nd | |
