= 2011 Australian Football International Cup =

- League: Australian Football International Cup
- Sport: Australian rules football
- Men's Division 1 champions: (Republic of Ireland) Ireland
- Men's Division 1 runners-up: Papua New Guinea
- Men's Division 2 champions: Fiji
- Men's Division 2 runners-up: France
- Women's Division champions: (Republic of Ireland) Ireland
- Women's Division runners-up: Canada

Australian Football International Cup seasons
- ← 2008 2014 →

The 2011 Australian Football International Cup (also known as the AFL International Cup 2011 or IC11) was the fourth edition of the Australian Football International Cup, an international Australian rules football competition run by the Australian Football League (AFL).

It was contested between 12 and 27 August 2011 by 18 nations, with games played in both Melbourne and Sydney. Two matches were played as curtain raisers to AFL premiership matches, USA vs South Africa at Stadium Australia and the IC Grand Final at the Melbourne Cricket Ground.

Ireland won its second men's championship, and the inaugural women's championship (Ryan Aslett Cup).

== Competing Teams ==
On 1 July 2011, the AFL confirmed the 18 men's teams that would participate in the 2011 International Cup:

Guernsey	Country	Nickname	Final Rank	World Team Rep's
	(Republic of Ireland) Ireland	Warriors	1	3 + Coach
	Papua New Guinea	Mosquitos	2	4
	New Zealand	Falcons	3	3
	(United States) USA	Revolution	4	3
	South Africa	Lions	5	3
	Nauru	Chiefs	6	1
	(United Kingdom) Great Britain	Bulldogs	7	0
	Denmark	Vikings	8	1
	Tonga	Tigers	9	1
	Canada	Northwind	10	1
	Sweden	Elks	11	1
	Japan	Samurais	12	1
	Fiji	Tribe	13 (1st Div 2)	1
	France	Les Coqs	14 (2nd Div 2)	0
	(Palestinian Authority) Israel & Palestine	Peres Team for Peace	15	0
	India	Tigers	16	0
	China	Red Demons	17	0
	Timor-Leste	Crocodiles	18	0

17 of these clubs represented single nations, and one (the Peres Team for Peace) represented both Israel and the Palestinian Territories.

As well as the above Men's teams, for the first time in the history of the tournament, there was also a Women's competition, with five teams participating:

Guernsey	Country	Nickname	Final Rank	World Team Rep's
	(Republic of Ireland) Ireland	Banshees	1	8 + Coach
	Canada	Canada Northern Lights	2	5
	(United States) USA	Freedom	3	6
	Papua New Guinea	Flame	4	3
	Indigenous/Multicultural Australia	Indigenous/Multicultural	5	2

== Men's Fixtures ==
=== Round 1 ===
Before the tournament, the 18 clubs were seeded into six groups of three, ranked based on previous performance in International Cups, or in the case of the newer teams, at the discretion of the AFL:

Group 1	Group 2	Group 3	Group 4	Group 5	Group 6
Papua New Guinea (1); Tonga (12); France (18)	New Zealand (2); Sweden (11); India (17)	South Africa (3); Denmark (10); China (16)	(Republic of Ireland) Ireland (4); (United Kingdom) Great Britain (9); (Timor-Leste) East Timor (15)	Nauru (5); Japan (8); Fiji (14)	Canada (6); United States (7); (Israel) (Palestine) Peres Team for Peace (13)

==== Matches ====
The first round of matches was played with modified rules, most significantly the reduction of game length to two-quarters, in the same manner as the 2011 NAB Cup.

	Group 1
Saturday, 13 August 11:00 am	Papua New Guinea 6.8 (44)	def.	Tonga 1.1 (7)	Blacktown International Sportspark 1	Report
Saturday, 13 August 12:00 pm	Papua New Guinea 10.10 (70)	def.	France 0.0 (0)	Blacktown International Sportspark 1	Report
Saturday, 13 August 1:00 pm	Tonga 7.6 (48)	def.	France 1.1 (7)	Blacktown International Sportspark 1	Report
Papua New Guinea and Tonga advance to Division 1.; France advances to Division 2.

	Group 2
Saturday, 13 August 2:00 pm	New Zealand 6.5 (41)	def.	Sweden 0.0 (0)	Blacktown International Sportspark 1	Report
Saturday, 13 August 3:00 pm	New Zealand 15.4 (94)	def.	India 0.0 (0)	Blacktown International Sportspark 1	Report
Saturday, 13 August 4:00 pm	Sweden 7.7 (49)	def.	India 0.1 (1)	Blacktown International Sportspark 1	Report
New Zealand and Sweden advance to Division 1.; India advances to Division 2.

	Group 3
Saturday, 13 August 5:00 pm	South Africa 4.2 (26)	def.	Denmark 1.3 (9)	Blacktown International Sportspark 1	Report
Saturday, 13 August 6:00 pm	South Africa 18.6 (114)	def.	China 0.0 (0)	Blacktown International Sportspark 1	Report
Saturday, 13 August 7:00 pm	Denmark 10.8 (68)	def.	China 1.0 (6)	Blacktown International Sportspark 1	Report
South Africa and Denmark advance to Division 1.; China advances to Division 2.

	Group 4
Saturday, 13 August 11:00 am	(United Kingdom) Great Britain 10.10 (70)	def.	(Timor-Leste) East Timor 0.0 (0)	Blacktown International Sportspark 2	Report
Saturday, 13 August 12:00 pm	(Republic of Ireland) Ireland 14.9 (93)	def.	(Timor-Leste) East Timor 0.0 (0)	Blacktown International Sportspark 2	Report
Saturday, 13 August 1:00 pm	(Republic of Ireland) Ireland 8.6 (54)	def.	(United Kingdom) Great Britain 1.0 (6)	Blacktown International Sportspark 2	Report
Ireland and Great Britain advance to Division 1.; East Timor advances to Division 2.

	Group 5
Saturday, 13 August 2:00 pm	Nauru 6.6 (42)	def.	Japan 3.1 (19)	Blacktown International Sportspark 2	Report
Saturday, 13 August 3:00 pm	Nauru 6.6 (42)	def.	Fiji 2.3 (15)	Blacktown International Sportspark 2	Report
Saturday, 13 August 4:00 pm	Japan 4.6 (30)	def.	Fiji 4.4 (28)	Blacktown International Sportspark 2	Report
Nauru and Japan advance to Division 1.; Fiji advances to Division 2.

	Group 6
Saturday, 13 August 5:00 pm	Canada 2.0 (12)	def. by	United States 2.3 (15)	Blacktown International Sportspark 2	Report
Saturday, 13 August 6:00 pm	Canada 3.6 (24)	def.	(Israel) (Palestine) Peres Team for Peace 0.0 (0)	Blacktown International Sportspark 2	Report
Saturday, 13 August 7:00 pm	United States 12.7 (79)	def.	(Israel) (Palestine) Peres Team for Peace 0.0 (0)	Blacktown International Sportspark 2	Report
United States and Canada advance to Division 1.; Peres Team for Peace advances to Division 2.

=== Round 2 ===
At the conclusion of Round 1, the best two teams from each Group were regrouped into four groups of three teams, based on Win-Draw-Loss performance and Percentage in Round 1, all within a larger group known as Division 1. These teams would remain in contention for the International Cup title. The remaining six were regrouped in the same way, into two subgroups of Division 2. These teams would compete for a secondary prize.

The structure of the groups was as follows:

Division 1				Division 2	
Group 1	Group 2	Group 3	Group 4	Group 1	Group 2
New Zealand (1); Canada (8); (United Kingdom) Great Britain (9)	(Republic of Ireland) Ireland (2); Denmark (7); Sweden (10)	Papua New Guinea (3); Nauru (6); Tonga (11)	South Africa (4); United States (5); Japan (12)	Fiji (13); China (15); (Israel) (Palestine) Peres Team for Peace (17)	France (14); India (16); (Timor-Leste) East Timor (18)

==== Division 1 ====
Division 1 teams played one match against each team in their respective groups.

	Division 1 Group 1
Monday, 15 August 4:00 pm	Canada 2.3 (15)	def. by	(United Kingdom) Great Britain 6.8 (44)	Blacktown International Sportspark 2	Report
Wednesday, 17 August 2:00 pm	New Zealand 15.10 (100)	def.	(United Kingdom) Great Britain 0.2 (2)	Bruce Purser Reserve	Report
Saturday, 20 August 10:00 am	New Zealand 5.9 (39)	def.	Canada 3.2 (20)	Blacktown International Sportspark 1	Report

	Division 1 Group 2
Monday, 15 August 12:00 pm	Denmark 12.5 (77)	def.	Sweden 6.2 (38)	Blacktown International Sportspark 2	Report
Wednesday, 17 August 2:00 pm	(Republic of Ireland) Ireland 15.14 (104)	def.	Sweden 1.0 (6)	Bus Loop Oval	Report
Saturday, 20 August 4:00 pm	(Republic of Ireland) Ireland 11.6 (72)	def.	Denmark 1.3 (9)	Blacktown International Sportspark 2	Report

	Division 1 Group 3
Monday, 15 August 2:00 pm	Nauru 9.7 (61)	def.	Tonga 5.5 (35)	Blacktown International Sportspark 2	Report
Wednesday, 17 August 2:00 pm	Papua New Guinea 17.17 (119)	def.	Tonga 0.2 (2)	Gipps Road Sporting Complex, Holroyd	Report
Saturday, 20 August 2:00 pm	Papua New Guinea 16.14 (110)	def.	Nauru 4.3 (27)	Blacktown International Sportspark 2	Report

	Division 1 Group 4
Monday, 15 August 5:00 pm	United States 17.12 (114)	def.	Japan 0.1 (1)	Blacktown International Sportspark 1	Report
Wednesday, 17 August 2:00 pm	South Africa 14.9 (93)	def.	Japan 1.3 (9)	Mona Park, Auburn	Report
Sunday, 21 August 10:40 am	South Africa 2.6 (18)	def. by	United States 7.14 (56)	ANZ Stadium (C-R to AFL Round 22 match Sydney vs St Kilda)	Report

TEAM	P	W	L	D	PF	PA	%	PTS
(Republic of Ireland) Ireland	2	2	0	0	176	15	1173.33	8
United States	2	2	0	0	170	19	894.74	8
Papua New Guinea	2	2	0	0	229	29	789.66	8
New Zealand	2	2	0	0	139	22	631.82	8
South Africa	2	1	1	0	65	46	170.77	4
Denmark	2	1	1	0	86	110	78.18	4
Nauru	2	1	1	0	88	145	60.69	4
(United Kingdom) Great Britain	2	1	1	0	46	115	40.00	4
Canada	2	0	2	0	35	83	42.17	0
Sweden	2	0	2	0	44	181	24.31	0
Tonga	2	0	2	0	37	180	20.56	0
Japan	2	0	2	0	10	207	4.83	0

==== Division 2 ====
Division 2 teams played one match against each team in their respective groups, as well as a single "cross-over" match against a team in the opposite group.

	Division 2 Group 1
Wednesday, 17 August 12:00 pm	Fiji 11.19 (85)	def.	(Israel) (Palestine) Peres Team for Peace 4.2 (26)	Mona Park, Auburn	Report
Saturday, 20 August 6:00 pm	China 1.1 (7)	def. by	(Israel) (Palestine) Peres Team for Peace 12.18 (90)	Blacktown International Sportspark 1	Report
Wednesday, 24 August 1:00 pm	Fiji 14.17 (101)	def.	China 2.3 (15)	Western Oval	Report

	Division 2 Group 2
Wednesday, 17 August 2:00 pm	France 17.20 (122)	def.	(Timor-Leste) East Timor 2.1 (13)	Blacktown International Sportspark 2	Report
Saturday, 20 August 12:00 pm	France 14.15 (99)	def.	India 1.2 (8)	Blacktown International Sportspark 2	Report
Wednesday, 24 August 9:00 am	India 9.6 (60)	def.	(Timor-Leste) East Timor 8.4 (52)	Western Oval	Report

	Division 2 Cross-Over Matches
Wednesday, 17 August 12:00 pm	China 5.12 (42)	def.	India 2.2 (14)	Blacktown International Sportspark 2	Report
Saturday, 20 August 6:00 pm	Fiji 21.16 (142)	def.	(Timor-Leste) East Timor 1.1 (7)	Blacktown International Sportspark 2	Report
Wednesday, 24 August 11:00 am	France 5.5 (35)	def.	(Israel) (Palestine) Peres Team for Peace 4.5 (29)	Western Oval	Report

TEAM	P	W	L	D	PF	PA	%	PTS
Fiji	3	3	0	0	328	42	780.95	12
France	3	3	0	0	256	50	512.00	12
(Israel) (Palestine) Peres Team for Peace	3	1	2	0	139	127	109.45	4
India	3	1	2	0	82	194	42.27	4
China	3	1	2	0	64	205	31.22	4
(Timor-Leste) East Timor	3	0	3	0	72	324	22.22	0

=== Division 1 Semi-Finals ===
At the conclusion of Round 2, the teams were once again re-seeded based on their performance in the previous round; the teams in Division 1 were seeded in positions 1-12, and the teams in Division 2 in positions 13–18.

	Division 1 Semi-Finals
Wednesday, 24 August 9:00 am	Denmark 1.1 (7)	def. by	Nauru 15.4 (94)	Ransford Oval	Report
Wednesday, 24 August 11:00 am	South Africa 7.9 (51)	def.	(United Kingdom) Great Britain 2.3 (15)	Ransford Oval	Report
Wednesday, 24 August 1:00 pm	United States 3.3 (21)	def. by	Papua New Guinea 9.14 (63)	Ransford Oval	Report
Wednesday, 24 August 3:00 pm	(Republic of Ireland) Ireland 5.16 (46)	def.	New Zealand 2.1 (13)	Ransford Oval	Report
Wednesday, 24 August 3:00 pm	Canada 13.8 (86)	def.	Japan 2.1 (13)	McAllister Oval	Report
Wednesday, 24 August 3:00 pm	Sweden 1.3 (9)	def. by	Tonga 5.9 (39)	Western Oval	Report

These matches were played at the same time as the final round 2 Division 2 matches; the Division 2 teams did not participate in this round.

=== Finals ===
	Division 1 11th/12th-place Playoff
Friday, 26 August 12:30 pm	Sweden 5.7 (37)	def.	Japan 4.9 (33)	Western Oval	Report

	Division 1 9th/10th-place Playoff
Friday, 26 August 10:30 am	Canada 6.4 (40)	def. by	Tonga 6.10 (46)	Ransford Oval	Report

	Division 1 7th/8th-place Playoff
Friday, 26 August 10:30 am	Denmark 3.3 (21)	def. by	(United Kingdom) Great Britain 8.12 (60)	McAllister Oval	Report

	Division 1 5th/6th-place Playoff
Friday, 26 August 12:30 pm	South Africa 7.10 (52)	def.	Nauru 7.4 (46)	McAllister Oval	Report

	Division 1 3rd/4th-place Playoff
Friday, 26 August 12:30 pm	United States 6.5 (41)	def. by	New Zealand 12.4 (76)	Ransford Oval	Report

Division 1 Grand Final
Saturday, 27 August 11:40 am	(Republic of Ireland) Ireland	def.	Papua New Guinea	Melbourne Cricket Ground (C-R to AFL Round 23 match Hawthorn vs Western Bulldogs)	Report
1.0 (6); 3.0 (18); 5.4 (34); 8.5 (53)	Q1; Q2; Q3; Final	3.2 (20); 5.4 (34); 5.5 (35); 5.5 (35)
Mike Finn 4 Fergal McManus 3 Fearghal Purcell 1	Goals	S. Susuve 3 B. Beno, A. Pinda 1
Mike Finn, Seán McGuinness, Cian Quigley, Roch Hanmore, Fearghal Purcell, Gerard Walls	Best	P. Philip, J. Ikupu, S. Susuve, G. Simon, B. Beno, J. James
Ireland scored the last seven goals of the match to complete a big comeback.

	Division 2 5th/6th-place Playoff
Friday, 26 August 8:30 am	China 6.6 (42)	def.	(Timor-Leste) East Timor 5.5 (35)	Ransford Oval	Report

	Division 2 3rd/4th-place Playoff
Friday, 26 August 8:30 am	(Israel) (Palestine) Peres Team for Peace 7.15 (57)	def.	India 2.8 (20)	McAllister Oval	Report

	Division 2 Grand Final
Friday, 26 August 2:30 pm	Fiji 9.8 (62)	def.	France 3.3 (21)	McAllister Oval	Report

== Women's Fixtures ==
=== Round 1 ===
In the opening round of the Women's International Cup, the five teams played each other once, over the course of 10 days.

	Round 1
Monday, 15 August 1:00 pm	Australia 1.1 (7)	def. by	Papua New Guinea 9.3 (57)	Blacktown International Sportspark 1	Report
Monday, 15 August 3:00 pm	Canada 1.2 (8)	def. by	(Republic of Ireland) Ireland 4.7 (31)	Blacktown International Sportspark 1	Report
Wednesday, 17 August 12:00 pm	Australia 0.0 (0)	def. by	United States 10.12 (72)	Bruce Purser Reserve	Report
Wednesday, 17 August 12:00 pm	Papua New Guinea 0.0 (0)	def. by	Canada 3.7 (25)	Bus Loop Oval	Report
Thursday, 18 August 5:00 pm	Australia 0.1 (1)	def. by	(Republic of Ireland) Ireland 19.13 (127)	Blacktown International Sportspark 1	Report
Thursday, 18 August 7:00 pm	Papua New Guinea 1.0 (6)	def. by	United States 6.5 (41)	Blacktown International Sportspark 1	Report
Saturday, 20 August 1:00 pm	Papua New Guinea 2.0 (12)	def. by	(Republic of Ireland) Ireland 12.8 (80)	Mona Park, Auburn	Report
Saturday, 20 August 3:00 pm	Canada 4.5 (29)	def.	United States 1.5 (11)	Mona Park, Auburn	Report
Wednesday, 24 August 11:00 am	Australia 2.0 (12)	def. by	Canada 4.8 (32)	McAllister Oval	Report
Wednesday, 24 August 1:00 pm	(Republic of Ireland) Ireland 5.5 (35)	def.	United States 2.4 (16)	McAllister Oval	Report

TEAM	P	W	L	D	PF	PA	%	PTS
(Republic of Ireland) Ireland	4	4	0	0	263	37	737.84	16
Canada	4	3	1	0	94	54	174.07	12
United States	4	2	2	0	140	70	200.00	8
Papua New Guinea	4	1	3	0	75	153	49.02	4
Australia	4	0	4	0	20	288	6.94	0

=== Finals ===
At the conclusion of Round 1, Australia, the lowest ranked team in the competition based on points and percentage, was eliminated and finished in 5th place. The remaining four clubs will compete in the finals.

	3rd/4th-place Playoff
Friday, 26 August 12:30 pm	United States 4.3 (27)	def.	Papua New Guinea 1.2 (8)	Western Oval	Report

	Grand Final
Friday, 26 August 2:30 pm	(Republic of Ireland) Ireland 5.9 (39)	def.	Canada 1.2 (8)	Ransford Oval	Report

== World Teams ==
=== Men's World Team ===
AFL International Cup 2011 Men's World Team
B:	(Canada) Steve Rutledge	(New Zealand) Steven Howard	(Fiji) Laijiasa Bolenaivalu
HB:	(Tonga) Penisimani Mahina	(Republic of Ireland) Mike Finn (C)	(South Africa) Tshoboko Moagi
C:	(Republic of Ireland) Paul Sharry	(Papua New Guinea) John James	(New Zealand) Andrew Marsden
HF:	(South Africa) Bayanda Sobetwa	(United States) Bryan Dragus	(Papua New Guinea) Emmaus Wartovo
F:	(Japan) Ken Sato	(Papua New Guinea) Stanis Susuve	(Nauru) Johnny Dagiaro
Foll:	(United Kingdom) Anthony Trigg	(Republic of Ireland) Kevin O’Brien	(United States) Steve Fashant
Int:	(New Zealand) Aaron Harris	(Papua New Guinea) John Ikupu	(Denmark) Mathias Biron
Int:	(South Africa) Steven Matshane	(Sweden) Johan Lantz	(United States) Andrew Werner
Coach:	(Republic of Ireland) Tom Madigan & PNG Coach (not found)		

=== Women's World Team ===
AFL International Cup 2011 Women's World Team
B:	(Canada) Caitlin Kidd	(Republic of Ireland) Laura Corrigan	(Australia) Emma MacNeill
HB:	(Republic of Ireland) Natlie Behan	(United States) Becky Kraft	(Canada) Erin Le Blanc
C:	(Papua New Guinea) Taiva Lavai	(Republic of Ireland) Marie Keating	(United States) Judith Stein (C)
HF:	(Australia) Natalie Daylight	(Papua New Guinea) Alang Vinnie Isaac	(United States) Courtney Church
F:	(Republic of Ireland) Gillian Behan	(Republic of Ireland) Nuala O’Hagan	(United States) Lindsay Kastanek
Foll:	(Canada) Erin Loughnane	(Canada) Aimee Legault	(Republic of Ireland) Emma Kelly
Int:	(Republic of Ireland) Louise Loughlin	(Canada) Sarah Ennor	(Republic of Ireland) Ashlene Groogan
Int:	(Papua New Guinea) Jocelyn Tatsie	(United States) Jessie Hazen	(United States) Monica Rasocha
Coach:	(Republic of Ireland) Andrew Hickey		
