= Maroochydore Multi Sports Complex =

Sports facility in Maroochydore, Queensland

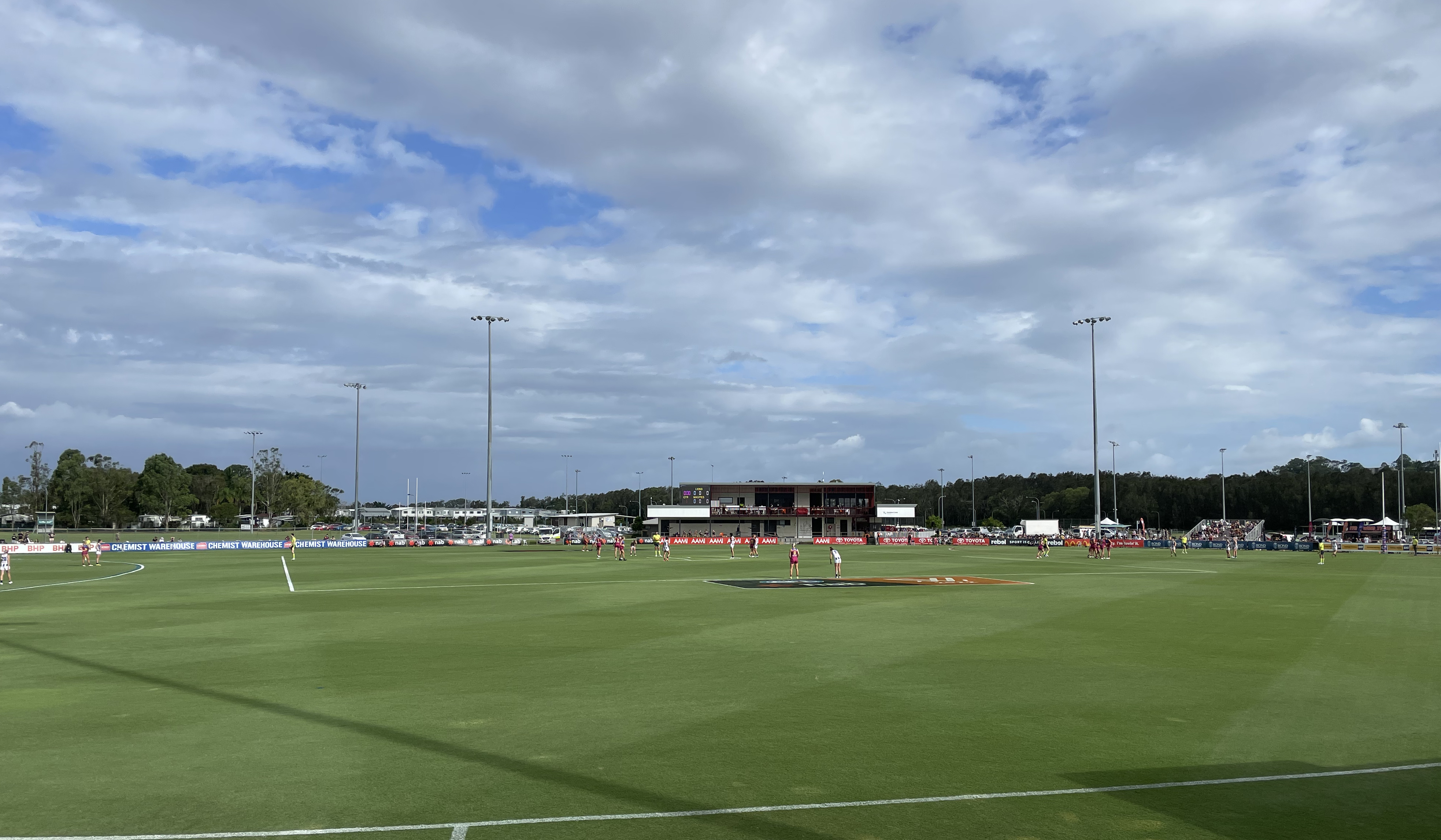
- The main playing field, in use for an AFL Women's game between Brisbane and Collingwood.
- Interactive map of Maroochydore Multi Sports Complex
- Location: Maroochydore, Queensland
- Coordinates: 26.644553°S 153.058249°E
- Capacity: 5,000
- Surface: Grass

Tenants
- Brisbane Lions (AFLW) (2022 (S6)); AFL Queensland; Maroochydore Football Club; Sunshine Coast Masters Australian Football Queensland; Sunshine Coast AFL Umpires; Buderim United Churches Soccer; Sunshine Coast Netball Association

Maroochydore Multi Sports Complex is a multi-purpose community sports facility located in Maroochydore, Sunshine Coast, Queensland.

== Overview ==
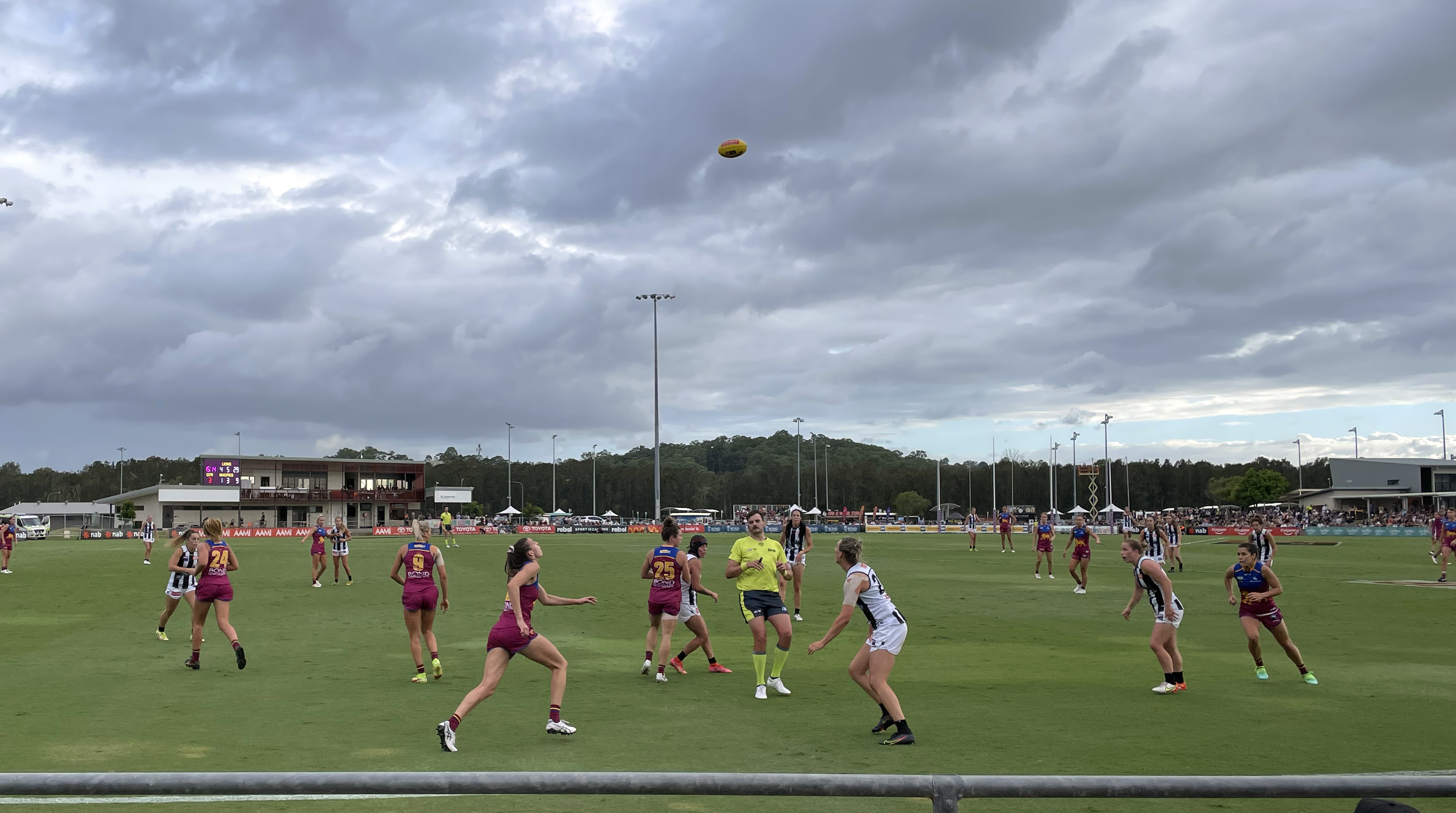
Tahlia Hickie (Brisbane) competes in a ruck contest against Sophie Alexander (Collingwood) during the Lions' Round 5, 2022 (S6) victory over the Magpies.

Maroochydore Multi Sports Complex has three floodlit ovals for Australian rules football, three soccer pitches and more than 20 floodlit outdoor netball courts. The complex regularly hosts community events for these sports, and has also hosted a pre-season Australian Football League (AFL) match in 2012. The Brisbane Lions women's team played several of their home matches throughout 2022 season 6 at the complex, prior to moving to their permanent ground in Springfield in 2023. Maroochydore Football Club plays home matches in various AFL Queensland sanctioned leagues at the facility.

In 2016, the venue has been selected to host the Preliminary and Grand Finals for the AFL Queensland Schools Cup, the premier inter-school competition for Australian football in Queensland. Since, then, the venue has been hosting this competition annually.

In 2020 the venue underwent a $2.7 million upgrade that included construction of a new multi-sport field with hybrid turf, as well as improved lighting, interchange boxes for players, coaches boxes and additional earth mounds for spectators. Consequently the complex was a training hub for at least five AFL clubs in the COVID-19–affected 2020 and 2021 seasons.

The venue was selected to host the 2020 Australian Football International Cup event prior to its cancellation due to the COVID-19 pandemic. Instead it hosted the 2024 AFL Pacific Cup.
