= Miss Grand Laos =

National beauty contest in Laos

- Formation: July 15, 2017; 9 years ago
- Founder: Thepmahavixay Saythilath
- Headquarters: Vientiane Prefecture
- Location: Laos
- Official language: Lao
- National Director: Souriyom Chandalasane
- Key people: Thepmahavixay Saythilath, Souriyom Chandalasane
- Parent organization: 78 Creation Sole Co., Ltd & SV Trading Sole Co., Ltd. (2024)
- Affiliations: Miss Grand International

Miss Grand Laos
licensees timeline

Stand-alone pageant
Under another pageant
Appointed titleholder
No licensee/titleholder

Miss Grand Laos (Lao: ມີສແກຣນລາວ) is an annual female national beauty pageant of Laos, founded by the Miss Laos Company Limited in 2017 to 2018. The winner represents Laos at Miss Grand International. from 2019 to 2023, the franchise holder of the contest was the Prime Modeling Agency, which is managed by Saikeo Sidavong. From 2024 to the present, the franchise holder is 78 Creation Sole Co., Ltd and SV Trading Sole Co., Ltd, and is managed by Thepmahavixay Saythilath and Souriyom Chandalasane.

Since its first Miss Grand International, Laos has reached the top 20 three times represented by Chinnaly Nolasing of Vientiane, Phetmany Philakhong of Vientiane Prefecture, and Sirisopha Phimmakaisone of Champasak. The 2026 winner is Louise Chanthalangsy, who will represent Laos at Miss Grand International 2026 in Thailand.

== Background ==
=== History ===
Before 2017, there was a single annual national beauty pageant, Miss Laos. Its winners were not sent to compete on the international stage. To promote Lao beauty pageants, the president of Miss Grand International, Nawat Itsaragrisil, together with Miss Laos chairman, Hongkham Souvannavong, cooperatively ran the first contes of Miss Grand Laos in 2017 at ITECC Shopping Mall in Vientiane, to select a country representative for Miss Grand International 2017. The winner was Chinnaly Nolasing. In addition to Miss Grand Laos, the Miss Laos Company also holds the license of Miss Universe Laos and Miss International Laos.

In 2019, Miss Laos company relinquished the Miss Grand franchise to Saikeo Sidavong, the organizer of Miss World Laos. Under Sidavong's management, his first affiliated contest was Miss World Laos 2019. However, the winner did not participate at Miss Grand International 2019 in Venezuela, due to visa issues. In 2020 and 2021 representatives were appointed to the position without a contest as a result of the COVID-19 pandemic.

Since its inception, the contest has been organised under the control of the Lao People's Revolutionary Party's established governor, the Lao People's Revolutionary Youth Union (Lao:ສູນກາງຊາວໜຸ່ມປະຊາຊົນປະຕິວັດລາວ), which is dedicated to focusing on the fields of information, media, entertainment, art, and music as well as the domestic pageant industry.

=== Selection of contestants ===
At the first two contests, the contestants were selected by the central organizer through an online application. In 2023, Miss Grand Laos began franchising the provincial competitions to individual organizers, who would name eighteen provincial titleholders to compete in the national pageant.

== Contests ==
Edition	Date	Venue	Entrants	Ref.
1st	15 July 2017	ITECC Shopping Mall, Xaysetha, Vientiane	17	
2nd	24 March 2018	ITECC Shopping Mall, Xaysetha, Vientiane	12	
— (Note: Miss Grand title was the supplemental award in the Miss World Laos 2019 pageant.)	20 August 2019	Landmark Hotel, Sisattanak, Vientiane	20	
3rd	27 September 2022	Crowne Plaza Vientiane, Vientiane	20	
4th	29 July 2023	National Convention Center (NCC), Vientiane	18	
5th	25 August 2024	ITECC Shopping Mall, Xaysetha, Vientiane	17	
6th	1 August 2025	Crowne Plaza Vientiane, Vientiane	17	

=== Previous contest results ===
Edition	Winner	Runners-up				Ref.
Edition	Winner	First	Second	Third	Fourth	Ref.
1st	Chinnaly Nolasing (Vientiane)	Phounsup Phonnyotha (Vientiane)	Kitsada Vongsaisawad (Vientiane)	Nidakone Chandalasane (Vientiane)	Sengsavanh Sihalath (Vientiane)	
2nd	Nobphalat Sykaiyphack (Vientiane)	Manika Soukvongsa (Sekong)	Siliyaphone Xaphilom (Vientiane)	—N/a	—N/a	
—	Malailak Phachan (Champasak)	Phatthana Khidaphone (Vientiane)	—N/a	—N/a	—N/a	
3rd	Phoutsavanh Vongkhamxao (Vientiane)	Soukanya Soulivong (Vientiane)	Chitta Thipphonephosy (Vientiane)	Kittima Khanthaphengxai (Vientiane)	Chindavan Saentavy (Vientiane)	
4th	Phetmany Philakong (Vientiane Prefecture)	Louise Chanthalangsy (Luang Namtha)	Palyna Khampasouk (Khammouane)	Arisa Khennavong (Savannakhet)	Saythong Thammavong (Xiangkhouang)	
5th	Souksavanh Vongsomphou (Champasak)	Lothjana Khounnavong (Vientiane Prefecture)	Latsamee Kinnavong (Attapeu)	Phavina Mounvongsa (Bolikhamsai)	Thipphavanh Inthavong (Xiangkhouang)	
6th	Sirisopha Phimmakaisone (Champasak)	Louise Chanthalangsy (Luang Prabang)	Bolanan Chanthavong (Savannakhet)	Phetphachan Phanthalangsy (Xiangkhouang)	Vanhnee Chaxouada (Attapeu)	
7th	Louise Chanthalangsy (Vientiane)					

== International competition ==
The following is a list of Lao representatives who competed at Miss Grand International.

Color keys

- : Declared the winner
- : Finished as a runner-up (Top 5)
- : Finished as a finalist (Top 10)
- : Finished as a semifinalist (Top 20/21)
- : Finished as special awards winner

Year	Miss Grand Laos	Title	Placement	Special Awards	National Director
2026	Louise Chanthalangsy	Miss Grand Laos 2026	Unplaced		Souriyom Chandalasane
2025	Sirisopha Phimmakaisone	Miss Grand Laos 2025	Top 22	1 Special Awards: Top 15 - Grand Talent	Souriyom Chandalasane
2024	Souksavanh Vongsomphou	Miss Grand Laos 2024	Unplaced		Souriyom Chandalasane
2023	Phetmany Philakong	Miss Grand Laos 2023	Top 20	1 Special Awards: Top 18 - Grand Voice Award	Saikeo Sidavong
2022	Phoutsavanh Vongkhamxao	Miss Grand Laos 2022	Unplaced		Saikeo Sidavong
2021	Daomixay Phachansitthy	Appointed	Unplaced		Saikeo Sidavong
2020	Phatthana Khidaphone	1st runner-up Miss Grand Laos 2019	Unplaced		Saikeo Sidavong
2019	Malailak Phachan	Miss Grand Laos 2019	Did not compete		Saikeo Sidavong
2018	Nobphalat Sykaiyphack	Miss Grand Laos 2018	Unplaced	1 Special Awards: Top 12 - Best in National Costume	Hongkham Souvannavong
2017	Chinnaly Nolasing	Miss Grand Laos 2017	Top 20	3 Special Awards: Top 3 - The Front Row of Opening Dance; Top 10 - Best in National Costume; Top 10 - Best in Swimsuit	Hongkham Souvannavong
2013	Christina Lasasimma	Miss Laos 2012	Did not compete		Hongkham Souvannavong

== Participating national finalists by province ==
The following list is the national finalists of Miss Grand Laos, as well as the competition results.

Province	1st	2nd	3rd	4th	5th	6th
Attapeu	No Province title (Contestants Finalists)			Y		
Bokeo	No Province title (Contestants Finalists)			Y	8	Y
Bolikhamsai	No Province title (Contestants Finalists)			Y		Y
Champasak	No Province title (Contestants Finalists)			11		
Houaphanh	No Province title (Contestants Finalists)			11	8	Y
Khammouane	No Province title (Contestants Finalists)				12	10
Luang Namtha	No Province title (Contestants Finalists)				12	Y
Luang Prabang	No Province title (Contestants Finalists)			11	Y	
Oudomxay	No Province title (Contestants Finalists)			Y	Y	Y
Phongsaly	No Province title (Contestants Finalists)			11	Y	Y
Sainyabuli	No Province title (Contestants Finalists)			11	12	10
Salavan	No Province title (Contestants Finalists)			11	Y	Y
Savannakhet	No Province title (Contestants Finalists)				12	
Sekong	No Province title (Contestants Finalists)			Y	Y	Y
Vientiane	No Province title (Contestants Finalists)			Y	Y	10
Vientiane Prefecture	No Province title (Contestants Finalists)					10
Xaisomboun	No Province title (Contestants Finalists)			Y	8	10
Xiangkhouang	No Province title (Contestants Finalists)					
Total	17	12	20	18	17	17
Color keys: : Declared the winner; : Finished as a 1st runner-up; : Finished as a 2nd runner-up; : Finished as a 3rd runner-up; : Finished as a 4th runner-up; : Finished as a 5th runner-up; A : Finished as a finalist, semifinalist or unplaced; × : Withdrew during the competition; × : No representative

== Winners gallery ==
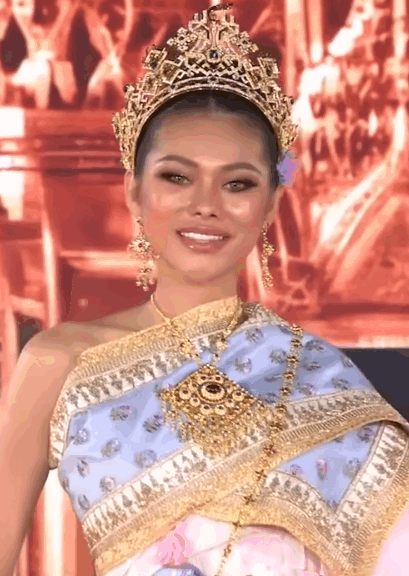
2025, Sirisopha Phimmakaisone

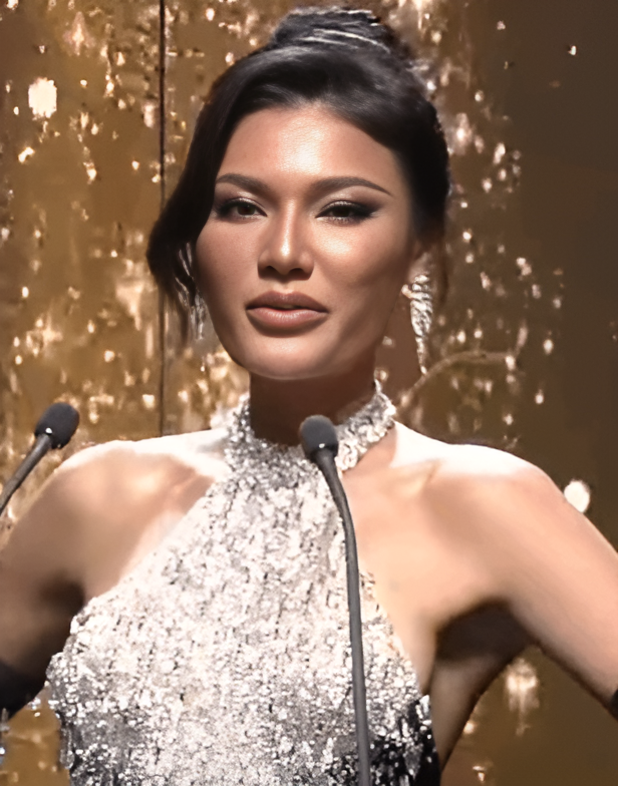
2024, Pimai Vongsomphou

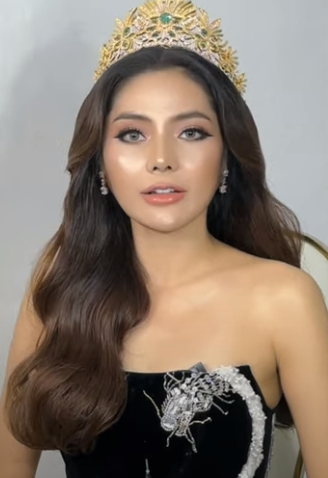
2023, Phetmany Philakhong

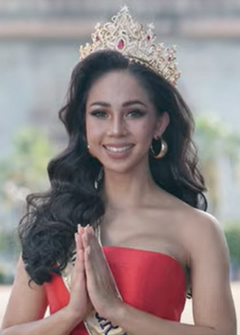
2022, Phoutsavanh Vongkhamxao

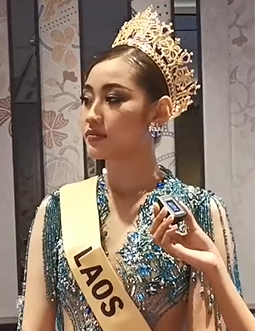
2021, Daomixay Phachansitthy

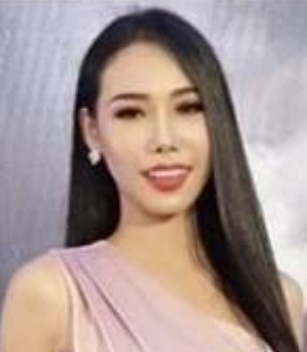
2018, Nobphalat Sykaiyphack
