= Miss Grand Laos 2025 =

6th Miss Grand Laos beauty pageant

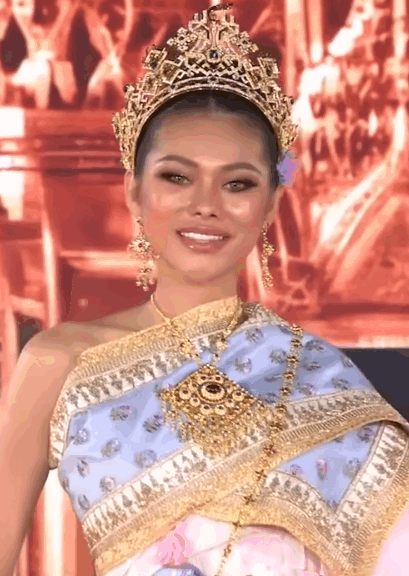
- Sirisopha Phimmakaisone, the winner of the contest
- Date: 1 August 2025
- Presenters: Viso Khamphichit, Phaimany Lathsabanthao
- Venue: Crowne Plaza Vientiane, Vientiane
- Broadcaster: Facebook; Youtube
- Entrants: 17
- Withdrawals: Oudomxay
- Returns: Vientiane
- Winner: Sirisopha Phimmakaisone (Champasak)

Miss Grand Laos 2025 (Lao: ມີສແກຣນລາວ 2025) was the 6th edition of the Miss Grand Laos pageant, held at the Crowne Plaza in Vientiane on 1 August 2025. Contestants from 17 provinces of Laos competed for the title.

The contest was won by Sirisopha Phimmakaisone of Champasak, who was crowned the preceding Miss Grand Laos 2024 Souksavanh Vongsomphou. Phimmakaisone then internationally represented Laos at Miss Grand International 2025 in Thailand on 18 October 2025, where she secured the placement of top 22.

The event was also attended by Miss Grand International 2024 CJ Opiaza of the Philippines and the vice president of Miss Grand International Teresa Chaivisut.

== Selection of contestants ==
Most of the contestants were appointed to the province titles by the local organizers. Out of 18 provinces, only 4 held their provincial pageants for this year's edition, as follows.

List of Miss Grand Laos 2025 preliminary pageants, by the coronation date
Pageant	Edition	Date & venue	Entrants	Number of qualifiers	Ref.
Miss Grand Xiangkhouang	1st	10 May 2025 at the COECCO Xiangkhouang Hotel, Phonsavan	10	1	
Miss Grand Oudomxay–Savannakhet	1st	20 May 2024 at the Le Thatluang D'oR Boutique Hotel, Vientiane	10	2 (Note: Oudomxay and Savannakhet)	
Miss Grand Vientiane (Note: Organized in parallel with the Miss Universe Oudomxay 2025 pageant.)	1st	31 May 2025 at the Empolma Cafe, Vientiane	6	1	

== Result ==
External videos
- Grand final competition

Miss Grand Laos 2025 competition result by province
Color key:
Winner	1st RU	2nd RU
3rd RU	4th RU	Top 10
Unplaced	Withdrew

Placement	Contestant
Miss Grand Laos 2025	Champasak – Sirisopha Phimmakaisone
1st Runner-Up	Luang Prabang – Louise Chanthalangsy
2nd Runner-Up	Savannakhet – Bolanan Chanthavong
3rd Runner-Up	Xiangkhouang – Phetphachan Phanthalangsy
4th Runner-Up	Attapeu – Vanhnee Chaxouada
Top 10	Khammouane – Malichai Singmavong; Sainyabuli – Soudalath Thamonty; Vientiane – Phaivun Chanthavong; Vientiane Prefecture – Latikone Souksomphan; Xaisomboun – Soutthida Chanthalangsy

== Contestants ==
Eighteen candidates were initially confirmed, but Oudomxay's representative withdrew, making the final of seventeen contestants.

Province	Contestant	Age (Note: Ages at the time of the pageant)
Attapeu	Vanhnee Chaxouada	18
Bokeo	Vanida Kaiyalath	19
Bolikhamxai	Fon Xaypanya	23
Champasak	Sirisopha Phimmakaisone	25
Houaphanh	Phim Phetsavanh	19
Khammouane	Malichai Singmavong	34
Luang Namtha	Chanthala Thiengmany	21
Luang Prabang	Louise Chanthalangsy	22
Phongsaly	Phamina Sichampa	25
Sainyabuli	Soudalath Thamonty	22
Salavan	Koutkeo Latthasombath	29
Savannakhet	Bolanan Chanthavong	20
Sekong	Thipphaphone Sisaveng	21
Vientiane	Phaivun Chanthavong	22
Vientiane Prefecture	Latikone Souksomphan	18
Xaisomboun	Soutthida Chanthalangsy	21
Xiangkhouang	Phetphachan Phanthalangsy	20

Withdrawn contestant

- Oudomxay – Thienmaly Thammasit (29)
