= Miss Grand Laos 2023 =

4th edition of the Miss Grand Laos beauty pageant

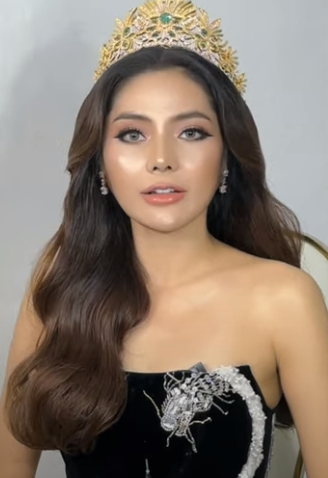
- Phetmany Philakhong, the winner of the contest
- Date: July 29, 2023
- Venue: National Convention Center (NCC), Vientiane
- Broadcaster: Facebook; Youtube
- Entrants: 18
- Placements: 11
- Winner: Phetmany Philakhong (Vientiane Prefecture)

Miss Grand Laos 2023 competition results by province
Color key:
Winner	4th runner-up
1st runner-up	Top 11
2nd runner-up	Unplaced
3rd runner-up	No representative

Miss Grand Laos 2023 (Lao: ມີສແກຣນລາວ 2023) was the fourth edition of the Miss Grand Laos beauty pageant, held on July 29, 2023, at the National Convention Center (NCC), Vientiane. Eighteen candidates, who have qualified for the national pageant through an online profile screening performed in March, of whom the representative of Vientiane Prefecture, Phetmany Philakhong, was announced the winner and was crowned by Miss Grand Laos 2022, Phoutsavanh Vongkhamxao of Vientiane, as her successor.

Philakhong later represented Laos in the international parent stage, Miss Grand International 2023, held in Vietnam on October 25 that year, and was placed among the top 20 finalists.

== Background ==
The applications for Miss Grand Laos 2023 were opened on June 18. All submitted applicants were then screened by the pageant organizer to determine the final 18 national candidates. Each qualified candidate was later assigned to represent one of the 18 country's provinces; the press conference was conducted on July 4.

== Result ==
Position	Candidate
Miss Grand Laos 2023	Vientiane Prefecture – Phetmany Philakhong
1st runner-up	Luang Namtha – Louise Chanthalangsy
2nd runner-up	Khammouane – Palyna Khampasouk^{[α]}
3rd runner-up	Savannakhet – Arisa Khennavong
4th runner-up	Xiangkhouang – Saythong Thammavong
Top 11	Champasak – Sirivimon Sirimoungkhoune
Top 11	Houaphanh – Somchit Phonephisit^{[β]}
Top 11	Luang Prabang – Thippavanh Vongkhamkeo
Top 11	Phongsaly – Malichai Singmavong
Top 11	Sainyabuli – Muithida Karanty
Top 11	Salavan – Pantavanh Dala
Note: 1. ^α Automatically qualified for the top 3 finalists round after winning a special award of Miss Popular Vote, regardless of the accumulation scores.; 2. ^β Automatically qualified for the top 11 semi-finalists round after winning a special award of Miss Popular Vote, regardless of the accumulation scores.

== Candidates ==
Eighteen candidates competed for the title of Miss Grand Laos 2023.

Province	Candidate	
Province	Romanized name	Lao name
Attapeu	Pithida Muangchanh	ພິທິດາ ເມືອງຈັນ
Bokeo	Lutdavanh Vannaphom	ລິດດາວັນ ວັນນະພົມ
Bolikhamsai	Souphansa Lardsamouth	ສຸພັນສາ ລາດຊະວົງ
Champasak	Sirivimon Sirimoungkhoune	ສິລິວິມອນ ສິລິມຸງຄຸນ
Houaphanh	Somchit Phonephisit	ສົມຈິດ ພອນພິສິດ
Khammouane	Palyna Khampasouk	ປາລີນາ ຄຳປາສຸກ
Luang Namtha	Louise Chanthalangsy	ຫລຸຍ ຈັນທະລັງສີ
Luang Prabang	Thipphavanh Vongkhamkeo	ທິບພະວັນ ວົງຄໍາແກ້ວ
Oudomxay	Mithuna Boundavong	ມິທູນາ ພັນທະວົງ
Phongsaly	Malichai Singmavong	ມາລິໄຊ ສິງມາວົງ
Sainyabuli	Muithida Karanty	ມູທິດາ ກາຣານຕີ
Salavan	Pantavanh Dala	ພັນທະວັນ ດາລາ
Savannakhet	Arisa Khennavong	ອາລິສາ ເຄນນາວົງ
Sekong	Ladsany Vongsavang	ລາດສະນີ ວົງສະຫວ່າງ
Vientiane	Tadam Soumounthong	ທາດາມ ສຸມຸນທອງ
Vientiane Prefecture	Phetmany Philakhong	ເພັດມະນີ ພິລາກອນ
Xaisomboun	Peeamphone Phasonthi	ພີມພອນ ພົນເສນາ
Xiangkhouang	Saythong Thammavong	ສາຍທອງ ທຳມະວົງ
