= Miss Grand Laos 2018 =

2nd Miss Grand Laos competition, beauty pageant edition

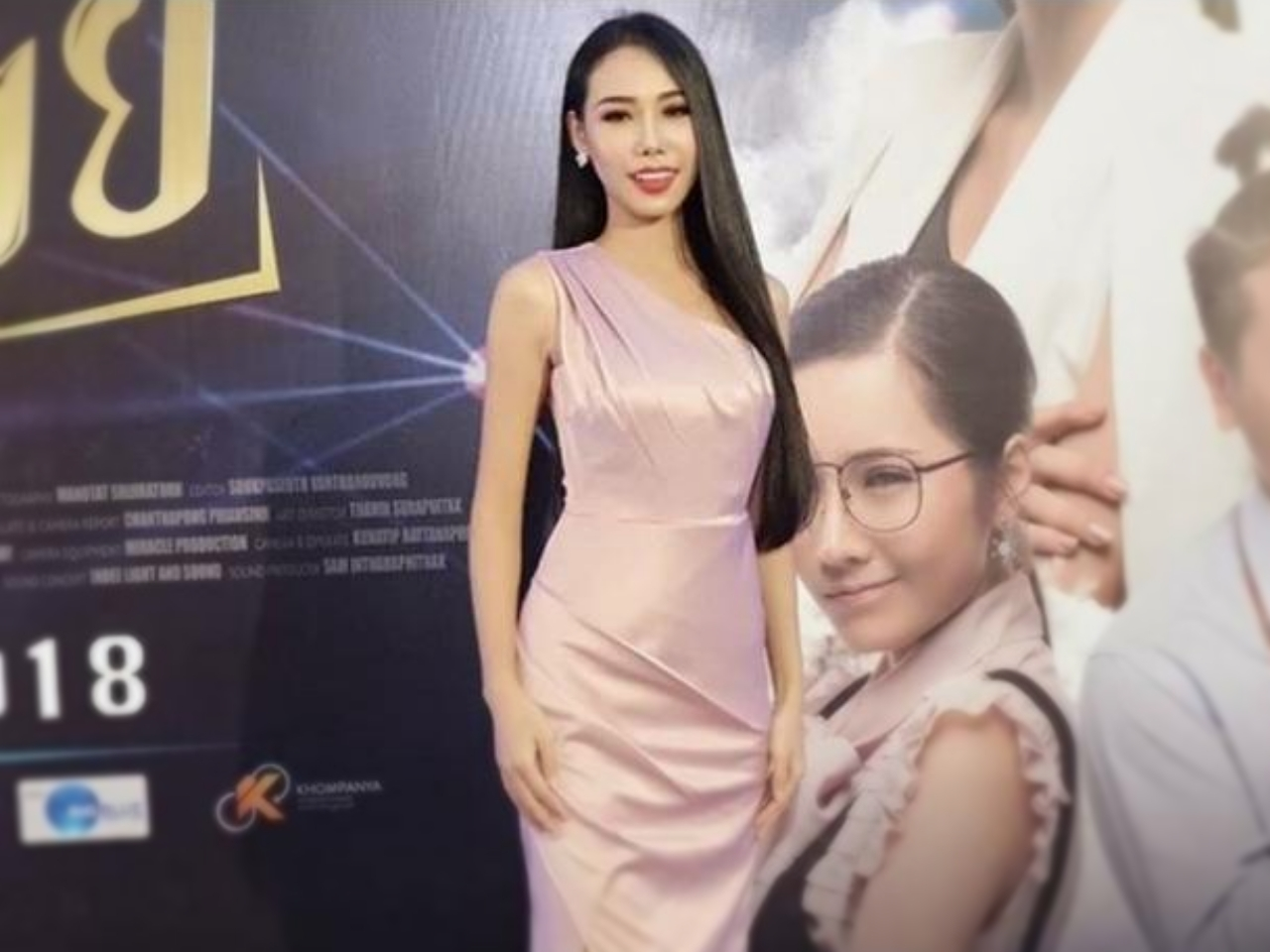
- Nobphalat Sikaiphak, Miss Grand Laos 2018
- Date: 24 March 2018
- Venue: ITECC Shopping Mall, Xaysetha, Vientiane
- Broadcaster: Lao National Television Channel 1; Facebook
- Entrants: 12
- Placements: 6
- Winner: Nobphalat Sikaiphak (Vientiane)
- Congeniality: Manoluck Phonyotha (Vientiane)

External videos
- Miss Grand Laos 2018 Grand Final Competition, on June 2, 2018, YouTube video

Miss Grand Laos 2018 (Lao: ມີສແກຣນລາວ 2018) was the second edition of the Miss Grand Laos beauty pageant, held on March 24, 2018, at the ITECC Shopping Mall in the district of Xaysetha, Vientiane. Twelve candidates competed for the title, and a twenty-year-old Banking Institute of LAO PDR student from Vientiane, Nobphalat Sikaiphak, was named the winner; she then represented the country at the Miss Grand International 2018 pageant in Myanmar, but was unplaced.

== Result ==
Position	Candidate
Miss Grand Laos 2018	Nobphalat Sykaiyphack
1st runner-up	Manika Soukvongsa
2ndrunner-up	Siliyaphone Xaphilom
Top 6	Linkhaysy Xaiyasouk; Manoluck Phonyotha; Manilak Croizierselakvivier
Special awards
Miss Beauty Skin	Siliyaphone Xaphilom
Miss Friendship	Manoluck Phonyotha

== Candidates ==
Twelve delegates competed for the title of Miss Grand Laos 2018.

1. Siliyaphone Xaphilom
2. Alounnee Savutephon
3. Linkhaysy Xaiyasouk
4. Mely Khamsithivong
5. Manoluck Phonyotha
6. Siliphone Khamphilavong
7. Manika Soukvongsa
8. Manilak Croizierselakvivier
9. Souphatta Phaichattavanh
10. Thippasone Chattouphonexai
11. Saiyphin Phaengmeuang
12. Nobphalat Sykaiyphack
