= Miss Grand Laos 2024 =

5th Miss Grand Laos beauty pageant

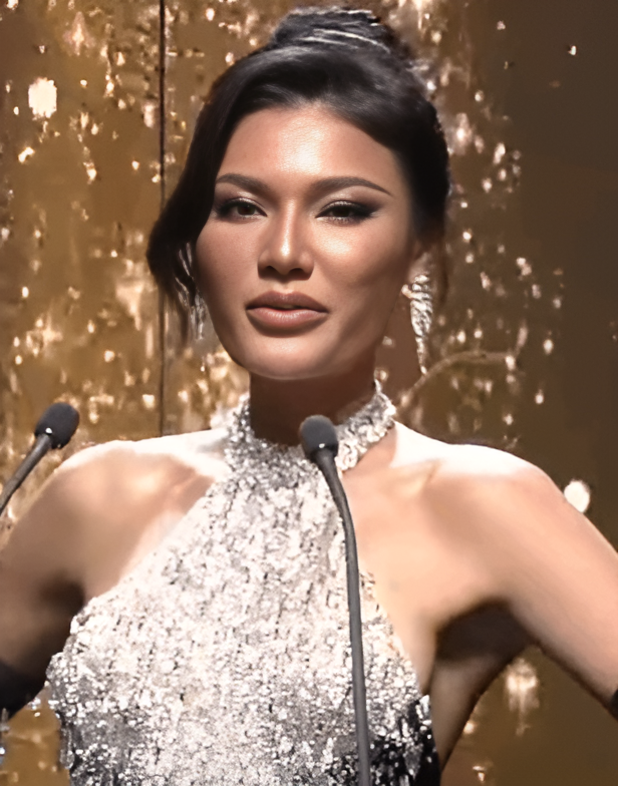
- Souksavanh Vongsomphou, the winner of the contest
- Date: August 25, 2024
- Presenters: Phaimany Lathsabanthao, Tonkham Phonchanhueang
- Venue: ITECC Shopping Mall, Xaysetha, Vientiane
- Broadcaster: Facebook; Youtube
- Entrants: 17
- Placements: 12
- Withdrawals: Vientiane
- Winner: Souksavanh Vongsomphou (Champasak)
- Congeniality: Souksavanh Vongsomphou (Champasak)
- Photogenic: Souksavanh Vongsomphou (Champasak)

Miss Grand Laos 2024 (Lao: ມີສແກຣນລາວ 2024) was the 5th edition of the Miss Grand Laos pageant, held on August 25, 2024, at the ITECC Shopping Mall in Xaysetha, Vientiane. Contestants from 17 provinces of Laos competed for the title.

At the end of the event, a 28-year-old model representing Champasak, Souksavanh Vongsomphou, was announced the winner. Vongsomphou represented the country in the international parent stage, Miss Grand International 2024, held in Thailand on October 25, 2024, where she was unplaced.

The edition was the first Miss Grand Laos organized by SV Trading Sole Co., Ltd and 78 Creation Sole Co., Ltd, who are also the organizers of this year's Miss Universe Laos pageant.

== Result ==
Miss Grand Laos 2024 competition result by province
Color key:
Winner	1st RU	2nd RU
3rd RU	4th RU	Top 8
Top 12	Unplaced	Withdrew

Position	Candidate
Winner	Champasak – Souksavanh Vongsomphou
1st runner-up	Vientiane Prefecture – Lothjana Khounnavong
2nd runner-up	Attapeu – Latsamee Kinnavong
3rd runner-up	Bolikhamsai – Phavina Mounvongsa
4th runner-up	Xiangkhouang – Thipphavanh Inthavong
Top 8	Bokeo – Phonvilay Aphaiyavong; Houaphanh – Maxar Yathortouyongkaiy; Xaisomboun – Littar Moungkhounvongchampa
Top 12	Khammouane – Duangphachan Bualapha; Luang Namtha – Soudthida Onkeo; Savannakhet – Touny Chanthavong; Sainyabuli – Louknam Chatchavan
Special awards
Miss Photogenic	Champasak – Souksavanh Vongsomphou
Body Perfect	Bolikhamsai – Phavina Mounvongsa
Best In Swimsuit	Vientiane Prefecture – Lothjana Khounnavong
Miss Perfect Skin	Luang Namtha – Soudthida Onkeo
Best National Costume	Bolikhamsai – Phonvilay Aphaiyavong
Miss Grand Rising Star	Xiangkhouang – Thipphavanh Inthavong
Miss Supermodel Laos	Attapeu – Latsamee Kinnavong
Miss Congeniality	Champasak – Souksavanh Vongsomphou

== Contestants ==
Eighteen candidates were initially confirmed, but one withdrew, making the final of seventeen contestants.

Province	Candidate		Ref.
Province	Romanized name	Lao name	Ref.
Attapeu	Latsamee Kinnavong	ລັດສະຫມີ ກິນນະວົງ	
Bokeo	Phonvilay Aphaiyavong	ພອນວິໄລ ອາໄພຍະວົງ	
Bolikhamsai	Phavina Mounvongsa	ພາວິນ້າ ມູນວົງສາ	
Champasak	Souksavanh Vongsomphou	ສຸກສະຫວັນ ວົງຊົມພູ	
Houaphanh	Maxar Yathortouyongkaiy	ມາຊ້າ ຢາທໍຕູ້ຍົງກາຍ	
Khammouane	Duangphachan Bualapha		
Luang Namtha	Soudthida Onkeo	ສຸດທິດາ ອ່ອນແກ້ວ	
Luang Prabang	Phoutsavang Invong	ພຸດສະຫວ່າງ ອິນວົງ	
Oudomxay	Silichid Philakhong		
Phongsaly	Soutnary Inyalard		
Sainyabuli	Louknam Chatchavan	ລຳຄອນ ຄູນສະຫວັນ	
Salavan	Poutavanh Chantaramixay	ພູຕາວັນ ຈັນທາລາມີໄຊ	
Savannakhet	Touny Chanthavong		
Sekong	Amanda Phenyalath		
Vientiane Prefecture	Lothjana Khounnavong	ລົດຈະນາ ກຸນນາວົງ	
Xaisomboun	Littar Moungkhounvongchampa	ລິດຕ້າ ມຸງຄຸນວົງຈຳປາ	
Xiangkhouang	Thipphavanh Inthavong	ທິບພາວັນ ອິນທະວົງ	

Withdrawn contestant

- Vientiane – Cingling Keomanyvong (ຊິງຫລິງ ແກ້ວມະນີວົງ)
