= Sisaket (disambiguation) =

Sisaket is the capital of Sisaket Province, Thailand.

Sisaket, Srisaket, Sri Saket, Si Saket or Si Sa Ket may also refer to:

- Sisaket province, a province in Northeast Thailand
  - Sisaket F.C., an association football club
- Mueang Sisaket district, the seat of the capital district
- Wat Si Saket, a Buddhist temple in Vientiane, Laos

== See also ==
- Sāketa, another name for Ayodhya, India
- Saket (Delhi), a neighborhood of Delhi, India
