= Miss Grand Laos 2017 =

1st Miss Grand Laos competition, beauty pageant edition

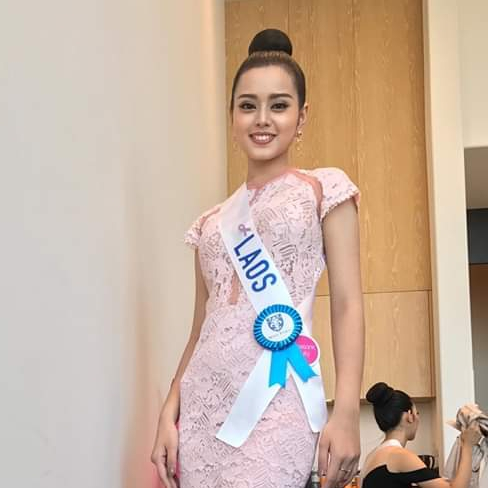
- Phounsup Phonyotha, 1st runner-up Miss Grand Laos 2017
- Date: 15 July 2017
- Venue: ITECC Shopping Mall, Xaysetha, Vientiane
- Broadcaster: Lao National Television Channel 1; Facebook
- Entrants: 17
- Placements: 10
- Winner: Chinnaly Nolasing (Vientiane)
- Photogenic: Nidakone Chandalasane (Vientiane)

External videos
- Miss Grand Laos 2017 Grand Final Competition, on July 22, 2017 (Part 1), YouTube video
- Miss Grand Laos 2017 Grand Final Competition, on July 22, 2017 (Part 2), YouTube video
- Miss Grand Laos 2017 Grand Final Competition, on July 22, 2017 (Part 3), YouTube video

Miss Grand Laos 2017 (Lao: ມີສແກຣນລາວ 2017) was the inaugural edition of the Miss Grand Laos beauty pageant, held on July 15, 2017, at the ITECC Shopping Mall in the district of Xaysetha, Vientiane. Seventeen candidates who qualified for the national stage through an audition competed for the right to represent the country at Miss Grand International 2017, and an eighteen-year-old Psychologist student from Vientiane, Chinnally Nolasing, was named the winner and received a cash prize of ₭N50 million kip as the reward. Nolasing then took part in the aforementioned international pageant in Vietnam, where she was placed among the top 20 finalists.

In addition to the main winner, all pageant runners-up were assigned to represent the country at other international contests, including Miss International 2017, Miss Supranational 2017, and Miss China-Asean Etiquette.

The pageant was managed by Miss Laos Company of Hongkham Souvannavong. The grand final of the contest was live-transmitted to the audience nationwide via national television, TV Laos HD, as well as to the worldwide audience on its parent international contest's Facebook page.

== Result ==
Position	Candidate
Miss Grand Laos 2017	Chinnally Nolasing
1st runner-up	Phounsup Phonnyotha
2ndrunner-up	Kitsada Vongsaisawad
3rd runner-up	Nidakone Chandalasane
4th runner-up	Sengsavanh Sihalath
Top 10	Phanthasone Chittaphonh; Chandalany Luangchandalavong; Wilaphone Khankeo; Soukphapeng Champavilay; Souksavanh Luanglath
Special awards
Miss Charming	Phounsup Phonnyotha
Miss Friendship	Wilaphone Khankeo
Miss Photogenic	Nidakone Chandalasane
Miss Popular Vote	Chinnally Nolasing
Miss Beuati Makup	Soukphapeng Champavilay

== Candidates ==
Seventeen delegates competed for the title of Miss Grand Laos 2017.

1. Nidakone Chandalasane
2. Boualin Vannakone
3. Phanthasone Chittaphonh
4. Soutdavone Pataphan
5. Sengsavanh Sihalath
6. Kanlaya Thoummakesone
7. Chandalany Luangchandalavong
8. Angkhana Vongsavanh
9. Anouxa Latthammavong
10. Pavina (withdrew)
11. Watthana Xayyavong
12. Wilaphone Khankeo
13. Phounsup Phonnyotha
14. Soukphapeng Champavilay
15. Lamavadee Mahanousith (withdrew)
16. Kitsada Vongsaisawad
17. Douangdy Phouangphet
18. Souksavanh Luanglath
19. Chinnally Nolasing
20. Phoutthasone Sidavanh (withdrew)
