= Lao National Museum =

Museum in Vientiane, Laos

Coordinates: 17°58′1″N 102°36′26″E

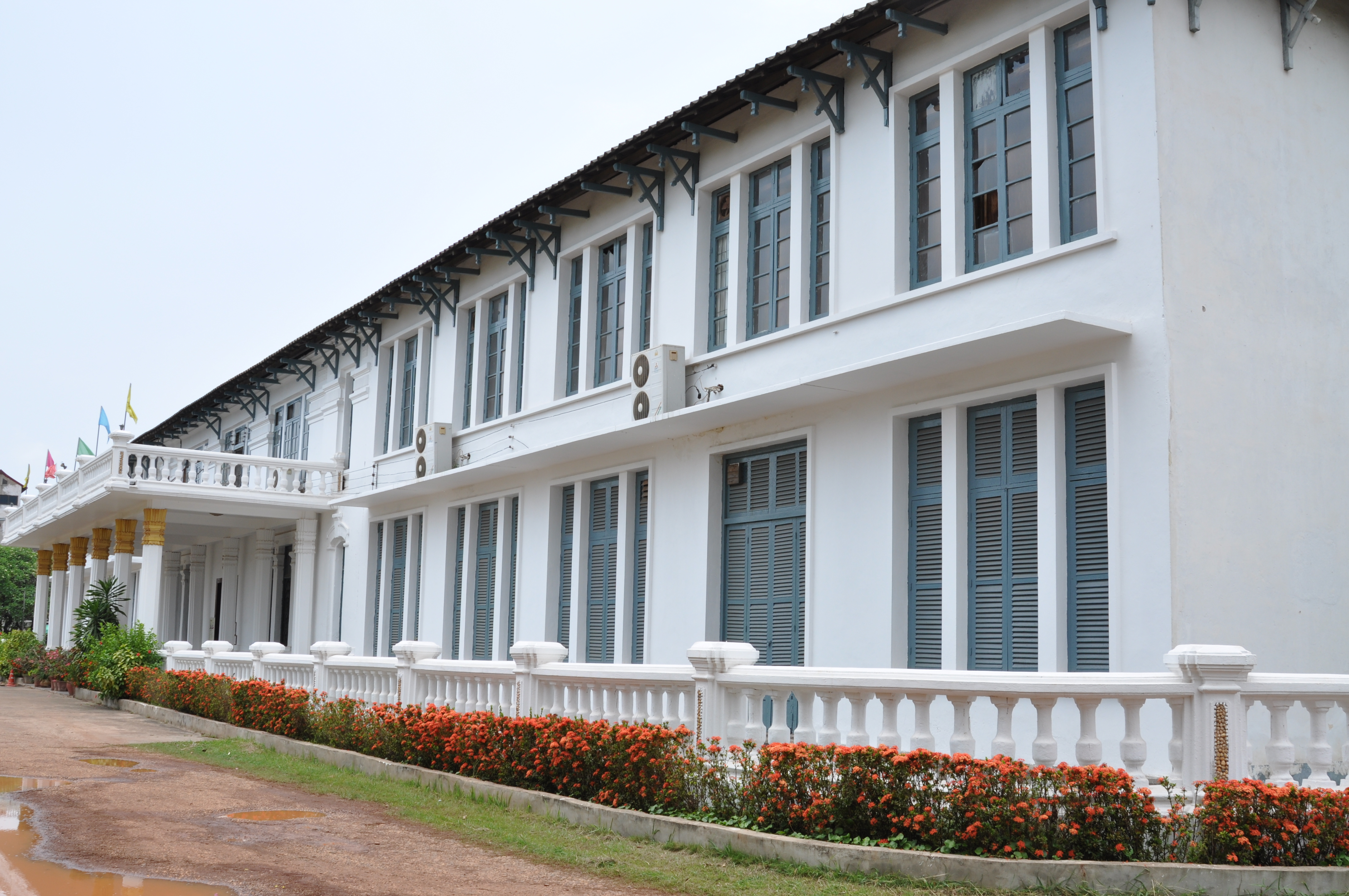
Lao National Museum

The Lao National Museum is a building located in Vientiane, the capital of Laos. The structure was originally built in 1925 as the French governor's residence and today presents the history of the nation, highlighting the Lao people's struggle to free the country from foreign occupation. It is located on Samsenthai road, opposite the cultural hall. In 2007, the United States donated a grant to help develop the building. It was revamped in the 2010s to include artifacts ranging from prehistory to the present day.

== Literature ==
- Lenzi, Iola (2004). Museums of Southeast Asia. Singapore: Archipelago Press. p. 200. ISBN 978-981-4068-96-3.
