= Miss Grand Laos 2022 =

3rd Miss Grand Laos competition, beauty pageant edition

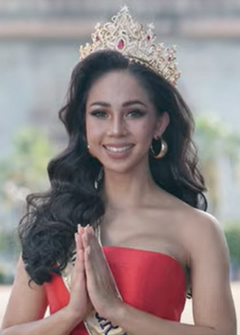
- Phoutsavanh Vongkhamxao, Miss Grand Laos 2022
- Date: 27 August 2022
- Venue: Crowne Plaza Hotel, Vientiane
- Broadcaster: Facebook
- Entrants: 20
- Placements: 11
- Winner: Phoutsavanh Vongkhamxao (Vientiane)
- Congeniality: Louise Chanthalangsy (Vientiane)
- Photogenic: Thanaphone Kittiyavong (Vientiane)

External videos
- Miss Grand Laos 2022 Grand Final Competition, on August 28, 2022, YouTube video

Miss Grand Laos 2022 (Lao: ມີສແກຣນລາວ 2022) was the third edition of the Miss Grand Laos beauty pageant, held on August 27, 2022, at the Crowne Plaza Hotel, located in the country's capital, Vientiane. Twenty contestants, who qualified for the national pageant through an audition round held earlier on July 10, competed for the title, and a twenty-five-year-old Lao Development Bank personnel, Phoutsavanh Vongkhamxao was named the winner, and received rewards of ₭100 million Kip in cash, Lao Airlines flights, and others. Vongkhamxao later represented the country at the Miss Grand International 2022 in Indonesia but was unplaced.

== Background ==
After three years of hiatus due to the COVID-19 pandemic, the Miss Grand Laos contest was brought back by a Laotian make-up artist based in Thailand, Saikeo Sidavong, who has served as the director of the pageant since 2019. An application was officially opened in early 2022, then the initial profile screening was done virtually by an organizer, and the qualified applicants were invited to attend an actual audition in Vientiane on July 10, 2022, to select the final 20 candidates, who were officially revealed in the press conference held on July 19, which was also attended by the top 10 finalists of Miss Grand Thailand 2022 as well as the president of Miss Grand International, Nawat Itsaragrisil.

The preliminary round of the contest was held on August 20 to determine the top 10 finalists, also at the Crowne Plaza Hotel. In addition to such an event, the national costume contest was also held, in which the winning costume was later worn by Miss Grand Laos 2022 winner, Phoutsavanh Vongkhamxao, during the national costume competition of the Miss Grand International 2022 pageant in Indonesia.

== Result ==
=== Main placements ===
Position	Candidate
Miss Grand Laos 2022	Phoutsavanh Vongkhamxao
1st runner-up	Soukanya Soulivong
2nd runner-up	Chitta Thipphonephosy^{[α]}
3rd runner-up	Kittima Khanthaphengxai
4th runner-up	Chindavan Saentavy
Top 11	Phitsamai Phonesanith; Namthip Paphan; Thanaphone Kittiyavong; Jintana Thidapone; Alisa Khounkham; Louise Chanthalangsy^{[β]}

=== Special awards ===
Tiltle		Candidate
Best Creative Costume	Winner	Koudkeo Latthasombat
Best Creative Costume	1st runner-up	Thittavanh Xaiyavong
Best Creative Costume	2nd runner-up	Louise Chanthalangsy
Miss JDB Bank		Chitta Thipphonephosy
Miss JDB Bank		Louise Chanthalangsy
Miss JDB Bank		Phitsamai Phonesanith
Modern Trade Sweetheart		Louise Chanthalangsy
Miss Laos Ford City		Chindavan Saenthavy
Miss Face of Beauty		Soukanya Soulivong
Miss Congeniality		Louise Chanthalangsy
Miss Photogenic		Thanaphone Kittiyavong
Miss Popular Vote		Chitta Thipphonephosy^{[α]}
Miss Popularity		Chindavan Saenthavy
Miss Loca Laos		Chitta Thipphonephosy
Miss Soie		Louise Chanthalangsy
Best Smile		Chitta Thipphonephosy
Charming Smile		Soukanya Soulivong
Best Personality		Phoutsavanh Vongkhamxao
Best Evening Gown		Soukanya Soulivong

Note
1. ^α Automatically qualified for the top 11 finalists round after winning a special award, Miss Popular Vote, regardless of the accumulation scores.
2. ^β Qualified for the top 11 finalists round after being chosen by the president of Miss Grand Laos as a fast-track winner, Boss Choice.

== Candidates ==
Twenty delegates competed for the title of Miss Grand Laos 2022.

1. Phitsamai Phonesanith
2. Namthip Paphan
3. Nalinthone Fongsy
4. Thipphavanh Xayyasarn
5. Moukdavanh Mane
6. Jintana Thidapone
7. Thanaphone Kittiyavong
8. Khamphoy Keopaserth
9. Chitta Thipphonephosy
10. Mili Yangjongtua
11. Koudkeo Latthasombat
12. Sounisa Xayyasane
13. Chindavan Saenthavy
14. Thittavanh Xaiyavong
15. Phoutsavanh Vongkhamxao
16. Soukanya Soulivong
17. Phonephilom Hansakda
18. Alisa Khounkham
19. Louise Chanthalangsy
20. Kittima Khanthaphengxai
