= Wat Si Saket =

Buddhist wat in Vientiane, Laos

- Lao: ວັດສີສະເກດ
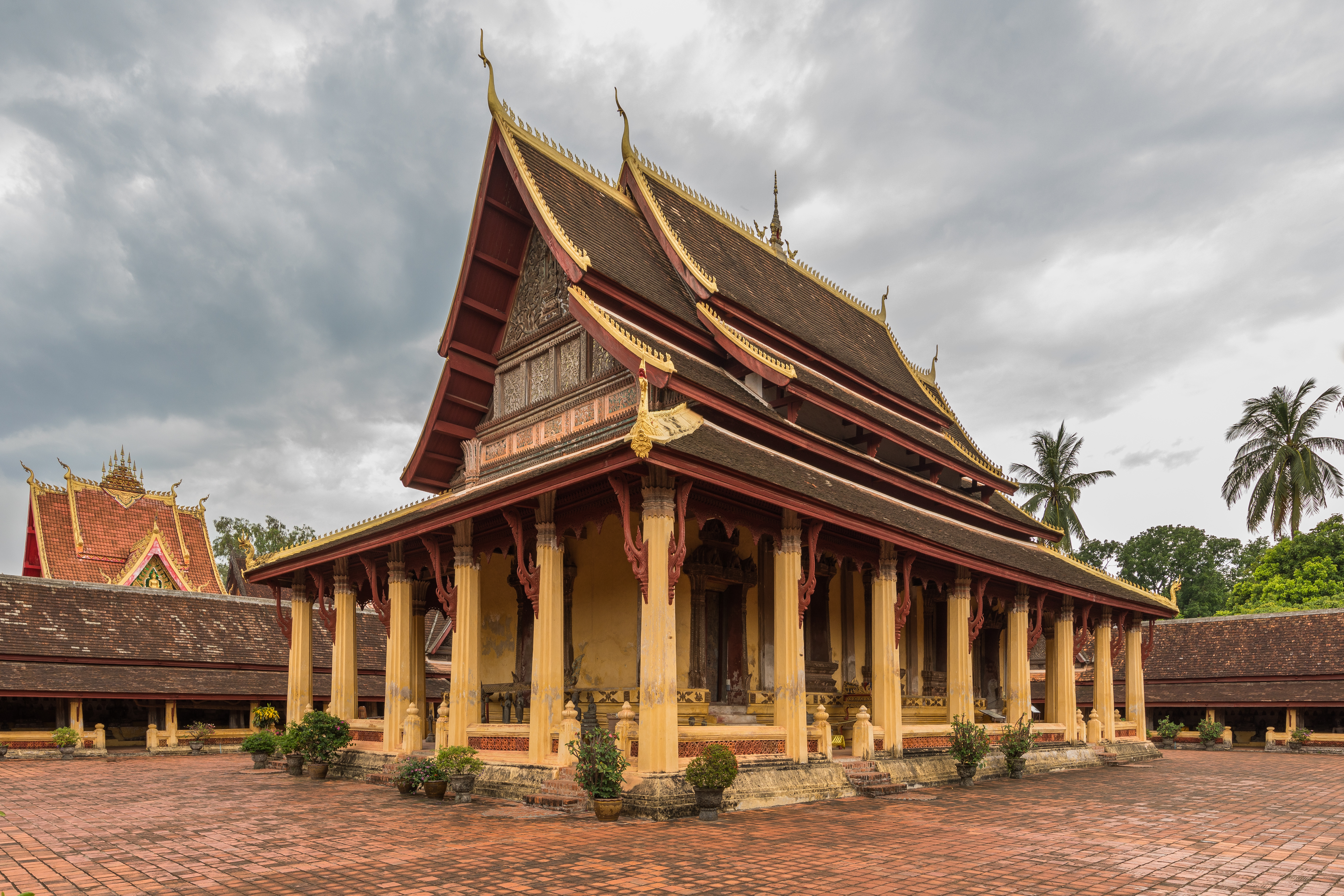
- Wat Si Saket

- Location within Laos

Religion
- Affiliation: Buddhism

Location
- Location: Lan Xang Road, Vientiane
- Country: Laos
- Coordinates: 17°57′47″N 102°36′42″E

Architecture
- Founder: 1818

Wat Si Saket (Lao: ວັດສີສະເກດ, pronounced [wāt sǐː.sā.kèːt]) is a Buddhist wat in Vientiane, Laos. It is situated on Lan Xang Road, on the corner with Setthathirat Road, to the northwest of Haw Phra Kaew, which formerly held the Emerald Buddha.

== Overview ==
Wat Si Saket was built in 1818 on the order of King Anouvong (Sethathirath V.) Si is derived from the Sanskrit title of veneration Sri, prefixed to the name of Wat Saket in Bangkok, which was renamed by Anouvong's contemporary, King Rama I. Wat Si Saket was built in a contemporary style of Buddhist architecture at the time, with a surrounding terrace and an ornate five-tiered roof, which may have kept it safe, since the armies of Siam that sacked Vientiane following Anouvong's rebellion in 1827 used the compound as their headquarters and lodging place. It may be the oldest temple still standing in Vientiane. The French colonial government restored Wat Si Saket in 1924 and again in 1930.

Wat Si Saket features a cloister wall with more than 2,000 ceramic and silver Buddha images. The temple also houses a museum.

== Gallery ==
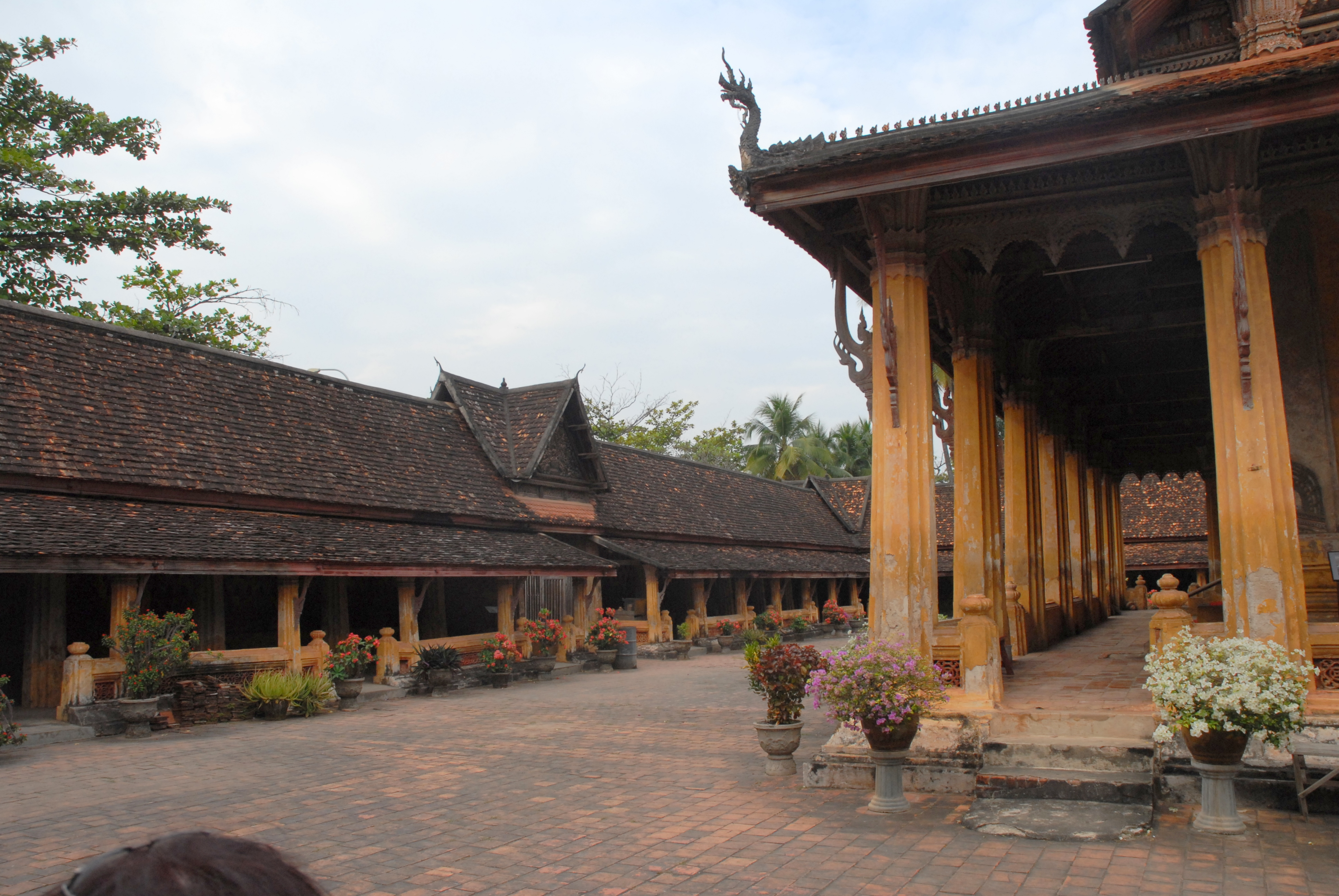
Wat Si Saket

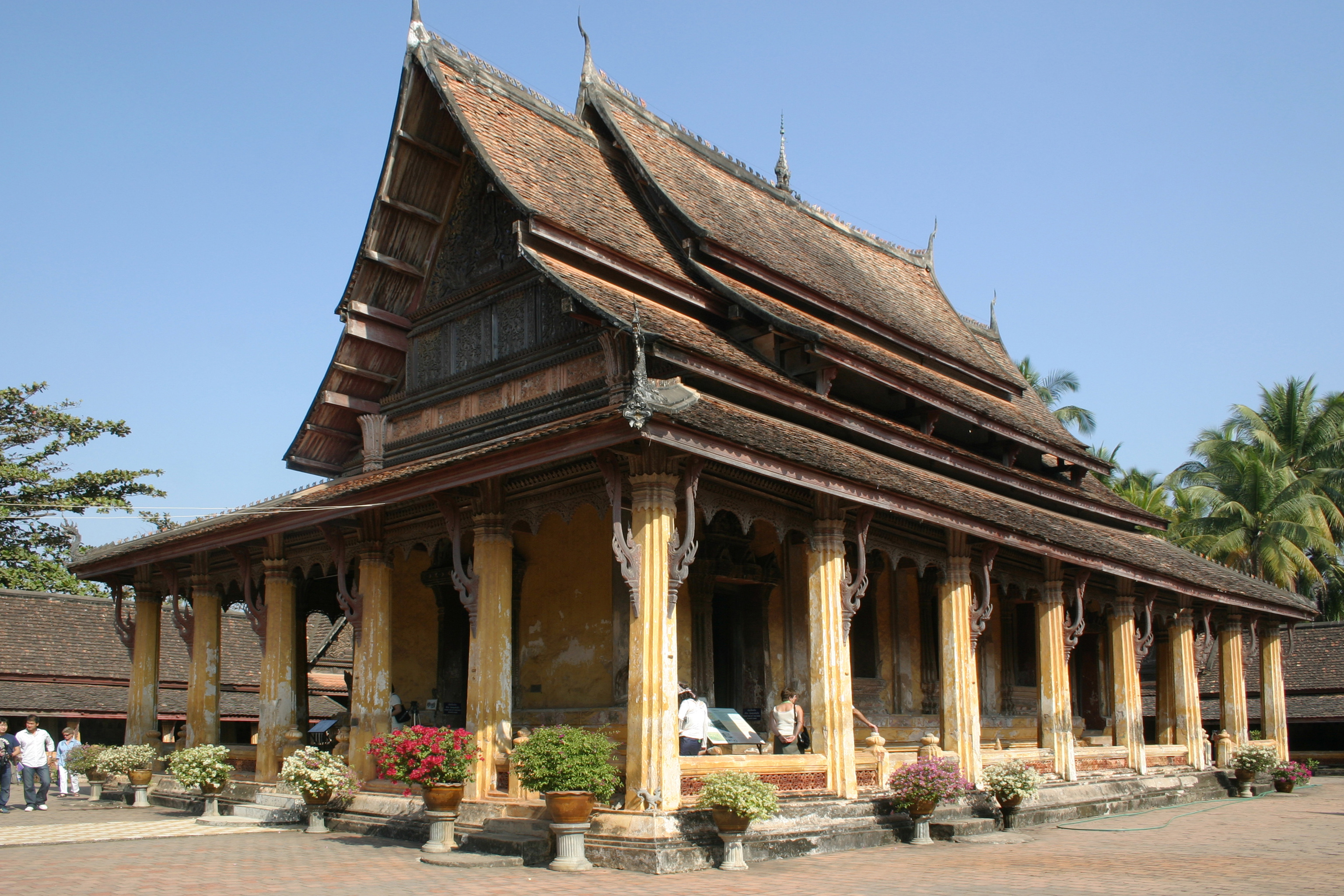
Sim

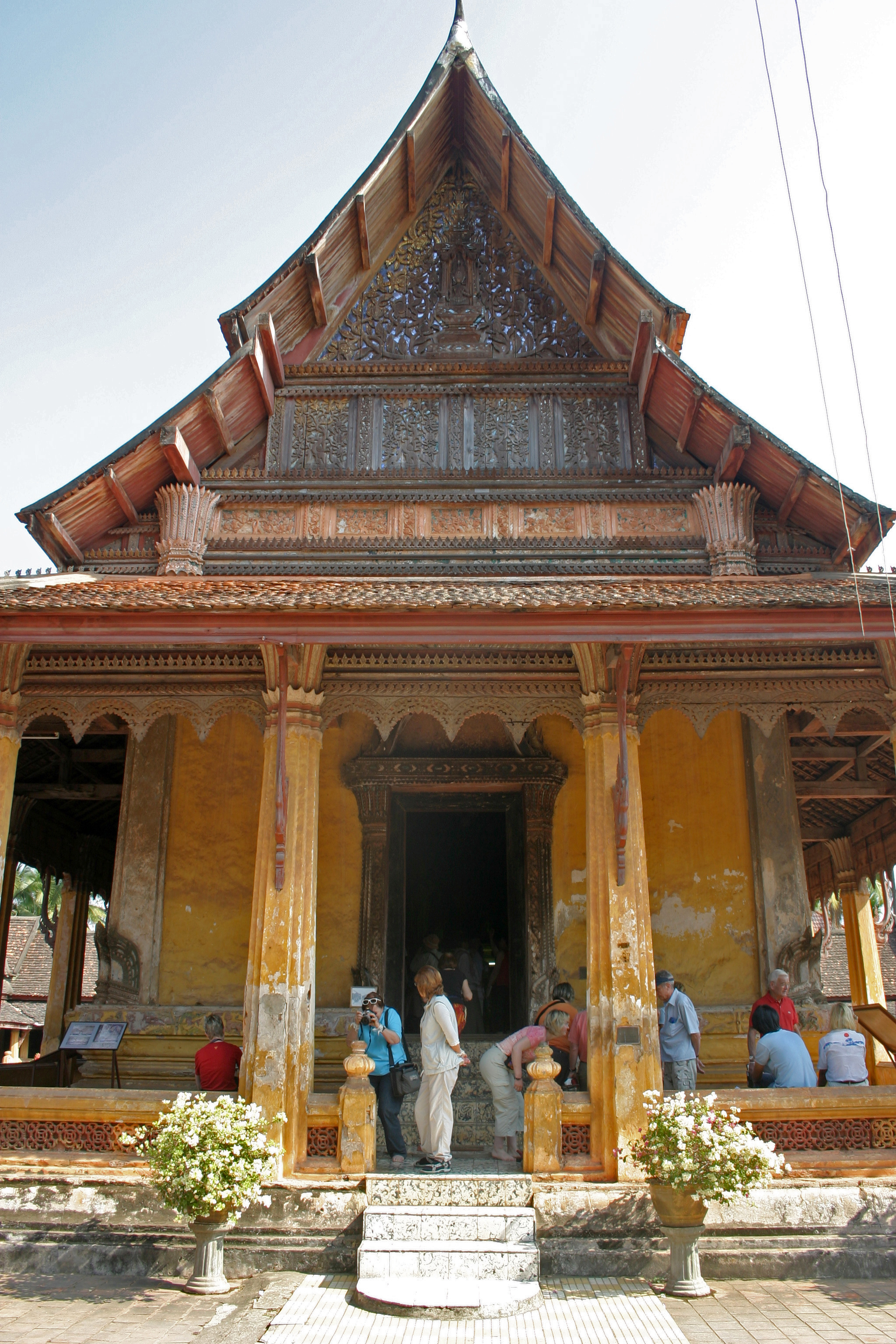
Sim

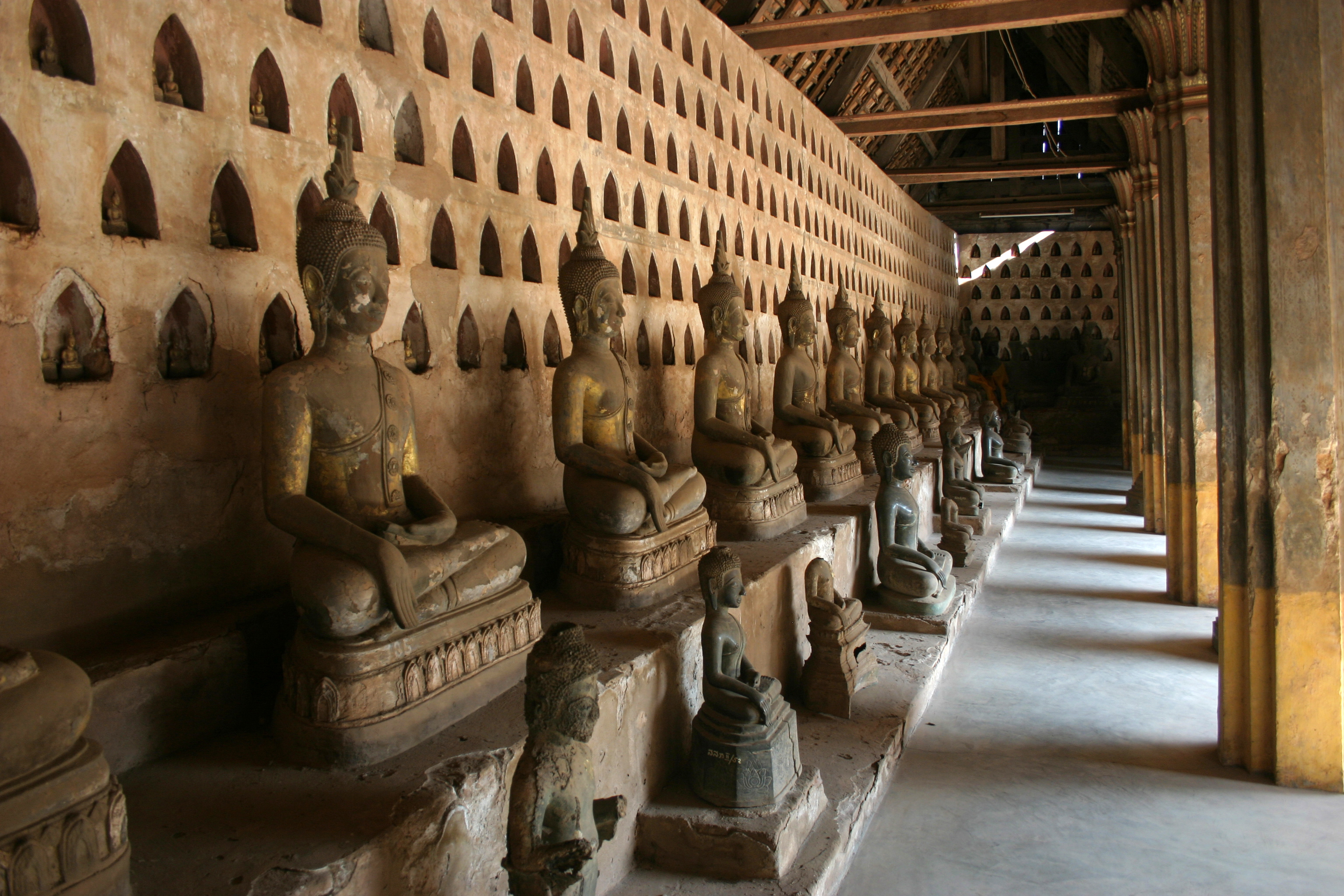
Buddha gallery

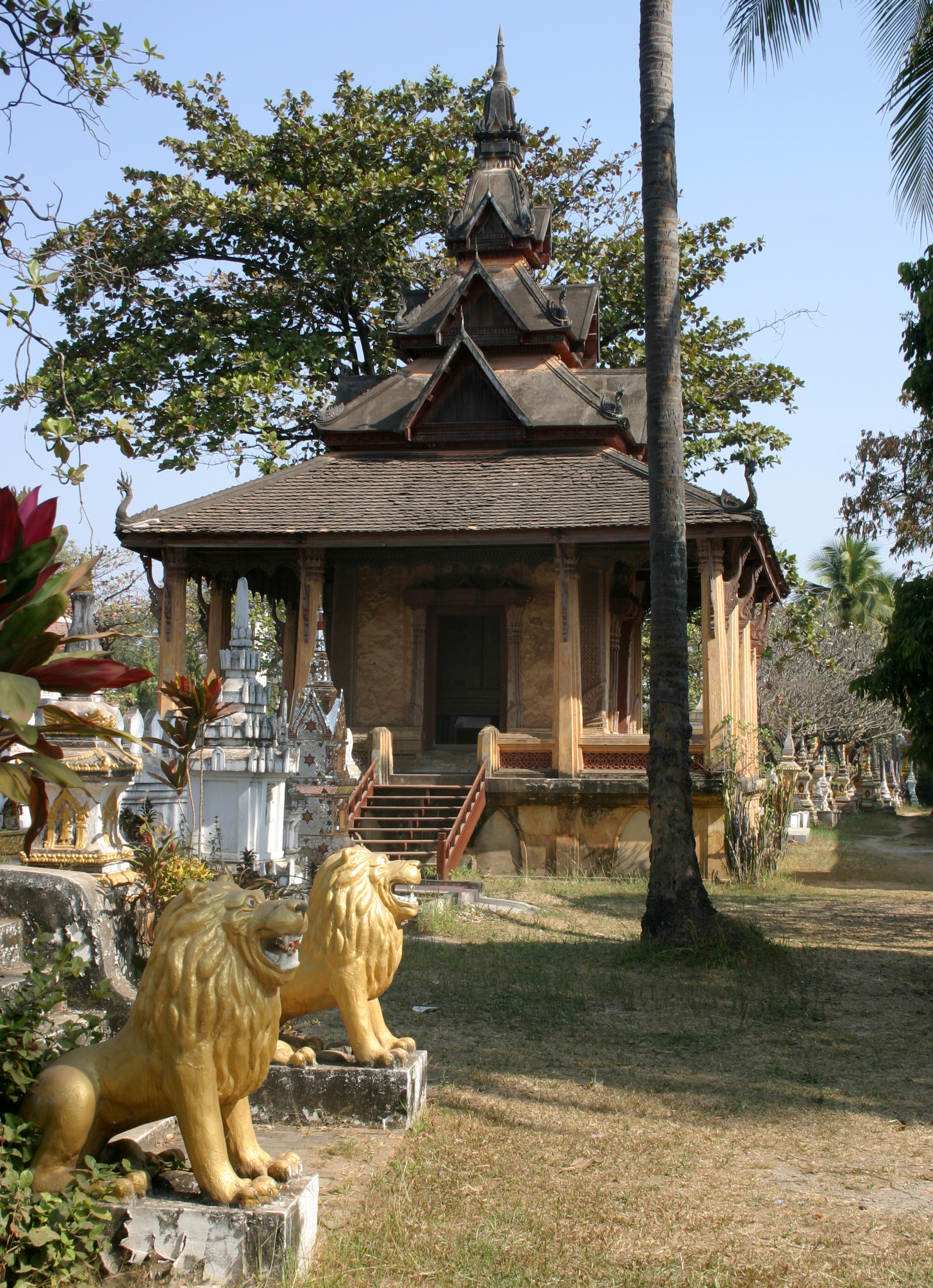
Library

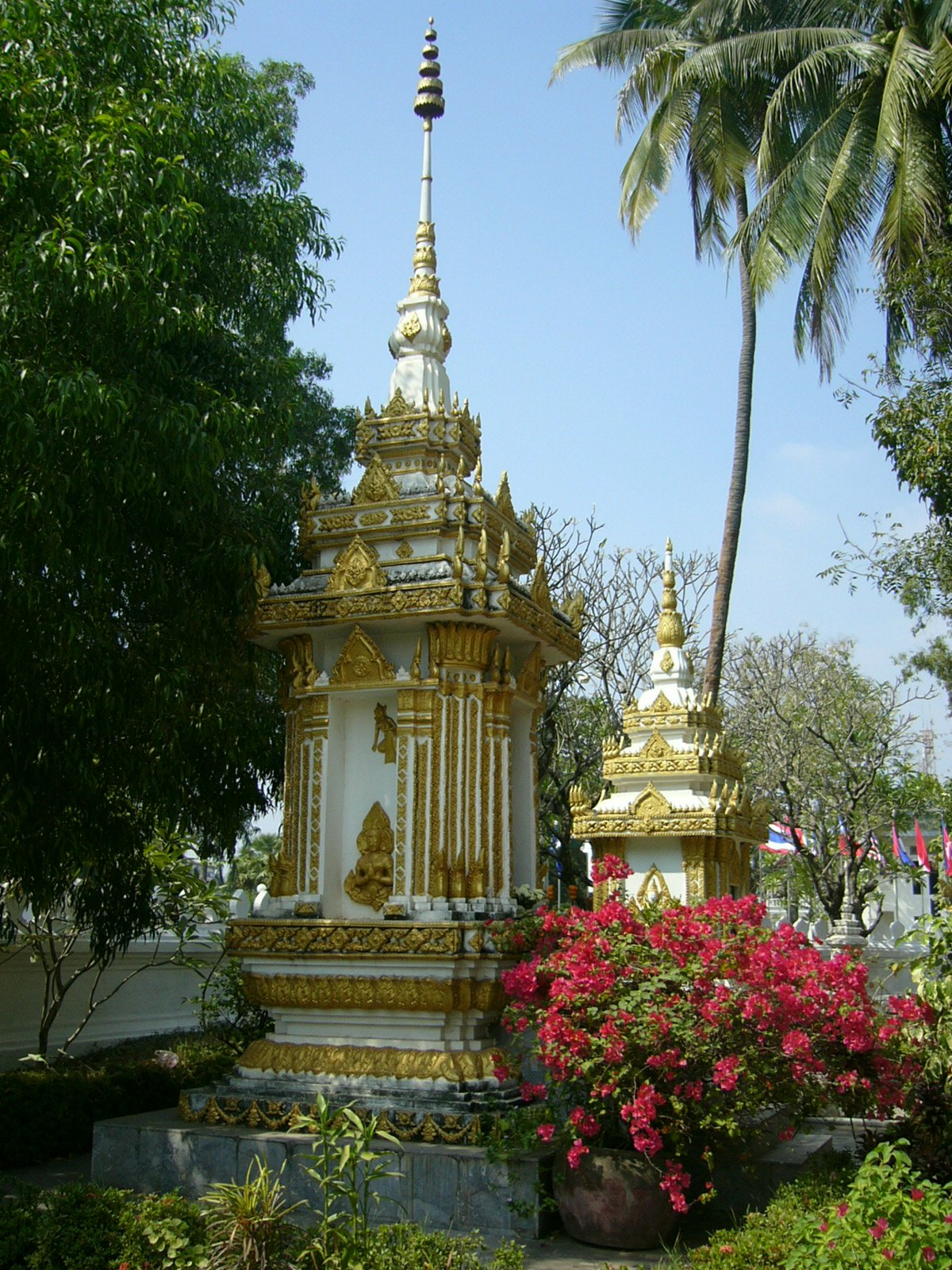
Towers

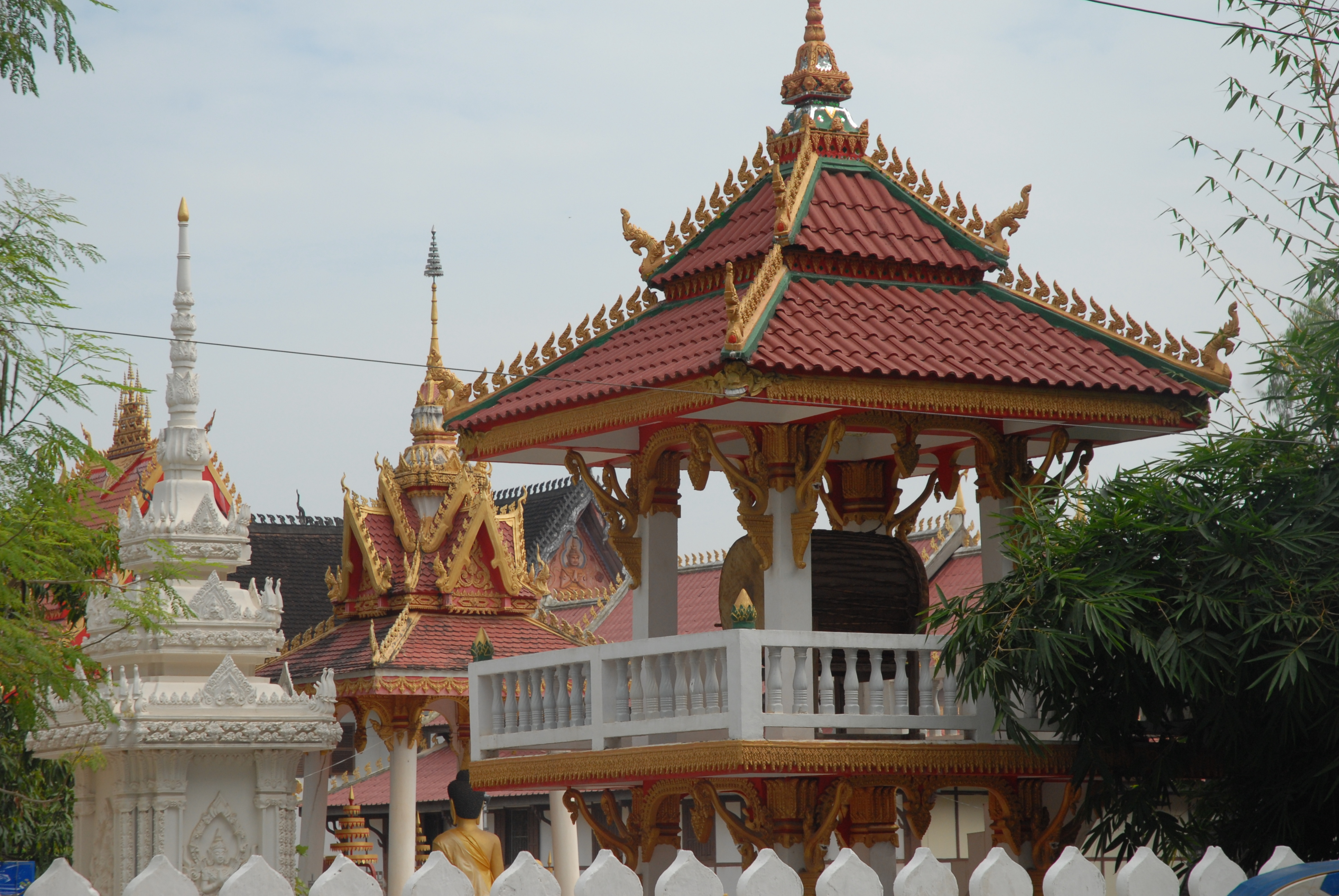
Drum tower

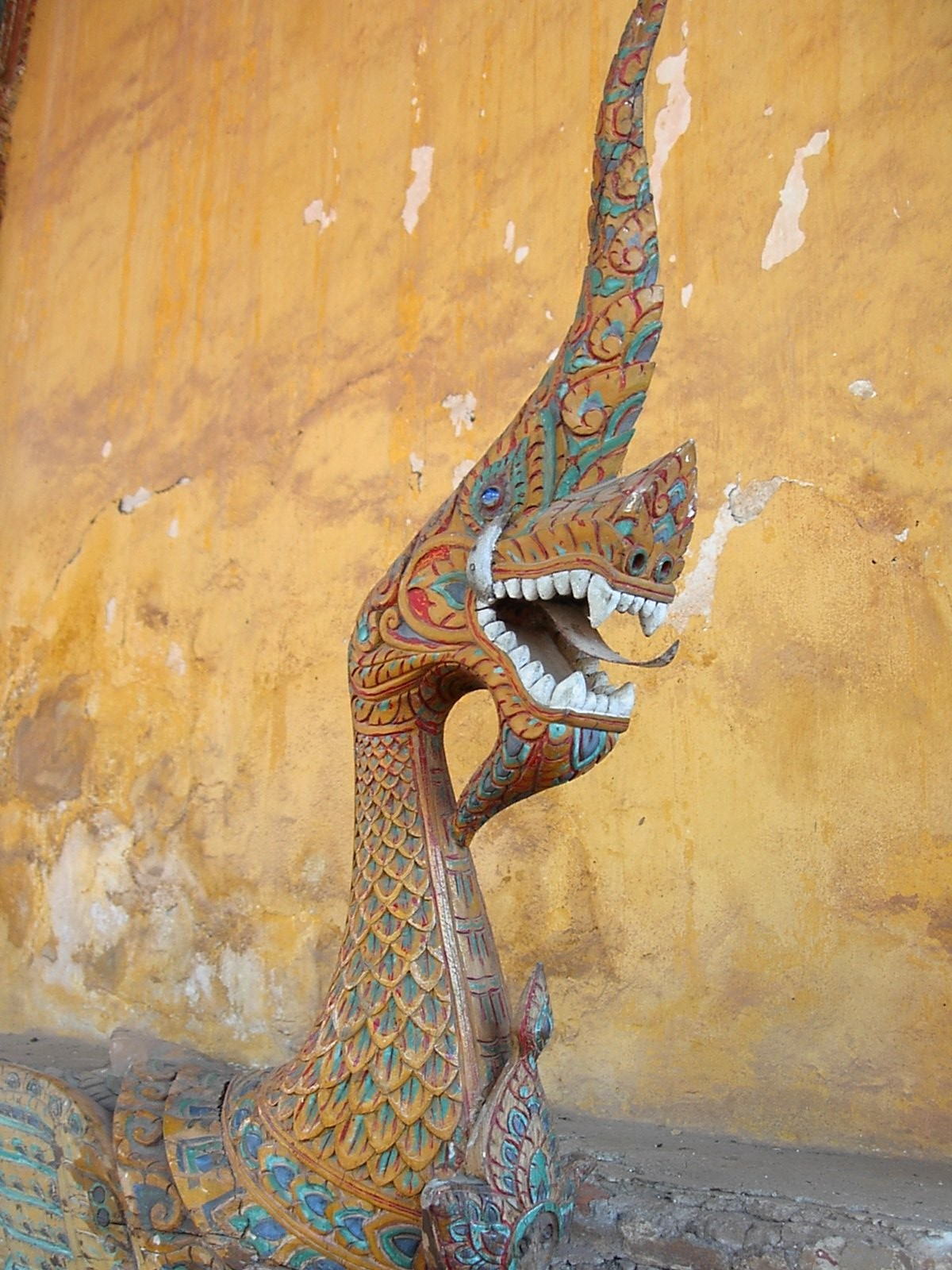
Nāga guarding entrance

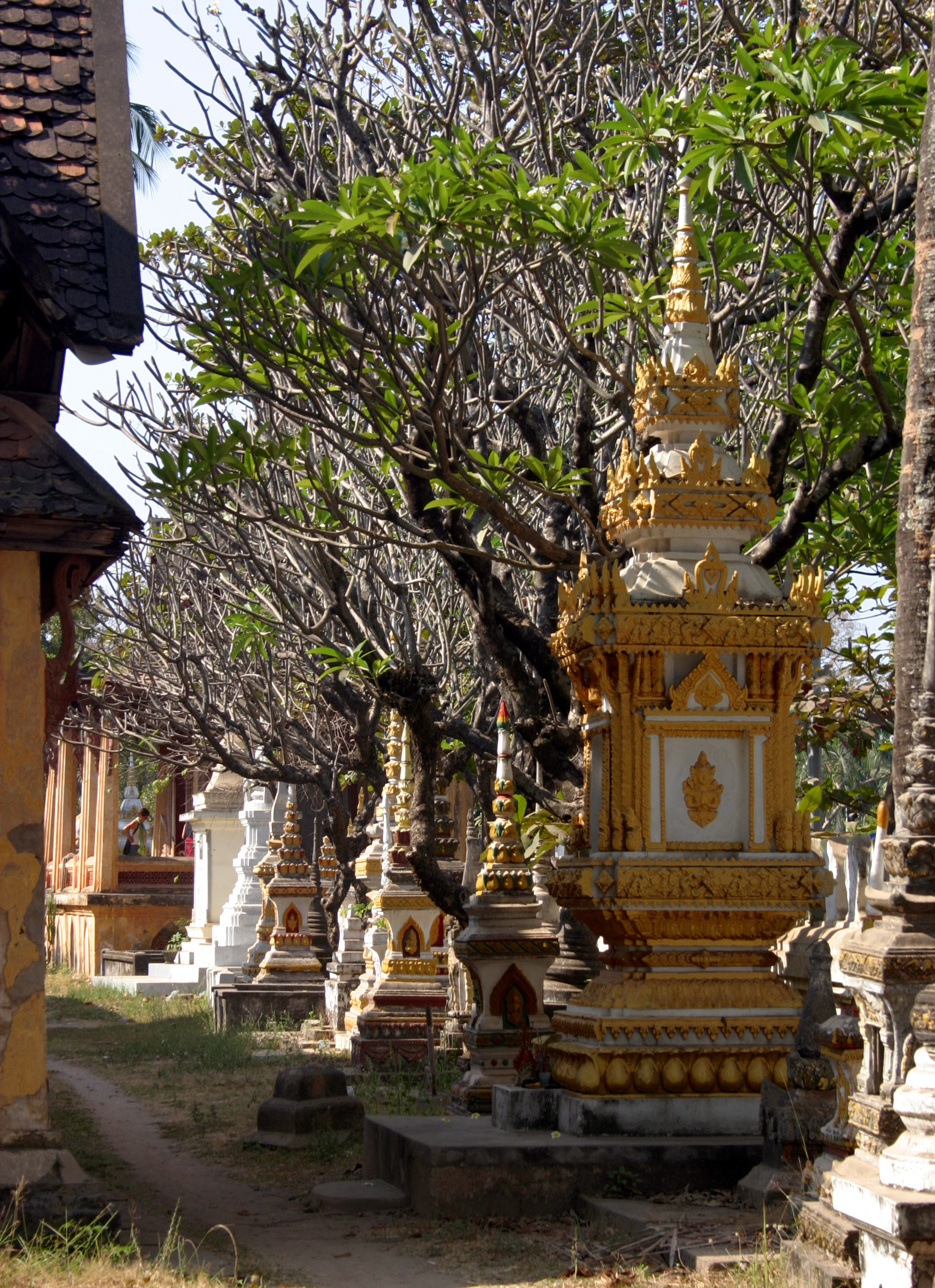
Tombs
