= Vientiane Prefecture =

Prefecture of Laos

Vientiane ນະຄອນຫຼວງວຽງຈັນ
- Prefecture
- Viengchan Prefecture
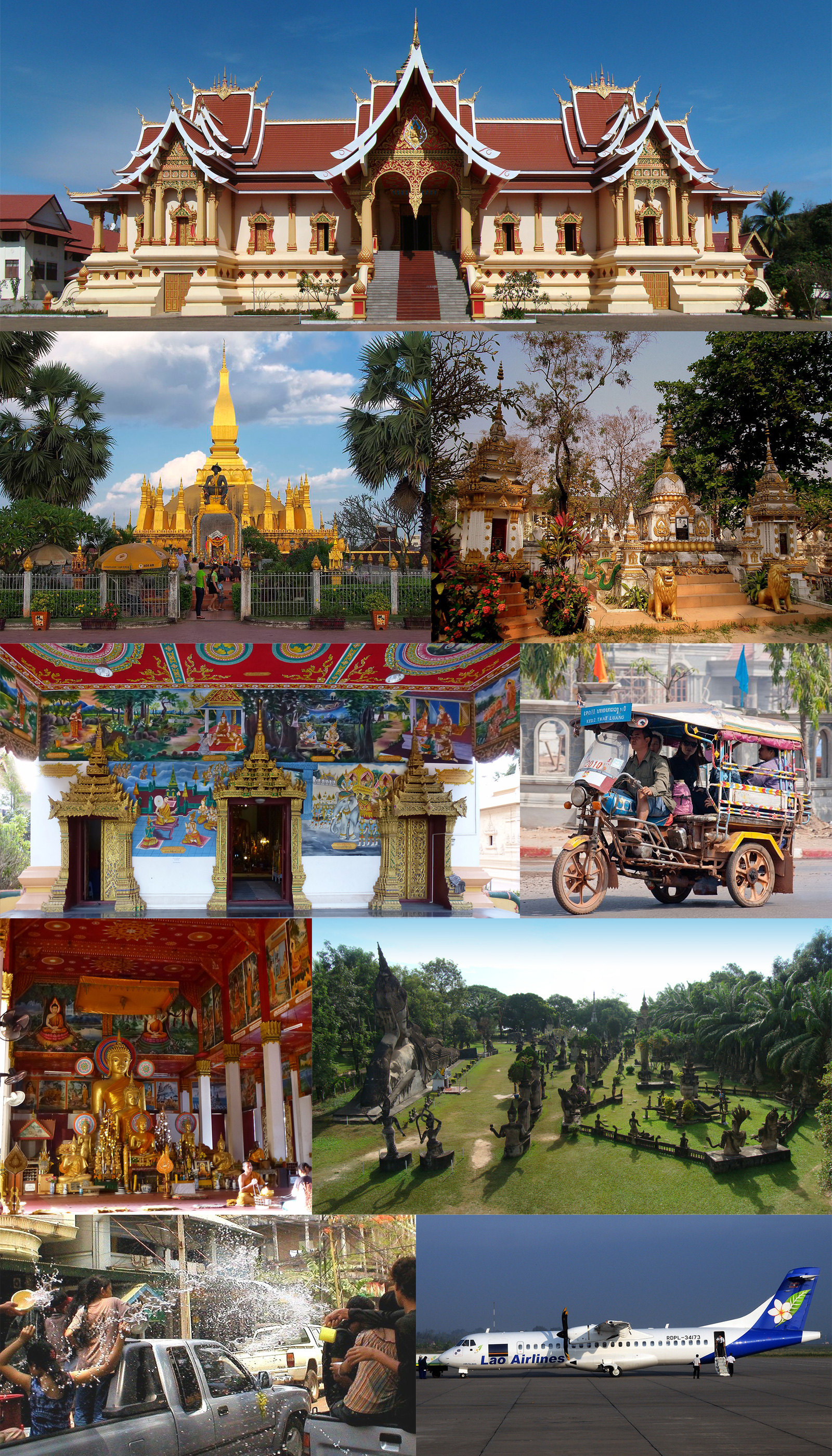

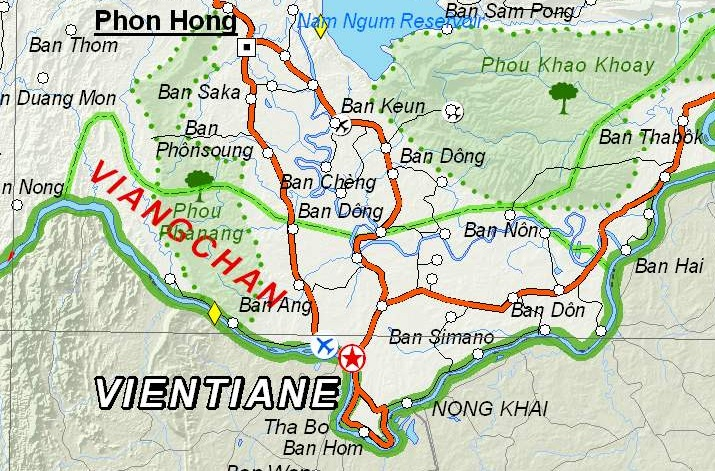
- Map of Vientiane Prefecture

- Location of Vientiane Prefecture in Laos
- Coordinates: 18°06′N 102°36′E
- Country: Laos
- Established: 1989
- Capital: Vientiane

Area
  - Total: 3,920 km^{2} (1,510 sq mi)

Population (2015 census)
  - Total: 820,924
  - Density: 209/km^{2} (542/sq mi)
- Time zone: UTC+7 (ICT)
- ISO 3166 code: LA-VT
- HDI (2017): ▲0.795 high · 1st

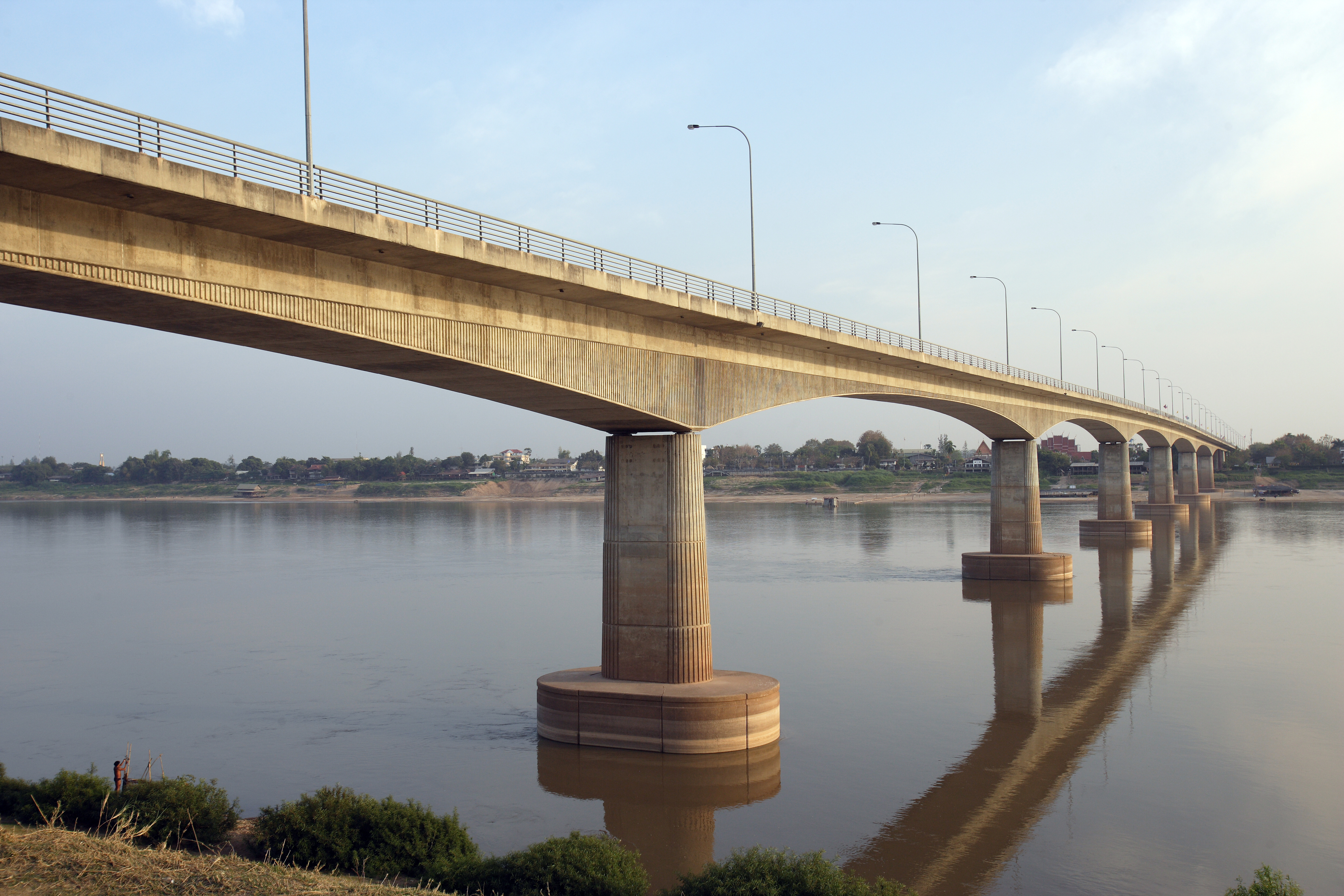
First Thai-Lao Friendship Bridge

New Laos National Stadium

Vientiane railway station

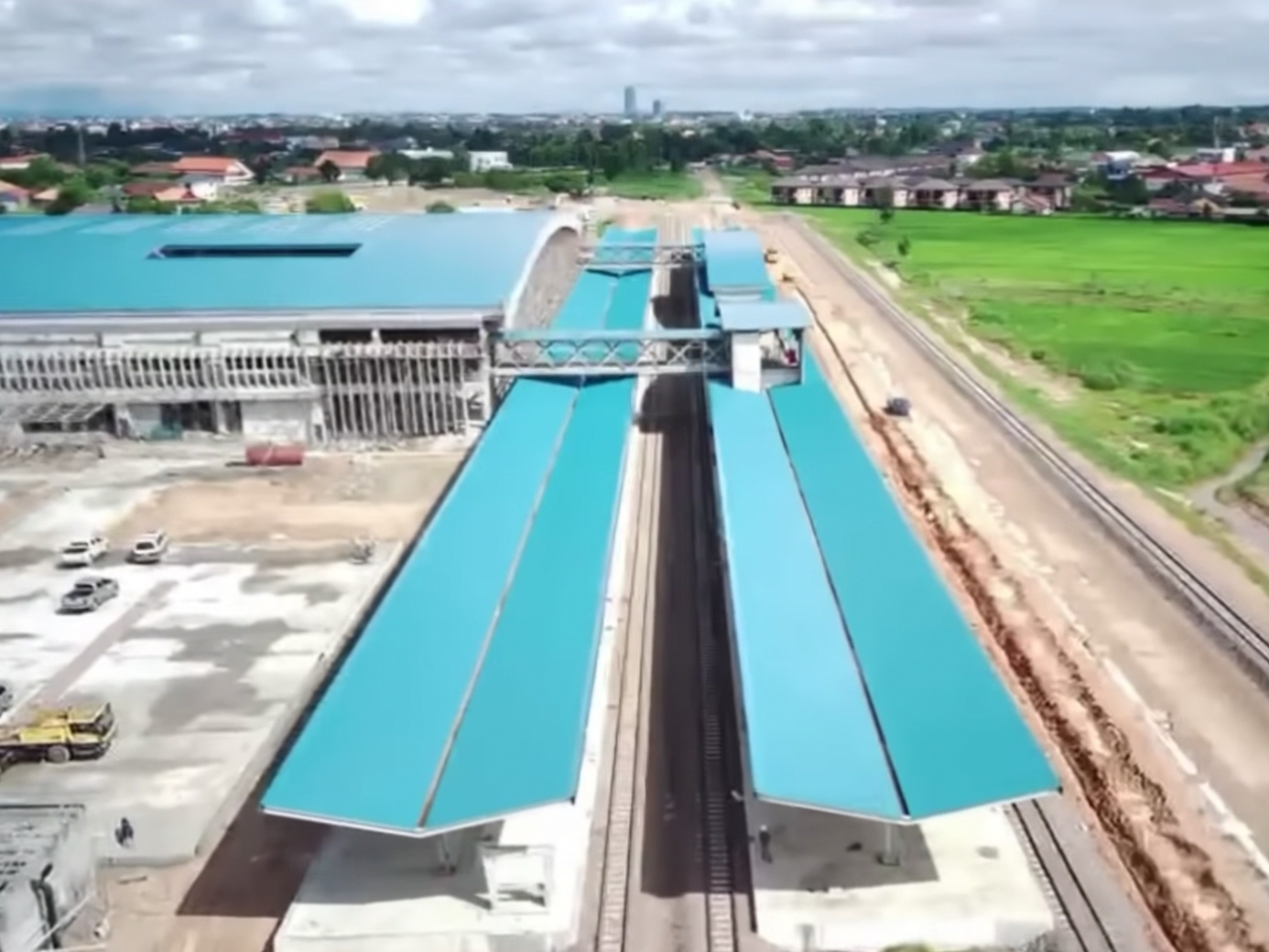
Khamsavath train station, Nong Khai–Khamsavath railway

Vientiane Prefecture (Lao: ນະຄອນຫຼວງວຽງຈັນ, Nakhôn Louang Viengchan, pronounced [nā(ʔ).kʰɔ́ːn lǔaŋ wíaŋ tɕàn], RTGS: Nakhon Luang Wiang Chan) is a prefecture of Laos, in northwest Laos. The national capital, Vientiane, is in the prefecture. The prefecture was created in 1989, when it was split off from Vientiane province.

On a curve of the Mekong River, and bordering Thailand, the prefecture covers an area of 3,920 km^{2} (1,510 sq mi). Vientiane city was built in the 16th century in the reign of King Saysethathirath. The older part of the city has temples, museums, monuments and parks.

Protected areas in the prefecture include Phou Khao Khouay National Protected Area, Phou Phanang National Protected Area, and Houay Ngang Forest Reserve.

== Geography ==
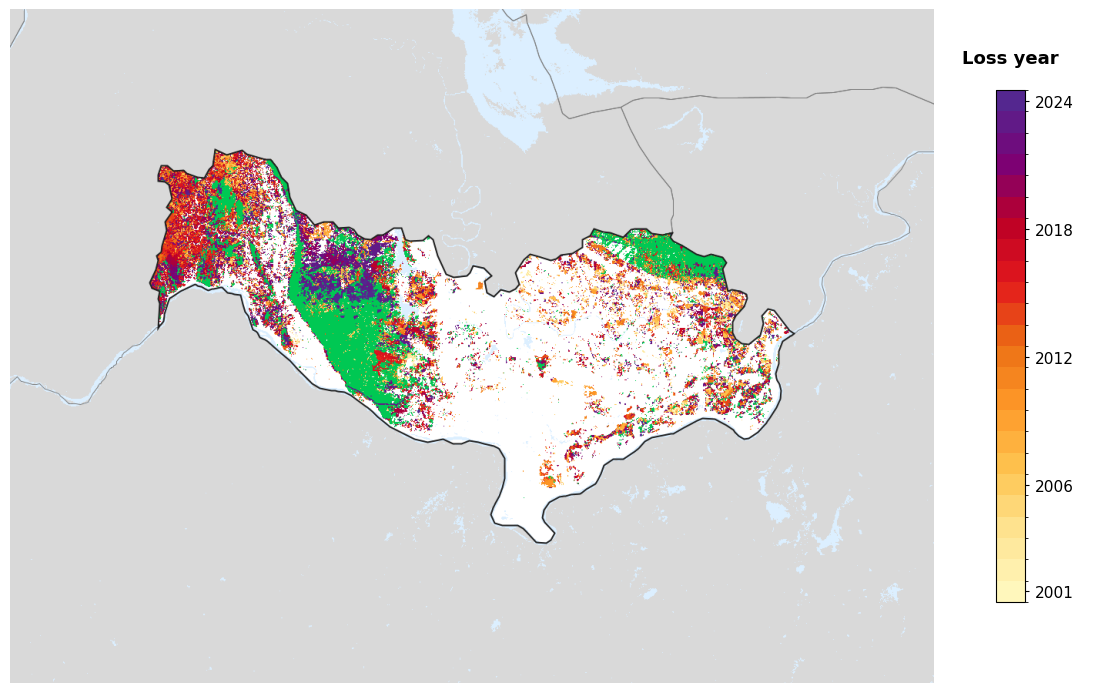
Tree-cover loss year in Vientiane Prefecture, 2001-2024, from the Global Forest Change dataset.

The province and the capital city are on a bend of the Mekong bordering Thailand. Settlements include Vientiane, Ban Ang, Ban Simano, Ban Hat Kai, Ban Pako, Ban Donnoun, Ban Na, Ban Don, Ban Tha Bok, Ban Non and Tha Ngon. Nam Houm Reservoir and Nam Souang Reservoir lie off Route 13, north of Vientiane. Nongtha Lake lies in the northern part of the city, and Nong Seuam Lake is to the northeast off Route 10. About 5 km (3 miles) north of Ban Hat Kai is the Tat Xai Waterfall, and about 5 km (3 miles) to the west, the smaller Tat Leuk Waterfall. Ban Na, along Route 13 to the northeast of Vientiane, is surrounded by paddy fields. About 6 km (4 miles) from here is Pung Xai, an elephant observation point.

=== Districts ===
No.	District	Name in Lao
1-01	Chanthabuly District (Urban Vientiane)	ເມືອງຈັນທະບູລີ
1-02	Sikhottabong District (Urban Vientiane)	ເມືອງສີໂຄດຕະບອງ
1-03	Xaysetha District (Urban Vientiane)	ເມືອງໄຊເສດຖາ
1-04	Sisattanak District (Urban Vientiane)	ເມືອງສີສັດຕະນາກ
1-05	Naxaithong District	ເມືອງນາຊາຍທອງ
1-06	Xaythany District	ເມືອງໄຊທານີ
1-07	Hadxayfong District (Urban Vientiane)	ເມືອງຫາດຊາຍຟອງ
1-08	Sangthong district	ເມືອງສັງທອງ
1-09	Mayparkngum district	ເມືອງປາກງື່ມ

=== Protected areas ===
Most of the land to the west and northwest of the main urban centre is forested and hilly in parts with the peaks of Phu Sang (1,666 metres (5,466 ft)) and Phu Khao Khuay (1,039 metres (3,409 ft)), and an area in the northeastern part at the rim of the forest protected by the Phou Khao Khuay National Biodiversity Conservation Area. The protected reserves in the prefecture are the Houay Ngang Forest Reserve and the Phou Phanang National Biodiversity Conservation Area (which covers most of the forest in the west), while Phou Khao Khuay NBCA borders the northeast. The Houay Ngang Forest Reserve, within Vientiane, has species of birds and butterflies. A nature trail in the reserve is used for a day tour where the Ban Pako ecolodge is available overlooking the Nam Ngum River. Its approach is from Ban Pako by boat across the river. Dong Dok University in association with GTZ has developed the forest walk. The Nam Leuk and Nam Gnong Rivers flow through the prefecture.

== History ==
The Lao epic, the Phra Lak Phra Lam, claims that Prince Thattaradtha founded the city when he left the legendary Lao kingdom of Muong Inthapatha Maha Nakhone because he was denied the throne in favor of his younger brother. Thattaradtha founded a city called Maha Thani Si Phan Phao on the west bank of the Mekong; this city was said to have later become Udon Thani, Thailand. 1 day, a 7-headed Naga told Thattaradtha to start a new city on the east bank of the river opposite Maha Thani Si Phan Phao. The prince called this city Chanthabuly Si Sattanakhanahud, which was said to be the predecessor of Vientiane.

Contrary to the Phra Lak Phra Ram, historians believe that the city of Vientiane was an early Khmer settlement centered around a Hindu temple, which the Pha That Luang would later replace. Khmer princes ruling Say Fong were known to have made pilgrimages to the shrine near Vientiane. In the 11th and 12th centuries, the time when the Lao and Thai people are believed to have entered Southeast Asia from southern China, the remaining Khmer in the area were either killed, removed, or assimilated into the Lao civilization, which would overtake the area.

In 1354, when Fa Ngum founded the kingdom of Lan Xang, Vientiane became an administrative city, even though it was not made the capital. King Setthathirath established it as the capital of Lan Xang in 1563, to avoid a Burmese invasion. In the following centuries Vientiane sometimes came under the control of Vietnam, Burma, or Siam.

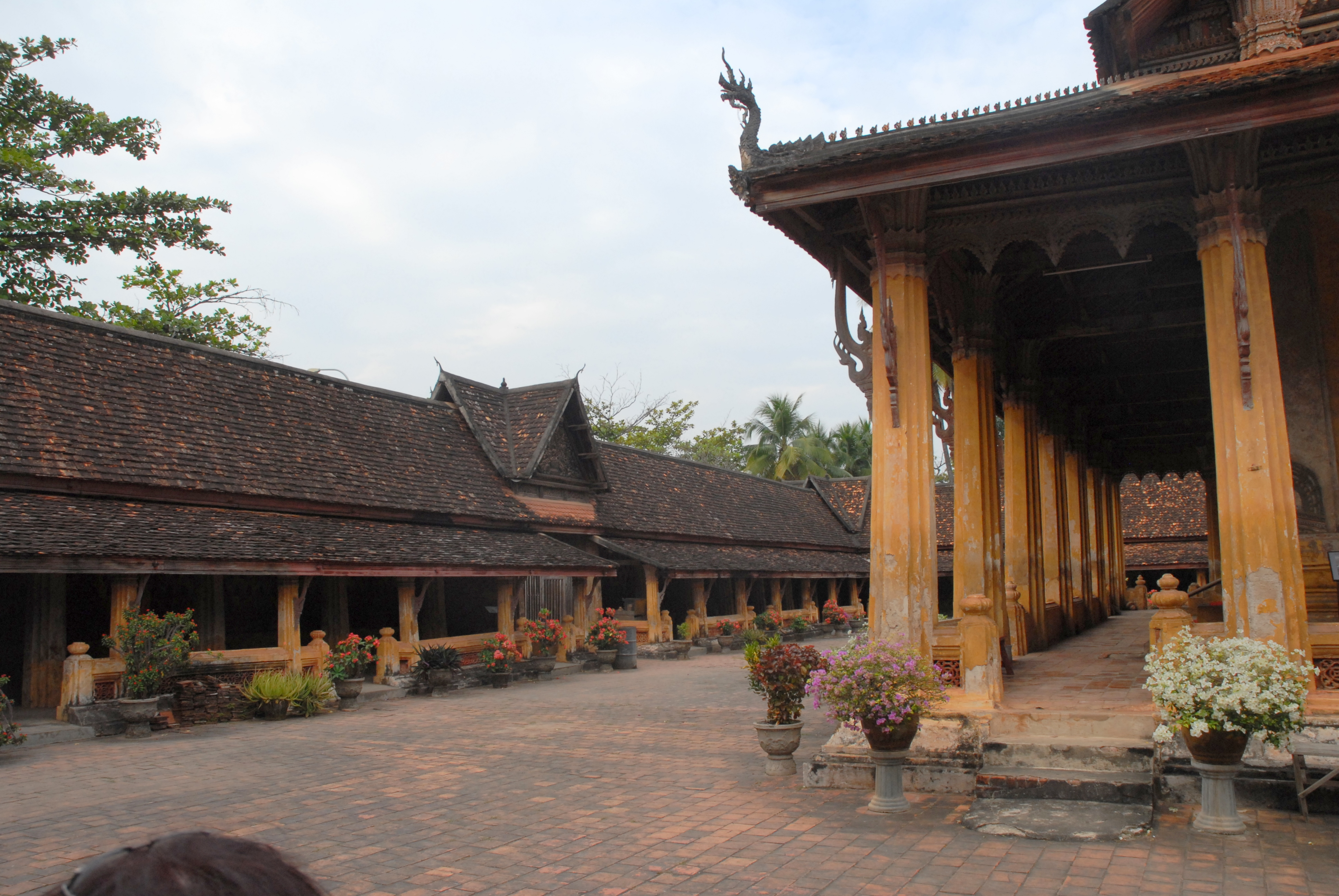
Wat Si Saket

When Lan Xang fell apart in 1707, it became an independent Kingdom of Vientiane. In 1779, it was conquered by the Siamese general Phraya Chakri and made a vassal of Siam. When King Anouvong tried to assert himself as an independent kingdom, and raised an unsuccessful rebellion, it was obliterated by Siamese armies in 1827. The city was burned to the ground and was looted of nearly all Laotian artifacts, including Buddha statues. The Siamese routed Anouvong and razed the city leaving only Wat Si Saket in “good shape”. Vientiane was in ruins, depopulated, and disappearing into the forest when the French arrived in 1867. It eventually passed to French rule in 1893. It became the capital of the French protectorate of Laos in 1899. The French rebuilt the city and repaired Buddhist temples such as Pha That Luang, Haw Phra Kaew, and built colonial buildings. By a decree signed in 1900 by Governor-General Paul Doumer, the province was divided into 4 muang: Borikan, Patchoum, Tourakom, and Vientiane. 2 years earlier, men from these 4 muang were responsible for building a house for the first administrator of Vientiane, Pierre Morin.

During World War II, Vientiane fell to Japanese forces, under the command of Sako Masanori. On 9 March 1945 French paratroopers arrived, and liberated Vientiane on 24 April 1945.

In August 1960, Kong Le seized the capital and insisted that Souvanna Phouma, become prime minister. In December, General Phoumi then seized the capital, overthrew the Phouma government, and installed Boun Oum as prime minister. In 1975, Pathet Lao troops moved towards the city and US personnel began evacuating the capital. On 23 August 1975, a contingent of 50 Pathet Lao women liberated the city.

In the 1980s, there was growing concern regarding unplanned and uncontrolled urban growth, leading to the founding of the Urban Development Program of Vientiane Prefecture (UCP). Prior to the mid-1990s, the prefecture was led by a government which included 14 departments. These were branches of national ministry offices. The prefecture was unable to collect taxes. Whatever revenues were collected were subsequently transferred to the national government. In 1993, the Vientiane Urban Planning Committee (VUPC) became the highest decision-making organization in the prefecture; it was governed by a chairman, deputy chair, and 8 members. In 1999, the Vientiane Urban Development and Administration Authority (VUDAA) was established at the prefecture level to manage the city's development. The St. Paul Foundation built in 2001 and a Vocational School for the Disabled in Ban Sikeud in Vientiane Prefecture.

== Demographics ==
The prefecture had a population of 820,942 as at the 2015 census, and was projected to have 1,009,300 inhabitants as at mid 2023. The prefecture's average annual population growth during the period of 1995–2005 was 2.79%. The main ethnic group in the province is Lao.

== Landmarks ==
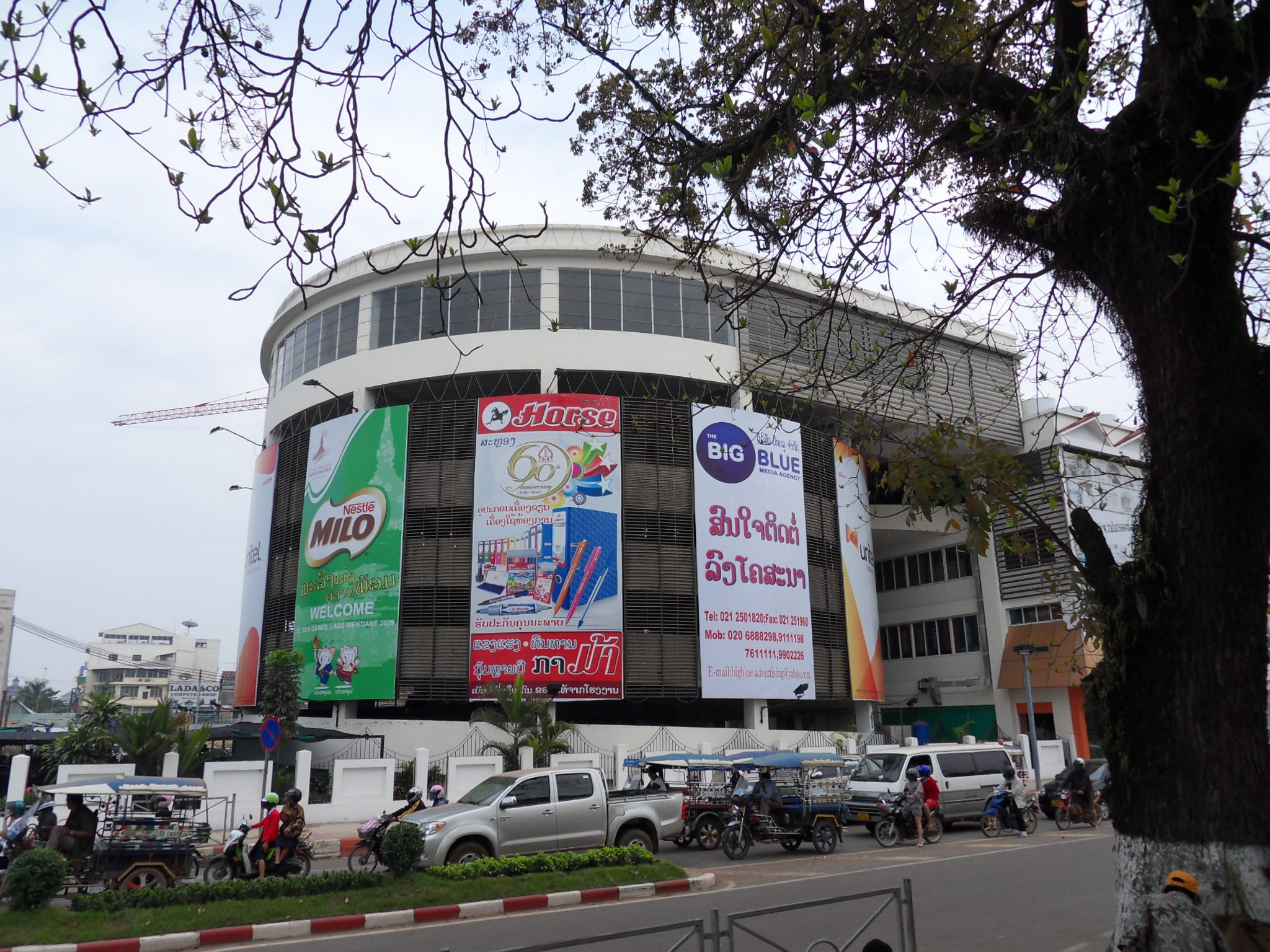
Ta Lat Sao

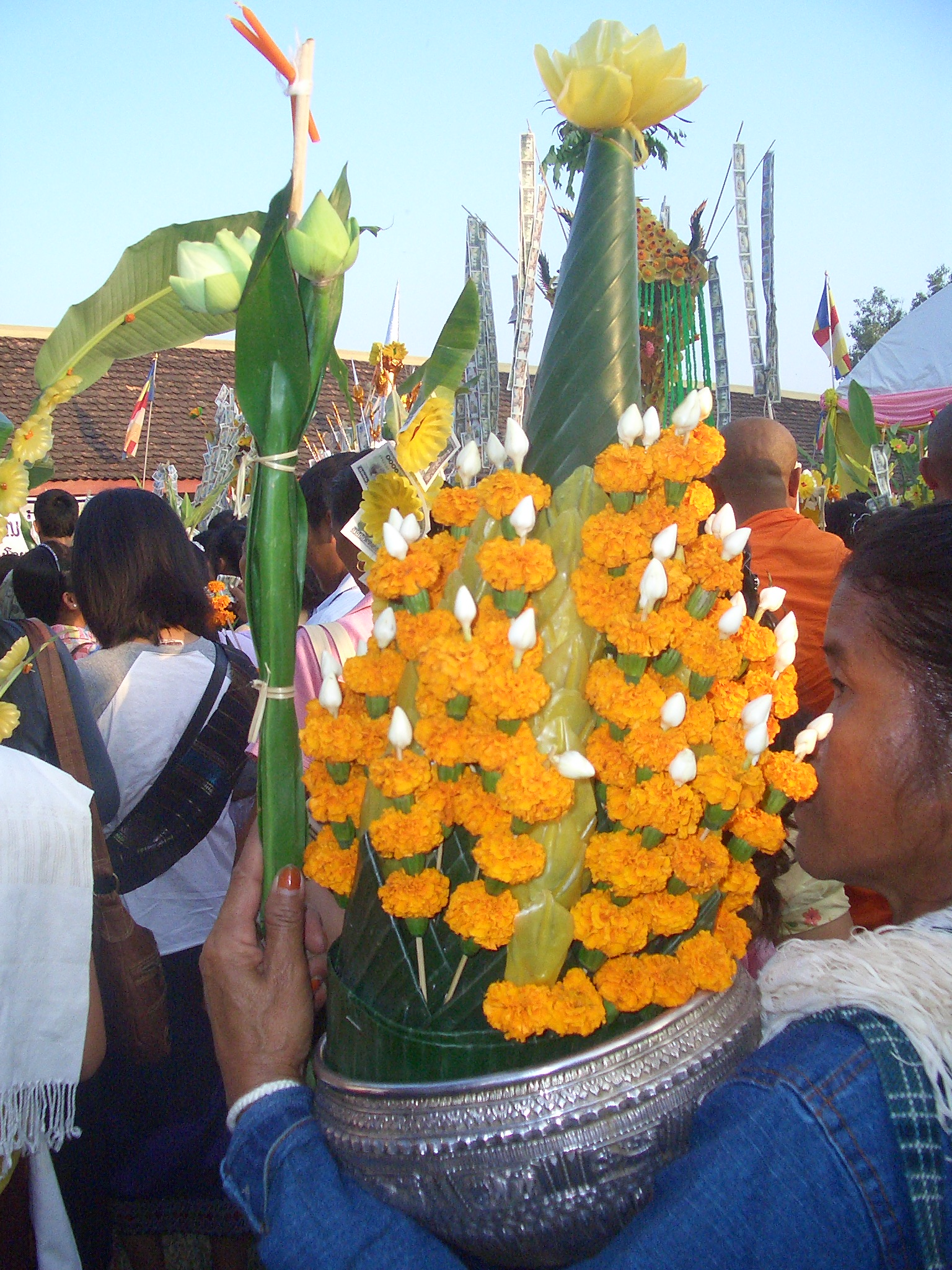
Left: Patuxay. Right: That Luang Festival at the That Luang Stupa.

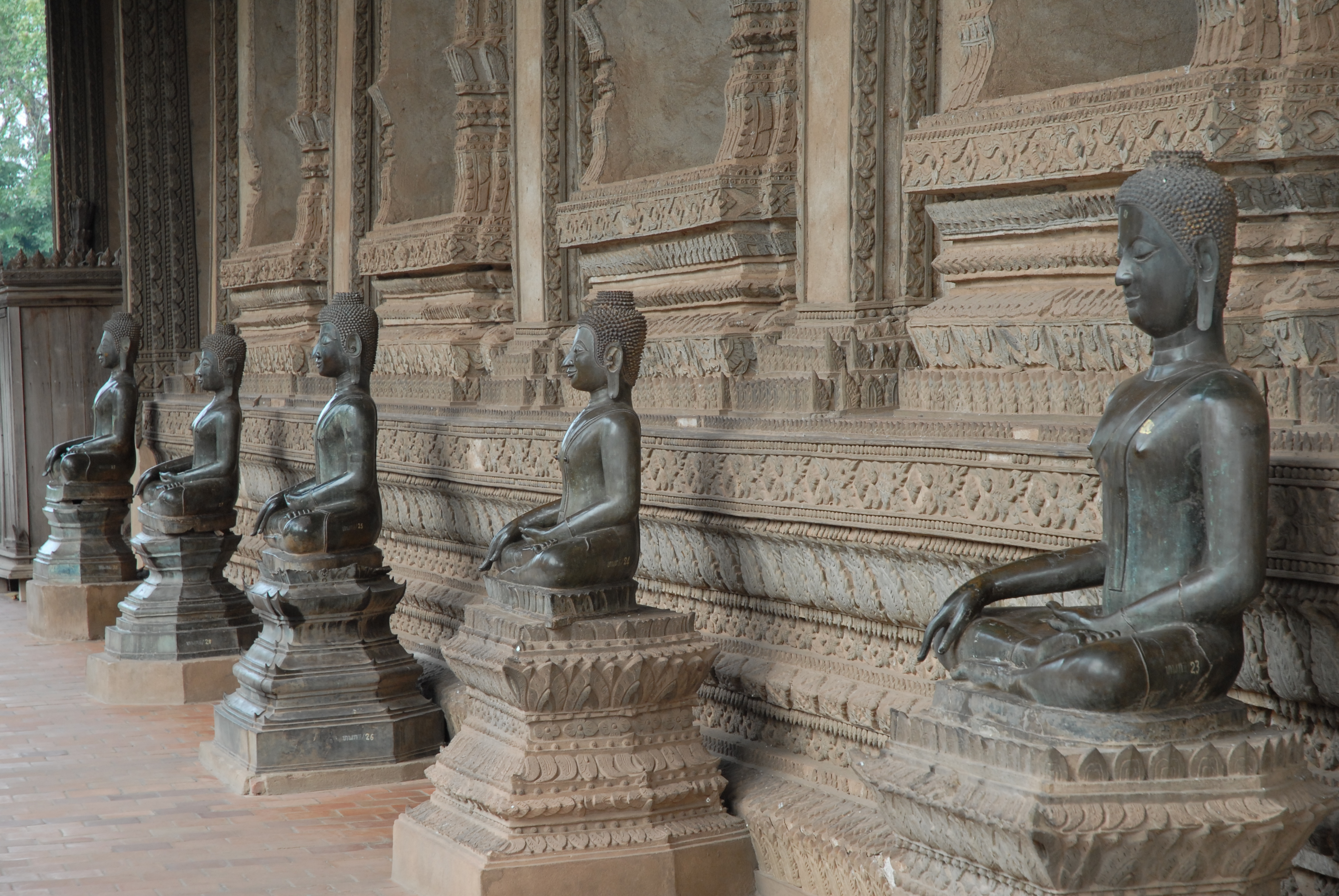
Bronze Buddha statues, Ho Pra Keo Museum

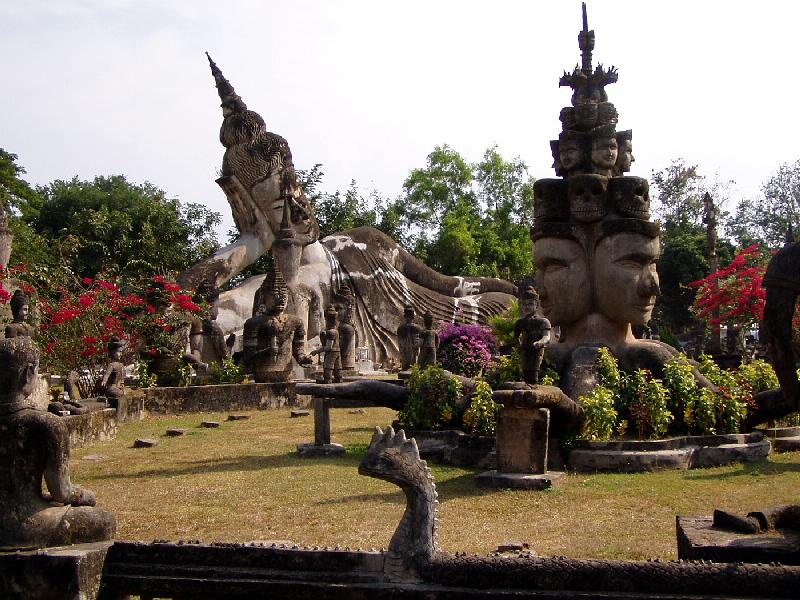
Xieng Khouan Buddha Park

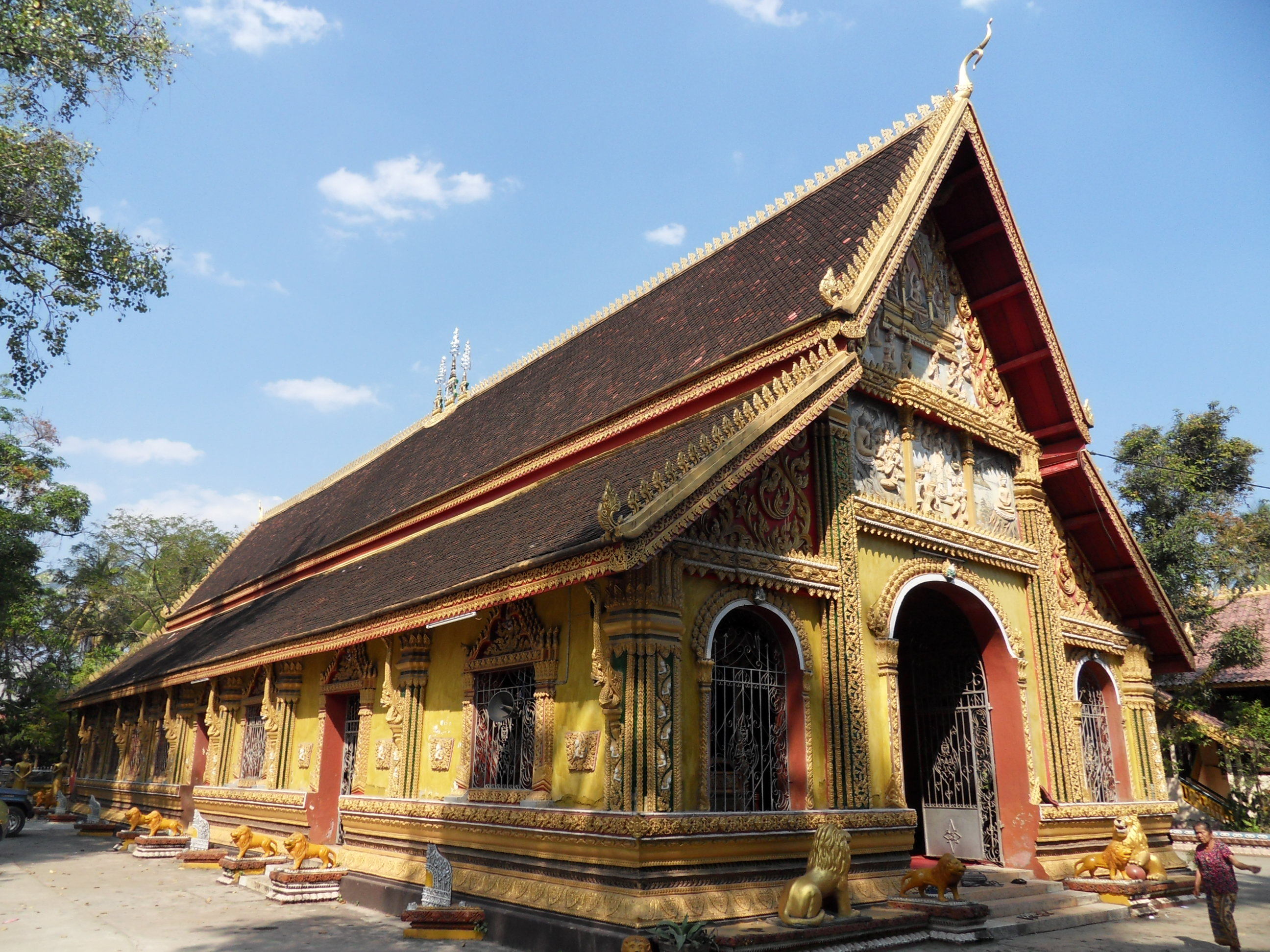
Wat Si Muang

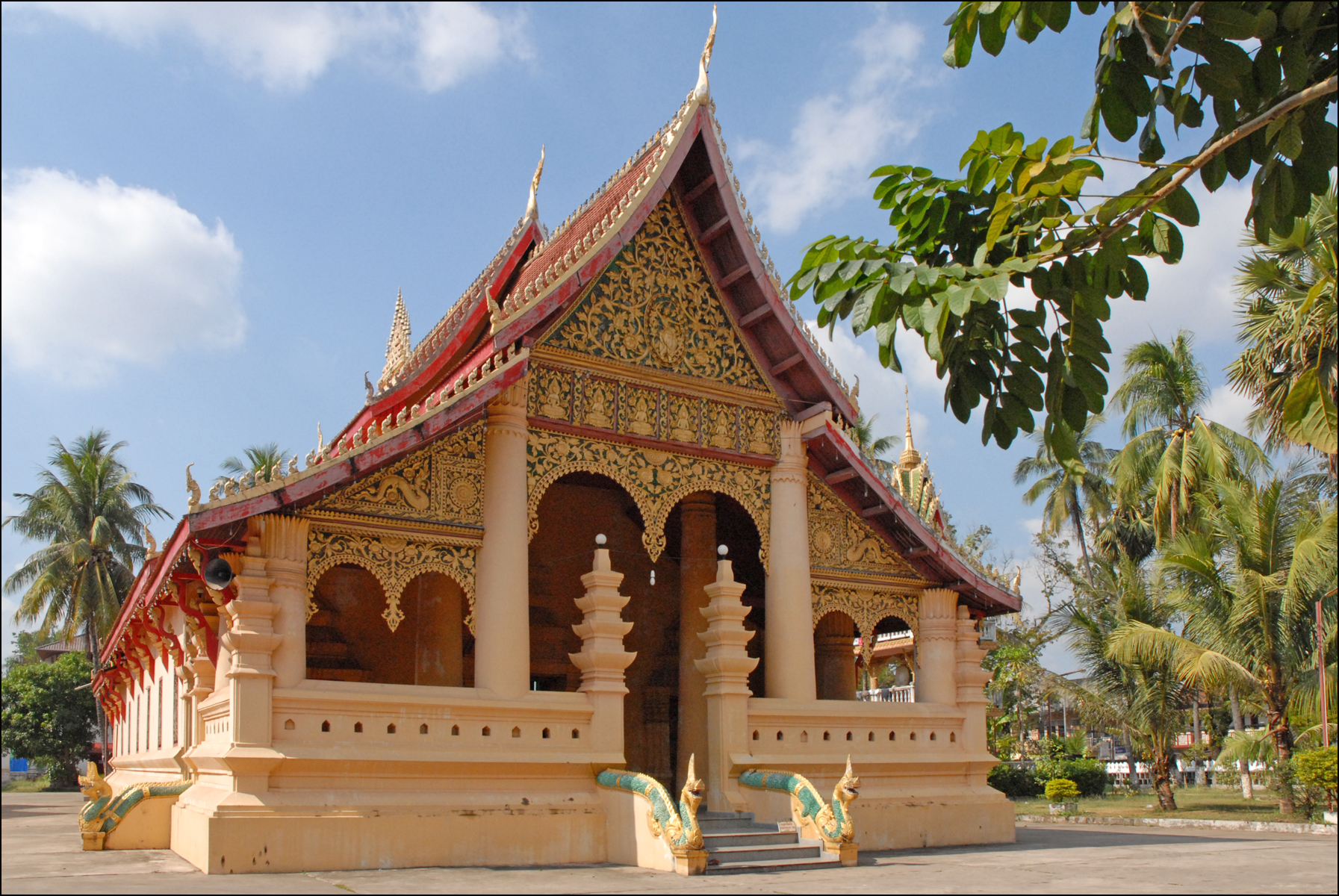
Wat Ongtue

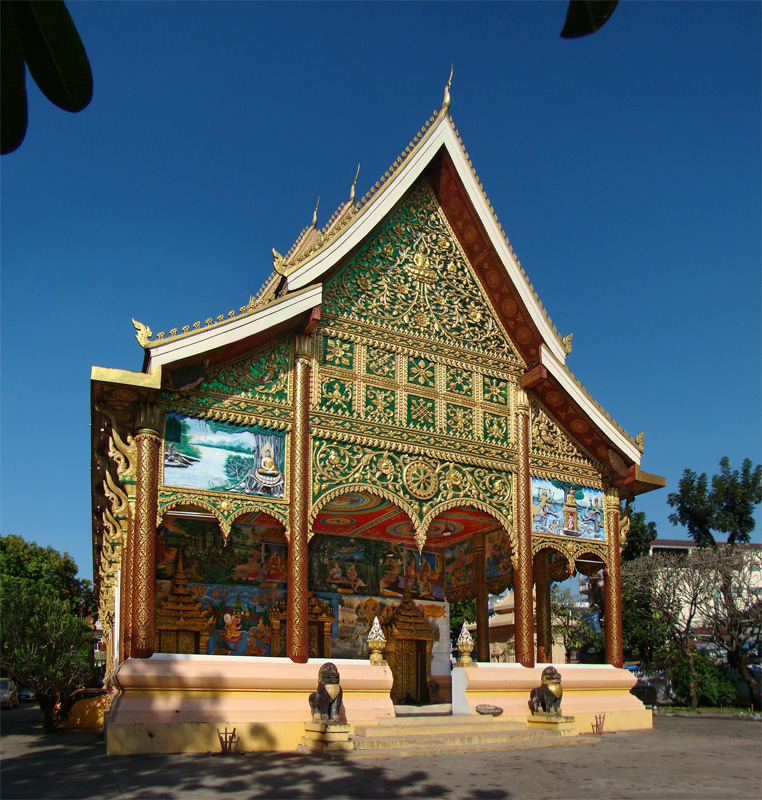
Wat Inpeng

Some of the landmarks in the Vientiane city are That Luang Stupa (Great Sacred Stupa), Lao National Museum, Haw Phra Kaew Museum, Wat Sisaket, Patuxay Monument, Revolutionary Monument, Wat Simuang, Wat Ongtue, Wat Inpeng, Ta Lat Sao (Morning Market), Suan Wattanatham Bandapao (National Ethnic Cultural Park), Khau Midthaphab (Friendship Bridge), Xieng Khouan Buddha Park and the Hinkhanna Waterfall.

Ta Lat Sao, the morning market is on Lanexang Avenue. It has 3 main buildings, each with 2 floors. It is the commercial center of Vientiane. The market has shops where Lao antiques, textiles, souvenirs, handicrafts, jewelry, and other imported goods are available.

=== Monuments ===
Patuxay

Patuxay is a memorial monument, which is a landmark in Vientiane built in 1958 on Lanexang Avenue. Its architecture inspired by the Arc de Triomphe. The monument's 5 towers represent the Five Principles of Peaceful Coexistence among nations of the world. They are representative of the 5 Buddhist principles of "thoughtful amiability, flexibility, honesty, honour, and prosperity". It has gateways on 4 sides oriented to the 4 cardinal directions. The East-West gateway open to the Long Xang Avenue, which is used during ceremonial national parades. It is a popular location for visitors and local people who visit the monuments in the afternoons.

That Luang Stupa

That Luang Stupa ('Great Sacred Stupa'), with official name of Pha Chedi Lokojumani (meaning: 'World Precious Sacred Stupa'), was initially built in 1566 during the reign of King Saysethathirath. It was rebuilt as Luang Stupa in 1953 and later a national monument. Its golden stupa is 45 metres (148 ft) high and the edifice is described as a "gilded missile cluster". The gold colored central image inside the stupa is in the shape of a curve of an extended Lotus bud. The annual That Luang Festival is held here in the twelfth waxing Lunar month in accordance with the Buddhist Lunar Calendar, lasting for 7 days. Near this stupa, there is the Revolutionary Monument, a monument with starred pinnacles was built in memory of those killed in the conflicts between 1945 and 1975.

=== Museums ===
Lao National Museum

The Lao National Museum, on Samsenthai Road opposite the Cultural Hall. was founded as the national museum highlighting the revolution of the 1970s. It is in a French colonial building. This museum, which was originally built in 1925 as the French governor's residence, presents the history of Laos, highlighting the Lao peoples' struggle to free the country from foreign occupiers and imperialist forces. The museum has a range of artifacts, including items unearthed at Lao Pako, Plain of Jars, including Hindu statues from the Khmer period.

Ho Pra Keo Museum

The Ho Pra Keo Museum was originally a temple, built in 1565 by King Saysethathirath. It had an Emerald Buddha which was taken away to Siam in 1828, The building was converted into a museum during the 1970s. It houses Buddhist sculptures. The President's Palace (former Royal Palace) and gardens can be seen from the terrace of the museum.

=== Parks ===
Xieng Khouan Buddha Park

The Xieng Khouan Buddha Park, built in 1958, has Buddhist and Hindu sculptures placed in the gardens and trees. It is about 28 km (17 mi) south of Vientiane and overlooks the Mekong to Nong Khai in Thailand. The creator of this religious park, Bunleua Sulilat (1932–1996), a spiritual leader in the 1950s, created 2 theme parks including this park and another at Nang Khoi. In 1958, he started building concrete religious sculptures in the park on the outskirts of Vientiane.

Suan Wattanatham Bandapao

Suan Wattanatham Bandapao (National Ethnic Cultural Park) is 20 km (12 mi) south of Vientiane city close to the Khau Midthaphab (First Thai-Lao Friendship Bridge across the Mekong). Along tree-shaded avenues are traditional Lao homes, sculptures of literary icons of Laos, and there is a zoo.

=== Temples ===
Wat Si Saket

Wat Si Saket Temple built in Siamese style between 1818 and 1824, by King Anou Vong (who was educated in Siam's court and was their chieftain in Laos) is in the old city and survived during the war with Siam. There are 6,840 Buddha images in niches in the main hall and the walls of the courtyard. Features of this temple are the silver and ceramics images of Buddha, 300 seated and standing Buddhas made in wood, stone, silver, and bronze. In the hall known as Ho Trai, there are Buddhist manuscripts of the 18th century. During the French colonial regime, it was restored twice, once in 1924 and again in 1930. Buddha statues damaged during the Siamese-Lao War of 1828 are housed on the west side of the temple. A Khymer Naga Buddha sculpture seated on a coiled hooded cobra (naga) is in front of the main seated Buddha image dating to the 13th century Khmer period. In the 1970 Expo Osaka held in Japan, the temple was depicted as the Lao national emblem.

Wat Si Muang

Wat Si Muang Temple in the Ban Simuang village on the Sethathirath Road has the foundation pillar of Vientiane. Built in 1956, said to be protected by the spirit of a local girl "Si", who according to local myth, while pregnant jumped to death as a sacrificial offering when the pillar was in the process of being lowered into its foundation. In November, Phasat Pheung annual festival (wax tableaux parade) precedes, by 2 days, the That Luang Festival held at the temple. The city pillar is a phallic symbol, considered as guardian of the city. It was destroyed in 1818 and rebuilt in 1915. A Buddha image in relief and carved wooden stele are seen opposite to this pillar. Behind the city pillar there is place where devotees place broken images and pots to get rid of bad luck. In the public park opposite to the pillar, there is statue of King Sisavang Vong.

Wat Ongtue

Wat Ongtue, also called "the temple of the heavy Buddha", has a 16th century Buddha image, which weighs 10 tons (10,160 kg). It was built by King Saysethathirath and is on the Wat Ongtue-Sethathirath Road. It is a said that the temple site was used in the 3rd century for religious purposes. The temple was destroyed in the Siamese–Laos war and rebuilt in the 20th century. The deputy patriarch of the monastic order resides there and heads the Buddhist institute for monks who come from all over the country for training in the Buddhist Dhamma. The Buddha statue is 5.8 metres (19 ft 0 in) in height and is on the back side of the sim and is flanked by 2 more standing Buddha statues.

Wat Inpeng

Wat Inpeng Temple ('to transform') at Inpeng Pagoda, belongs to the Mon and Khmer cultures. It is known as the "historical landmark of arts and culture" of Laos. According to legends, God assisted in the construction of this pagoda by assuming the forms of an old wise man and an old white monk. It is to the north of Wat Ongtue Temple and has artistic and cultural edifices of rock sculptures, Buddha images and rock columns.
