= Xaysetha district (Vientiane) =

Xaysetha District (Wiangchan)
- Town
- Coordinates: 17°57′54″N 102°38′54″E
- Country: Laos
- Province: Vientiane Prefecture
- District: Xaysetha Vientiane

Population (2020)
  - Total: 92,621
- Time zone: UTC+7 (ICT)

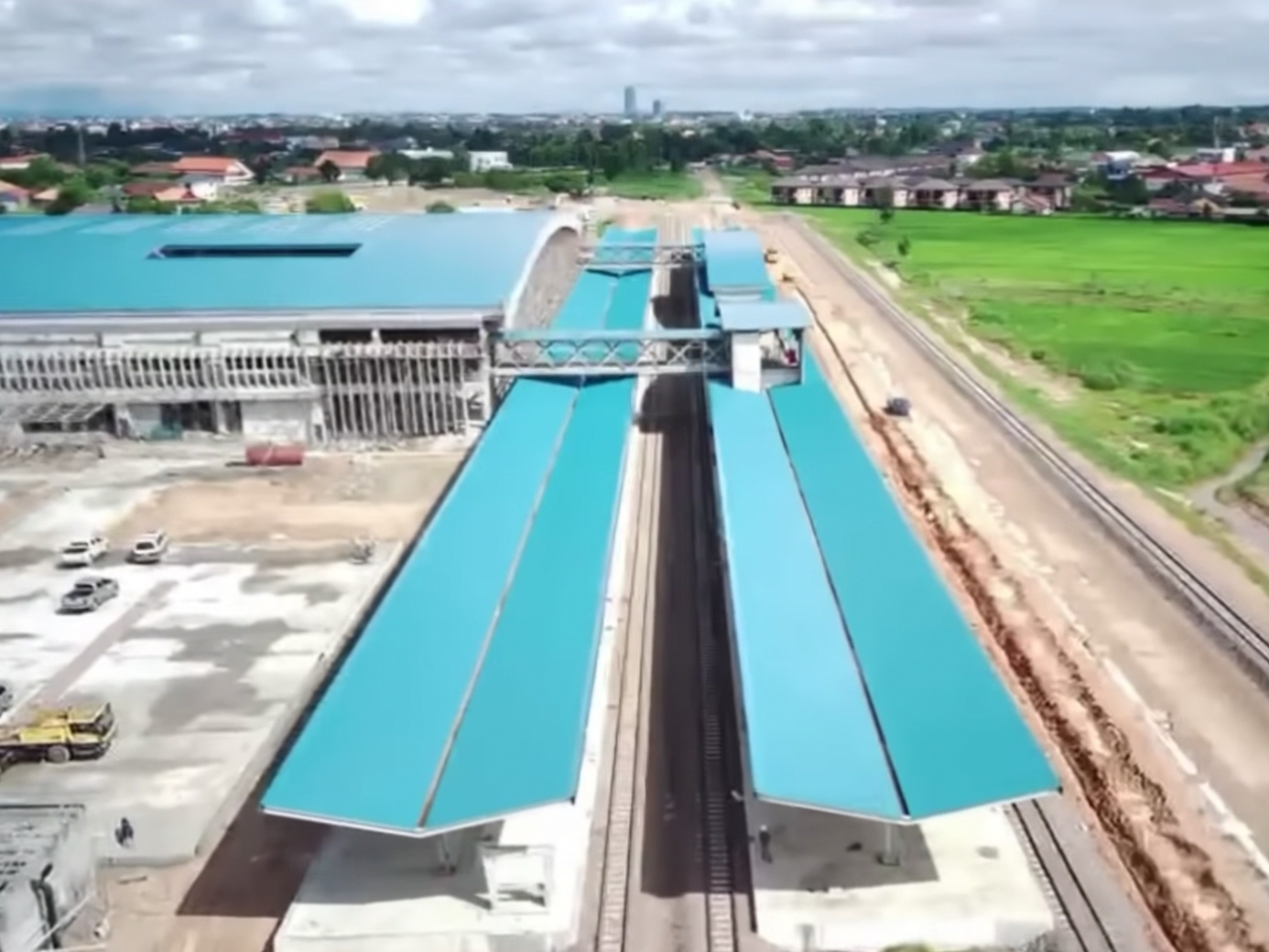
Khamsavath railway station

Xaysetha (Jayachesta) district is a district of Vientiane Prefecture. The population was 92,621 as of 2020

== Villages ==
Xaysetha consisted of 52 villages as follows:

- Ban Chommani Nuea
- Ban Chommani Tai
- Ban Chommani Klang
- Ban Phon Pha-nao
- Ban Phon Khang
- Ban Nong Sang
- Ban Phon Sa-at
- Ban That Nuea
- Ban Nong Bon
- Ban Phom Sai
- Ban Na Sai
- Ban Fai
- Ban Mong Jaroen
- Ban That Klang
- Ban That Tai
- Ban Thong Khae
- Ban Si Sang Om
- Ban Saphom
- Ban Phom Thap Nuea
- Ban Phom Thap Tai
- Ban Hong Suphap
- Ban Non Sawan
- Ban Hong Nuea
- Ban Non Sangda
- Ban A-mon
- Ban Saeng Sawang
- Ban Khot Kham
- Ban Vang Khai
- Ban Non Sawang
- Ban Hua Ki
- Ban Non Tham Nuea
- Ban Kham Sa-waht
- Ban Non Whai
- Ban Mueng Noi
- Ban Song Rada
- Ban Kham Ngoi
- Ban Ma Sang Phai
- Ban Som Sanga
- Ban Thai Dam
- Ban Mak Ai Klang
- Ban Mak Ai Tai
- Ban Sok Noi
- Ban Sok Yai
- Ban Sam Khae
- Ban Phon Thong
- Ban Map Rom
- Ban Dung Yai
- Ban Dung Klang
- Ban Ma Hai
- Ban Nano
- Ban Chom Si
- Ban Non Tham Tai
