= AH15 =

Road in Southeast Asia

Asian Highway 15
- Map of AH15 in red
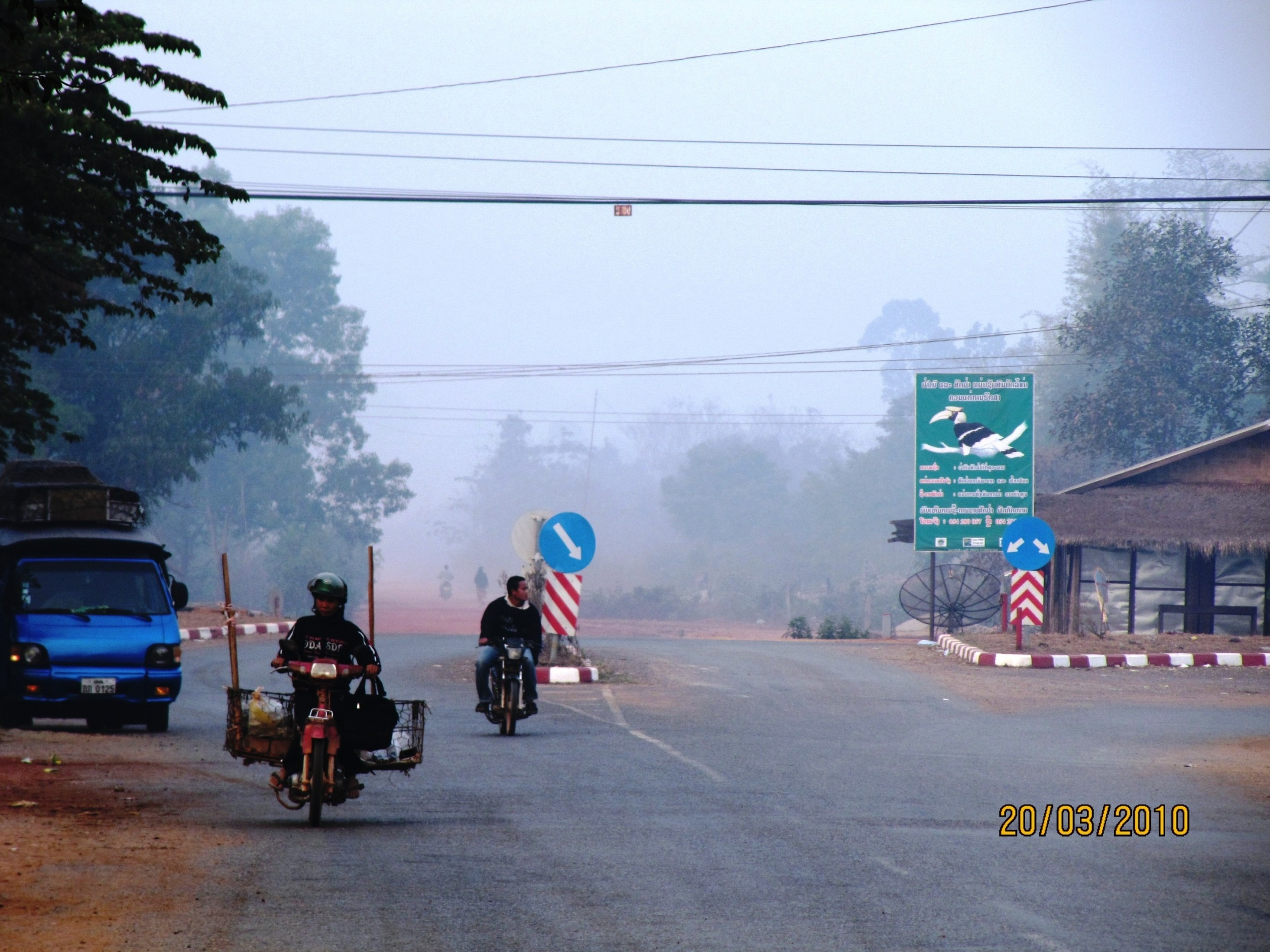
- AH15 at the Vieng Kham Junction

Route information
- Length: 566 km (352 mi)

Major junctions
- North end: Vinh, Vietnam
- South end: Udon Thani, Thailand

Location
- Countries: Vietnam; Laos; Thailand

Highway system
- Asian Highway Network
← AH14	→ AH16

Asian Highway 15 (AH15) is a road in the Asian Highway Network running 566 kilometres (352 mi) from Hồng Lĩnh, Vietnam to Udon Thani, Thailand connecting AH1 to AH12.

The route is as follows:

== Vietnam ==
- QL8: Vinh ( AH1) - Cau Treo

== Laos ==
- Route 8: Nam Phao - Vieng Kham
- Route 13 (Concurrent with AH11): Vieng Kham - Thakhek

== Thailand ==
- Route 295: Third Thai–Lao Friendship Bridge
- Route 212: At Samat - Nakhon Phanom
- Route 22: Nakhon Phanom - Udon Thani
