= AH13 =

Road in Asia

Asian Highway 13
- Map of AH13 in red
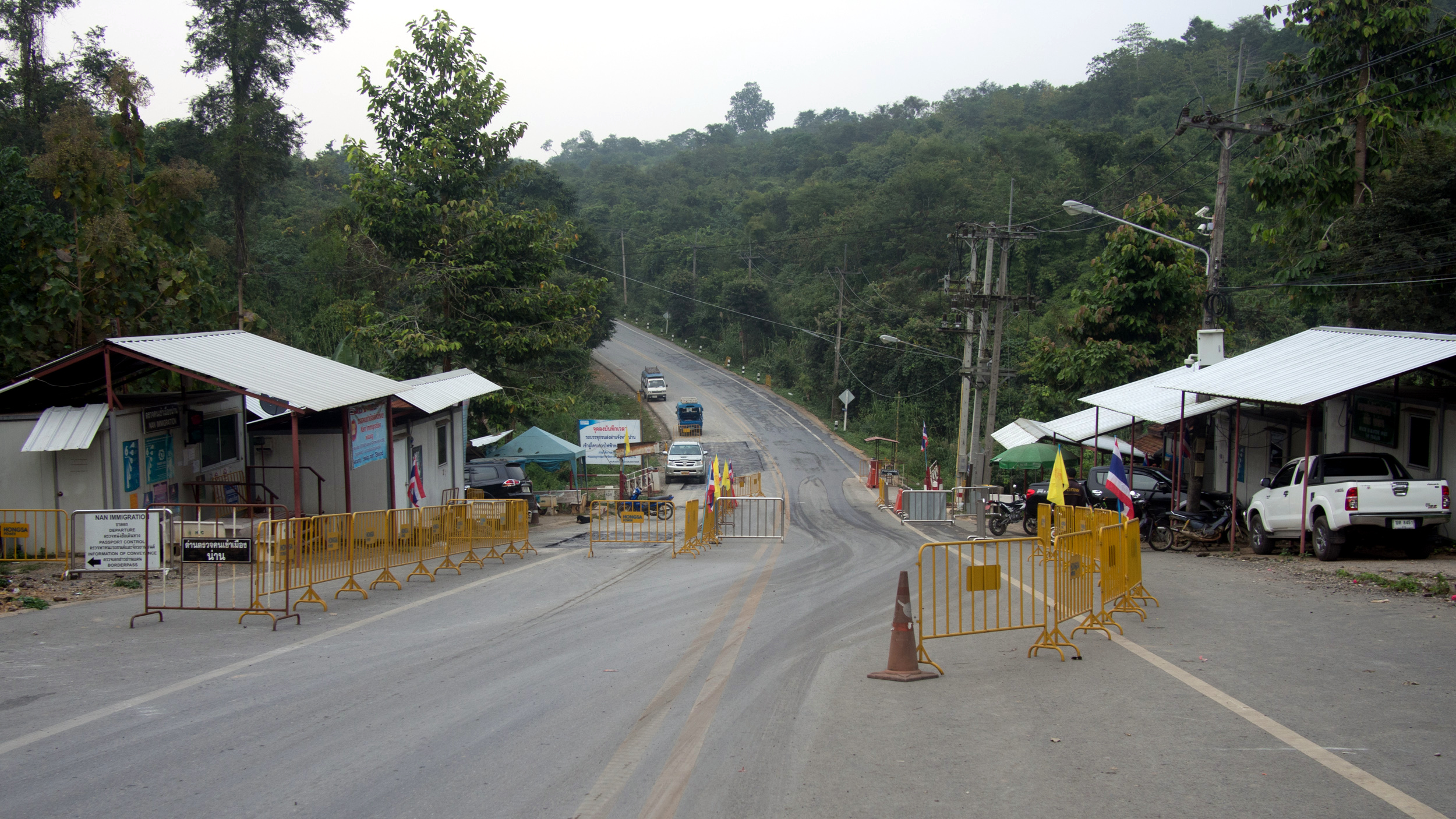
- The Thai border checkpoint at Huai Kon, in Chaloem Phra Kiat District, Nan

Route information
- Length: 1,409 km (876 mi)

Major junctions
- North end: Hanoi, Vietnam
- South end: Nakhon Sawan, Thailand

Location
- Countries: Vietnam; Laos; Thailand

Highway system
- Asian Highway Network
← AH12	→ AH14

Asian Highway 13 (AH13) is a road in the Asian Highway Network running 1,409 kilometres (876 mi) from Hanoi, Vietnam to Nakhon Sawan, Thailand. The route is as follows:

== Vietnam ==
- : Hanoi ( AH1 and AH14) - Dien Bien
- : Dien Bien - Thai Trang border crossing

In the future, will become AH13 instead of the current alignment on National Highways 6 and 279.

== Laos ==
- Route 2E: Thai Chang border crossing - Muang May - Muang Khoua - Oudomxay ( AH12)
- Route 2W: Oudomxay - Muang Ngeun - Ngeun border checkpoint

== Thailand ==
- Hwy 101: Huai Kon border checkpoint - Huai Kon - Den Chai
- Hwy 129: Phrae bypass
- Hwy 11: Den Chai - Uttaradit - Phitsanulok ( AH16)
- Hwy 117: Phitsanulok ( AH16) - Nakhon Sawan ( AH2)
