= National Route 8 (Vietnam) =

Road in Vietnam

National Route 8
- Quốc lộ 8

Route information
- Part of AH15
- Length: 110.3 km (68.5 mi)

Major junctions
- West end: Route 8 at Cau Treo Border Gate, Laotian border
- in Hồng Lĩnh Township
- East end: Xuân Hải Port

Location
- Country: Vietnam

Highway system
- Transport in Vietnam
← QL 7	→ QL 9

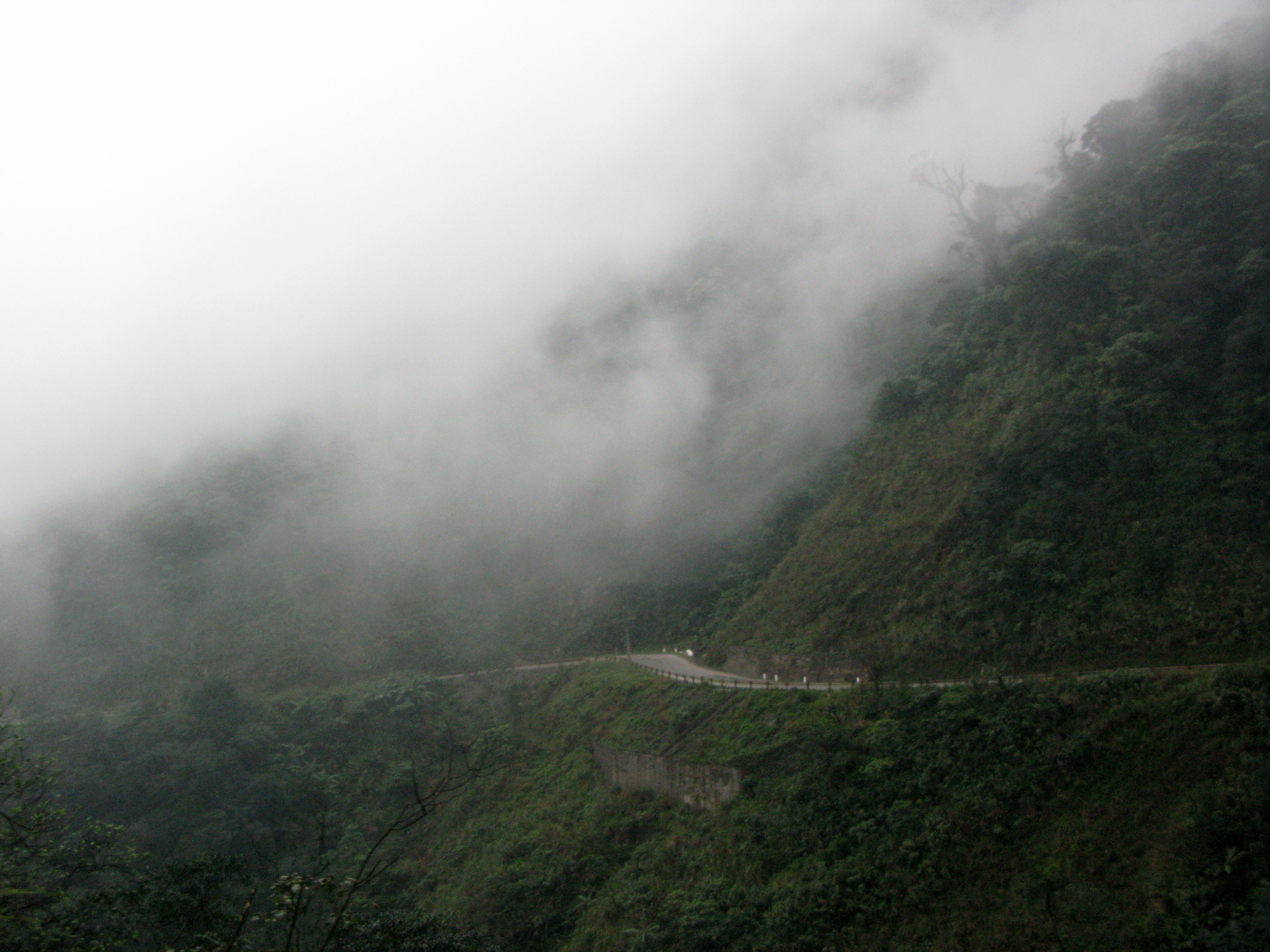
Route 8 in Annamite Range

National Route 8 is an east-west highway in Hà Tĩnh Province in North Central of Vietnam, which is managed and maintained by the central government. The route includes two segments. The 85.3 km-long segment from Hồng Lĩnh Township across Đức Thọ and Hương Sơn districts is called National Route 8A. There are 36 bridges in this route in which the two longest are Linh Cảm (crosses La River) and Hà Tân bridges. National Route 8A crosses Annamite Range and connects to National Route 1, Ho Chi Minh Highway and Lao National Route 8.

National Route 8A is a portion of AH15.

The 25 km-long segment from Hồng Lĩnh Town eastward and reach Xuân Hải Port is called National Route 8B.

In 2017, National Route 8C was designated from Thien Cam to Thanh Chuong along portions of provincial roads 551, 554, 550, and portions of National Routes 15, 8 and 8B.
