= AH16 =

Road in Vietnam

Asian Highway 16
- Map of AH16 in red
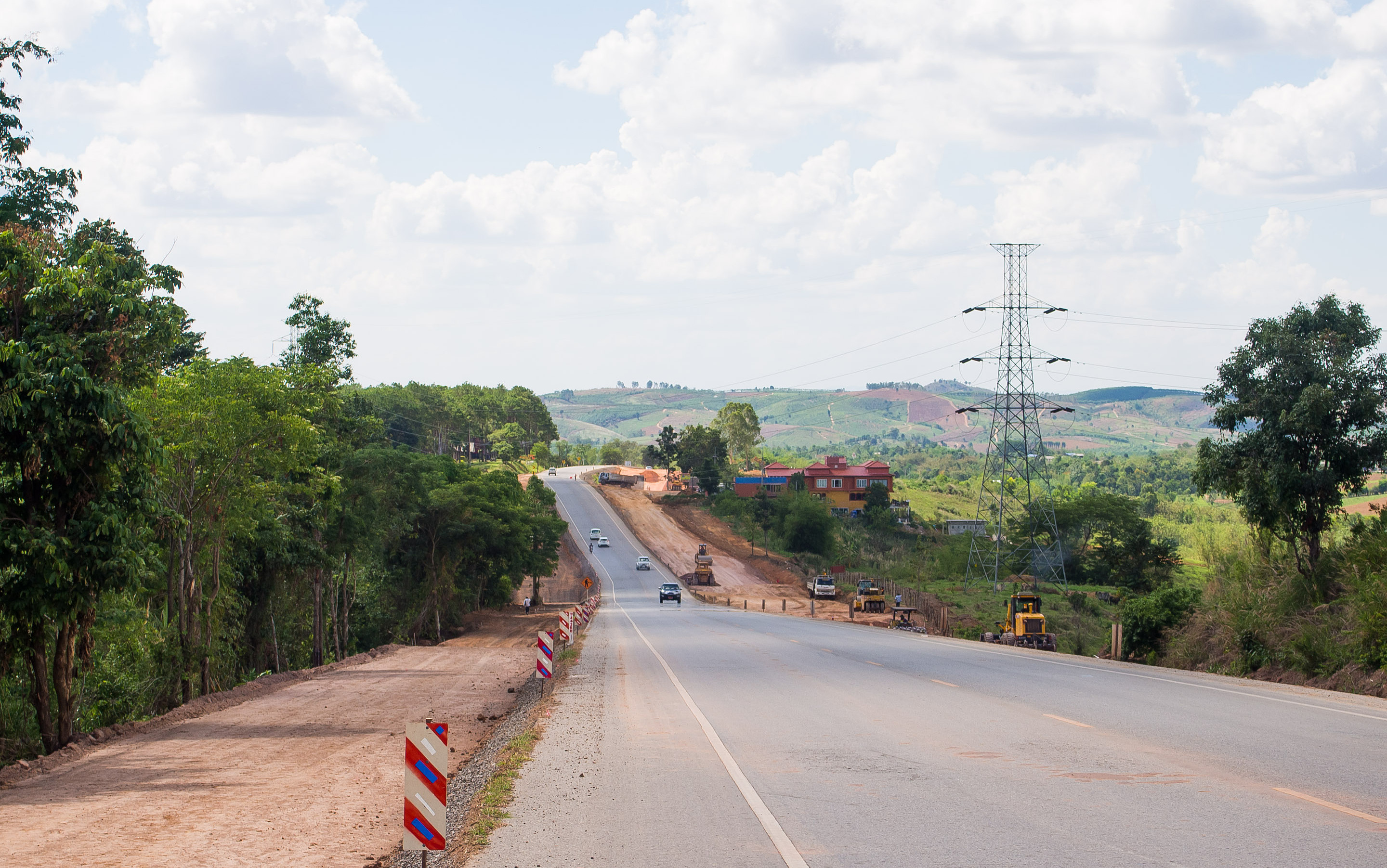
- AH16 in Thailand

Route information
- Length: 1,031 km (641 mi)

Major junctions
- West end: Tak, Thailand
- East end: Đông Hà, Vietnam

Location
- Countries: Thailand; Laos; Vietnam

Highway system
- Asian Highway Network
← AH15	→ AH17

Asian Highway 16 (AH16) is a road in the Asian Highway Network running 1,031 kilometres (641 mi) from Tak, Thailand to Đông Hà, Vietnam connecting AH1 and AH2 to AH1 after AH1 takes a turn from south to North after crossing Cambodia. The route is as follows:

== Thailand ==
- Route 12: Tak ( AH1 AH2) - Phitsanulok ( AH13)- Khon Kaen ( AH12) - Somdet - Mukdahan
- Route 212: Mukdahan - Bang Sai Yai
- Route 239: Second Thai–Lao Friendship Bridge

== Laos ==
- Route 9W: Savannakhet - Xeno
- Route 13: Xeno (concurrent with AH11 for 3 km)
- Route 9E: Xeno - Xépôn - Dansavan

== Vietnam ==
- QL9: Lao Bảo - Đông Hà ( AH1)
