= Route 450 (Laos) =

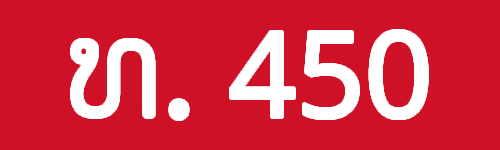
Route 450
- 450 Year Road
- Route 450, Dongphosy village

Route information
- Part of AH12
- Maintained by Government of Laos
- Length: 20.3 km (12.6 mi)

Major junctions
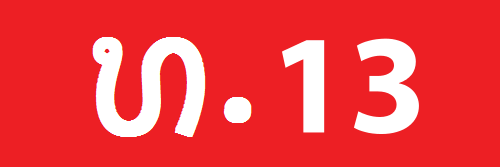
- North end: Dongdok village, Xaythany district Route 13
- South end: Hadxayfong district First Thai–Lao Friendship Bridge

Location
- Country: Laos
- Districts: Hadxayfong district, Xaysetha district, Xaythany district

Highway system
- Transport in Laos

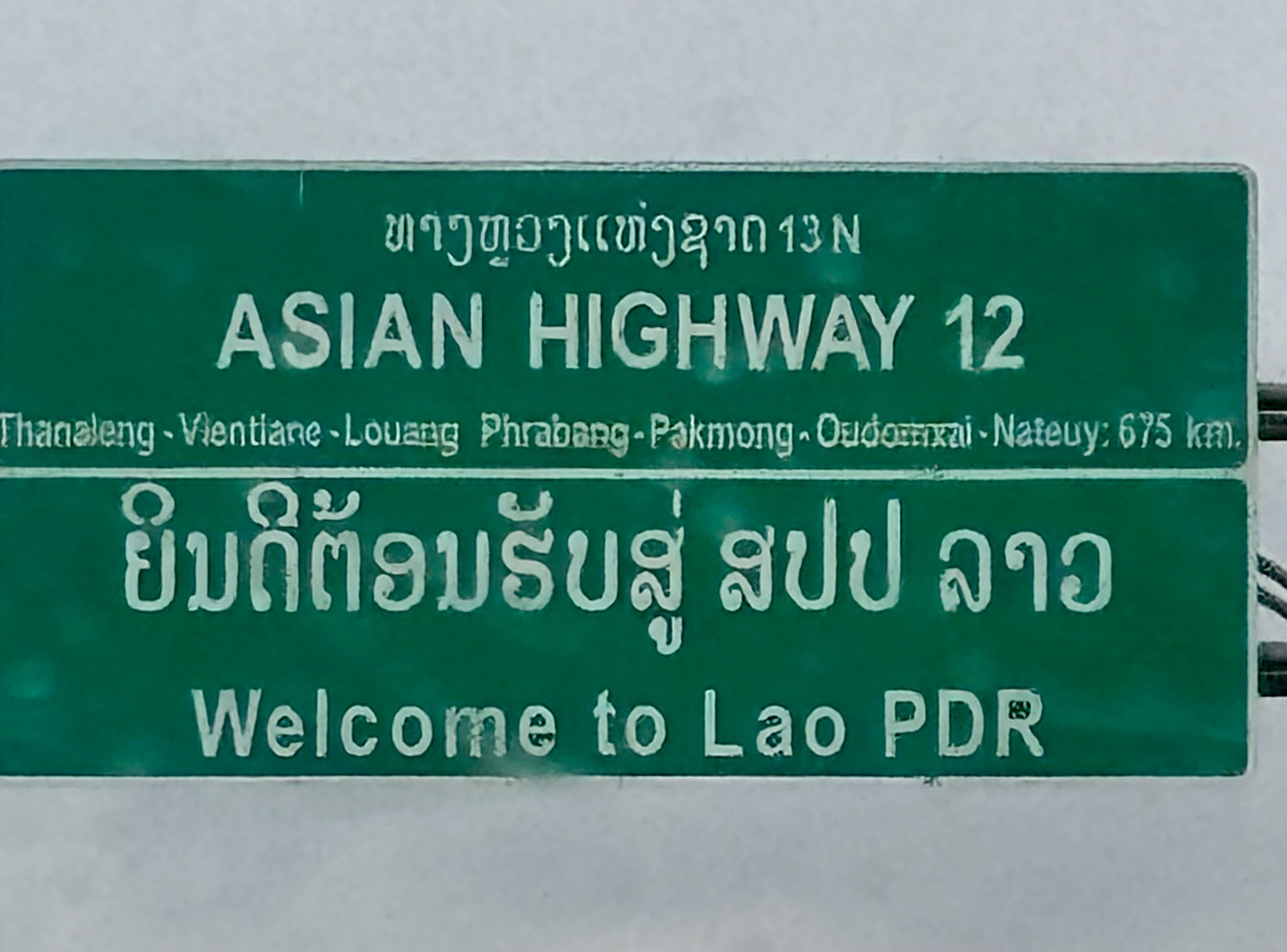
Welcoming sign

Route 450 (also known as 450 Year Road; Lao: ເສັ້ນທາງ 450 ປີ), is a highway in Vientiane Prefecture, Laos. It connects the Dongdok intersection in Xaythany district to Dongphosy in Hadxayfong district, near the First Thai–Lao Friendship Bridge, and forms part of the AH12 connecting Nateuy, Vientiane, and the Thai border at Thanaleng.

== History ==
The road was first proposed in 1991 by the Vientiane Prefecture government as part of a plan for the city's economic and urban development, intended to link the planned Thai-Lao Friendship Bridge with the national highway network on the eastern side of the capital city.
