= Mittraphap highway =

Mittraphap highway may refer to one of two highways in Thailand

- Thailand Route 2, commonly known as Mittraphap Road
- Thailand Route 12 between Phitsanulok and Lom Sak
