= Hồng Lĩnh (disambiguation) =

Hồng Lĩnh may refer to several places in Vietnam, including:

- Hồng Lĩnh, a district-level town of Hà Tĩnh Province
- Hồng Lĩnh, Thái Bình, a commune of Hưng Hà District
