= Lao Bảo =

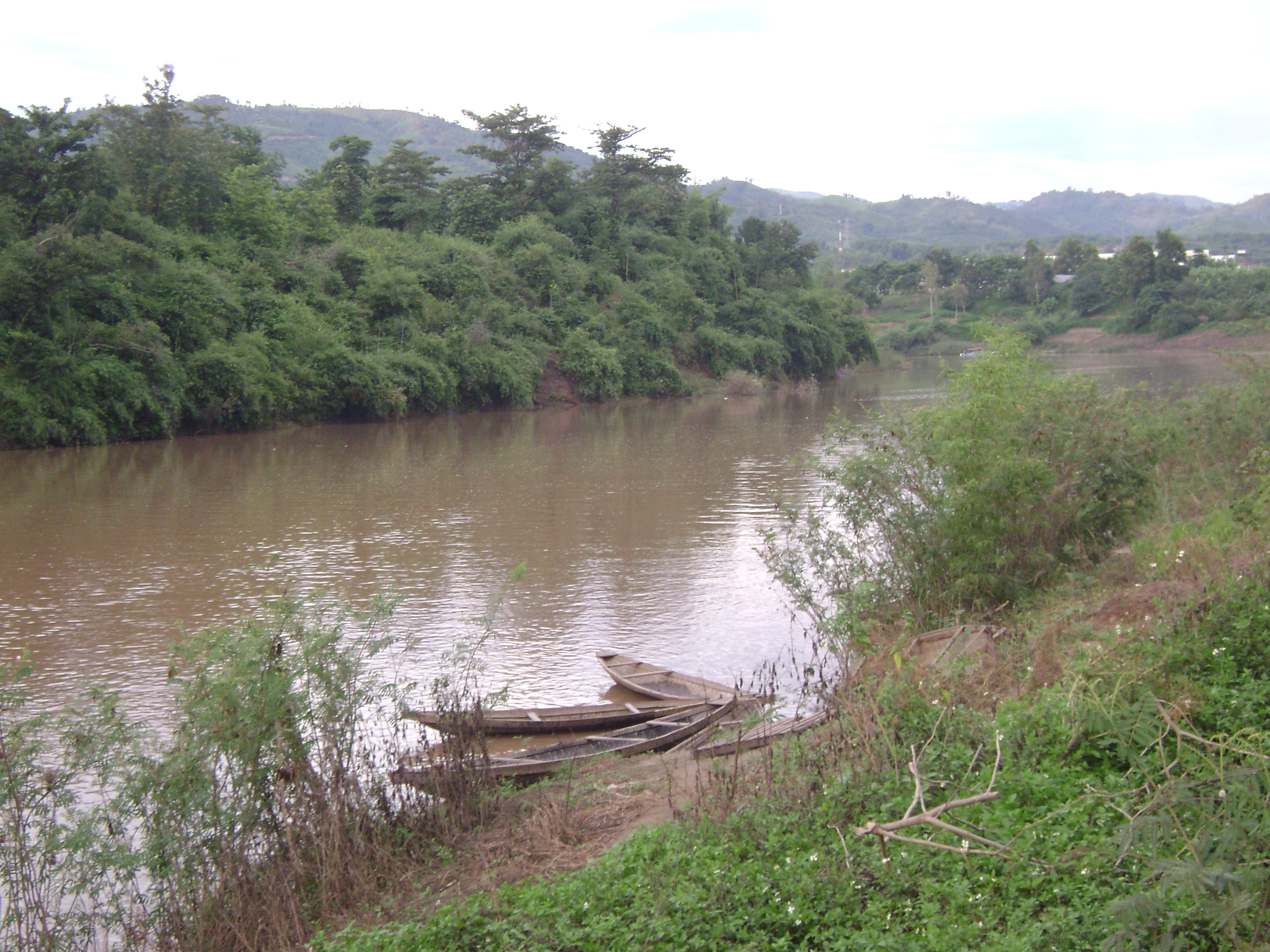
- The Sepon River at Lao Bao

- Location in Vietnam
- Coordinates: 16°37′0″N 106°36′0″E
- Country: Vietnam
- Province: Quảng Trị

Lao Bảo is a commune and small town in Quảng Trị Province, Vietnam, located in the North Central Coast region, near the border with Laos. Its population is approximately 30,000.

Lao Bảo is the last Vietnamese town on National Route 9, which runs westwards from Dong Ha near the Vietnamese coast over the Annamite Range into Laos. The road was constructed in 1930 by the French colonial administration to connect the towns along the Mekong River to the Vietnamese coast. As route AH16 in Asian Highway Network, the road continues further westwards through Laos and across the Mekong into Thailand. It is part of the East-West Economic Corridor that stretches 1,450 km, connecting four Mekong region countries: Vietnam, Laos, Thailand, and Myanmar.

As Lao Bảo is located in an advantaged area of commerce and border trade between Vietnam and Laos, this small town has opportunities to do business and exchange timber with Laos and Thailand for profit. Although it is a small town in the border area, it also provides several jobs for the people there. In comparison with the provincial capital of Đông Hà in standard of individual earnings, the earnings of inhabitants of Lao Bao are higher. In Lao Bảo the Sepon River (Vietnamese: Sông Xê-pôn) is the border line between Hướng Hóa and the Savan province of Laos. This river is only 1 meter in depth and its width is about 100 metres. Surrounding the river is a jungle with large, tall trees. Several commerce and trade initiatives with Laos and Thailand have been recently developed in Lao Bảo.

== Border crossing ==
An international border crossing between Vietnam and Laos is located in Lao Bảo and called the Lao Bao International Border Gate. The checkpoint on the Lao side is called the Dansavan International Border Gate, located in Dansavan village, Savannakhet Province, Laos. Besides conventional Vietnamese visas, the Lao Bao International Border Gate is also an entry point for Vietnamese Evisas.

== Gallery ==
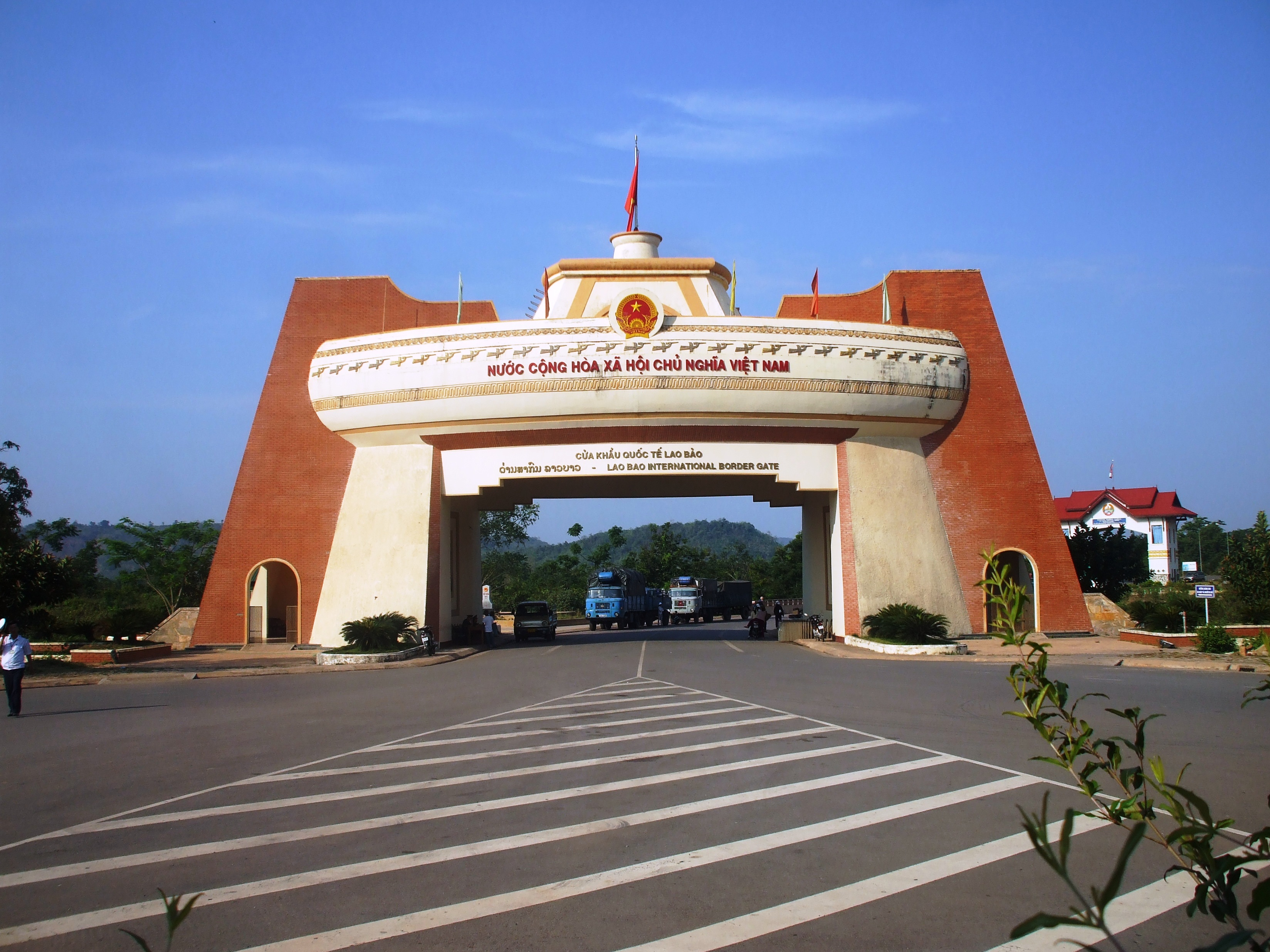
The Lao Bảo international border, between Laos and Vietnam.

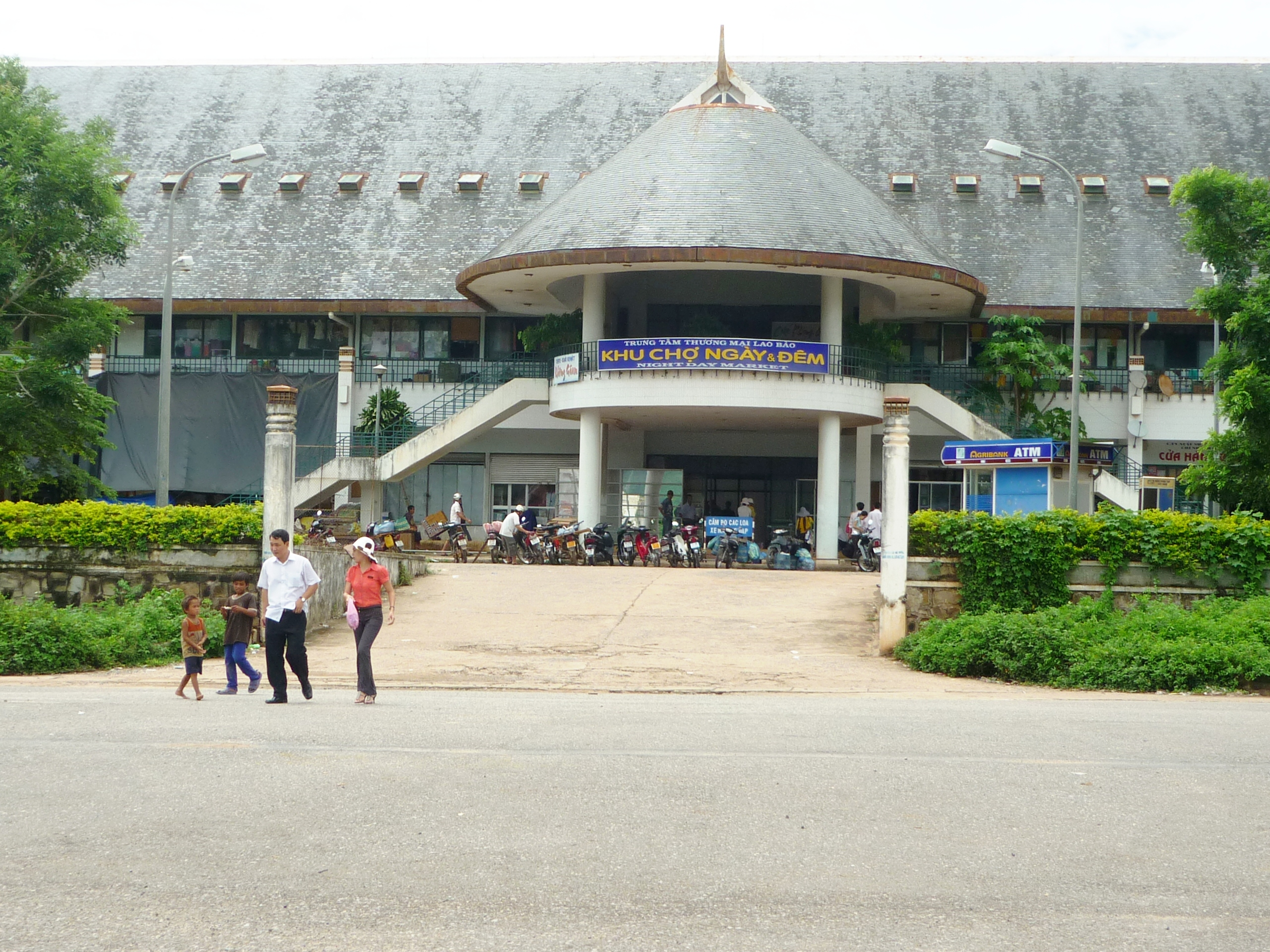
A shopping mall in the Lao Bảo special economic zone.
