= Thanaleng railway station =

Railway station in Laos

Coordinates: 17°54′11″N 102°42′35″E

Thanaleng ທ່ານາແລ້ງ ท่านาแล้ง

General information
- Other names: Dongphosy
- Location: Dongphosy village, Hadxayfong district Vientiane prefecture Laos
- Operator: State Railway of Thailand
- Manager: Lao National Railway State Enterprise
- Platforms: 2
- Tracks: 5

Construction
- Structure type: At-grade
- Parking: Yes

Other information
- Station code: ลล

History
- Opened: 5 March 2009; 17 years ago
- Closed: 19 July 2024; 2 years ago (passenger services)

Services
Preceding station	State Railway of Thailand	Following station
Nong Khai towards Hua Lamphong or Krung Thep Aphiwat	Northeastern Line	Khamsavath (Laos) Terminus
Location
- Location within Laos

Thanaleng station, also known as Dongphosy station (Ban Dong Phosy in Lao), is a freight railway station in Dongphosy village, Hadxayfong district, Vientiane Prefecture, Laos. It is 20 km (12 mi) east of the Lao capital city of Vientiane and 4 km (2.5 mi) north of the Lao-Thai border on the Mekong River. The station opened for cross-border passenger services from Thailand on 5 March 2009, becoming part of the first international railway link serving Laos.

All passenger services were shifted to Khamsavath railway station in 2024. Thanaleng station now operates as a rail freight terminal with the intention of providing low-cost alternative to road freight, the main mode of transport for goods entering Thailand. The station provides a connection between Vientiane and the capital cities of three other ASEAN nations: Thailand, Malaysia, and Singapore, and several major Southeast Asian ports.

== History ==
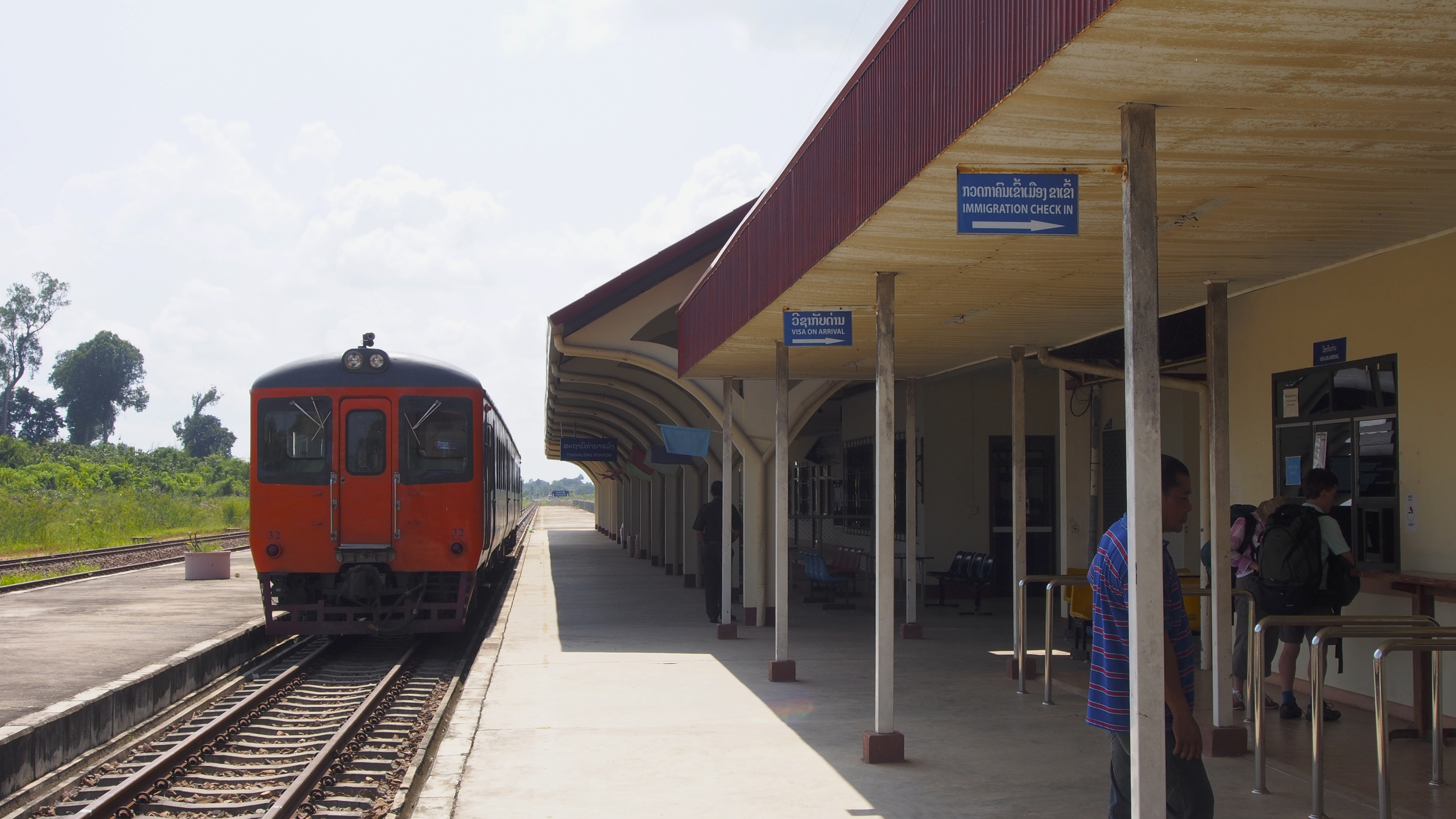
SRT DMU arrived at Thanaleng.

On 20 March 2004, an agreement between the Thai and Lao governments was signed to extend the State Railway of Thailand's Northeastern Line from a junction just south of Nong Khai to Thanaleng, a town on the Lao side of the Mekong. The Thai government agreed to finance the line through a combination of grants and loans. The estimated cost of the Nong Khai–Thanaleng line was US$6.2 million, of which 70% was financed by Thai loans. Construction formally began on 19 January 2007, and test trains began running on 4 July 2008. Formal inauguration occurred on 5 March 2009. Thanaleng Station is the only station of the Bangkok–Thanaleng rail route on the Lao side of the border. The former terminus at Nong Khai and the spur to it was abandoned. Before the construction of the railway across the Friendship Bridge, passengers had to cross the Mekong by ferry. The remains of the former Nong Khai terminus are still present and are visible on Google Earth.

=== Proposed extension ===
On 22 February 2006, after the conclusion of a trilateral agreement among Thailand, Laos, and France, the French Development Agency announced that it had approved funding for a second phase of the Thanaleng railway—an extension to Vientiane. The cost of this second phase was estimated at US$13.2 million, including the cost of feasibility studies, infrastructure, and equipment. A US$50 million loan was also reportedly received from the Thai government for the extension. Construction was originally slated to begin in December 2010, and Lao railway officials had confirmed as late as September 2010 that plans would go ahead. The extension, which would have taken an estimated three years to complete, would have stretched 9 km (5.6 mi) from Thanaleng to a new main Khamsavath station in Khamsavath village in Vientiane's Xaysetha District, 4 km (2.5 mi) away from That Luang Temple. Khamsavath station was completed in May 2023 and its scheduled to open in the middle of the year. The station was officially opened in October 31, 2023.

After reviewing the project, Lao officials decided that Thanaleng station would be converted into a terminal for freight trains crossing over the Thai–Lao Friendship Bridge; freight could then be transported from Bangkok into Laos at a lower cost than would be possible with road transport. On 4 December 2021, a day after opening the China–Laos railway, the Vientiane Logistics Park, one of a total of nine logistics centers in Laos, was officially opened by Prime Minister Phankham Viphavanh at Thanaleng.

In July 2022, the transhipment yard between the Laos-Thai meter gauge railway and the Laos–China standard gauge railway was officially inaugurated at Thanaleng / Vientiane South.

Thailand decided to finance its part of the route itself, although only the high-speed route Bangkok – Nakhon Ratchasima is to be built for the time being. After several postponements, the Bangkok (Krung Thep Aphiwat Central Terminal) to Nakhon Ratchasima high-speed rail project (Phase 1) was officially launched by the Thai government in October 2020. However, the Nakhon Ratchasima to Nong Khai section (Phase 2) and the Nong Khai to Vientiane section (Phase 3) has not yet been confirmed.

=== Closure of passenger services ===
Following the opening of Khamsavath railway station, Thanaleng was closed to passenger service and became a freight-only railway station.

== Former services ==
- Local No. 481/482 Nong Khai–Thanaleng–Nong Khai
- Local No. 483/484 Nong Khai–Thanaleng–Nong Khai

== See also ==
- Transport in Laos
- Kunming–Singapore railway
- Boten–Vientiane railway
