= Chiang Klang district =

Chiang Klang เชียงกลาง
- District
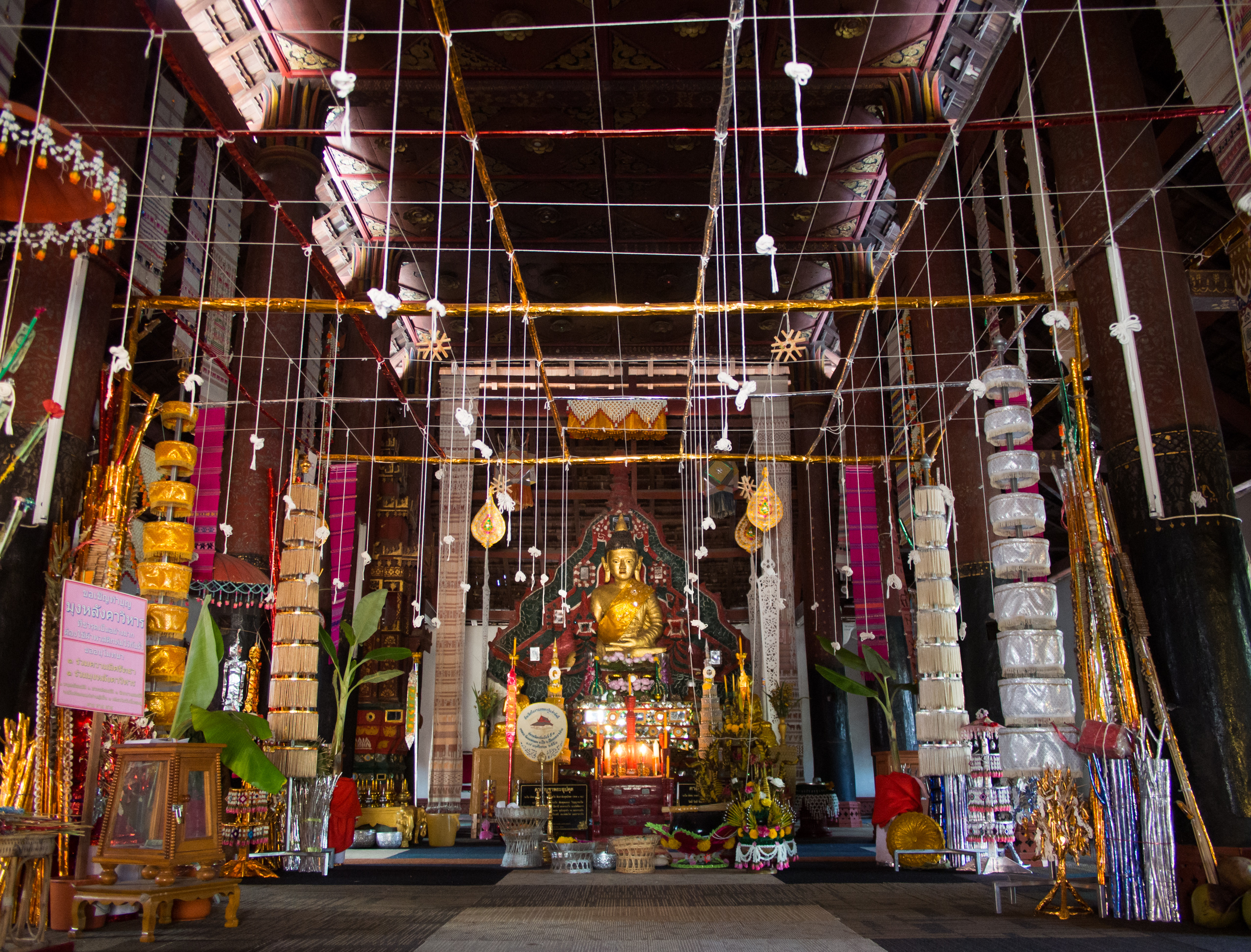
- Inside the ubosot of Wat Nong Daeng

- District location in Nan province
- Coordinates: 19°17′30″N 100°51′42″E
- Country: Thailand
- Province: Nan

Government
  - Marshal: Prasat Parkthup

Area
  - Total: 277.115 km^{2} (106.995 sq mi)

Population (2009)
  - Total: 28,234
  - Density: 101.89/km^{2} (263.88/sq mi)
- Time zone: UTC+7 (ICT)
- Postal code: 55160
- Geocode: 5509

Chiang Klang (Thai: เชียงกลาง, pronounced [tɕʰīaŋ klāːŋ]; Northern Thai: ᨩ᩠ᨿᨦᨠᩖᩣ᩠ᨦ, pronounced [tɕīaŋ kǎːŋ]) is a district (amphoe) in the northern part of Nan province, northern Thailand.

== Geography ==
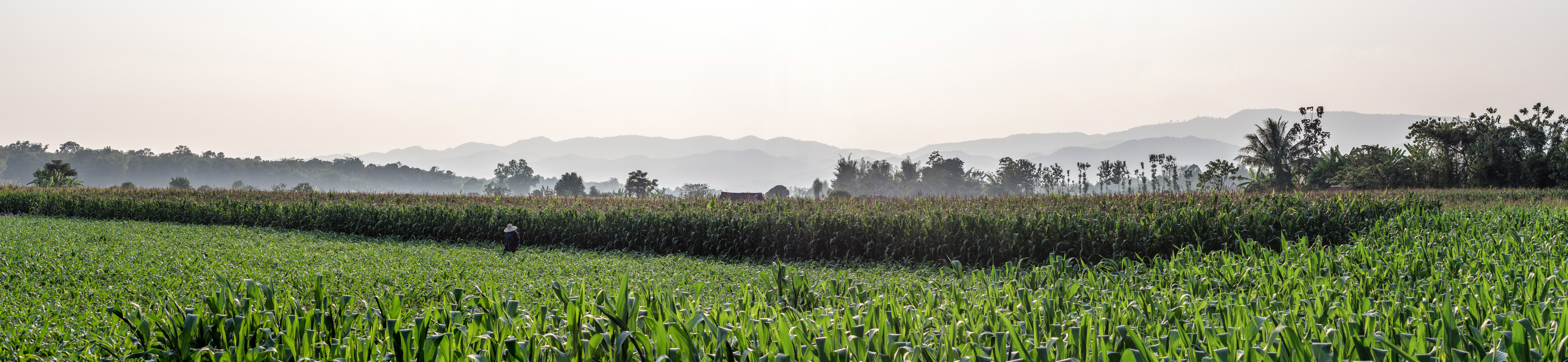
South of Chiang Klang. The mountains to the west are part of the Phi Pan Nam Range

Neighbouring districts are, from the north clockwise, Thung Chang, Pua, Tha Wang Pha and Song Khwae.

The eastern part of the district is in the Luang Prabang Range mountain area of the Thai highlands.

== History ==
The minor district (king amphoe) was created on 20 June 1968, when the four tambons, Puea, Chiang Klang, Chiang Khan, and Na Rai Luang, were split off from Thung Chang district. It was upgraded to a full district on 16 November 1971.

== Administration ==
The district is divided into six sub-districts (tambons), which are further subdivided into 59 villages (mubans). There are two townships (thesaban tambon) in Chiang Klang District. The first one is Chiang Klang, which covers parts of tambon Chiang Klang, Puea, and Phaya Kaeo. Another is Phra Phutthabat Chiang Khan, which covers tambons Phra Phutthabat and Chiang Khan. There are a further four tambon administrative organizations (TAO).

No.	Name	Thai name	Villages	Pop.
1.	Chiang Klang	เชียงกลาง	12	7,643
2.	Puea	เปือ	15	6,970
3.	Chiang Khan	เชียงคาน	5	1,699
4.	Phra That	พระธาตุ	10	3,860
8.	Phaya Kaeo	พญาแก้ว	7	3,412
9.	Phra Phutthabat	พระพุทธบาท	10	5,289

The missing numbers are the tambon which now form Song Khwae District.

== Gallery ==
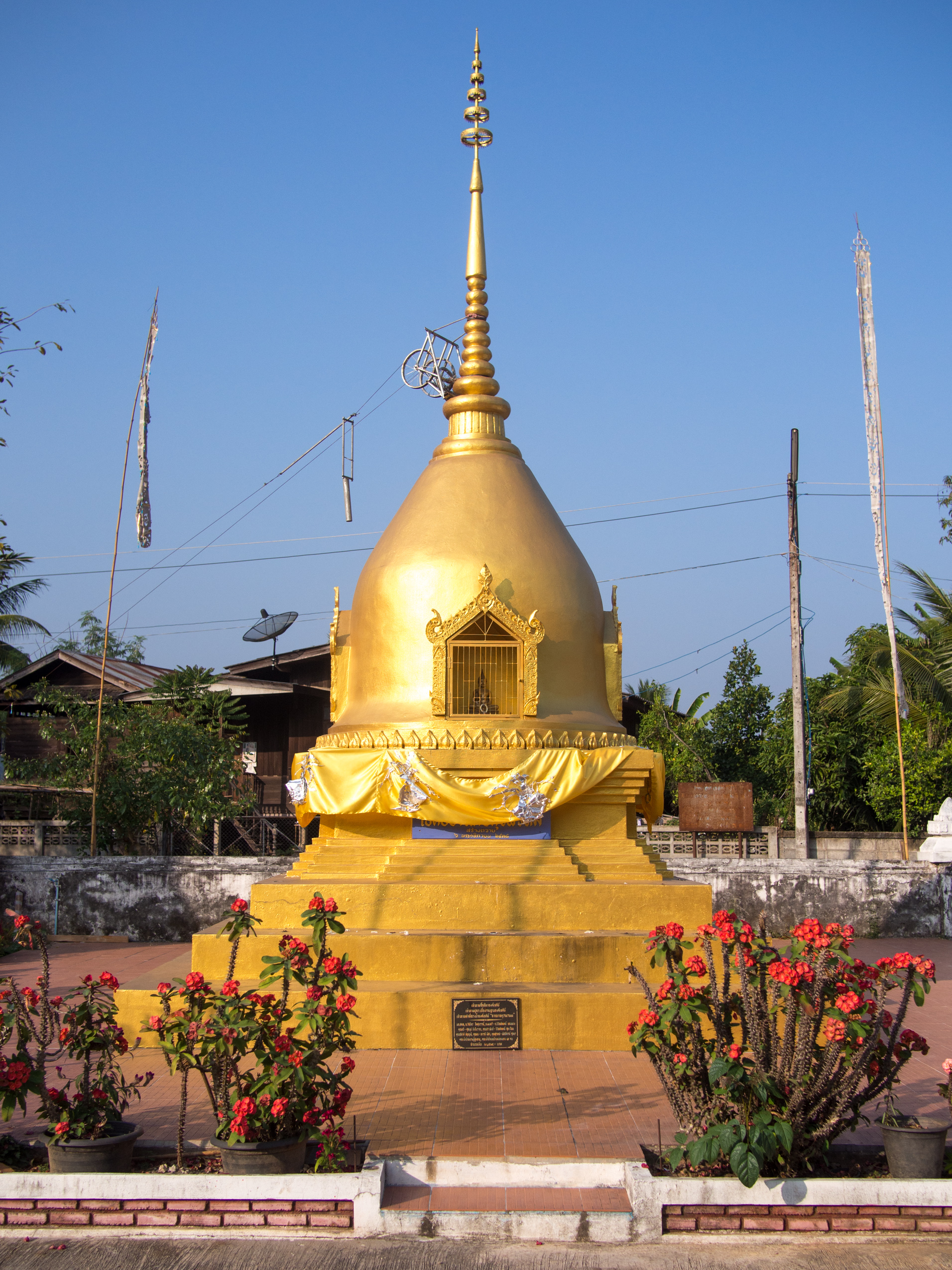
The chedi of Wat Nong Daeng

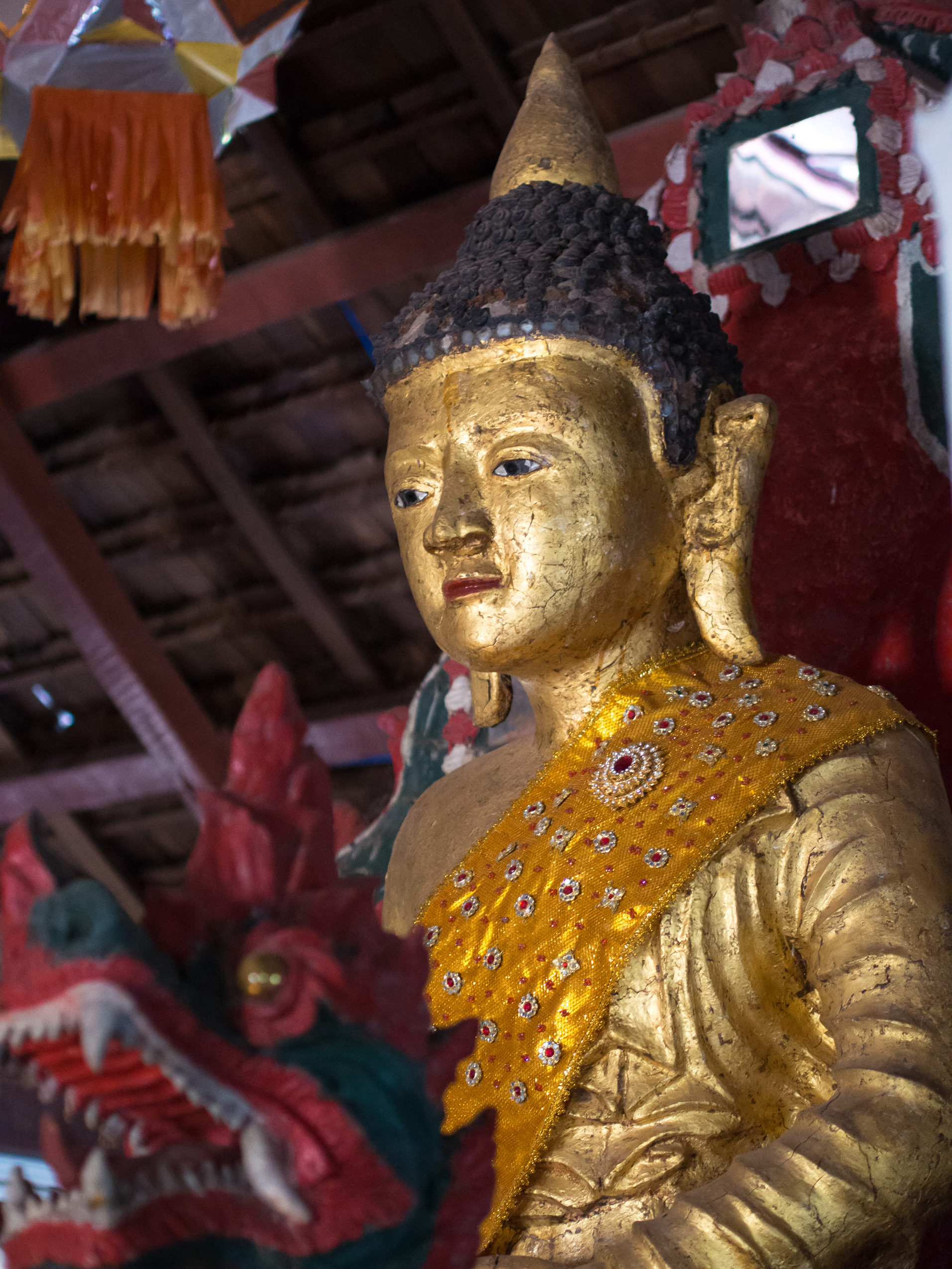
The main Buddha image of Wat Nong Daeng
