= Thung Chang district =

Thung Chang ทุ่งช้าง
- District
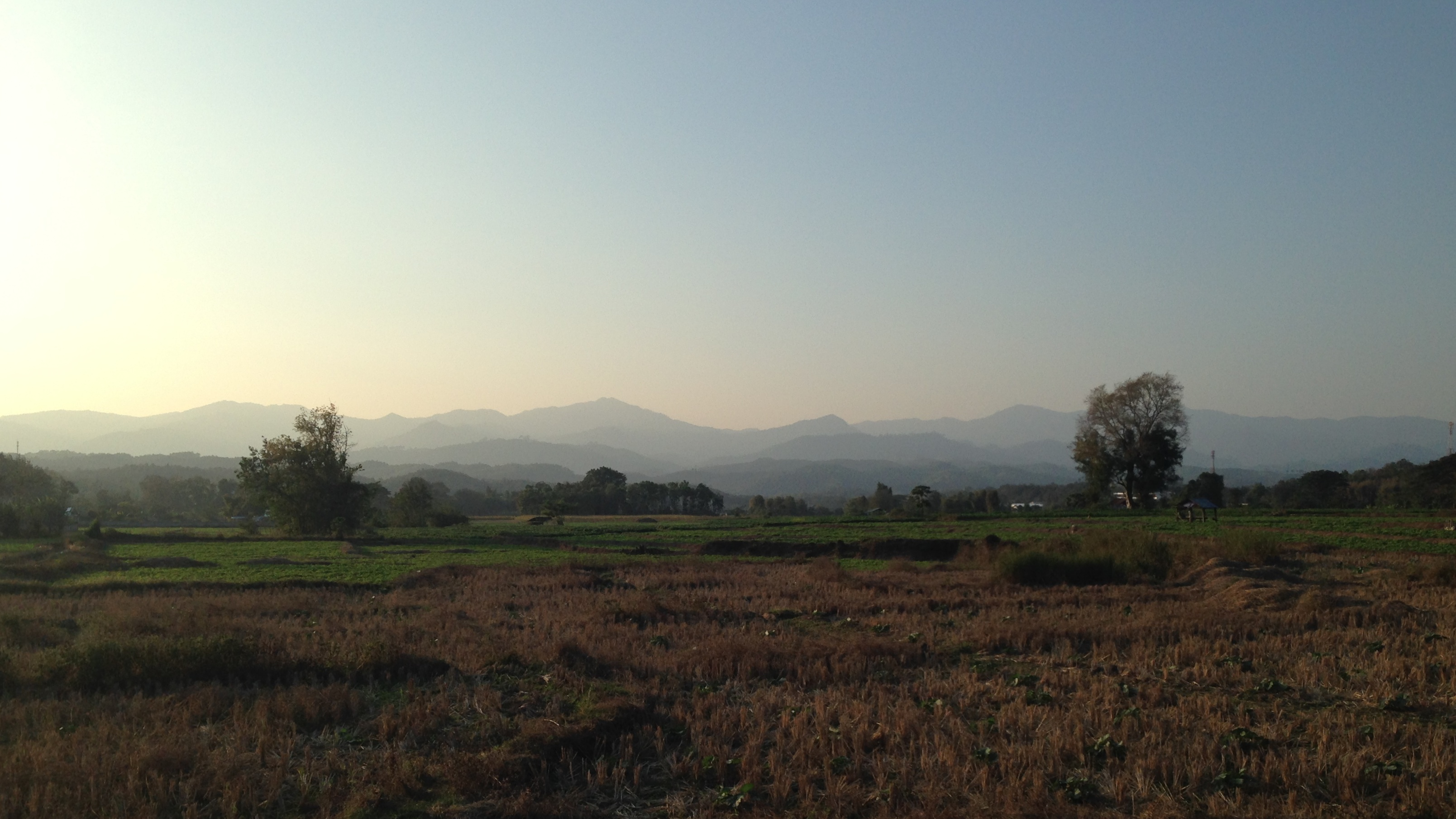

- District location in Nan province
- Coordinates: 19°23′14″N 100°52′33″E
- Country: Thailand
- Province: Nan

Government
  - District officer: Kiansak Pomthongkham

Area
  - Total: 760.811 km^{2} (293.751 sq mi)

Population (2013)
  - Total: 18,375
  - Density: 24.152/km^{2} (62.553/sq mi)
- Time zone: UTC+7 (ICT)
- Postal code: 55130
- Geocode: 5508

Thung Chang (Thai: ทุ่งช้าง, pronounced [tʰûŋ tɕʰáːŋ]; Northern Thai: ᨴ᩵ᩩᨦᨩ᩶ᩣ᩠ᨩ, pronounced [tôːŋ tɕáːŋ]) is a district (amphoe) in the northern part of Nan province, northern Thailand.

== History ==
Thung Chang District dates back to the Khwaeng Khun Nan (ขุนน่าน), which was converted into the district Lae (และ) in 1914. In 1961 it was renamed Thung Chang, as the district office had been moved to tambon Thung Chang.

== Geography ==
Neighboring districts are, from the east clockwise, Chaloem Phra Kiat, Pua, Chiang Klang and Song Khwae of Nan Province. To the north is Xaignabouli of Laos.

The eastern part of the district is in the Luang Prabang Range of the Thai highlands.

== Climate ==
Climate data for Thung Chang (1981–2010, extremes 1997-present)
Month	Jan	Feb	Mar	Apr	May	Jun	Jul	Aug	Sep	Oct	Nov	Dec	Year
Record high °C (°F)	35.8 (96.4)	36.5 (97.7)	39.2 (102.6)	41.6 (106.9)	41.5 (106.7)	37.5 (99.5)	36.8 (98.2)	36.5 (97.7)	35.0 (95.0)	35.0 (95.0)	34.4 (93.9)	33.5 (92.3)	41.6 (106.9)
Mean daily maximum °C (°F)	29.7 (85.5)	32.0 (89.6)	34.1 (93.4)	34.9 (94.8)	32.8 (91.0)	31.8 (89.2)	30.7 (87.3)	30.6 (87.1)	31.2 (88.2)	31.3 (88.3)	30.2 (86.4)	28.8 (83.8)	31.5 (88.7)
Daily mean °C (°F)	20.4 (68.7)	22.1 (71.8)	24.8 (76.6)	27.2 (81.0)	27.0 (80.6)	27.1 (80.8)	26.5 (79.7)	26.3 (79.3)	26.0 (78.8)	25.3 (77.5)	22.5 (72.5)	20.4 (68.7)	24.6 (76.3)
Mean daily minimum °C (°F)	13.5 (56.3)	14.7 (58.5)	17.4 (63.3)	21.2 (70.2)	22.9 (73.2)	23.8 (74.8)	23.6 (74.5)	23.5 (74.3)	22.8 (73.0)	21.1 (70.0)	17.1 (62.8)	14.4 (57.9)	19.7 (67.5)
Record low °C (°F)	7.0 (44.6)	6.4 (43.5)	10.5 (50.9)	14.2 (57.6)	18.0 (64.4)	21.0 (69.8)	20.0 (68.0)	21.4 (70.5)	17.5 (63.5)	13.6 (56.5)	9.3 (48.7)	2.6 (36.7)	2.6 (36.7)
Average rainfall mm (inches)	22.5 (0.89)	15.3 (0.60)	46.2 (1.82)	120.5 (4.74)	220.1 (8.67)	216.2 (8.51)	328.2 (12.92)	386.7 (15.22)	270.0 (10.63)	90.5 (3.56)	20.5 (0.81)	13.4 (0.53)	1,750.1 (68.90)
Average rainy days	2.0	1.5	4.3	10.0	18.0	17.8	21.7	24.5	18.4	10.7	3.2	1.2	133.3
Average relative humidity (%)	78.7	74.0	71.0	74.7	82.2	85.0	87.3	88.8	87.4	84.5	80.0	78.8	81.0
Mean monthly sunshine hours	322.4	305.1	350.3	279.0	220.1	198.0	161.2	117.8	183.0	269.7	264.0	285.2	2,955.8
Source 1: Thai Meteorological Department
Source 2: Office of Water Management and Hydrology, Royal Irrigation Department (sun)

== Administration ==
=== Central administration ===
Thung Chang is divided into four sub-districts (tambons), which are further subdivided into 40 administrative villages (mubans).

No.	Name	Thai	Villages	Pop.
1.	Pon	ปอน	8	2,761
2.	Ngop	งอบ	11	5,551
3.	Lae	และ	14	4,642
4.	Thung Chang	ทุ่งช้าง	7	5,421

=== Local administration ===
There are two sub-district municipalities (thesaban tambons) in the district:

- Ngop (Thai: เทศบาลตำบลงอบ) consisting of sub-district Ngop.
- Thung Chang (Thai: เทศบาลตำบลทุ่งช้าง) consisting of parts of sub-districts Lae and Thung Chang.

There are three sub-district administrative organizations (SAO) in the district:

- Pon (Thai: องค์การบริหารส่วนตำบลปอน) consisting of sub-district Pon.
- Lae (Thai: องค์การบริหารส่วนตำบลและ) consisting of parts of sub-district Lae.
- Thung Chang (Thai: องค์การบริหารส่วนตำบลทุ่งช้าง) consisting of parts of sub-district Thung Chang.
