= AH11 =

Asian Highway route in Laos and Cambodia

Asian Highway 11

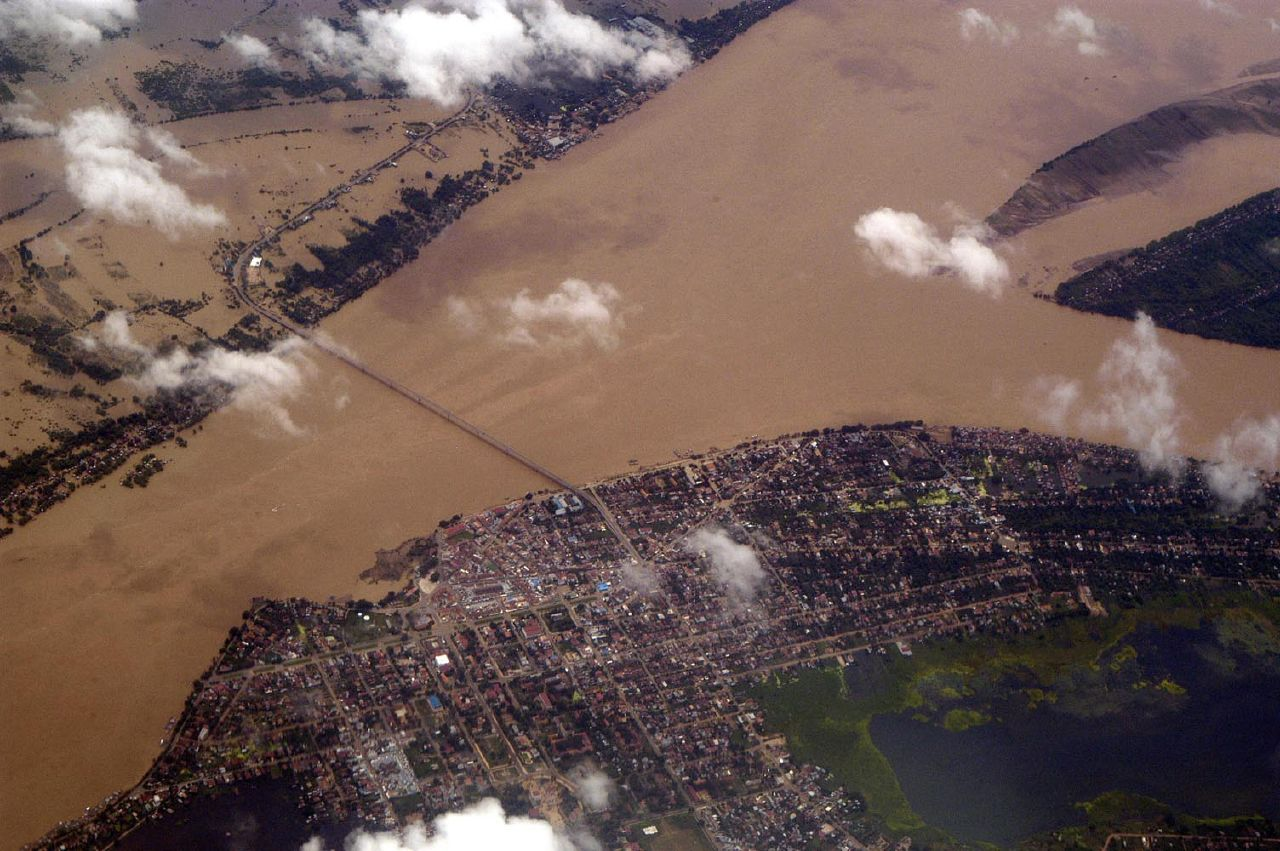
- Kizuna Bridge across Mekong river on AH11

Route information
- Length: 1,567 km (974 mi)

Major junctions
- North end: Vientiane, Laos
- South end: Sihanoukville, Cambodia

Location
- Countries: Laos; Cambodia

Highway system
- Asian Highway Network
← AH9	→ AH12

Asian Highway 11 (AH11) is a road in the Asian Highway Network running 1567 km from Vientiane, Laos to Sihanoukville, Cambodia connecting AH12 to AH1 and continuing to Gulf of Thailand. This international highway connects capitals of Laos and Cambodia.

== Associated routes ==
=== Laos ===
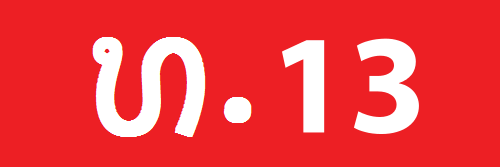
- Route 13: Vientiane - Vieng Kham (Concurrency with AH15 begins) - Thakhek (Concurrency with AH15 ends) - Xeno (concurrent with AH11 for 3 km) - Veun Kham. (753 km (468 mi))

=== Cambodia ===
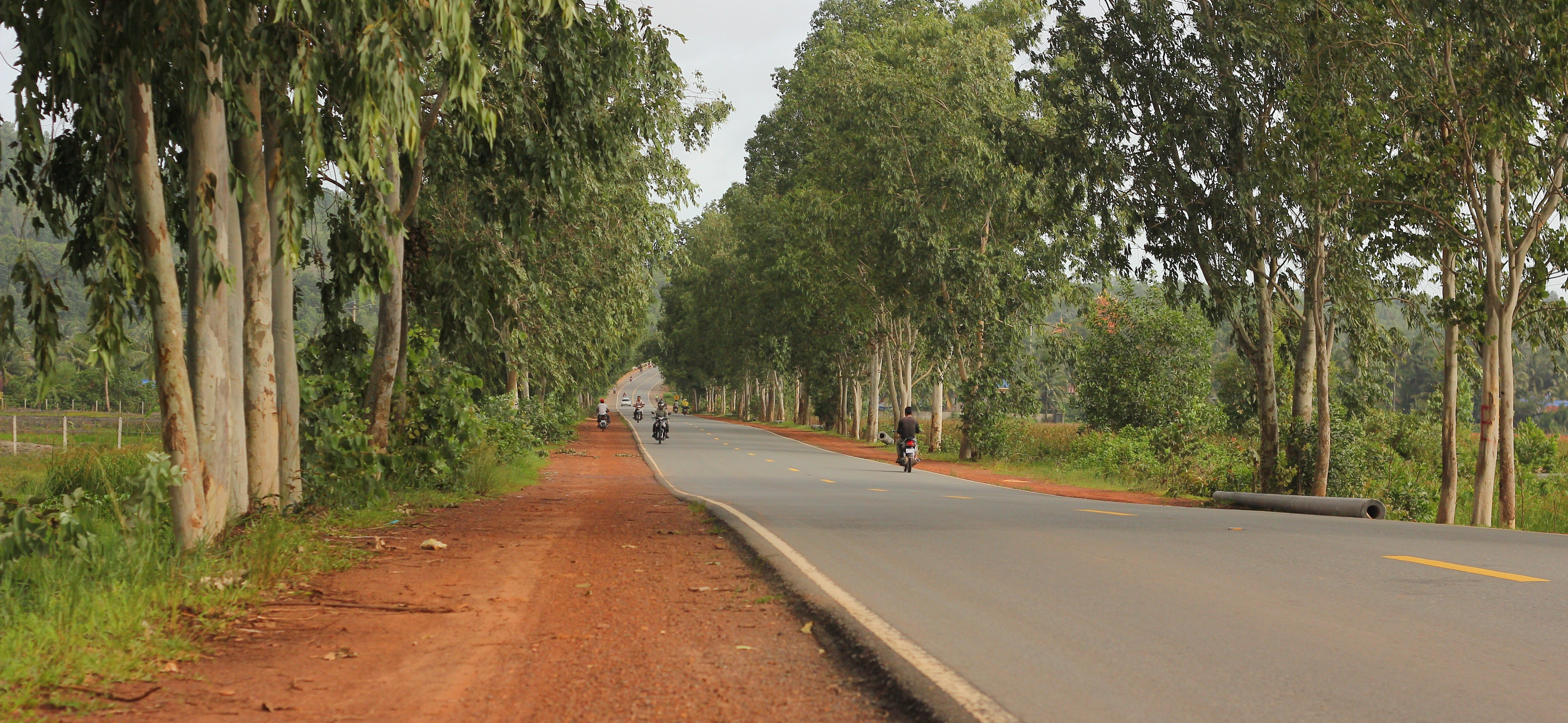
NR4 near Ream National Park

- Highway 7: Dong Calor - Skuon (509 km (316 mi))
- Highway 6A: Skuon - Phnom Penh ( AH1) (73 km (45 mi))
- Highway 4: Phnom Penh - Sihanoukville (230 km (140 mi))
- : Phnom Penh-Sihanoukville Expressway (187 km (116 mi))

== Junctions ==
Laos
AH12 Vientiane
AH131 Ban Lao
AH15 Thakhek
AH16 Seno
Cambodia
AH1 near Harbin

== See also ==
- List of Asian Highways
