= Sepon River =

River in Vietnam and Laos

Coordinates: 16.6906°N 106.2177°E

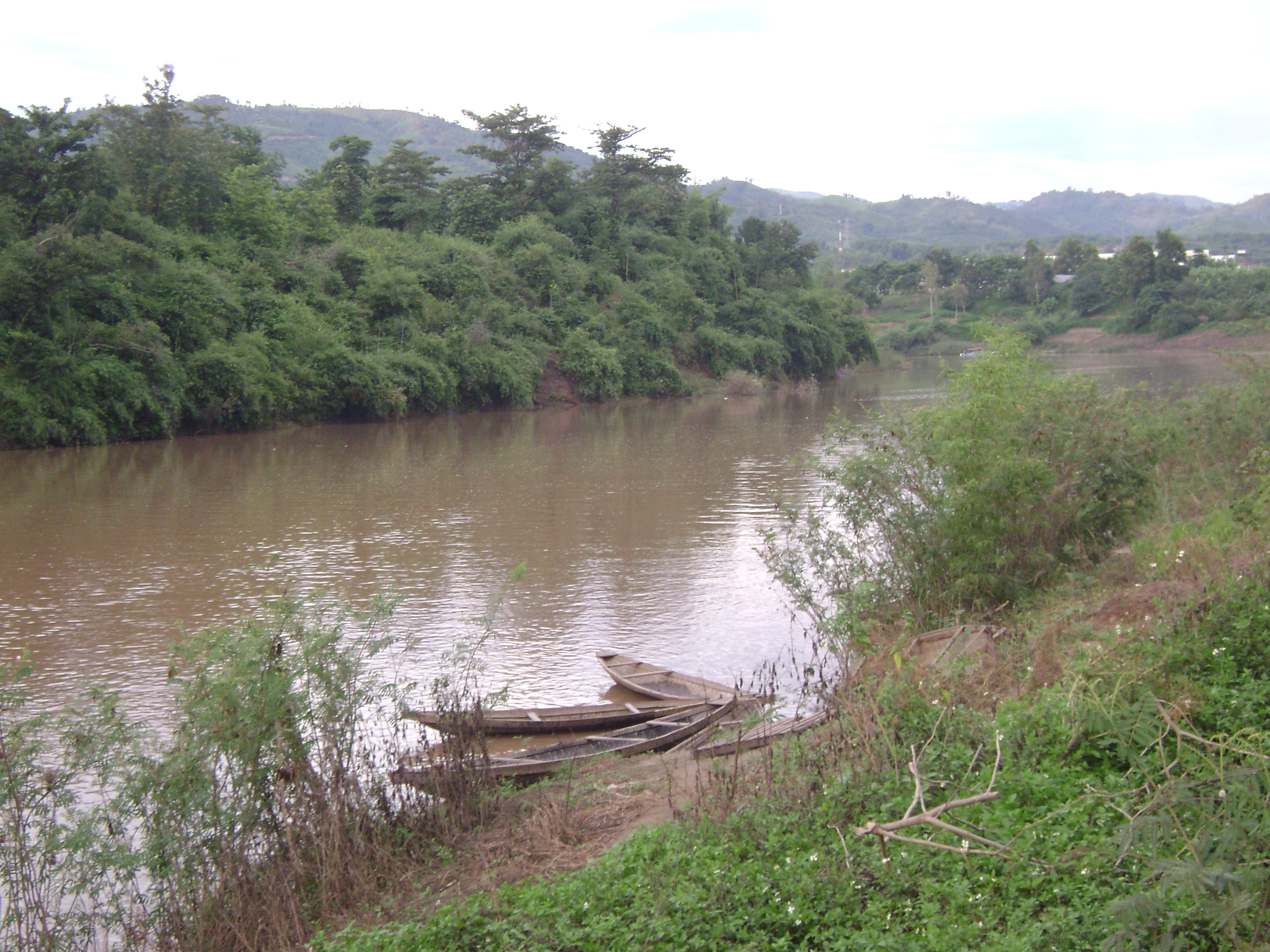
The Sepon River at Lao Bảo, Vietnam

The Sepon River (Vietnamese: Sông Xê-pôn, Lao: Se Pon) is a small river at Lao Bảo border area of Quảng Trị province, Vietnam and Savannakhet province of Laos. It forms a border between Vietnam and Laos. One side of the river belongs to Vietnam and other belongs to Laos.

The Sepon River is only 1m deep and approximately 100m wide. The water is fresh and clean in summer because it is not near any industry. Surrounding the Sepon River is jungle.

The Sepon River belongs to the Hướng Hóa district of Vietnam and Savannakhet Province of Laos. Therefore, it is a main artery for the two nearby urban areas (the town of Lao Bảo and the city of Savannakhet). The river enables cross-border trade and commerce between Lao Bảo and Savannakhet. Every day, there are several motor boats laden with goods coming and going across the river. The Sepon is also regarded as a minor trade artery linking Vietnam and Thailand. In addition, one can cross into Laos from Vietnam by motorboat, which takes about 30 minutes to arrive at Savannakhet.
