= National Highway 4 (Cambodia) =

National Highway in Cambodia

National Highway 4

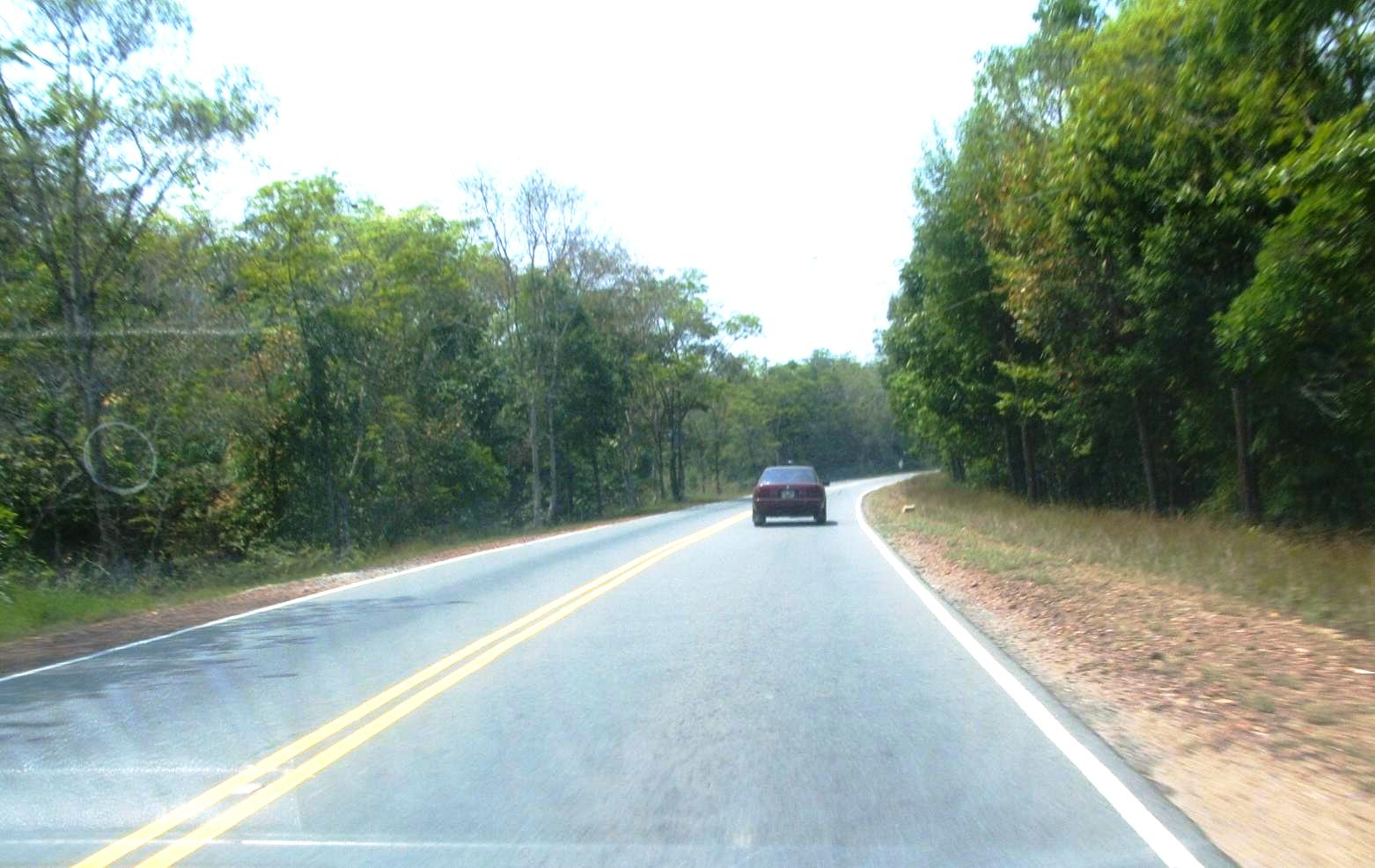
- National Highway 4

Route information
- Part of AH11

Location
- Country: Cambodia

Highway system
- Transport in Cambodia

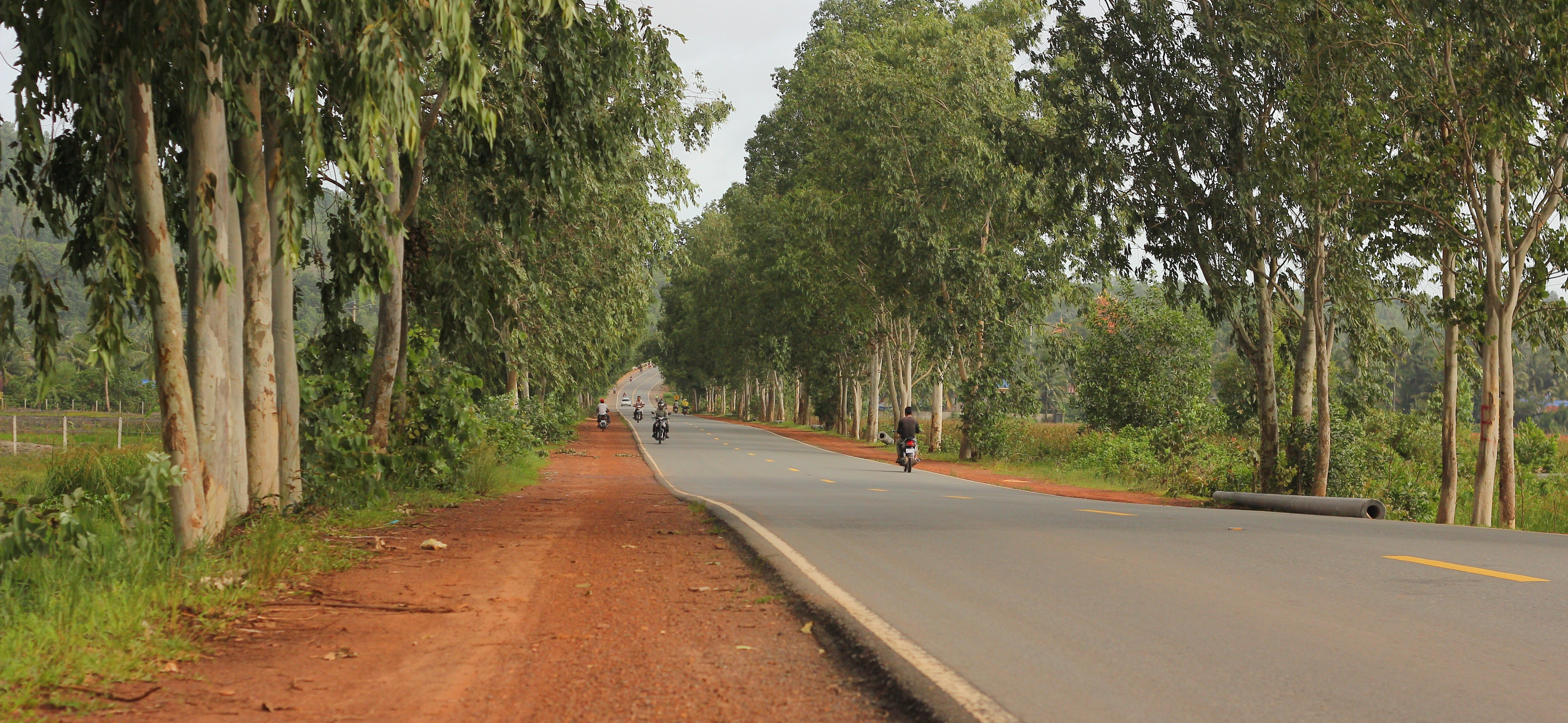
National Highway 4 about Ream.

National Highway 4 or National Road No.4 (10004) (in Khmer ផ្លូវជាតិលេខ ៤) is one of the national highways of Cambodia. With a length of 230 km (140 mi), it connects the capital of Phnom Penh with Sihanoukville in the south-west. Sihanoukville is the only international sea port of Cambodia, making NH4 one of the country's most important highways. The road was built in the 1950s, coinciding with the construction of the port.

The road was built especially for the transport of goods between the capital and the port, by heavy trucks and containers. Portions of NH4 were considered toll roads, with three stations to collect fees. All toll stations have now been removed, the entire road is now toll free. It is also considered the most dangerous road in Cambodia due to the occurrence of several traffic accidents and limited management by authorities. Furthermore, the road is congested and in need of maintenance.

== Description ==
The road begins at the junction of Pochentong Avenue and National Highway 3. The junction, located in western Phnom Penh near the Phnom Penh International Airport, is in the Sangkat Chaom Chau – Dangkor District. The road initially heads westerly then curves toward the south west.

After the first toll station, NH4 enters Kandal Province. It then crosses Kampong Speu, Koh Kong and Sihanoukville provinces. In the territory of Koh Kong, at Chamkar Luong, National Road 48 branches off west toward Koh Kong town and the Khmer-Thai border. The junction with NH3, which leads to Kampot to the east beyond to the Vietnamese border is in the territory of Sihanoukville, at Prey Nob District.

== Phnom Penh-Sihanoukville Expressway ==
A 190-km long expressway parallel to highway 4 opened to the public on October 1, 2022 as Cambodia's first expressway that allows the travel time between Phnom Penh and Sihanoukville to be halved from 6 hours. The expressway, built through Chinese investment at a cost of $2 billion under a build-operate-transfer contract by China Road and Bridge Corporation, has two lanes in each direction, with a speed limit of 120 km/h (75 mph) for light vehicles, 100 km/h (62 mph) for two axle trucks and buses and 80 km/h (50 mph) for shipping container trucks with a minimum speed of 60 km/h (37 mph) for all vehicles. Toll fees range from 0.08 USD/km for passenger cars to 0.40 USD/km for trucks over 20 tons. Usage of this expressway is limited to cars, buses, and trucks that weigh under 40 metric tons and measure under 5.2m.
