= Chaloem Phra Kiat district, Nan =

Chaloem Phra Kiat เฉลิมพระเกียรติ
- District
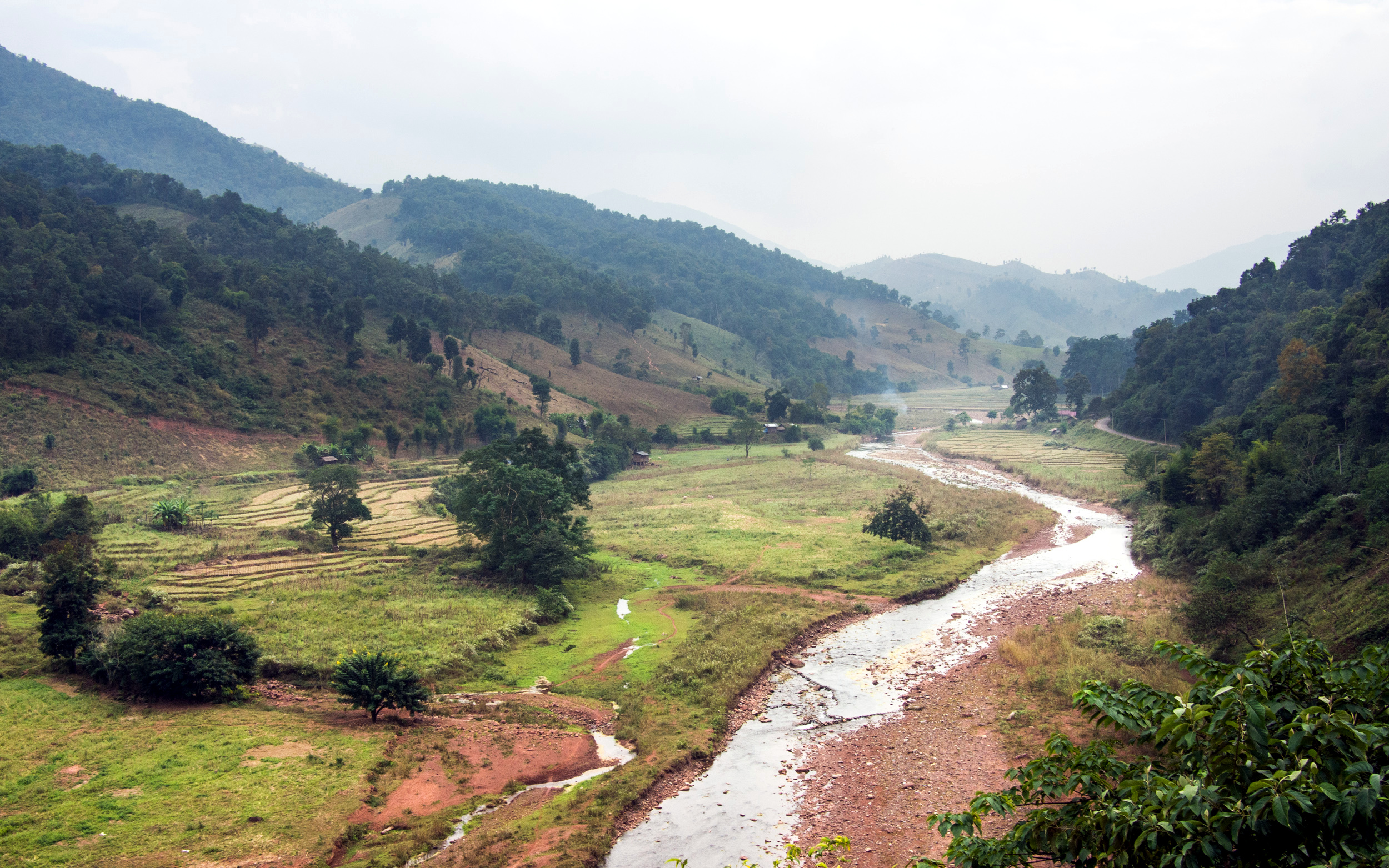
- A river flowing near the Khun Nan National Park

- District location in Nan province
- Coordinates: 19°34′45″N 101°4′52″E
- Country: Thailand
- Province: Nan

Government
  - Marshal: Chusak Rooying

Area
  - Total: 518.690 km^{2} (200.267 sq mi)

Population (2010)
  - Total: 9,347
  - Density: 18.02/km^{2} (46.67/sq mi)
- Time zone: UTC+7 (ICT)
- Postal code: 55130
- Geocode: 5515

Chaloem Phra Kiat (Thai: เฉลิมพระเกียรติ, pronounced [t͡ɕʰā.lɤ̌ːm pʰráʔ kìa̯t]) is a district (amphoe) of Nan province, northern Thailand.

== History ==
The district was created on 5 December 1996, together with four other districts named Chaloem Phra Kiat in celebration of the 50th anniversary of King Bhumibol Adulyadej's ascension to the throne.

The area of the district was created from two districts. Tambon Huai Kon was previously part of Thung Chang district, while Khun Nan came from Bo Kluea district.

== Geography ==
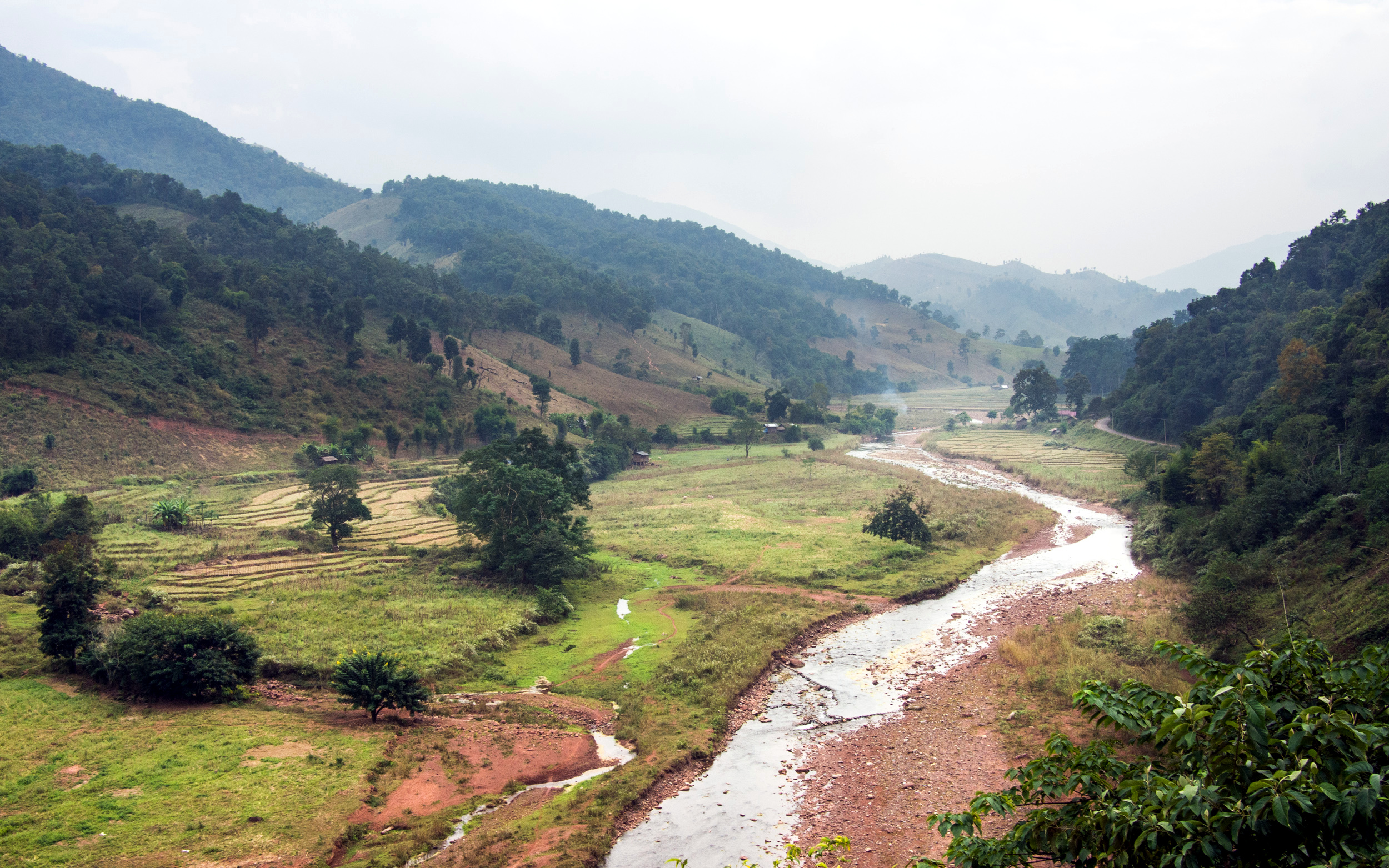
The Nan River in Chaloem Phra Kiat District, near its source, is barely more than a stream during the dry season

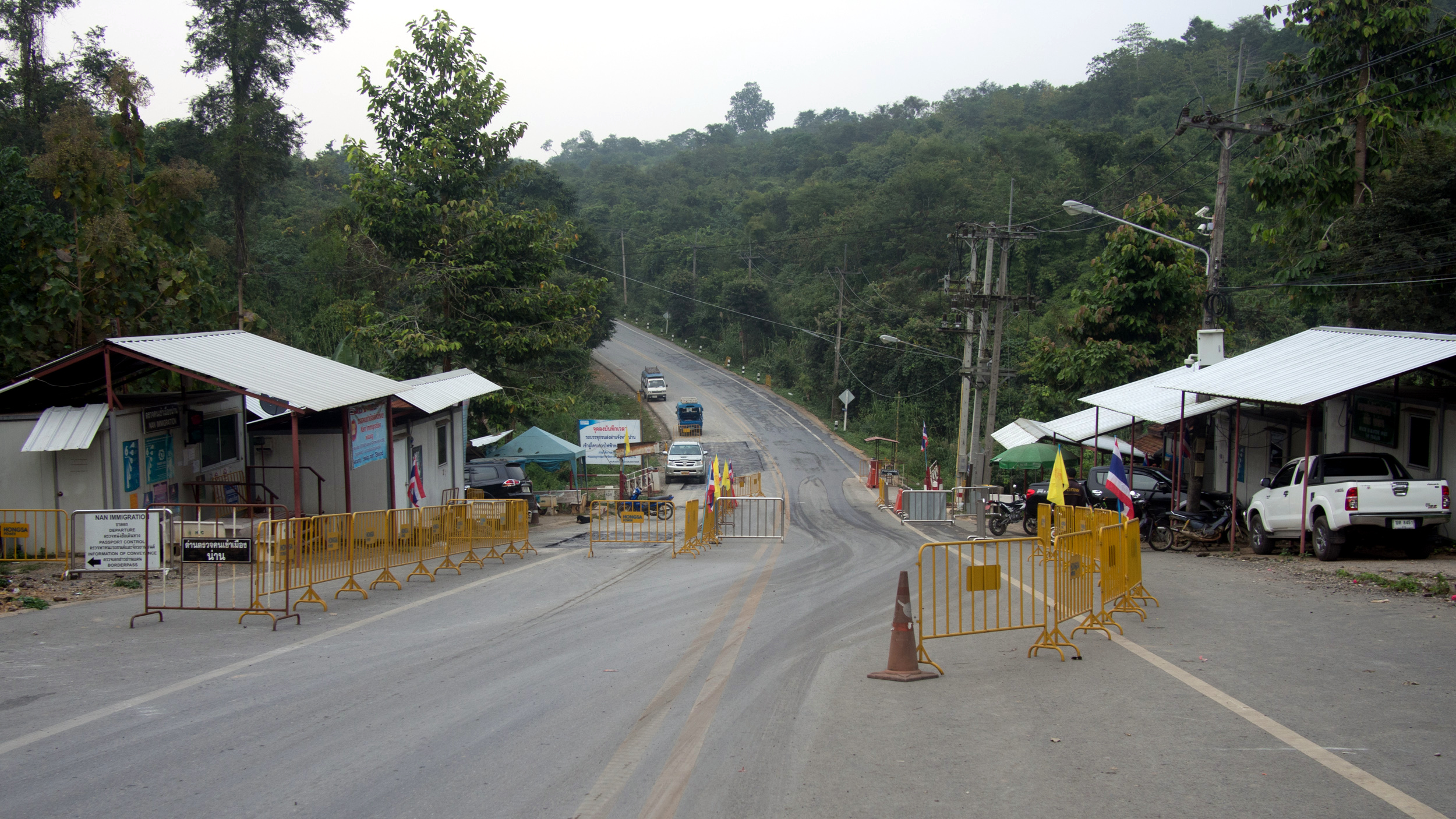
Huai Kon border crossing between Thailand and Laos

Neighboring districts are (from the south clockwise) Bo Kluea, Pua, and Thung Chang. To the northeast is Xaignabouli province of Laos with an international border crossing at Huay Kon/Muang Ngeun.

The district is in the Luang Prabang Range mountain area of the Thai highlands.

== Administration ==
The district is divided into two sub-districts (tambons), which are further subdivided into 22 villages (mubans). There are no municipal (thesaban) areas, and two tambon administrative organizations (TAO).

| No. | Name | Thai name | Villages | Pop. |
| 1. | Huai Kon | ห้วยโก๋น | 7 | 2,894 |
| 2. | Khun Nan | ขุนน่าน | 15 | 6,493 |
