= Hadxayfong district =

Hadxayfong district ຫາດຊາຍຟອງ
- District
- Location in Laos
- Coordinates: 17°53′27″N 102°44′33″E
- Country: Laos
- Province: Vientiane Prefecture
- District: Hadxayfong

Population (2015)
  - District: 97,609
  - Urban: 86,133
- Time zone: UTC+7 (ICT)

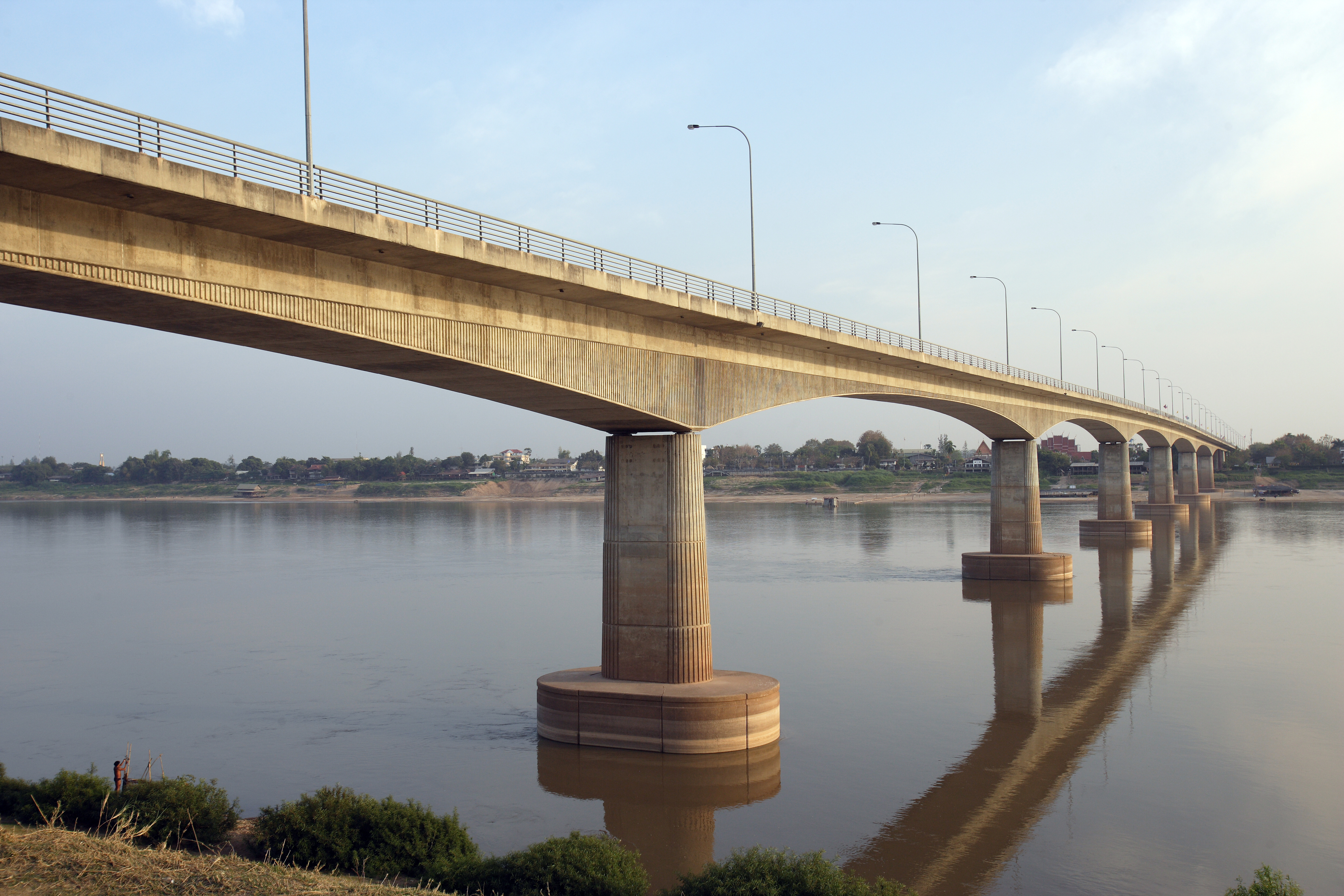
First Thai-Lao Friendship Bridge

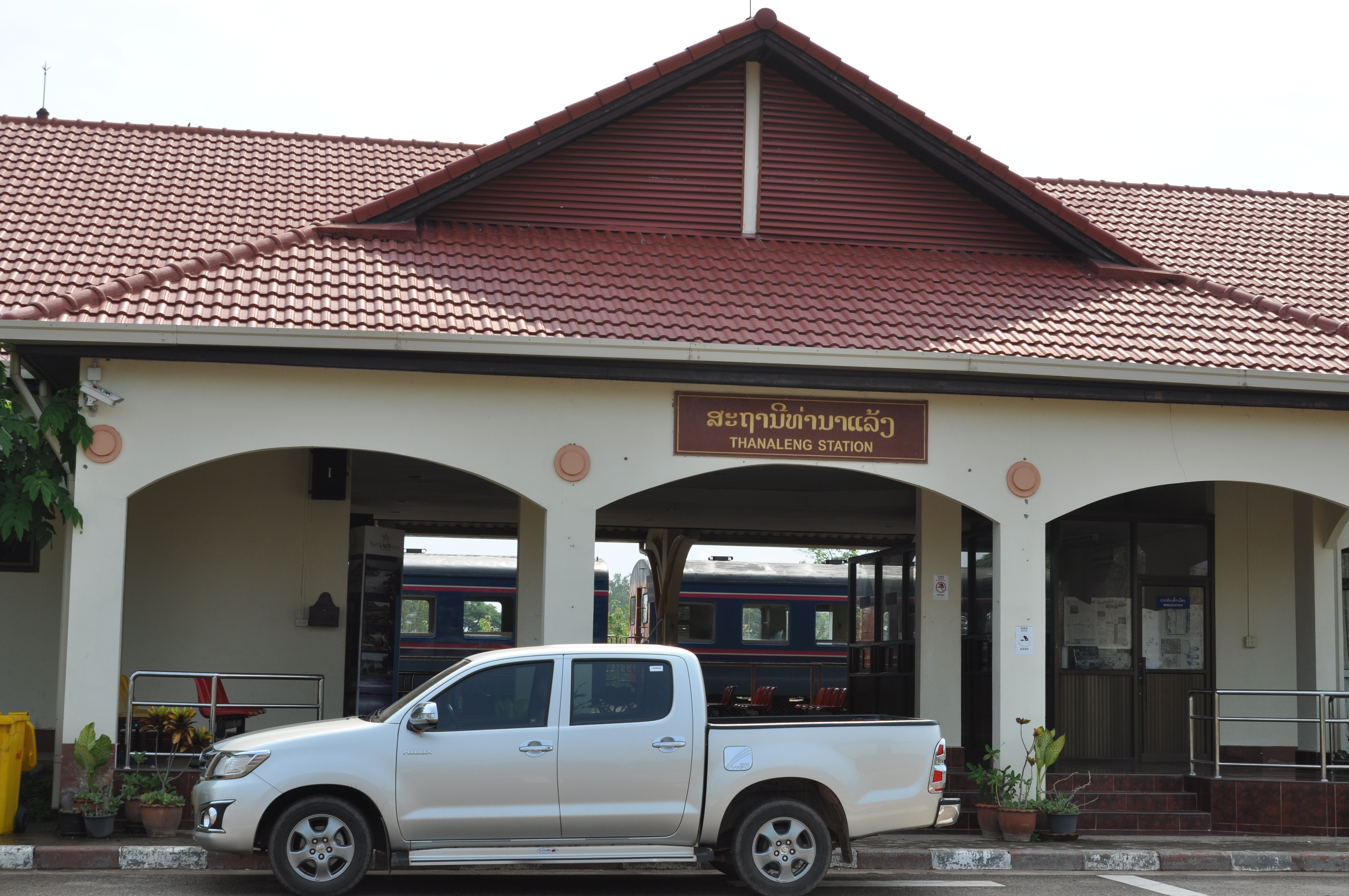
Thanaleng railway station

Hadxayfong (Lao: ຫາດຊາຍຟອງ) is a district of Vientiane Prefecture, Laos. Located about 20 kilometers southeast of Vientiane Capital, along the Mekong River, where the river bends near wide rice fields and Vientiane's largest sandbank.

== History ==
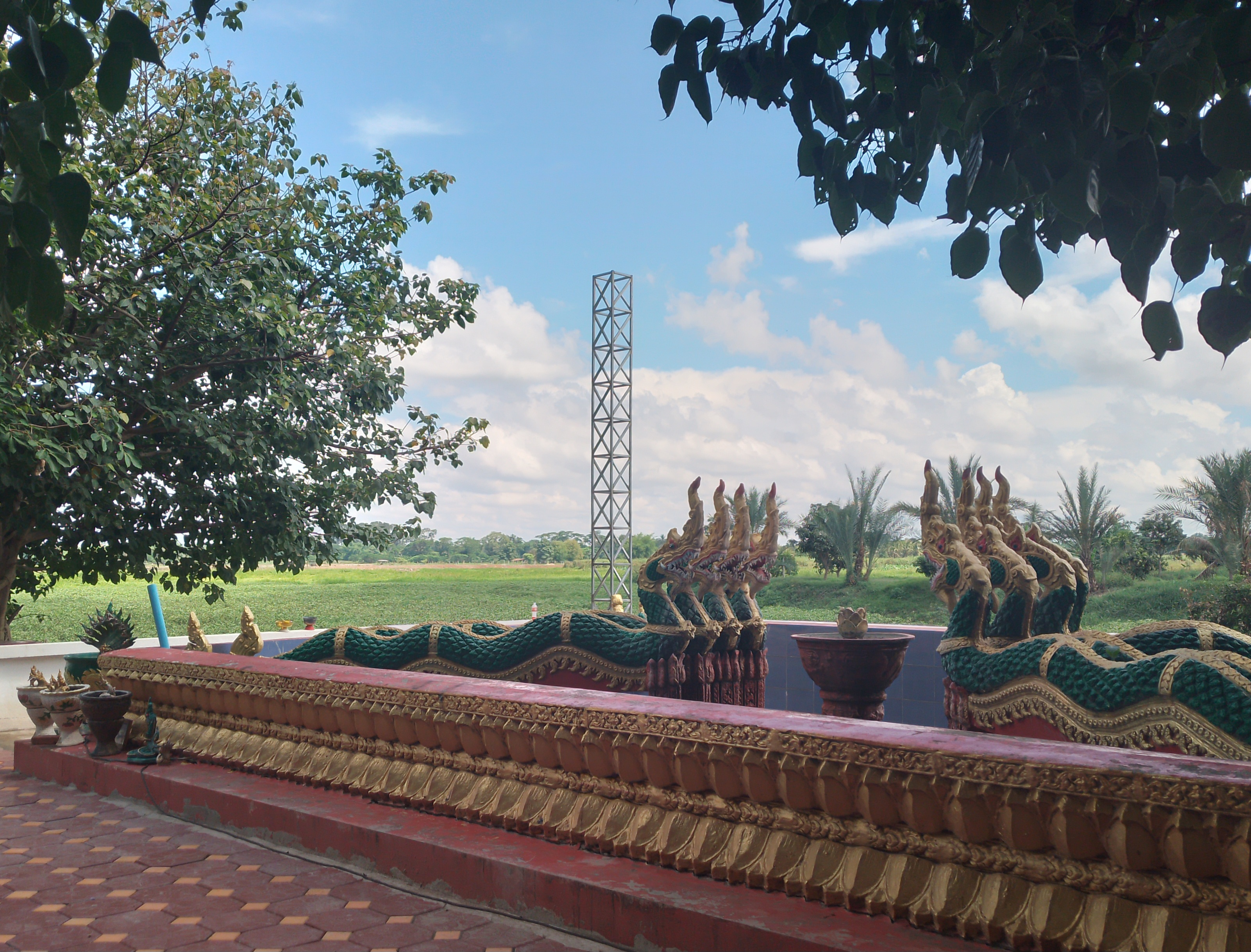
Wat Nong Kham Saen

Hadxayfong's history goes back to the Khmer Empire under King Jayavarman VII in the late 12th century, when it turned into an important settlement along Mekong trade routes. Archaeological finds including a statue and inscription discovered in 1902 and recorded by French explorer G. Maspero, points to its early important history.

In 1353, Chao Fa Ngum brought the area into the Lan Xang Kingdom, and it became a trading post. When King Setthathirath made Vientiane the kingdom's capital in 1560, a lot of temple construction followed, giving rise to temples like Wat Thong That and Wat Nong Kham Saen.

After Lan Xang Kingdom broke apart in the 18th century. Siamese forces invaded in 1779, and after Chao Anouvong's failed rebellion in 1827, most of Vientiane including the surrounding area was destroyed, leaving Hadxayfong as a quiet rural area for many years.
