= Huai Kon =

Village in Thailand

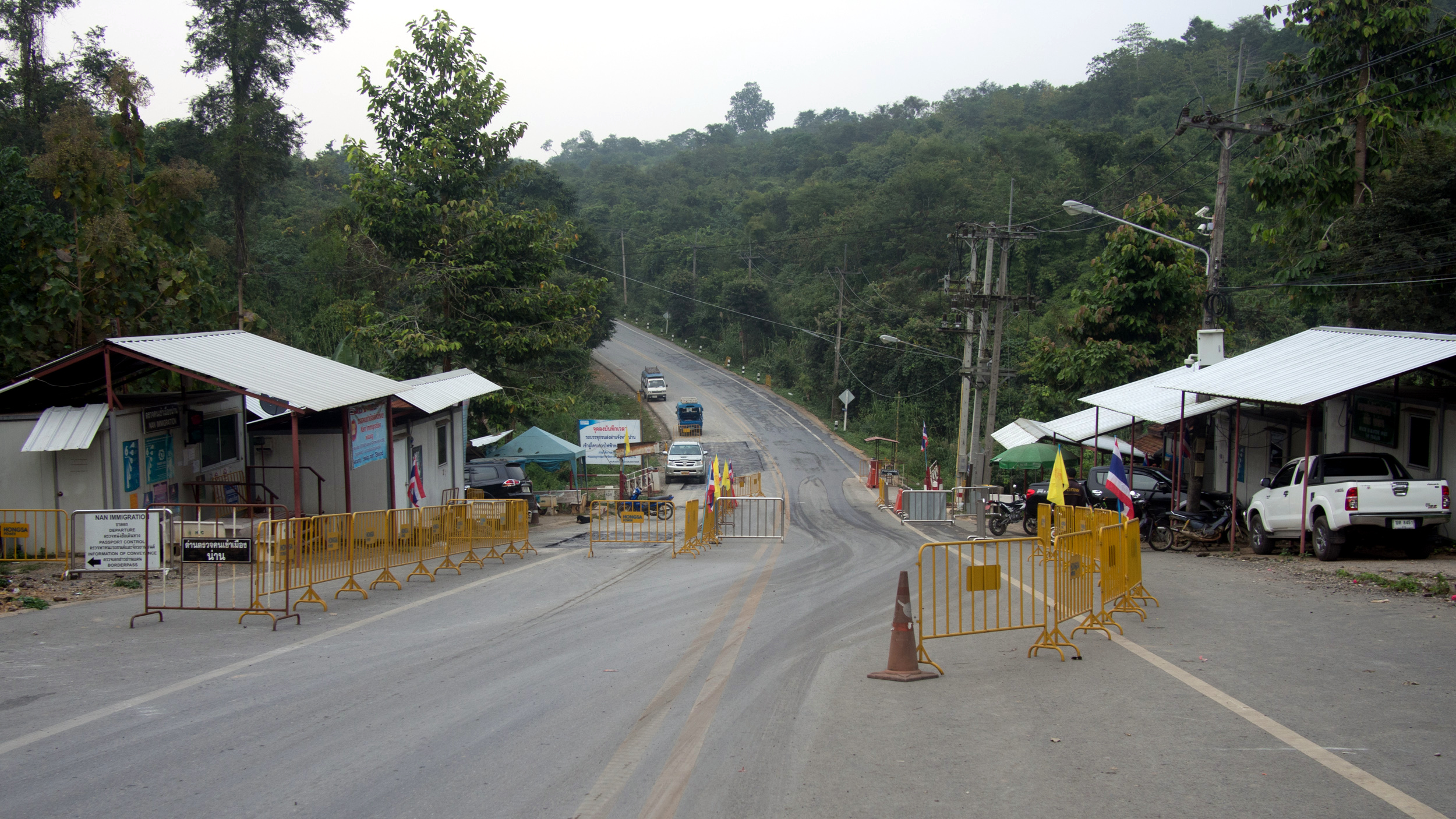
Huay Kon international crossing

Huay Kon (Thai: ห้วยโก๋น) is a Thai border village, the centre of the subdistrict (tambon) of the same name, 132 km (82 mi) north of Nan, in Chaloem Phra Kiat District, Nan across from Muang Ngeum, Laos.

== Surroundings ==
The crossing had been opened to traffic heading for Pak Beng and beyond along Laos Highway 4 (Muang Xai, etc.). A newly constructed road through steep mountains to Luang Prabang will cut 4 hours off the time between LP and Nan, Thailand beginning July 1, 2019 and serves as an alternative to overnight stay and transfer the next day to river boat from Pak Beng to LP. It seems this border does not allow motorbikes to cross.
