= National Route 9 (Vietnam) =

Road in Vietnam

National Route 9
- Quốc lộ 9

Route information
- Part of AH16
- Length: 90 km (56 mi)

Major junctions
- West end: Lao Bao Border Gate at Laotian border
- in Đông Hà in Tân Hợp
- East end: Cửa Việt Port

Location
- Country: Vietnam

Highway system
- Transport in Vietnam
← QL 8B	→ QL 10

National Route 9 (Vietnamese: Quốc lộ 9 (or abbrv. QL9) or Đường 9) runs across Vietnam roughly in line with the 17th Parallel. The route includes two segments. The segment called National Route 9A begins at Đông Hà and ends at Lao Bảo on the Vietnam-Laos border and is entirely within Quảng Trị Province. The 8 km-long segment called National Route 9B begins at Dong Ha and runs eastward to Cửa Việt Port.

== Road layout ==
Route 9 runs through the following towns and cities of Quảng Trị Province:

- Đông Hà, where it connects with Route 1
- Cam Lộ
- Ca Lu
- Tân Hợp, where it connects to the Ho Chi Minh Highway
- Khe Sanh
- Lang Vei
- Lao Bảo where it connects to Route 9E in Laos which runs through Xépôn and Seno to Savannakhet

== Specifications ==
- Total length: 82 km
- Road width: 10 m
- Road surface: paved with asphalt

== History ==
Route Coloniale 9 or RC9 was constructed by the French in the early 20th century. The road was built to connect the towns along the Mekong River in present-day Laos over the Annamite Range to the Vietnamese coast.

With the partition of Vietnam following the First Indochina War, Route 9 was the northernmost west–east road in South Vietnam and ran roughly parallel to the Vietnamese Demilitarized Zone.

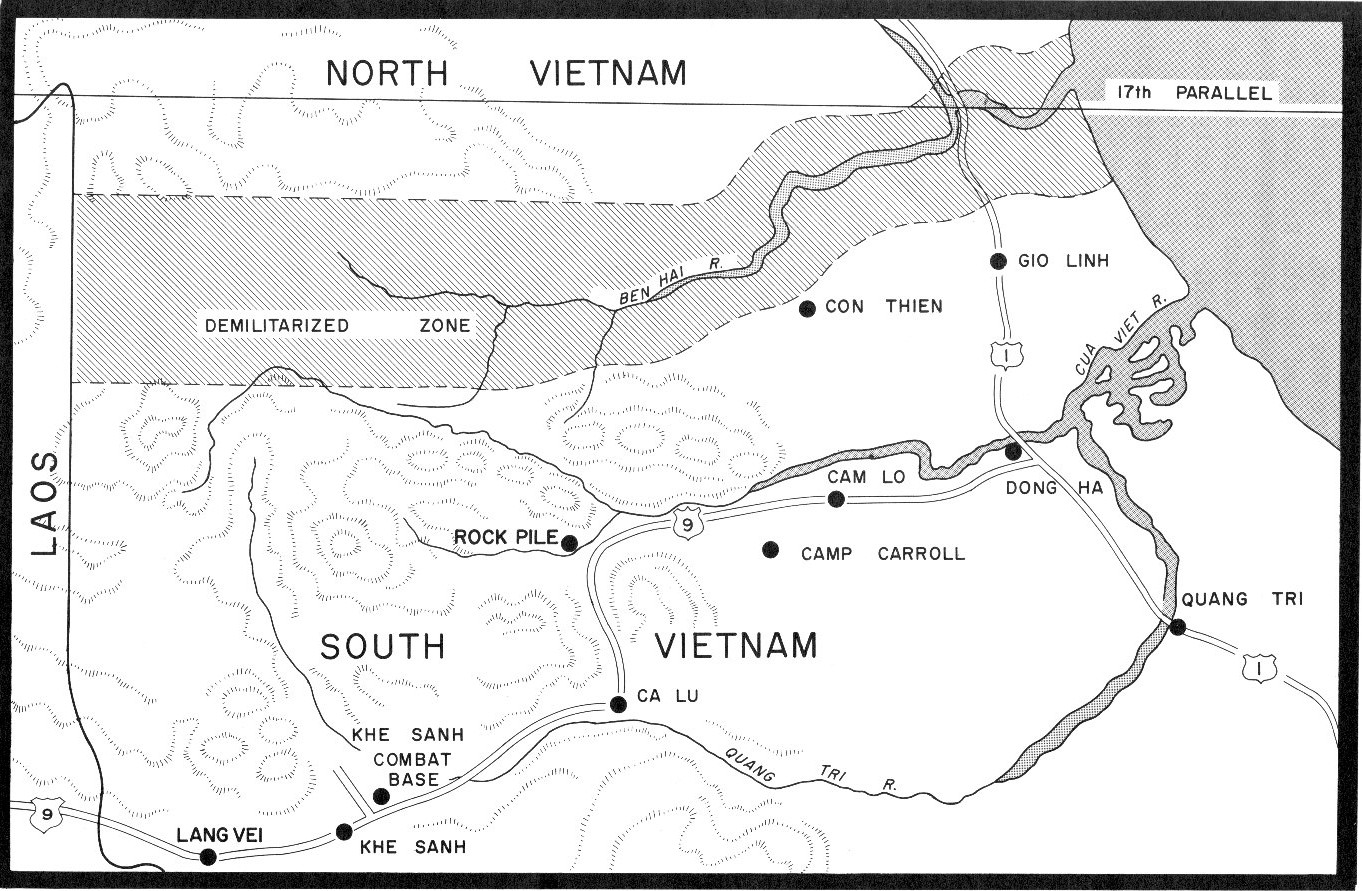
Map of the Demilitarized Zone

In the early 1960s as the Vietnam War began to increase in intensity, the Army of the Republic of Vietnam (ARVN) and US Special Forces began to build a chain of bases south of the DMZ to interdict the flow of men and materiel from North Vietnam. These bases included:

- Dong Ha
- Con Thien
- Camp Carroll
- The Rockpile
- Vandegrift Combat Base
- Ca Lu
- Khe Sanh
- Lang Vei

Route 9 became a vital supply artery to these bases and the North Vietnamese Army (NVA) were frequently able to cut or ambush Route 9 during the "Border Battles" period from 1967 to 1969. Route 9 was the access road used in Operation Pegasus and Operation Lam Son 719.

In recent years with the implementation of Vietnam's Doi Moi reforms there has been an increase in cross-border trade with Laos and Route 9 has been progressively upgraded. With the completion of the Ho Chi Minh Highway, Route 9 has become an important link between the Ho Chi Minh Highway and Route 1. As route AH16 in Asian Highway Network, the road continues westwards through Laos and across the Mekong into Thailand.

== Sources ==
- Vietnam Road Map Book (Tập Bản đồ Giao thông Đường bộ Việt Nam) revision 2004 by Vietnam Map Publishing House.
