= Mittraphap Road =

Road in Thailand

National Highway 2
- ทางหลวงแผ่นดินหมายเลข 2
- ถนนมิตรภาพ Thanon Mittraphap "Friendship Highway"

Route information
- Part of AH12
- Length: 509.113 km (316.348 mi)
- Existed: 1957–present

Major junctions
- Southwest end: Phahonyothin Rd., Mueang Saraburi, Saraburi
- Northeast end: Nong Khai, First Thai–Lao Friendship Bridge

Location
- Country: Thailand
- Provinces: Saraburi, Nakhon Ratchasima; Khon Kaen; Udon Thani, Nong Khai

Highway system
- Highways in Thailand; Motorways; Asian Highways

Mittraphap Road (Thai: ถนนมิตรภาพ, RTGS: Thanon Mittraphap, pronounced [tʰā.nǒn mít.trā.pʰâːp]; Northeastern Thai: ถนนมิตรภาพ, pronounced [tʰā.nǒn mìt.tā.pʰâːp]) or Highway 2 (Isan/Thai: ทางหลวงแผ่นดินหมายเลข 2, RTGS: Thang Luang Phaendin Mailek Song) is one of the four primary highways in Thailand, along with Phahonyothin Road (Highway 1), Sukhumvit Road (Highway 3), and Phetkasem Road (Highway 4). It runs from Saraburi to Nong Khai.

The road was originally built from Khorat to Nong Khai by the United States in 1955–1957 at a cost of US$20 million to supply its northeastern military bases.

It is the first highway in Thailand to meet international standards, and the first highway in Thailand to use both asphalt and concrete. It received the name "Thanon Mittraphap" on 20 February 1957. The name literally means "Friendship Road". It is the main road that connects Isan (northeastern Thailand) across the Dong Phaya Yen Range. The highway begins at Saraburi, Phahonyothin Road (Highway 1) junction. It passes through the provinces of Nakhon Ratchasima, Khon Kaen, Udon Thani, and ends in Nong Khai, where it links with the First Thai–Lao Friendship Bridge to Laos.

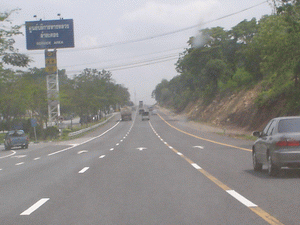
Six-lane expanded Mittraphap Road near Lam Takhong, Nakhon Ratchasima

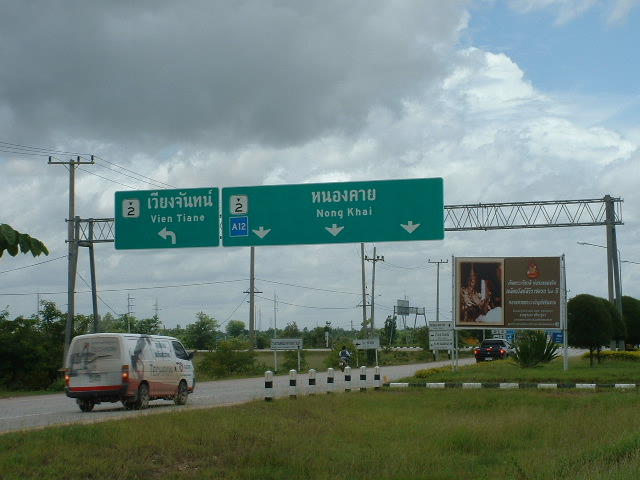
Mittraphap Highway in Nong Khai

Thai-Lao Friendship Bridge
