= AH12 =

Road in Asia

Asian Highway 12
- Map of AH12 in red
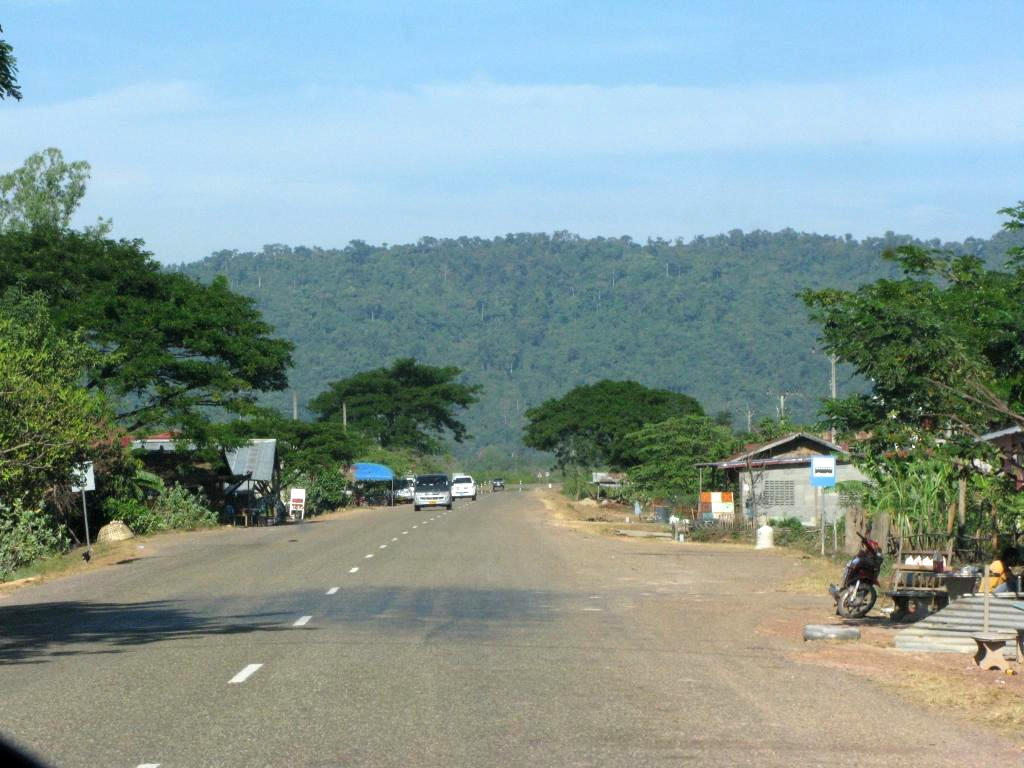
- AH12 in Laos

Route information
- Length: 1,195 km (743 mi)

Major junctions
- North end: Nateuy, Laos
- South end: Hin Kong, Thailand

Location
- Countries: Laos; Thailand

Highway system
- Asian Highway Network
← AH11	→ AH13

Asian Highway 12 (AH12) is a route of the Asian Highway Network, with a length of 1,195 km (747 miles) that runs from AH3 in Nateuy, Laos, through Muang Xay, Luang Prabang, Vang Vieng, Vientiane, Nong Khai, Udon Thani, Khon Kaen, Nakhon Ratchasima, and Saraburi until its terminus at AH1 in Nong Khae District, Saraburi Province, Thailand.

The highway has been in use since 8 April 1994. Its US$30 million cost was financed by Laos and Thailand, with the exception of the First Thai-Lao Friendship Bridge, funded by the Australian government as development aid for Laos.

== Sections ==
=== Laos ===
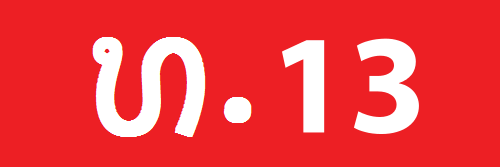
- Route 13: Nateuy–Vientiane
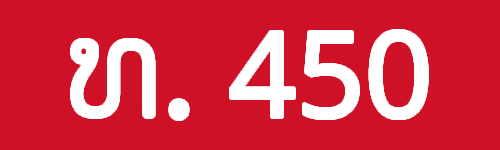
- Route 450: Vientiane–Thanaleng (Vientiane Prefecture), First Thai–Lao Friendship Bridge

=== Thailand ===
- Hwy 2 (Mittraphap Road): Nong Khai–Saraburi
- Hwy 1 (Phahonyothin Road): Saraburi–Hin Kong, Nong Khae District
