= Hồng Lĩnh =

Coordinates: 18.5305°N 105.7103°E

- District-level town (Class-4)
- Hồng Lĩnh Town; Thị xã Hồng Lĩnh
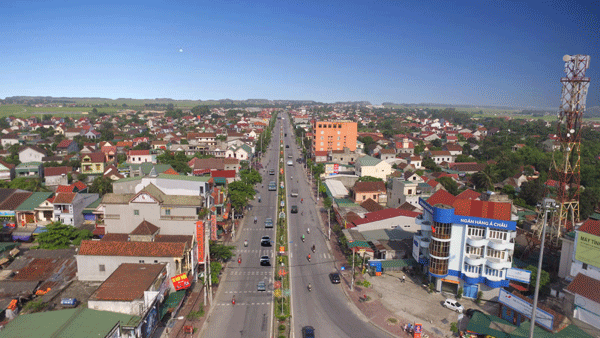
- Nickname: Blue River lighted-up Pink Mountain (Sông Lam rọi Núi Hồng)
- Interactive map of Hồng Lĩnh
- Location within Vietnam Location within Southeast Asia Location within Asia
- Country: Vietnam
- Region: North Central Coastal
- Province: Hà Tĩnh Province
- Established: 2 March 1992
- Capital: Hồng Lĩnh

Area
  - Total: 22.6 sq mi (58.5 km^{2})

Population (2009)
  - Total: 40,805
  - Density: 1,807/sq mi (697.5/km^{2})
- Time zone: UTC+7 (Indochina Time)

Hồng Lĩnh is a town in Hà Tĩnh Province in the North Central Coast region of Vietnam. It is near the Lam river and the 99 peaks of the Hồng Lĩnh mountains. As of 2003 the city had a population of 35,102. The district covers an area of 58 km^{2} (22 sq mi). The district capital lies at Hồng Lĩnh. Hồng Lĩnh town was scheduled for urban water supply in 2002 and given priority status for investment in 2005. In business directories the town is listed as "Hồng Lĩnh Town." The town is on the A1 Highway and subject to flooding.
