= Miss Universe Mongolia 2019 =

Mongolian beauty pageant

- Date: September 20, 2019
- Venue: Mongolia
- Entrants: 14
- Winner: Gunzaya Bat-Erdene

Miss Universe Mongolia 2019 is the 2nd edition of the Miss Universe Mongolia pageant that was held on September 20, 2019. The winner was Gunzaya Bat-Erdene, who was crowned by Miss Universe Mongolia 2018 Dolgion Delgarjav at the end of the event.

Bat-Erdene, aged 25, represented Mongolia at the Miss Universe 2019 beauty pageant on December 8, 2019, in Atlanta, Georgia, United States. She was one of 13 Miss Universe contestants who agreed to be photographed without makeup ahead of the pageant. However, she failed to penetrate a spot in the Top 20 at the event itself.
