= Olga Buława =

Miss Polski 2018

- Born: Olga Buława; July 29, 1991 (age 35); Świnoujście, Poland
- Education: SWPS University of Social Sciences and Humanities
- Height: 1.75 m (5 ft 9 in)
- Beauty pageant titleholder
- Title: Miss Polski 2018
- Eye color: Green
- Major competitions: Miss Polski 2018 (Winner); Miss Universe 2019 (Unplaced) (Miss Congeniality)

Olga Buława (born July 29, 1991) is a Polish former flight attendant and beauty pageant titleholder who won Miss Polski 2018, as Miss Polski, Buława previously represented Poland at Miss Universe 2019 competition and won the title of the Miss Universe Congeniality title.

== Personal life ==
Buława was born in Świnoujście and lived at Warsaw. She graduated at SWPS University of Social Sciences and Humanities obtaining a master's degree in law. She works as a flight attendant at LOT Polish Airlines for five years.

== Pageantry ==
=== Miss Polski 2018 ===
She competed at Miss Polski 2018 on December 9, 2018, at Krynica-Zdrój representing Świnoujście from the West Poland. She won and succeeded outgoing titleholder Kamila Świerc from Opole. Aside from the crown, She received PLN 50,000, jewelry from Jeweler Schubert, a collection from Tomaotomo and Viola Piekut, as well as annual care at the RosaMed clinic after her victory.

=== Miss Universe 2019 ===
She was later appointed as Miss Universe Poland 2019 after either the franchise from Miss Polonia was relinquished to Miss Polski or Milena Sadowska intended to represent Poland at the Miss World 2019 competition. As Miss Polski, she represented Poland at the Miss Universe 2019 pageant being the first Miss Polski titleholder to represent Poland at the Miss Universe competition, but failed to place; however, was able to grab a special award, Miss Congeniality.
