= Miss Polski 2018 =

29th Miss Polski pageant

- Date: December 9, 2018
- Presenters: Paulina Sykut-Jeżyna; Krzysztof Ibisz; Maciej Rock
- Entertainment: Margaret; Electric Girls; Mateusz Łopaciuk; Mateusz Ziółko; Filip Ziólko; Riya Sokół
- Venue: Municipal Sports and Recreation Center (MOSIR), Krynica-Zdrój
- Broadcaster: Polsat
- Entrants: 28
- Placements: 10
- Winner: Olga Buława; West Pomerania
- Photogenic: Angelika Hejnar (Subcarpathia)

Miss Polski 2018 was the 29th Miss Polski pageant, held on December 9, 2018. The winner was Olga Buława of West Pomerania and she represented Poland in Miss Universe 2019. 1st Runner-Up Karina Szczepanek represented Poland at Miss International 2019.

== Final results ==
Final results	Contestant
Miss Polski 2018; Miss Universe Poland 2019	West Pomerania – Olga Buława
1st Runner-Up; Miss International Poland 2019	Podlasie – Karina Szczepanek
2nd Runner-Up	Podlasie – Joanna Babynko
3rd Runner-Up	Lower Poland – Kinga Wawrzyniak
4th Runner-Up	Masovia – Marta Kaczmarczyk
Top 10	Holy Cross – Roksana Oraniec; Podlasie – Elwira Talkowska; Silesia – Luiza Szczerbowska; Subcarpathia – Angelika Hejnar; Subcarpathia – Klaudia Pustkowska

=== Special awards ===
Award	Contestant
Miss Internet	Silesia – Luiza Szczerbowska
Miss Photogenic	Subcarpathia – Angelika Hejnar
Miss Polsat Viewers	Podlasie – Joanna Babynko
Miss Virtual Poland	Podlasie – Joanna Babynko
Miss Social Media	Silesia – Dominika Mieczkowska

== Judges ==
- Kamila Świerc – Miss Polski 2017 from Opole
- Viola Piekut – Fashion Designer
- Tomasz Olejniczak – Fashion designer
- Renata Kaczoruk – Model
- Maria Niklińska – Actress
- Dominika Tajner-Wiśniewska – Manager of the Stars

== Finalists ==
Represents	Candidate	Age	Height	Title/Qualification Method
Holy Cross	Roksana Oraniec	22		Online Application
Kuyavia-Pomerania	Kinga Kołaczyńska	21		2nd Runner-Up of Miss Kuyavia-Pomerania 2018
Łódź	Justyna Flejsner	22		Miss Łódź 2018
Lower Poland	Kinga Wawrzyniak	22		Miss Lower Poland 2018
Lublin	Karolina Wojtiuk	19		1st Runner-Up of Miss Lublin 2018
Masovia	Aleksandra Nowacka	19		1st Runner-Up of Miss Radom Land 2018
Masovia	Karolina Soczewka	21		3rd Runner-Up of Miss Warsaw 2018
Masovia	Marta Kaczmarczyk	23		1st Runner-Up of Miss Warsaw 2018
Masovia	Paloma Żochowska	24		Miss Warsaw 2018
Masovia	Sylwia Gibała	21		Miss Radom Land 2018
Opole	Alexander Bodor	23	174 cm (5 ft 8.5 in)	Miss Opole 2018
Podlasie	Elwira Talkowska	26		Miss Lomza 2018
Podlasie	Joanna Babynko	22	178 cm (5 ft 10 in)	1st Runner-Up of Miss Podlasie 2018
Podlasie	Karina Szczepanek	23		2nd Runner-Up of Miss Podlasie 2018
Podlasie	Magdalena Wasiluk	22		Miss Podlasie 2018
Pomerania	Małgorzata Mazur	21		2nd Runner-Up of Miss Coast 2018
Pomerania	Weronika Bartkowska	19	178 cm (5 ft 10.5 in)	2nd Runner-Up of Miss Pomerania 2018
Silesia	Anna-Maria Jaromin	20		Miss Beskids 2018
Silesia	Dominika Mieczkowska	20		1st Runner-Up of Miss Silesia 2018
Silesia	Dominika Ociepa	23		Miss Silesia 2018
Silesia	Luiza Szczerbowska	23	171 cm (5 ft 7 in)	1st Runner-Up of Miss Beskids 2018
Silesia	Wiktoria Kędzierska	22		Online Application
Subcarpathia	Angelika Hejnar	21		Subcarpathia Green Card
Subcarpathia	Klaudia Pustkowska	22		Miss Subcarpathia 2018
Warmia-Masuria	Aleksandra Bogdan	20	170 cm (5 ft 7 in)	Miss Warmia and Masuria 2018
West Pomerania	Katarzyna Bukowiec	24	180 cm (5 ft 11 in)	Miss West Pomerania 2018
West Pomerania	Olga Buława	27	171 cm (5 ft 7 in)	2nd Runner-Up of Miss West Pomerania 2018
Polish Community in the U.K.	Aleksandra Kowalczyk	21		1st Runner-Up of Miss Polski UK & Ireland 2018

== Notes ==
=== Did not compete ===
- Lubusz
- Lower Silesia
- Upper Poland
- Polish Community in Argentina
- Polish Community in Australia
- Polish Community in Belarus
- Polish Community in Brazil
- Polish Community in Canada
- Polish Community in France
- Polish Community in Germany
- Polish Community in Ireland
- Polish Community in Israel
- Polish Community in Lithuania
- Polish Community in Russia
- Polish Community in South Africa
- Polish Community in Sweden
- Polish Community in the U.S.
- Polish Community in Venezuela
