= Rosie Zhu Xin =

Chinese model and beauty queen

Zhu Xin
- Born: February 26, 1993 (age 33); Shijiazhuang, Hebei, China
- Height: 1.76 m (5 ft 9 in)
- Beauty pageant titleholder
- Title: Miss Universe China 2019
- Hair color: Black
- Eye color: Brown
- Major competitions: Miss China World 2017 (finalist); Miss Intercontinental China 2018 (Top 10); Miss Universe China 2019 (Winner); Miss Universe 2019 (Unplaced)

Zhu Xin (Chinese: 朱鑫; born February 26, 1993), also known as Rosie Zhu Xin, is a Chinese model and beauty pageant titleholder who was crowned Miss Universe China 2019. She represented China at the Miss Universe 2019 pageant.

== Pageantry ==
=== Miss World China 2017 ===
Xin first competed in Miss China World 2017 and she was placed as a finalist.

=== Miss Intercontinental China 2018 ===
Officials of Miss Intercontinental China allowed Xin to participate in the Miss Intercontinental China 2018 pageant. She was placed as a Top 10 finalist.

=== Miss China 2019 ===
Xin represented Hebei at the Miss Universe China 2018 pageant held at Shenzhen and was crowned by her predecessor, Meisu Qin on January 14, 2019.

=== Miss Universe 2019 ===
Xin represented China at the Miss Universe 2019 pageant and failed to place.

Awards and achievements
Preceded by Meisu Qin	Miss Universe China; 2019	Succeeded by Jiaxin Sun
