= Christina Lasasimma =

Laotian beauty pageant titleholder

- ຄຣິສຕິນາ ລາຊາຊິມມາ
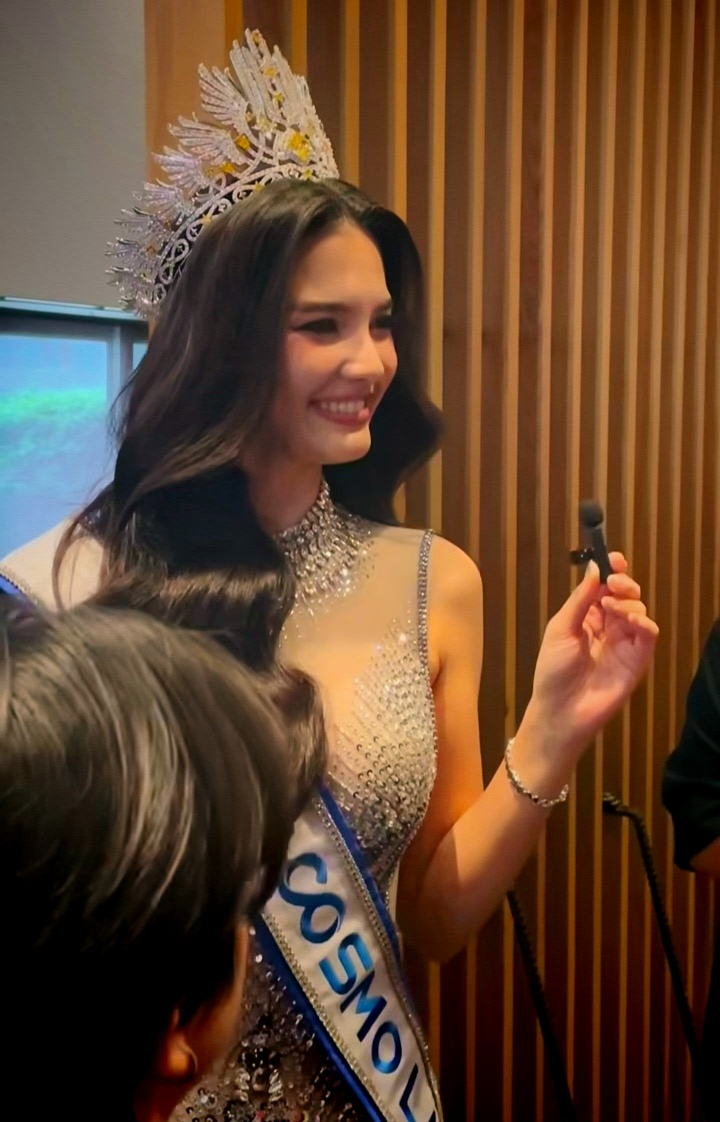
- Christina Lasasimma at the Miss Cosmo Laos event in 2025
- Born: Vientiane, Laos
- Education: National University of Laos
- Beauty pageant titleholder
- Title: Miss Laos 2012; Miss Universe Laos 2020; Miss Supranational Laos 2024; Miss Cosmo Laos 2025
- Major competitions: Miss Laos 2012; (Winner); Miss Universe Laos 2020; (Winner); Miss Universe 2020; (Unplaced); Miss Supranational Laos 2024; (Winner); Miss Supranational 2024; (Unplaced); Miss Cosmo 2025; (Top 21)

Christina Lasasimma (Lao: ຄຣິສຕິນາ ລາຊາຊິມມາ; born 27 June 1993) is a Laotian beauty pageant titleholder who won Miss Laos 2012 and Miss Universe Laos 2020. She represented Laos at the Miss Universe 2020. She also represented Laos at Miss Cosmo 2025 in Hanoi, Vietnam, where she placed in the Top 20. She is still actively involved in modeling.

== Career ==
=== Miss Laos 2012 ===
Lasasimma won Miss Laos in late 2012.

=== Miss Universe Laos 2020 ===
After eight years, she returned and won Miss Universe Laos in September 2020.

=== Miss Universe 2020 ===
As Miss Universe Laos 2020, she represented Laos at Miss Universe 2020 held in Florida, United States, where she was unplaced after the first round.

=== Miss Supranational 2024 ===
Lasasimma won Miss Supranational Laos held in October 2024, and participated in Miss Supranational 2024 held in Warsaw, Poland, where she was unplaced yet again.

=== Miss Cosmo 2025 ===
She was appointed as Miss Cosmo Laos 2025 and represented Laos at Miss Cosmo 2025, where she reached the top 20.

Awards and achievements
Preceded by Thidalat Vongsili	Miss Laos; 2012	Succeeded by Vilaylak Chanthavong
Preceded by Vichitta Phonevilay	Miss Universe Laos; 2020	Succeeded by Tonkham Phonchanhueang
Preceded by Narathip Siripaphanh	Miss Supranational Laos; 2024	Succeeded by Incumbent
Preceded by Soliya Bounsayngam	Miss Cosmo Laos; 2025	Succeeded by Incumbent
