= Miss Universe Laos 2023 =

6th edition of the Miss Universe Laos beauty pageant

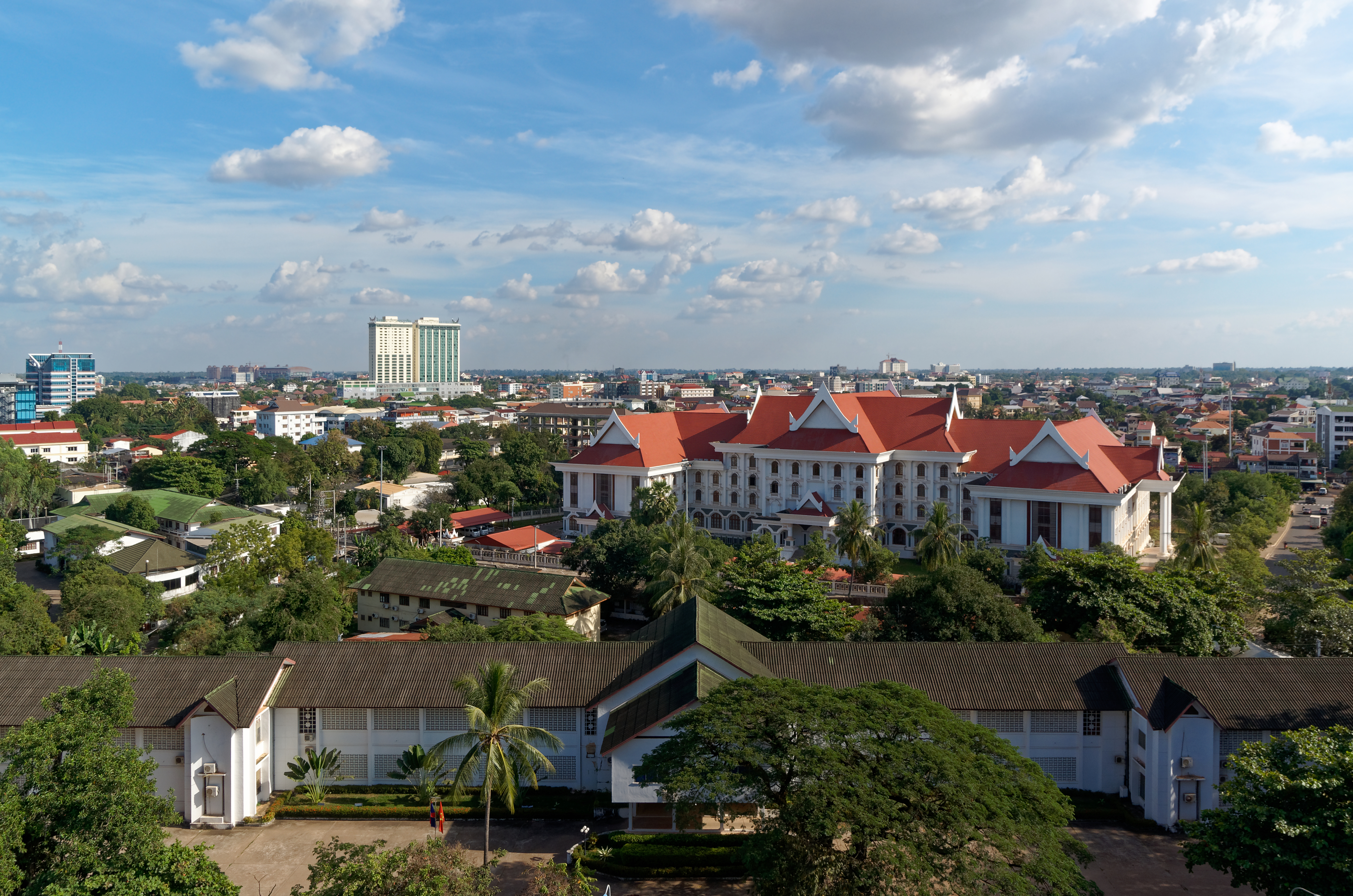
- Vientiane, the host city of the contest
- Date: July 23, 2023
- Venue: National Convention Hall, Vientiane
- Entrants: 15
- Placements: 9
- Debuts: Bokeo; Bolikhamsai; Champasak; Houaphanh; Khammouane; Luang Namtha; Luang Prabang; Oudomxay; Phongsaly; Sainyabuli; Salavan; Savannakhet; Vientiane Prefecture; Vientiane; Xiangkhouang
- Winner: Phaimany Lathsabanthao; Phongsaly

Miss Universe Laos 2023 was the seventh edition of the Miss Universe Laos beauty pageant, held on July 23, 2023 in Vientiane. Fifteen candidates, who have qualified for the national pageant through an online profile screening performed in March. crowned ”Phaimany Lathsabanthao” of Phongsaly as her successor at the end of the event. Phaimany will represent Laos in Miss Universe 2023, to be held in El Salvador in December.

Phaimany Lathsabanthao was crowned “Miss Universe” at the 72-Miss Universe 2023 pageant held in El Salvador. Papao is a model of Lao origin. She is Miss Universe Laos 2023 as a representative of Phongsaly. She symbolize the deadly combination of beauty with brains. Papao works to empower women in all areas through her project “Share to Shine”, Model trainer.

== Background ==
The applications for Miss Universe Laos 2023 was opened on March 19. All submitted applicants were then screened by the pageant organizer to determine the final 15 national candidates. Each qualified candidate was later assigned to represent one of the 15 country's provinces; the press conference was conducted on May 13. The swimsuit competition was held on 19 July 2023 whereas, the preliminary competition was held on 21 July 2023.

== Results ==
Color keys

- The contestant Won in an International pageant.
- The contestant was a Runner-up in an International pageant.
- The contestant was a Semi-Finalist in an International pageant.
- The contestant assumed another title.
- The contestant was not able to compete in an International pageant.
- The contestant did not place but won a Special Award in the pageant.
- The contestant did not place.

Final results	Contestant	International pageant	International Results
Miss Universe Laos 2023 (Winner)	Phongsaly - Phaimany Lathsabanthao	Miss Universe 2023	Unplaced
1st runner-up	Houaphanh - Phiranya Thipphomvong		
2nd runner-up	Bolikhamsai - Phavina Mounvongsa		
Top 6	Oudomxay – Deth Xaivanhsee (●)		
Top 6	Vientiane Prefecture – Vaniphone Phoumixay		
Top 6	Vientiane – Budseng Vongchanthum	Miss Global 2023	Unplaced
Top 9	Bokeo – Moukdavanh Many		
Top 9	Champasak – Latdavanh Phommala		
Top 9	Khammouane – Mariza Khampasouk		

(●): The candidate won the Miss People's Choice Award (online voting) and got direct entry into Top 9 Semifinalists.

== Candidates ==
Fifteen candidates competed for the title of Miss Universe Laos 2023.

Province	Candidate		Hometown	Age	Height
Province	Romanized name	Lao name	Hometown	Age	Height
Bokeo	Moukdavanh Many	ມຸກດາວັນ ມະນີ	Bokeo	23	1.68 m (5 ft 6 in)
Bolikhamsai	Phavina Mounvongsa	ພວິນາ ມອນວົງສາ		21	1.65 m (5 ft 5 in)
Champasak	Latdavanh Phommala	ລັດດາວັນ ພົມມາລາ	Champasak	28	1.65 m (5 ft 5 in)
Houaphanh	Phiranya Thipphomvong	ພິຣັນຍາ ທິບພົມວົງ	Houaphanh	27	1.65 m (5 ft 5 in)
Khammouane	Mariza Khomphasouk	ມາລິສາ ກົມພາສຸກ	Khammouane	21	1.65 m (5 ft 5 in)
Luang Namtha	Soutthida Chanthalangsy	ສຸທິດາ ຈັນທະລັງສີ		19	1.62 m (5 ft 4 in)
Luang Prabang	Dethiya Xomsihapanya	ເດທິຢາ ສົມສີຫາປັນຍາ	Vientiane Prefecture	24	1.75 m (5 ft 9 in)
Oudomxay	Deth Xaivanhsee	ເດດ ໄຊວັນສີ	Oudomxay	19	1.60 m (5 ft 3 in)
Phongsaly	Phaimany Lathsabanthao	ໄພມະນີ ລາດສະບັນເທົາ	Vientiane	28	1.75 m (5 ft 9 in)
Sainyabuli	Angie Prasert	ແອນຈີ້ ປະເສີດ	Sainyabuli	20	1.62 m (5 ft 4 in)
Salavan	Koutkeo Latthasombath	ກູດແກ້ວ ລັດຖະສົມບັດ	Salavan	27	1.68 m (5 ft 6 in)
Savannakhet	Bounmy Phoutsibout	ບຸນມີ ພຸດສີບຸດ	Vientiane Prefecture	21	1.65 m (5 ft 5 in)
Vientiane	Budseng Vongchanthum	ບັດແສງ ວົງຈັນທຳ	Vientiane	20	1.75 m (5 ft 9 in)
Vientiane Prefecture	Vaniphone Phoumixay	ວານີພອນ ພູມີໄຊ	Vientiane	28	1.70 m (5 ft 7 in)
Xiangkhouang	Paphatsone Manyvong	ປາພັດສອນ ມະນີວົງ	Vientiane	19	1.70 m (5 ft 7 in)
