= Miss Universe 2019 =

68th edition of the Miss Universe competition

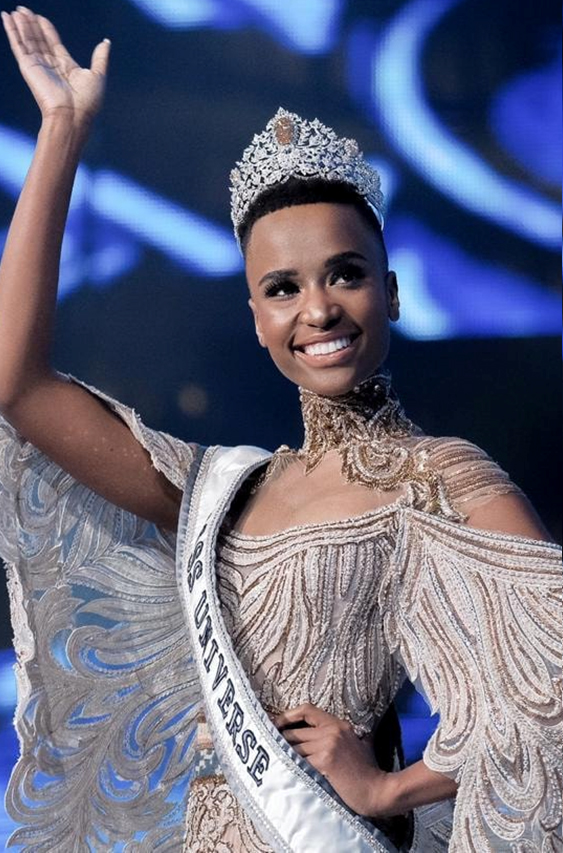
- Zozibini Tunzi
- Date: 8 December 2019
- Presenters: Steve Harvey; Olivia Culpo; Vanessa Lachey
- Entertainment: Ally Brooke
- Venue: Tyler Perry Studios, Atlanta, Georgia, United States
- Broadcaster: Fox; Telemundo
- Entrants: 90
- Placements: 20
- Debuts: Bangladesh; Equatorial Guinea
- Withdrawals: Ghana; Greece; Guatemala; Hungary; Kyrgyzstan; Lebanon; Russia; Sri Lanka; Switzerland; Zambia
- Returns: Lithuania; Romania; Sierra Leone; Tanzania
- Winner: Zozibini Tunzi; South Africa
- Congeniality: Olga Buława, Poland
- Best National Costume: Gazini Ganados, Philippines

Miss Universe 2019 was the 68th Miss Universe pageant, held at Stage 1 of Tyler Perry Studios in Atlanta, Georgia, United States, on 8 December 2019.

At the end of the event, Zozibini Tunzi of South Africa was crowned as Miss Universe 2019 by Catriona Gray of the Philippines. It was South Africa's third win after 1978 and their recent victory in 2017. This edition also saw the crowning of the first black woman from the country to win and the first since Leila Lopes of Angola in 2011.

Contestants from ninety countries and territories participated in this year's pageant. The pageant was hosted by Steve Harvey for the fifth consecutive year, with Miss Universe 2012 Olivia Culpo and Vanessa Lachey as backstage correspondents. Ally Brooke performed in this year's pageant.

The competition also featured the debut of the new Mouawad Power of Unity crown, crafted in 18-karat gold and 1,770 diamonds, including a shield-cut golden canary diamond at the center weighing at 62.83 carats. The crown is said to be worth $5 million.

== Background ==
=== Location and date ===
In December 2018, Filipino politician and businessman Chavit Singson of the LCS Group of Companies, who financed Miss Universe 2016, stated that the 2019 edition of the pageant would be in Seoul, South Korea, which previously hosted Miss Universe 1980. He added that he would assist in preparations for the competition in South Korea, although the details were not finalized; the Miss Universe Organization had never confirmed this.

Later, in April 2019, it was reported that both the Philippines and Rio de Janeiro, Brazil were interested in hosting the competition. Interest in the Philippines grew following the win of Filipina Catriona Gray in Miss Universe 2018, looking to crown her successor in her home country, as Pia Wurtzbach did at Miss Universe 2016. Meanwhile, Rio de Janeiro will be declared the World Capital of Architecture by UNESCO for 2020, and was looking to host more international events in the city in anticipation of this title. In August 2019, Israel was also reportedly interested in hosting the competition. With a plan created by producers Danny Benaim and Assaf Blecher, talks regarding hosting the competition in Israel emerged after Tel Aviv successfully hosted the Eurovision Song Contest 2019. They stated that Israel was also interested in hosting the pageant on next two years. The country later hosted Miss Universe 2021 in Eilat.

In May 2019, Richelle Singson-Michael, the daughter of Chavit Singson, stated that the Philippines was one of several countries bidding to host the 2019 competition, and that her family's business LCS Group was committed to hosting either in the Philippines or in South Korea.

On 31 October 2019, the Miss Universe Organization confirmed that the competition would be at Tyler Perry Studios in Atlanta, Georgia on 8 December 2019.

=== Selection of participants ===
Contestants from ninety countries and territories were selected to compete in the pageant. Six of these delegates were appointees to their national titles and another was selected after another national pageant was held to replace the original dethroned winner.

==== Replacements ====
Angeline Flor Pua, Miss Belgium 2018, was appointed to represent Belgium after Elena Castro Suarez, Miss Belgium 2019, chose to compete at Miss World 2019. Maëva Coucke, Miss France 2018, was appointed to the title by the Miss France organization after Vaimalama Chaves, Miss France 2019, opted not to compete in an international pageant. Vartika Singh of India, who previously represented India at Miss Grand International 2015, was appointed to represent India by the Miss Diva organization. Olga Buława, Miss Polski 2018 was selected to represent Poland by the Miss Polski organization after the Miss Polonia organization relinquished the franchise. Fiona Tenuta of Uruguay was appointed by Osmel Sousa, the national director of Miss Universe Uruguay, through a casting process after they could not find enough sponsors to hold an actual competition. Hoàng Thị Thùy, the first runner-up at the Miss Universe Vietnam 2017 pageant, was appointed to represent Vietnam following an internal selection by Dương Trương Thiên Lý, the country's national director.

Anyella Grados originally was to represent Peru at Miss Universe, but was dethroned following a scandal where videos of her surfaced showing being severely drunk and vomiting in public. Due to the dethronement of Grados, a special edition of Miss Perú 2019 took place to select the new representative. Kelin Rivera was the winner.

==== Debuts, returns and withdrawals ====
This edition marked the debuts of Bangladesh and Equatorial Guinea, and the returns of Lithuania, Romania, Sierra Leone and Tanzania. Lithuania last competed in 2014, Sierra Leone in 2016, and the others in 2017. Ghana, Greece, Guatemala, Hungary, Kyrgyzstan, Lebanon, Russia, Sri Lanka, Switzerland and Zambia withdrew. Before the pageant, the Miss Universe Ghana organization was suspended temporarily and resumed operations in 2020. Erika Kolani of Greece was unable to compete for undisclosed reasons. Lebanon withdrew from the competition after the Miss Lebanon 2019 competition was continuously postponed and ultimately canceled due to the 2019–20 Lebanese protests. Alina Sanko, Miss Russia 2019, was originally going to be sent to both Miss Universe and Miss World 2019, but was unable to do so due to overlapping dates. The Miss Russia organization was unable to finalize replacement plans for Miss Universe due to the length of time it took for the Miss Universe Organization to publish details about its date and venue, making it difficult for the Russian entrant to receive an American visa. However, Sanko did compete in Miss Universe 2020. Zambia withdrew from the competition after Didia Mukwala, Miss Universe Zambia 2019, and the Miss Universe Zambia organization failed to book Mukwala's trip to Atlanta due to their organization's financial situation.

Swe Zin Htet of Myanmar became the first openly lesbian to compete in Miss Universe after coming out days before finals night.

== Results ==
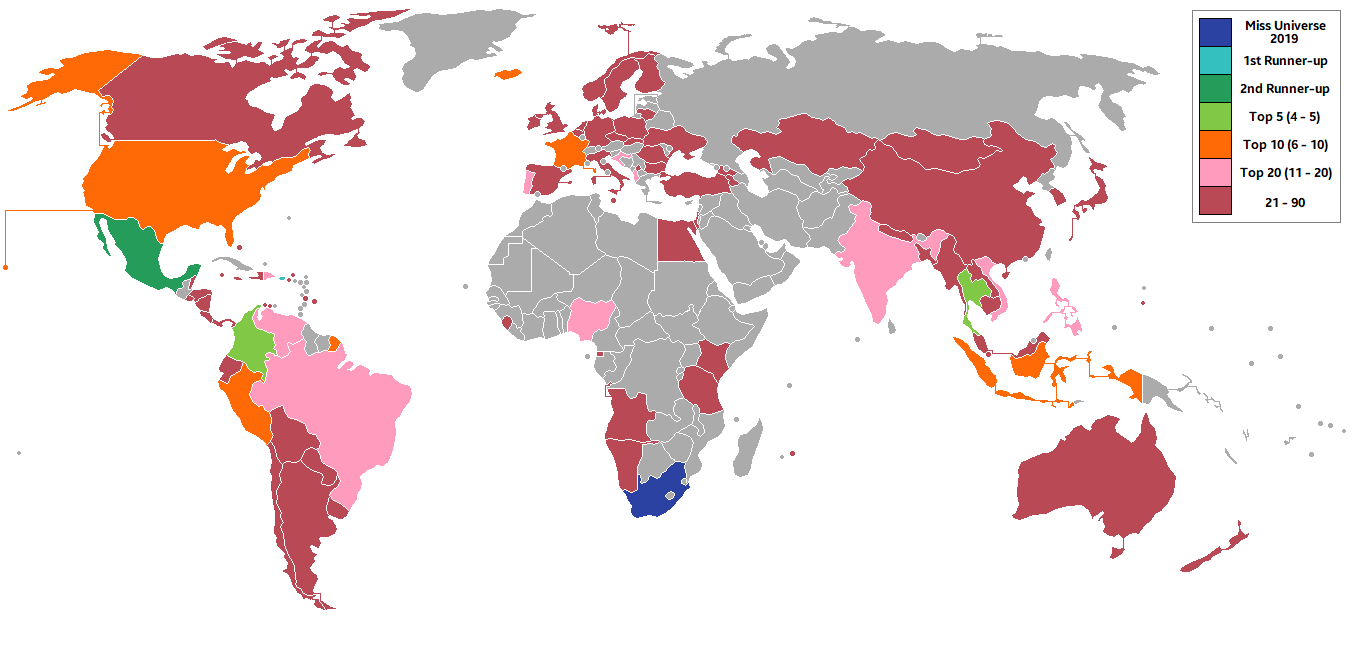
Miss Universe 2019 participating countries and territories

=== Placements ===
Placement	Contestant
Miss Universe 2019	South Africa – Zozibini Tunzi
1st Runner-Up	Puerto Rico – Madison Anderson
2nd Runner-Up	Mexico – Sofía Aragón
Top 5	Colombia – Gabriela Tafur; Thailand – Paweensuda Drouin
Top 10	France – Maëva Coucke; Iceland – Birta Þórhallsdóttir; Indonesia – Frederika Cull; Peru – Kelín Rivera; United States – Cheslie Kryst
Top 20	Albania – Cindy Marina; Brazil – Júlia Horta; Croatia – Mia Rkman; Dominican Republic – Clauvid Dály; India – Vartika Singh; Nigeria – Olutosin Araromi; Philippines – Gazini Ganados; Portugal – Sylvie Silva; Venezuela – Thalía Olvino; Vietnam – Thùy Hoàng

=== Special awards ===
Award	Contestant
Best National Costume	Philippines – Gazini Ganados
Miss Congeniality	Poland – Olga Buława

== Pageant ==
=== Format ===
Same with 2018, twenty semi-finalists were chosen through the preliminary competition— composed of the swimsuit and evening gown competitions and closed-door interviews. After a two-year absence, Internet voting returned, with the public being able to vote a candidate into the top twenty through online voting. The continental format returned for the third year, with five semifinalists from the Americas, Europe, Africa & Asia-Pacific, and wildcards coming from any continental region. The twenty semi-finalists competed in the opening statement round, introduced in 2018, featuring each semifinalist giving a short introduction to themselves and their platforms. Afterward, ten semi-finalists advanced to compete in the swimsuit and evening gown rounds. From ten, five finalists were chosen to compete in the first question and answer round, while three finalists were chosen to compete in the final word. The three finalists also gave their closing statements before the coronation. It is the first time the closing statement round was used, replacing the final walk portion.

=== Selection committee ===
- Gaby Espino – Venezuelan actress
- Sazan Hendrix – American businesswoman and social media personality
- Riyo Mori – Miss Universe 2007 from Japan
- Cara Mund – Miss America 2018 from North Dakota
- Bozoma Saint John – American businesswoman and marketing executive
- Crystle Stewart – Miss USA 2008 from Texas
- Paulina Vega – Miss Universe 2014 from Colombia
- Olivia Jordan – Miss USA 2015 from Oklahoma (only as preliminary judge)

== Contestants ==
Ninety contestants competed for the title.

Country/Territory	Contestant	Age (Note: Age at time of pageant)	Hometown	Continental Group
Albania	Cindy Marina	21	Shkodër	Europe
Angola	Salett Miguel	20	Cuanza	Africa & Asia-Pacific
Argentina	Mariana Varela	23	Avellaneda	Americas
Armenia	Dayana Davtyan	21	Yerevan	Europe
Aruba	Danna García	21	Oranjestad	Americas
Australia	Priya Serrao	27	Melbourne	Africa & Asia-Pacific
(The Bahamas) Bahamas	Tarea Sturrup	24	Grand Bahama	Americas
Bangladesh	Shirin Akter Shela	20	Thakurgaon	Africa & Asia-Pacific
Barbados	Shanel Ifill	20	Bridgetown	Americas
Belgium	Angeline Flor Pua	24	Antwerp	Europe
Belize	Destinee Arnold	26	Roaring Creek	Americas
Bolivia	Fabiana Hurtado	21	Santa Cruz	Americas
Brazil	Júlia Horta	25	Juiz de Fora	Americas
British Virgin Islands	Bria Smith	26	Tortola	Americas
Bulgaria	Lora Asenova	25	Byala Slatina	Europe
Cambodia	Somnang Alyna	18	Phnom Penh	Africa & Asia-Pacific
Canada	Alyssa Boston	24	Tecumseh	Americas
Cayman Islands	Kadejah Bodden	23	Bodden Town	Americas
Chile	Geraldine González	20	Conchali	Americas
China	Rosie Zhu Xin	26	Hebei	Africa & Asia-Pacific
Colombia	Gabriela Tafur	24	Cali	Americas
Costa Rica	Paola Chacón	28	San José	Americas
Croatia	Mia Rkman	22	Korčula	Europe
Curaçao	Kyrsha Attaf	22	Willemstad	Americas
Czech Republic	Barbora Hodačová	24	Teplice	Europe
Denmark	Katja Stokholm	23	Odense	Europe
Dominican Republic	Clauvid Dály	18	Punta Cana	Americas
Ecuador	Cristina Hidalgo	22	Guayaquil	Americas
Egypt	Diana Hamed	20	Cairo	Africa & Asia-Pacific
El Salvador	Zuleika Soler	25	La Unión	Americas
Equatorial Guinea	Serafina Eyene	20	Niefang	Africa & Asia-Pacific
Finland	Anni Harjunpää	23	Sastamala	Europe
France	Maëva Coucke	25	Fougères	Europe
(Georgia (country)) Georgia	Tako Adamia	25	Tbilisi	Europe
Germany	Miriam Rautert	23	Berlin	Europe
(United Kingdom) Great Britain	Emma Jenkins	27	Llanelli	Europe
Guam	Sissie Luo	18	Tamuning	Africa & Asia-Pacific
Haiti	Gabriela Vallejo	26	Pétion-Ville	Americas
Honduras	Rosemary Arauz	26	San Pedro Sula	Americas
Iceland	Birta Þórhallsdóttir	20	Mosfellsbær	Europe
India	Vartika Singh	26	Lucknow	Africa & Asia-Pacific
Indonesia	Frederika Cull	20	Jakarta	Africa & Asia-Pacific
(Republic of Ireland) Ireland	Fionnghuala O'Reilly	26	Dublin	Europe
Israel	Sella Sharlin	23	Beit	Africa & Asia-Pacific
Italy	Sofia Trimarco	20	Buccino	Europe
Jamaica	Iana Tickle Garcia	19	Montego Bay	Americas
Japan	Ako Kamo	22	Kobe	Africa & Asia-Pacific
Kazakhstan	Alfïya Ersayın	18	Atyrau	Europe
Kenya	Stacy Michuki	18	Nairobi	Africa & Asia-Pacific
Kosovo	Fatbardha Hoxha	21	Rečane	Europe
Laos	Vichitta Phonevilay	23	Vientiane	Africa & Asia-Pacific
Lithuania	Paulita Baltrušaitytė	21	Vilnius	Europe
Malaysia	Shweta Sekhon	22	Kuala Lumpur	Africa & Asia-Pacific
Malta	Teresa Ruglio	23	Sliema	Europe
Mauritius	Ornella LaFleche	21	Beau Bassin-Rose Hill	Africa & Asia-Pacific
Mexico	Sofía Aragón	25	Guadalajara	Americas
Mongolia	Gunzaya Bat-Erdene	25	Ulaanbaatar	Africa & Asia-Pacific
Myanmar	Swe Zin Htet	20	Hpa-an	Africa & Asia-Pacific
Namibia	Nadja Breytenbach	24	Windhoek	Africa & Asia-Pacific
Nepal	Pradeepta Adhikari	23	Kathmandu	Africa & Asia-Pacific
Netherlands	Sharon Pieksma	24	Rotterdam	Europe
New Zealand	Diamond Langi	27	Auckland	Africa & Asia-Pacific
Nicaragua	Inés López	19	Managua	Americas
Nigeria	Olutosin Araromi	26	Jalingo	Africa & Asia-Pacific
Norway	Helene Abildsnes	21	Kristiansand	Europe
Panama	Mehr Eliezer	22	Panama City	Americas
Paraguay	Ketlin Lottermann	26	Santa Rita	Americas
Peru	Kelín Rivera	26	Arequipa	Americas
Philippines	Gazini Ganados	23	Talisay	Africa & Asia-Pacific
Poland	Olga Buława	28	Świnoujście	Europe
Portugal	Sylvie Silva	20	Guimarães	Europe
Puerto Rico	Madison Anderson	24	Toa Baja	Americas
Romania	Dorina Chihaia	26	Iași	Europe
Saint Lucia	Bebiana Mangal	23	Castries	Americas
Sierra Leone	Marie Esther Bangura	22	Port Loko	Africa & Asia-Pacific
Singapore	Mohana Prabha	24	Singapore	Africa & Asia-Pacific
Slovakia	Laura Longauerová	24	Detva	Europe
South Africa	Zozibini Tunzi	26	Tsolo	Africa & Asia-Pacific
South Korea	Lee Yeon-joo	25	Incheon	Africa & Asia-Pacific
Spain	Natalie Ortega	20	Barcelona	Europe
Sweden	Lina Ljungberg	22	Östergötland	Europe
Tanzania	Shubila Stanton	23	Morogoro	Africa & Asia-Pacific
Thailand	Paweensuda Drouin	26	Bangkok	Africa & Asia-Pacific
Turkey	Bilgi Aydoğmuş	23	Istanbul	Europe
Ukraine	Anastasia Subbota	26	Zaporizhia	Europe
United States	Cheslie Kryst	28	Charlotte	Americas
United States Virgin Islands	Andrea Piecuch	28	Charlotte Amalie	Americas
Uruguay	Fiona Tenuta	21	Punta del Este	Americas
Venezuela	Thalía Olvino	20	Valencia	Americas
Vietnam	Thùy Hoàng	27	Thanh Hóa	Africa & Asia-Pacific
