= Payengxa Lor =

Laotian beauty pageant titleholder

- ນາງ ປ່າເຢັ້ງຊາ ລໍ່
- Beauty pageant titleholder
- Title: Miss Universe Laos 2022
- Major competitions: Miss Universe Laos 2022; (Winner); Miss Universe 2022; (Top 16)

Payengxa Lor (RPA: Paj Yeeb Xa Lauj, Lao: ນາງ ປ່າເຢັ້ງຊາ ລໍ່; Pahawh: 𖬖𖬰𖬪𖬵 𖬀𖬶𖬤 𖬗𖬰𖬮 𖬄𖬶𖬞); is a Laotian beauty pageant titleholder who was crowned Miss Universe Laos 2022. Lor represented Laos at the Miss Universe 2022 held in New Orleans, in the United States and placed in the top 16.

== Pageantry ==
=== Miss Universe Laos 2022 ===
On October 8, 2022, Lor competed against 19 other candidates at Miss Universe Laos 2022 at the Mekong Riverside Hotel in Vientiane, winning the title and Miss Perfect Skin by Renita Beauty Center, Miss Confident Smile by 4U Spa Dental and Scent of Beauty by Madame Fin awards. She is the first Hmong/Laotian to compete at Miss Universe.

=== Miss Universe 2022 ===
On January 14, 2023, Lor represented Laos at Miss Universe 2022 at the Ernest N. Morial Convention Center in New Orleans, Louisiana, US. In the final event, she won the fan vote and reached the top 16. And she became the very first Laotian to enter the semifinals, in the history of the Miss Universe pageant.

Awards and achievements
Preceded by Tonkham Phonchanhueang	Miss Universe Laos; 2022	Succeeded by Phaimany Lathsabanthao
Preceded by (Vietnam) Nguyễn Huỳnh Kim Duyên	Fan Vote Winner; Miss Universe; 2022	Succeeded by (Philippines) Michelle Dee
