= Tonkham Phonchanheuang =

Laotian beauty pageant titleholder

Jennie Tonkham Phonchanheuang
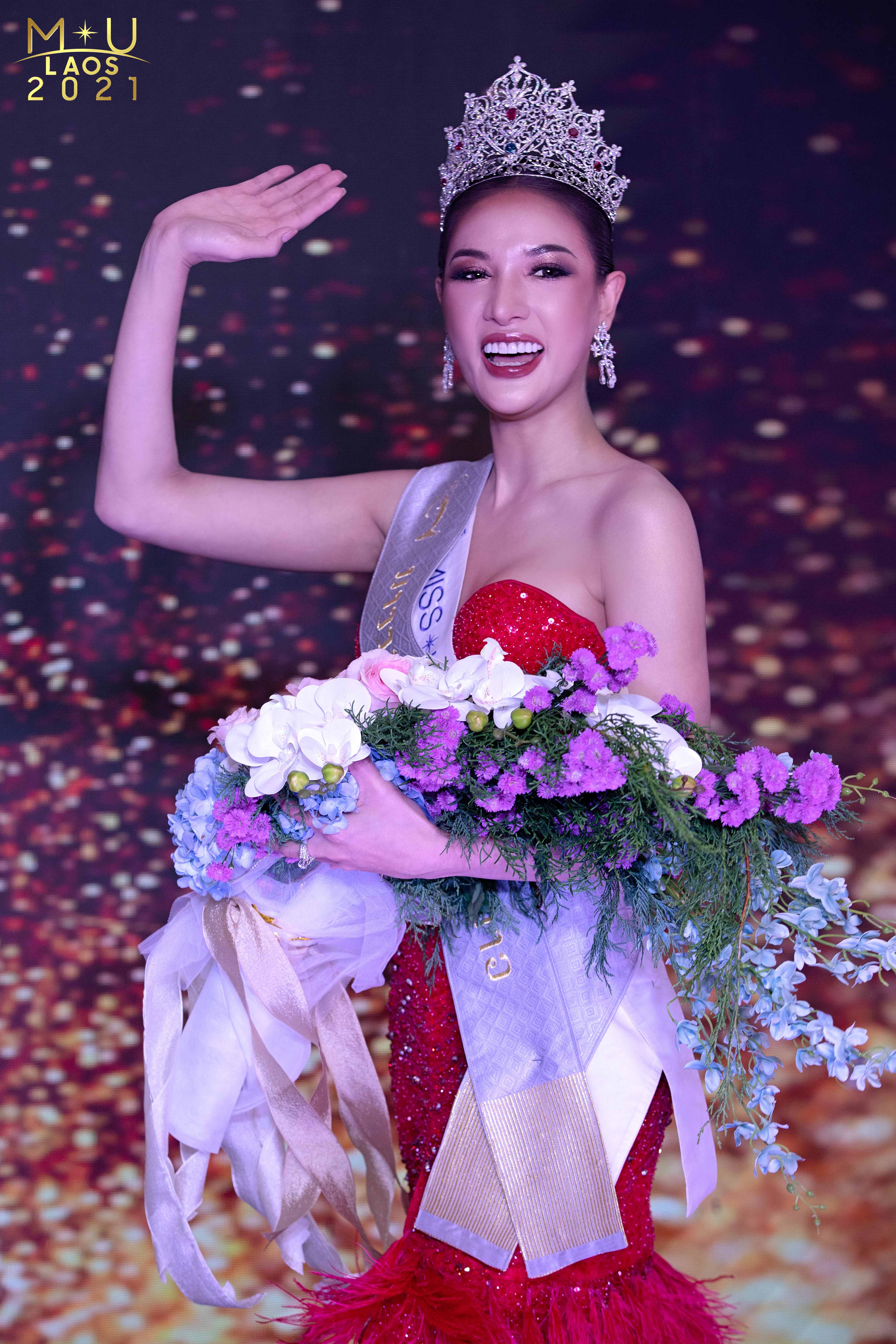
- Born: Vientiane, Laos
- Beauty pageant titleholder
- Title: Miss Universe Laos 2021
- Major competition: Miss Universe Laos 2021 (winner)

Jennie Tonkham Phonchanheuang (Lao language:ຕົ້ນຄຳ ພົນຈັນເຮືອງ) is a Laotian beauty pageant titleholder who won Miss Universe Laos 2021.

== Pageantry ==
=== Miss Universe Laos 2021 ===
On 31 October 2021, Phonchanhueang won Miss Universe Laos 2021. She was crowned by outgoing titleholder Christina Lasasimma.

Awards and achievements
Preceded by None	Miss World Laos; 2017	Succeeded by Kadoumphet Xaiyavong
Preceded by Christina Lasasimma	Miss Universe Laos; 2021	Succeeded by Payengxa Lor
