= Laos at beauty pageants =

Beauty pageant placement

Laotian beauty pageants
- Formation: 2017; 9 years ago
- Type: Beauty pageant
- Headquarters: Vientiane
- Location: Laos
- Members: Miss Universe; Miss World; Miss International; Miss Earth; Miss Supranational; Miss Grand International
- Official language: Lao

This is a list of Laos representatives at major international beauty pageants: Miss Universe, Miss World, Miss International, Miss Earth. And other international beauty pageants such as Miss Supranational, Miss Grand International and Miss Intercontinental.

== Miss Laos ==
=== Miss Laos ===
Year	Miss Laos	Runners Up				Venue	Number
Year	Miss Laos	First	Second	Third	Fourth	Venue	Number
2023	Daophahat Keosomephan	Alinya Reungthavong	Mithuna Ruangbunma	Thithprasone Khunvong	Sonya Simmanotham	National Convention Hall	30
2022	Moukthida Sirivong	Viengsavan Sutannuvong	Aadawan Panthawang	Pomani Vongxay	Onpiya Phouamnouy	Vientiane Center Lao	30
2021	Thidachanh Visisombath	Kuang Kanlaya	Mekhala Chalernxay	Savanphone Kanhaxai	Phirning Phum-Mi	Landmark Mekong Riverside Hotel	20
2020	Bounphasone Boutdara	Phonthida Kebounpan	Pim-Masone Vorasakmasone Vorasak	Laddawan Shaimalo	Phonthawi Philawong	ITECC Mall	40
2019	Vinada Phisalard	Joanne Phothivat	Soutdavone Patsaphan	Porsani Rattanasak	Buddhao Chanthalee	ITECC Mall	40
2018	Soutthida Anousinh	Khingkham Nitsavan	Kaewmukda Pimpakdee	Manida Nenhouangmala	Maytiny Luangpaserth	ITECC Mall	40
2017	Duangphathai Meksithong	Chanprasher Patiphan	Viraphon Kakeo	Sunawon Inthawong	Khemphet Anurak	ITECC Mall	20
2016	Boutsaba Sengpun	Kitsamai Bunteewawong	Ponwilai Luanglat	Maikham Wilaiwan	Satiw Saengsulith	ITECC Mall	20
2015	Soutilak Inthavong	Puladda Saidonkhong	Anida Mingbubpha	Tiddawan Bunyalid	Padmanee Pilakong	ITECC Mall	20
2013	Vilaylak Chanthavong	Peeyamad Poonpased	Somthawin Siluangchai	Saensompon Saenkhamyoung	Sunidta Phameechai	Donchan Pharet Hall	19
2012	Christina Lasasimma	Ponsuda Sisombat	Thida Sittichai	Somkid Sidpanya	Phatsalin Suksidthi	Donchan Pharet Hall	20
2011	Thidalat Vongsili	Jeelapha Pompakdee	Thip-Phakeson Meechibua	Phonmanee Sida	Patthamon Chantawong	Donchan Pharet Hall	20
2010	Malaythip Singsahanath	Yodtida Buasi	Buapan Sisombat	Jiddawon Siritham	Wanida Panthawang	Donchan Pharet Hall	24
2009	Phailinda Philavanh	Wongphachan Wongwilasak	Niphaphon Phommachan	Chanpasong Sittiphan	Suphaphon Inthawong	Donchan Pharet Hall	23

==== Winners by province ====
Provinces	Titles	Winning Years
Vientiane Prefecture	7	2009, 2011, 2012, 2015, 2017, 2020, 2021
Luang Prabang	2	2019, 2022
Sainyabuli	2	2013, 2016
Luang Namtha	1	2023
Savannakhet	1	2018
Bokeo	1	2010

=== Miss Universe Laos ===
Year	Miss Universe Laos	Runners Up				Venue	Number
Year	Miss Universe Laos	First	Second	Third	Fourth	Venue	Number
2025	Lattana Munvilay	Soudavone Inthavong	Lothjana Khounnavong	Not Awarded		Crowne Plaza Vientiane	18
2024	Phiranya Thipphomvong	Phoudthasone Phimmakaisone	Soukthida Paseuth	Not Awarded		Saint Phila Convention Hall	18
2023	Phaimany Lathsabanthao	Phiranya Thipphomvong	Phavina Mounvongsa	Not Awarded		National Convention Hall	15
2022	Payengxa Lor	Phaimany Lathsabanthao	Lattana Munvilay	Not Awarded		Crowne Plaza Hotel, Vientiane	20
2021	Tonkham Phonchanhueang	Manida Nenhouangmala	Vaniphone Phoumixay	Not Awarded		Crowne Plaza Hotel, Vientiane	16
2019	Vichitta Phonevilay	Phaithida Phothisane	Lattana Munvilay	Not Awarded		Landmark Mekong Riverside Hotel, Vientiane	30
2017	Souphaphone Somvichith	On-anong Homsombath	Varissara Tangsouvanh	Souksavanh Luanglath	Malisa Sidachanh	Lao National Cultural Hall, Vientiane	10

==== Winners by province ====
Provinces	Titles	Winning Years
Vientiane	4	2018, 2020, 2021
Salavan	1	2025
Houaphanh	1	2024
Phongsaly	1	2023
Xiangkhouang	1	2022
Bolikhamsai	1	2019
Champasak	1	2017

=== Miss World Laos ===
Year	Miss World Laos	Runners Up				Vanue	Number
Year	Miss World Laos	First	Second	Third	Fourth	Vanue	Number
2021	Phonvilai Luanglath (Successor) Phongsavanh Souphavady (Resigned)	Aliya Inthavong Phonvilai Luanglath (cancellation)	Suddala Silavong Aliya Inthavong (cancellation)	Not Awarded	Not Awarded	Landmark Mekong Riverside Hotel, Vientiane	20
2019	Nelamith Soumounthong	Panida Boupha	Sanita Swengchhk	Not Awarded	Not Awarded	The Landmark Hotel, Vientiane	19
2018	Kadoumphet Xayyavong	Santhany Saimanivan	Saengsavanh Sihalat	Sunita Xayasana	Duangthip Phothisomphan	The Landmark Hotel, Vientiane	20

==== Winners by province ====
Provinces	Titles	Winning Years
Vientiane	2	2019, 2021
Oudomxay	1	2018

=== Miss International Laos ===
Year	Miss International Laos	Runners Up				Vanue	Number
Year	Miss International Laos	First	Second	Third	Fourth	Vanue	Number
2024	Shasikone Shasit	Mongkoutphet Harnsana	Thipphachan Sombounthip	Philada Soulinthong	Chittakone Mounthavy	Amari Vang Vieng, Vientiane	20
2018	Piyamarth Phounpaseuth	Yatfa Phommavonghxay	Khunnasin Phimpha	Not Awarded	Not Awarded	Krao Plaza Hotel, Vientiane	20

==== Winners by province ====
Provinces	Titles	Winning Years
Champasak	1	2024
Vientiane	1	2018

=== Miss Supranational Laos ===
Year	Miss Supranational Laos	Runners Up		Vanue	Number
Year	Miss Supranational Laos	First	Second	Vanue	Number
2019	Narathip Siriphan	Vikada Manivong	Not Awarded	MEN folder,Vientiane	9

==== Winners by province ====
Provinces	Titles	Winning Years
Vientiane	1	2019

=== Miss Earth Laos ===
Year	Miss Earth Laos		Runners Up			Vanue	Number
Year	Miss Earth Laos		Miss Earth Air	Miss Earth Water	Miss Earth Fire	Vanue	Number
2025	Parami Viengmay		Farsai Chitpanya	Thipphavanh Vongkhamkeo	Nilamon Khinsamone	Muong Thanh Luxury Vientiane	12
2024	Fachalin Chounlamounty		Phoutthasone Phounvilai	Malisa Komphasouk	Manichanh Sounanthavong	Lao National Cultural Hall, Vientiane	16
Year	Miss Earth Laos	Runners Up				Vanue	Number
Year	Miss Earth Laos	Miss Earth Land	Miss Earth Air	Miss Earth Water	Miss Earth Fire	Vanue	Number
2023	Noulao Wamenglor	Somsouda Thepsouvan	Fachalin Chounlamounty	Lothjana Khounnavong	Oulayphone Soutthavong	Laotel Hotel, Vientiane	12

==== Winners by province ====
Provinces	Titles	Winning Years
Vientiane Prefecture	1	2025
Bolikhamsai	1	2024
Xiangkhouang	1	2023

=== Miss Grand Laos ===
Year	Miss Grand Laos	Runners Up				Venue	Number
Year	Miss Grand Laos	First	Second	Third	Fourth	Venue	Number
2025	Sirisopha Phimmakaisone	Louise Chanthalangsy	Bolanan Chanthavong	Phetphachan Phanthalangsy	Vanhnee Chaxouada	Crowne Plaza Vientiane, Vientiane	17
2024	Souksavanh Vongsomphou	Lothjana Khounnavong	Latsamee Kinnavong	Phavina Mounvongsa	Thipphavanh Inthavong	ITECC Shopping Mall, Xaysetha, Vientiane	17
2023	Phetmany Philakong	Louise Chanthalangsy	Palyna Khampasouk	Arisa Khennavong	Saythong Thammavong	National Convention Hall, Vientiane	18
2022	Phoutsavanh Vongkhamxao	Soukanya Soulivong	Chitta Thipphonephosy	Kittima Khanthaphengxai	Chindavan Saentavy	Crowne Plaza Vientiane, Vientiane	20
2019	Malailak Phachan	Phatthana Khidaphone	Not Awarded	Not Awarded	Not Awarded	Landmark Mekong Riverside Hotel, Vientiane	20
2018	Nobphalat Sykaiyphack	Manika Soukvongsa	Siliyaphone Xaphilom	Not Awarded	Not Awarded	Lao iTECC, Vientiane	12
2017	Chinnally Nolasing	Phounesup Phonyotha	Kitsada Vongsaisawad	Nidakone Chandalasane	Sengsavanh Sihalath	Lao iTECC, Vientiane	17

==== Winners by province ====
Provinces	Titles	Winning Years
Champasak	3	2019, 2024, 2025
Vientiane	3	2017, 2018, 2022
Vientiane Prefecture	1	2023

== Miss Laos representatives at International beauty pageants ==
- : Declared as Winner
- : Ended as runner-up or top 5/6 qualification
- : Ended as one of the Finalists
- : Ended as one of the Semi-finalists
- : Ended as special awards winner

=== Miss Universe ===
The winner of Miss Universe Laos represents her country at the Miss Universe. On occasion, when the winner does not qualify (due to age) a runner-up is sent.

Year	Province	Representative's Name	National Title	Placement at Miss Universe	Special Awards
2025	Salavan	Lattana Munvilay	Miss Universe Laos 2025	Unplaced	
2024	Houaphanh	Phiranya Thipphomvong	Miss Universe Laos 2024	Unplaced	
2023	Vientiane Prefecture	Phaimany Lathsabanthao	Miss Universe Laos 2023	Unplaced	
2022	Xiangkhouang	Payengxa Lor	Miss Universe Laos 2022	Top 16	1 Special Awards: Fan Vote Winner
2021	Vientiane Prefecture	Tonkham Phonchanhueang	Miss Universe Laos 2021	Unplaced	
2020	Vientiane Prefecture	Christina Lasasimma	Miss Lao 2012	Unplaced	
2019	Bolikhamsai	Vichitta Phonevilay	Miss Universe Laos 2019	Unplaced	
2018	Vientiane Prefecture	On-anong Homsombath	1st runner-up Miss Universe Laos 2017	Unplaced	1 Special Awards: Best National Costume
2017	Champasak	Souphaphone Somvichith	Miss Universe Laos 2017	Unplaced	

=== Miss World ===
The winner of Miss World Laos (separate pageant) represents her country at the Miss World. On occasion, when the winner does not qualify (due to age) a runner-up is sent. Before 2018 the 2nd placed of Miss Universe Laos went to Miss World.

Year	Province	Representative's Name	National Title	Placement at Miss World	Special Awards
2026	Vientiane Prefecture	Mongkoutphet Harnsana	1st runner-up Miss International Laos 2024	Unplaced	Top 20 - Multimedia Challenge (Top 5 of Asia and Oceania from 4 continentals); Top 60 - Multimedia Challenge (Top 14 of Asia and Oceania from 4 continentals)
2023	Vientiane Prefecture	Phonvilai Luanglath	Miss World Laos 2021 (Assumed)	Did not compete	
2022	Miss World 2021 was rescheduled to 16 March 2022 due to the COVID-19 pandemic outbreak in Puerto Rico, no edition started in 2022				
2021	Vientiane Prefecture	Phonvilai Luanglath	Miss World Laos 2021 (Assumed)	Did not compete	
2021	Vientiane Prefecture	Phongsavanh Souphavady	Miss World Laos 2021 (Resigned)	Did not compete	
2020	Due to the impact of COVID-19 pandemic, no competition held				
2019	Vientiane Prefecture	Nelamith Soumounthong	Miss World Laos 2019	Unplaced	
2018	Oudomxay	Kadoumphet Xaiyavong	Miss World Laos 2018	Unplaced	
2017	Vientiane Prefecture	Tonkham Phonchanhueang	Miss World Laos 2017	Unplaced	

=== Miss International ===
The Miss International Laos award from Miss Universe Laos contest or other pageants represents her country at the Miss International. On occasion, when the receiver does not qualify (due to age) another awardee is sent.

Year	Province	Representative's Name	National Title	Placement at Miss International	Special Awards
2025	Did not compete				
2024	Champasak	Shasikone Shasit	Miss International Laos 2024	Unplaced	
2023	Bokeo	Aliya Inthavong	1st runner-up Miss World Laos 2021	Unplaced	
2022	Luang Prabang	Puangtip Malichanh	Appointed	Unplaced	
Due to the impact of COVID-19 pandemic, no competition held between 2020―2021
2019	Vientiane Prefecture	Phaithida Phothisane	1st runner-up Miss Universe Laos 2019	Unplaced	
2018	Vientiane Prefecture	Piyamarth Phounpaseuth	Miss International Laos 2018	Unplaced	
2017	Vientiane Prefecture	Phounesup Phonnyotha	1st runner-up Miss Grand Laos 2017	Top 8 Finalists	

=== Miss Earth ===
Year	Province	Representative's Name	National Title	Placement at Miss Earth	Special Awards
2025	Vientiane Prefecture	Parami Viengmay	Miss Earth Laos 2025	Unplaced	
2024	Bolikhamsai	Fachalin Chounlamounty	Miss Earth Laos 2024	Unplaced	
2023	Xiangkhouang	Noulao Wamenglor	Miss Earth Laos 2023	Unplaced	
2022	Vientiane Prefecture	Tato Jitana Khidaphone	Appointed	Unplaced	
2021	Vientiane Prefecture	Roungfa Lattanasamay	Appointed	Unplaced	

=== Miss Supranational ===
The Miss Supranational Laos award from Miss Universe Laos contest or other pageants represents her country at the Miss Supranational. On occasion, when the receiver does not qualify (due to age) another awardee is sent.

Year	Province	Representative's Name	National Title	Placement at Miss Supranational	Special Awards
2025	Did not compete				
2024	Vientiane Prefecture	Christina Lasasimma	Miss Laos 2012	Unplaced	1 Special Award: Top 10 - Supra Fan-vote
2023	Did not compete				
2022	Vientiane Prefecture	Narathip Siripaphanh	Miss Supranational Laos 2021	Unplaced	2 Special Awards: Top 15 - Miss Elegance; Top 42 - Miss Supra Influencer (After 1st Round Challenge)
2021	Vientiane Prefecture	Narathip Siripaphanh	Miss Supranational Laos 2021	Did not compete	
2020	Due to the impact of COVID-19 pandemic, no competition held				
2019	Attapeu	Pulatda Saydonekhong	1st runner-up Miss Tourism Laos 2018	Unplaced	
2018	Vientiane Prefecture	Santhany Saimanyvan	1st runner-up Miss World Laos 2018	Unplaced	1 Special Award: Best National Costume
2017	Vientiane Prefecture	Kitsada Vongsaisawad	2nd runner-up Miss Grand Laos 2017	Did not compete	

=== Miss Grand International ===
The winner of Miss Grand Laos represents her country at the Miss Grand International. On occasion, when the winner does not qualify (due to age) a runner-up is sent.

Year	Province	Representative's Name	National Title	Placement at Miss Grand International	Special Awards
2026	Vientiane Prefecture	Louise Chanthalangsy	Miss Grand Laos 2026	TBA	
2025	Champasak	Sirisopha Phimmakaisone	Miss Grand Laos 2025	Top 22	1 Special Awards: Top 15 - Grand Talent
2024	Champasak	Souksavanh Vongsomphou	Miss Grand Laos 2024	Unplaced	
2023	Vientiane Prefecture	Phetmany Philakhong	Miss Grand Laos 2023	Top 20	1 Special Awards: Top 18 - Grand Voice Award
2022	Vientiane	Phoutsavanh Vongkhamxao	Miss Grand Laos 2022	Unplaced	
2021	Savannakhet	Daomixay Pachansitti	Appointed	Unplaced	
2020	Vientiane	Phatthana Khidaphone	1st runner-up Miss Grand Laos 2019	Unplaced	
2019	Champasak	Malailak Phachan	Miss Grand Laos 2019	Did not compete	
2018	Vientiane	Nobphalat Sykaiyphack	Miss Grand Laos 2018	Unplaced	1 Special Awards: Top 12 - Best in National Costume
2017	Vientiane	Chinnally Nolasing	Miss Grand Laos 2017	Top 20	3 Special Awards: Top 3 - The Front Row of Opening Dance; Top 10 - Best in National Costume; Top 10 - Best in Swimsuit
2013	Vientiane Prefecture	Christina Lasasimma	Miss Laos 2012	Did not compete	

=== Miss Cosmo ===
Year	Province	Representative's Name	National Title	Placement at Miss Cosmo	Special Awards
2025	Vientiane Prefecture	Christina Lasasimma	Miss Laos 2012	Top 21	1 Special Awards: Cosmo's Tourism Ambassador
2024	Xayaboury	Soliya Bounsayngam	Appointed	Unplaced	

=== Miss Charm ===
Year	Province	Representative's Name	National Title	Placement at Miss Charm	Special Awards
2025	Luang Namtha	Soudavone Inthavong	1st Runner-up Miss Universe Laos 2025	Unplaced	

=== Miss Global ===
Year	Province	Representative's Name	National Title	Placement at Miss Global	Special Awards
2023	Vientiane Prefecture	Budseng Vongchanthum	Appointed	Unplaced	
2019	Houaphan	Phookham Thiihomvong	Appointed	Unplaced	1 Special Awards: Miss Fashion
2017	Vientiane	Varissara Tangsouvanh	Appointed	Unplaced	

=== Miss Intercontinental ===
Year	Province	Representative's Name	National Title	Placement at Miss Intercontinental	Special Awards
2021	Vientiane	Souksavanh Luanglath	Appointed	Did not compete	
2018	Vientiane	Yardfah Phommavongxay	Appointed	Unplaced	

=== The Miss Globe ===
Year	Province	Representative's Name	National Title	Placement at Miss Intercontinental	Special Awards
2023	Luang Prabang	Puangtip Malichanh	Appointed	Unplaced	1 Special Awards: Miss Photogenic

=== Miss Tourism Queen International ===
Year	Province	Representative's Name	National Title	Placement at Miss Tourism Queen Int'l	Special Awards
2019	Vientiane	Vaniphone Phoumixay	Appointed	Did not compete	
2018	Vientiane	Varissara Tangsouvanh	Appointed	Unplaced	1 Special Awards: Miss Beauty Skin

=== Miss Tourism International ===
Year	Province	Representative's Name	National Title	Placement at Miss Tourism Int'l	Special Awards
2024	Vientiane	Chittakone Mounthady	4th Runner-up Miss International Laos 2024	Unplaced	
2019	Sainyabuli	Pavina Yongvongsitthi	Appointed	Did not compete	
2018	Vientiane	Thida Sitthixay	Appointed	Unplaced	1 Special Awards: Miss Socialite
2017	Vientiane	Malisa Sidachanh	Appointed	Did not compete	

=== Miss Tourism Queen of the Year International ===
Year	Province	Representative's Name	National Title	Placement at Miss Tourism Queen of the Year Int'l	Special Awards
2018	Vientiane	Sengsavanh Sihalath	Miss Tourism Queen of the Year Laos 2018	Did not compete	
2016	Vientiane	Varissara Tangsouvanh	Appointed	Unplaced	1 Special Awards: Miss Congeniality

=== Miss Tourism Metropolitan International ===
Year	Province	Representative's Name	National Title	Placement at Miss Tourism Metropolitan Int'l	Special Awards
2019	Sainyabuli	Pavina Yongvongsitthi	Appointed	Unplaced	

== Mister Laos ==
=== Mister Laos ===
Year	Mister Laos	Runners Up				Venue	Number
Year	Mister Laos	First	Second	Third	Fourth	Venue	Number
2022	Phommasit Sisan	Pasokxay Lathouly	Vili Jumanivong	Yingyang Wangthao	Phonthavady Choulamany	Crown Plaza Hotel, Vientiane	20
Year	Mister Laos	Mister International Laos				Venue	Number
2021	Sompheng Laoserng	Khamphouvong Khansanga				Crown Plaza Hotel, Vientiane	20

==== Winners by province ====
Provinces	Titles	Winning Years
Khammouane	1	2022
Phongsaly	1	2021

=== Mister Global Laos ===
Year	Mister Global Laos	Runners Up		Venue	Number
Year	Mister Global Laos	First	Second	Venue	Number
2021	Sengaphone Souriyamath	ALoun Xoydala	Dansavanh Sivisay	Lao Charoensin Co., Ltd,	12
2022	Jacky Phimmachak	Bounlaiy Lattanakone	Sengpaserd Xayasing	Indee Studio in Vientiane	12
2023	Sengphachanh Sengchanthavong	Sengathith Senabandith	Lung Thammavongsa	Lao National Cultural Hall	12

==== Winners by province ====
Provinces	Titles	Winning Years
Vientiane	1	2023
Savannakhet	1	2022
Vientiane Prefecture	1	2021

=== Mister International Laos ===
Year	Mister International Laos	Runners Up				Venue	Number
Year	Mister International Laos	First	Second	Third	Fourth	Venue	Number
2019	Thanouphon Xaythavone	Detharun Rattana	Jonethajuck Nouansengsy	Keosoupa Keopila	Chittakone Phomphiphak	Crowne Plaza Vientiane	20
Year	Mister Universe Laos (Mister International Laos)	Runners Up				Venue	Number
Year	Mister Universe Laos (Mister International Laos)	Mister Global Laos	Mister Tourism Laos	Mister National Universe Laos	Mister Cosmopolitan Laos	Venue	Number
2025	Sukiphon Vongsack	Youphalatch Phethany	Souvixay Sounakhen	Nilanseng Kaiyalath	Lattanavong Boutdy	Crowne Plaza Vientiane	18

==== Winners by province ====
Provinces	Titles	Winning Years
Oudomxay province	1	2025
Vientiane Prefecture	1	2019

=== Mister Supranational Laos ===
Year	Mister Supranational Laos	Runners Up				Venue	Number
Year	Mister Supranational Laos	First	Second	Third	Fourth	Venue	Number
2021	Phimmasone Singsavanh	Not Awarded	Not Awarded	Not Awarded	Not Awarded	MEN folder	10

==== Winners by province ====
Provinces	Titles	Winning Years
Vientiane	1	2021

== Mister Laos representatives at International beauty pageants ==
- : Declared as Winner
- : Ended as runner-up or top 5/6 qualification
- : Ended as one of the Finalists
- : Ended as one of the Semi-finalists
- : Ended as special awards winner

=== Mister World ===
Year	Province	Representative's Name	National Title	Placement at Mister World	Special Awards
2026	Vientiane Prefecture	Seesaward Boualavong	Appointed	TBA	
2024	Vientiane Prefecture	Sithpaseuth Syinthavong	Appointed	Unplaced	2 Special Awards: Top 17 – Multimedia; Top 36 – Talent

=== Manhunt International ===
Year	Province	Representative's Name	National Title	Placement at Manhunt International	Special Awards
2017	Vientiane Prefecture	Chanthachone Vilaisarn	Appointed	Unplaced	2 Special Awards: Loo Chang Huat Model; Best Participant Award

=== Mister International By Mister International Organization (Thailand-Based) ===
Year	Province	Representative's Name	National Title	Placement at Mister International	Special Awards
2025	Oudomxay province	Sukiphon Vongsack	Mister Universe Laos 2025	Unplaced	1 Special Awards: Xpedition - Most Charming Award
2024	Vientiane Prefecture	Niphon Minoymanny	Appointed	Unplaced	
2023	Vientiane Prefecture	Donesavanh Xaimonty	Top 10 at Mister Global Laos 2021	Unplaced	
2022	Luang Prabang	Sengtavanh Chaleunphonh	Appointed	Unplaced	
2021	Vientiane Prefecture	Khamphouvong Khansanga	Mister Laos 2021	Did not compete	
2019	Vientiane Prefecture	Thanouphon Xaythavone	Mister International Laos 2019	Did not compete	

=== Mister Global ===
Year	Province	Representative's Name	National Title	Placement at Mister Global	Special Awards
2025	Champasak	Youphalatch Phethany	Mister Global Laos 2025	Top 11	1 Special Awards: Best in National Costume
2024	Luang Namtha	Kisun Pansengmeruang	Mister Global Laos 2024	Top 11	
2023	Vientiane	Sengphachanh Sengchanthavong	Mister Global Laos 2023	Unplaced	2 Special Awards: 3rd Runner-Up - Mister Kantharawichai; Mister Congeniality (Mister Popular of Mahasarakham)
2022	Savannakhet	Jacky Phimmachak	Mister Global Laos 2022	Unplaced	
2021	Vientiane Prefecture	Sengaphon Souliyamath	Mister Global Laos 2021	Top 17	
2019	Vientiane Prefecture	Kiengkai Xouansouandao	Appointed	Unplaced	1 Special Awards: Most Charming Smile
2018	Vientiane Prefecture	Khampoon Boliboun	Appointed	Did not compete	

=== Mister Supranational ===
Year	Province	Representative's Name	National Title	Placement at Mister Supranational	Special Awards
2024	Luang Prabang	Sanonh Maniphonh	Appointed	4th Runner-Up	2 Special Awards: Top 10 - Supra Fan-Vote; Top 11 - Supra Model of the Year
2022	Vientiane	Phimmasone Singsavanh	Mister Supranational Laos 2021	Unplaced	1 Special Awards: Top 10 - Mister Talent
2019	Vientiane Prefecture	Singkham Phommasone	Appointed	Top 20	
