= Riya Sokół =

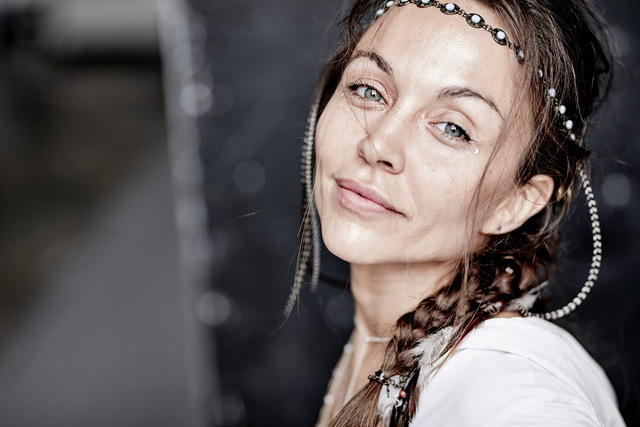
- Born: Patrycja Sokół; 7 December 1981; Warsaw, Poland
- Known for: Artist, singer, performer
- Website: Official site

Riya Sokół, also known as Pati Sokół, (born December 7, 1981, in Warsaw) is a Polish artist, singer, performer, author, and public speaker.

== Biography ==
She was born as Patrycja Sokół. She used that name until the beginning of her music career, and she legally changed it to Riya in 2016. She studied psychology at the Warsaw School of Social Psychology, and acting at Halina and Jan Machulski's acting school in Warsaw. From age 6 to 14, she showcased her talents in the children's dancing and singing group Varsovia, where she held the position of a soloist. At the age of nine, she collaborated with Ryszard Rynkowski to record a song for the "Heart for a Smile" Foundation (Polish: "Serce za Uśmiech"). Throughout her adolescent years, she lent her voice to various choirs featuring Polish singers and bands. In 2010, during the election campaign for the President of Warsaw, Sokół worked in the Electoral Headquarters of President Hanna Gronkiewicz-Waltz in the media communication department.

Her musical debut took place in March 2012 with the release of the single "Woman’s Work" under the name Pati Sokół, featuring a guest appearance by Weronika Rosati in the music video. This song received a nomination for the Audience Award – CyberYach at Yacht Film 2012. Her subsequent single, "(Let's Get) Naked", featured Tomasz Kot in its music video. Her following release, "Neverland", came out in May 2013, with Maciej Stuhr featured in the music video.

In 2014, Riya Sokół released her first album, Neverland, which was accompanied by a musical spectacle produced under the auspices of her foundation, "Neverland". This production was staged across Poland, offering support to individuals grappling with depression and their families. The show ran for two years on stages nationwide, including Warsaw's Teatr Polonia. The musical's production was overseen by the "Neverland" Foundation, a charitable organization dedicated to aiding those affected by depression, which Riya founded.

Her second album, titled I'mperfect/Nie’doskonałe, was launched in 2017. This project was a collaboration with Whisbear and was dedicated to women and mothers globally. Catherine, Princess of Wales, received a copy of the album and expressed her delight in listening to it.

In 2019, Riya received a Global Music Award for her song "Awaken as Love".

Following her recovery from an illness in 2016, she adopted the name Riya and expanded her repertoire to include mantras, while also venturing into teaching about motivation, working with the subconscious mind and conscious living. Additionally, she conducted meditation sessions at the Healthy Center, led by Anna Lewandowska.

== Author ==
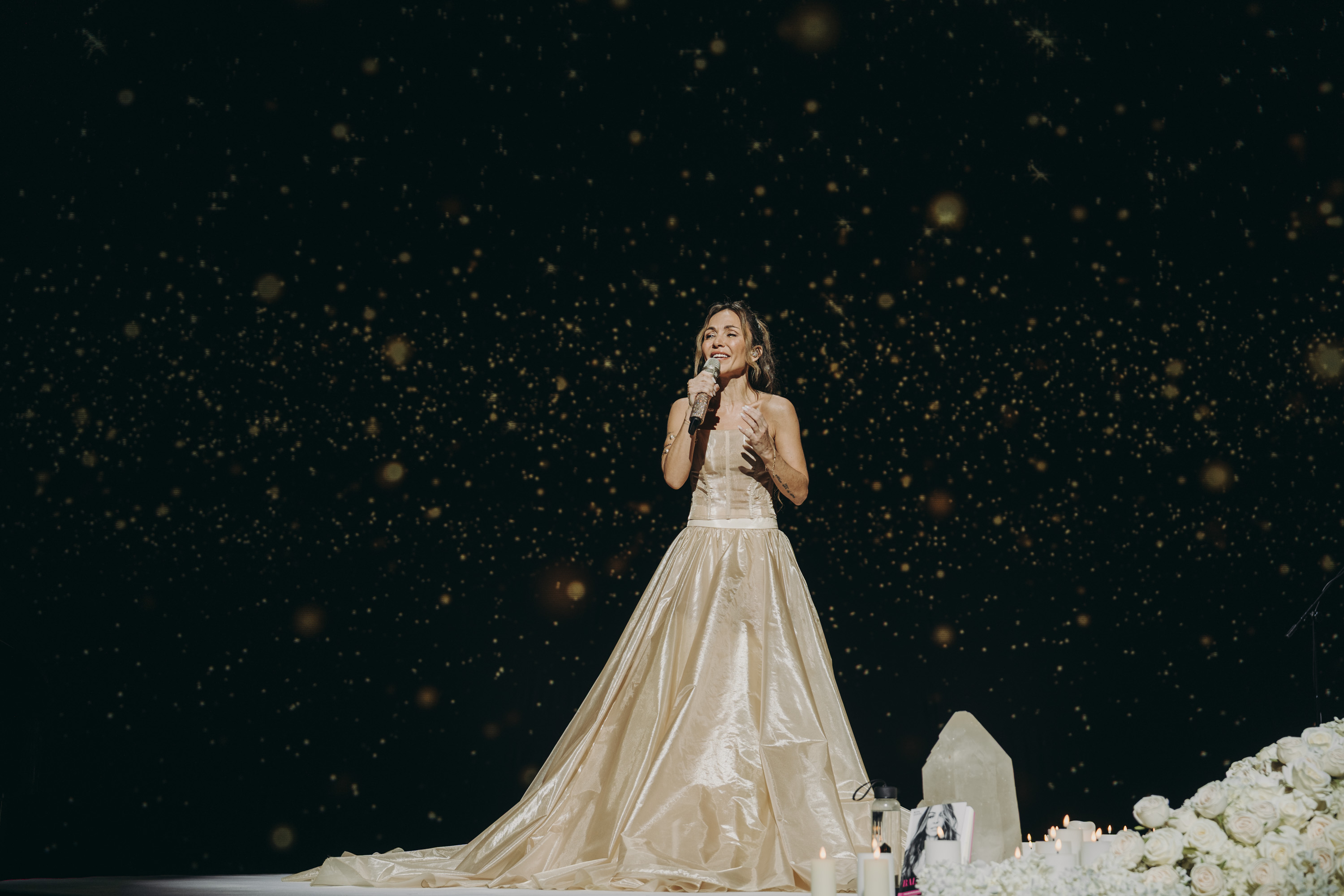
Riya Sokół at the Polish Theatre in 2025

Riya Sokół is the author of the book Bal trwa teraz. Transpersonalna autobiografia, published by the Polish publishing house Pascal in 2025. The book has also been contracted for the international market and is scheduled for its English-language premiere in Spring 2026, under its original title, God, Use Me.

== Vocalist and actress ==
Riya Sokół's voice is classified as a coloratura soprano with an extensive range, and is frequently employed in film scores. Her voice can be heard in the introduction of Borys Lankosz's TV series Paradoks, scored by Mikołaj Storiński. She also made an appearance in one of the episodes. In September 2011, she supported the "Nie jesteś sam" foundation of Fundacja TVN by performing the song "You Are Not Alone" at the Pepsi Arena during a charity football match, which was broadcast live on TVN television. In 2014, Riya participated in the artistic event "Addiction" at the Grand Theatre in Warsaw. At the culmination of Piotr Hull's performance, he shaved her head as an act of solidarity with a friend battling cancer.

== Songwriter ==
In 2014, she penned the English version of Paweł Lucewicz's promotional song for Jan Komasa's film Warsaw 44. She sang the song alongside Ania Iwanek and Piotr Cugowski. On July 30, 2014, prior to the film's premiere, she performed the song at the National Stadium in Warsaw in front of Polish President Bronisław Komorowski and the audience of 12,000 viewers. This song garnered the Kamer–TON 2014 award. Riya is credited as the lyricist and performer of songs composed by Paweł Lucewicz for the TV series Friends (Polish: Przyjaciółki), directed by Grzegorz Kuczeriszka. Additionally, she is the creator of the viral video-poem "Thank You, Coronavirus", which addressed the global COVID-19 pandemic and was translated into numerous languages, earning multiple international awards.

== Awards ==
- 2012: CyberYach award for the "Woman's Work" music video
- 2014: Kamer-TON award for the song "Warsaw 44" from Jan Komasa's film Miasto 44
- 2019: Global Music Award for the song "Awaken As Love"
- 2020: "Best Micro-Film" at the Independent Short Awards, for the viral video-poem “Thank you, coronavirus”
- 2020: "Official Selection" at the New Indie Film Festival of London, for the viral video-poem "Thank you, coronavirus"
- 2020: "Semi-Finalist" at the 2020 Australia Independent Film Festival, for viral video-poem "Thank you, coronavirus"
- 2023: the "Charismatic Leader Among Conscious Speakers" award at the Polish Businesswoman Awards, by the magazine Business Woman & Life

== Discography ==
Albums

- Neverland (2014)
- I’mperfect (2017)
- Nie’doskonałe (2017)
- Thank You (2020)
- KODY 12:12 (2022)
- CODES 12:12 (2022)

Singles

- "Woman's Work" (2012) from the album Neverland
- "Let's Get Naked" (2012) from Neverland
- "Neverland" (2013) from Neverland
- "Miasto" (2014) from Miasto 44 O.S.T.
- "About Herself / O sobie samej" (2017) from I’mperfect/Nie’doskonałe
- "You Are Loved / Kocham Cię (2018) from I’mperfect/Nie’doskonałe
- "Lokah Samastah Sukhino Bhavantu" (2019)
- "In Lak’ech Ala K’in" (2019)
- "Even If" (2019) from I’mperfect/Nie’doskonałe
- "Niech Żyje Bal" (2021)
- "Como explico (Jak wytłumaczyć)" (2024), a duet with Rodrigo Massa
- "Macarena" (2025)

Music videos

- "Woman's Work" (2012) dir. Magda Targosz
- "Let's Get Naked" (2012) dir. Rafał Samborski
- "Neverland" (2013) dir. Patrycja Woy-Woyciechowska
- "Miasto" (2014) dir. Kuba Łubniewski
- "About Herself / O sobie samej" (2017) dir. Filip Kalczyński
- "You Are Loved / Kocham Cię" (2018) dir. Filip Kalczyński
- "Lokah Samastah Sukhino Bhavantu" (2019) dir. Riya Sokół
- "Even If" (2019) dir. Hannah Walsh
- "Niech Żyje Bal" (2021) dir. Polina Zet
- "Como explico (Jak wytłumaczyć)" (2024)
- "Macarena" (2025), dir. Michał Konrad
