= Andrzej Eliasz =

Polish psychologist

Andrzej Eliasz is a Polish psychologist, professor, former rector of the SWPS University of Humanities and Social Sciences (1996-2016) and chairman of the board of trustees.

Eliasz was born in 1941. He earned his first undergraduate degree from Warsaw University. In 1972 he obtained a doctoral degree. In 1990 he was awarded the title of professor of humanities. Eliasz worked at the Central Institute for Labor Protection and the Institute of Psychology of the Polish Academy of Sciences.

== Awards ==
In 2011 Andrzej Eliasz was awarded the Officer's Cross of the Order of Polonia Restituta.
