= SWPS University Press =

Polish university press

- Parent company: SWPS University
- Founded: 2002; 23 years ago
- Country of origin: Poland
- Headquarters location: Warsaw, Poland
- Key people: Publications Coordinator: Andrzej Łabędzki
- Publication types: Books, journals
- Official website: english.swps.pl/university/swps-university-press

The SWPS University Press is the publishing house of SWPS University. It was established in 2002 as Academica. In 2011 Academica Press was renamed Wydawnictwo Uniwersytetu SWPS. It is located in the main university campus, on Chodakowska street in Warsaw. It publishes scientific journals, monographs and textbooks and books written by the university scientists.

== Publications ==
- Acta Sueco-Polonica
- Azja-Pacyfik
- Themis Polska Nova
- Kultura Popularna
