= Vichitta Phonevilay =

Laotian model

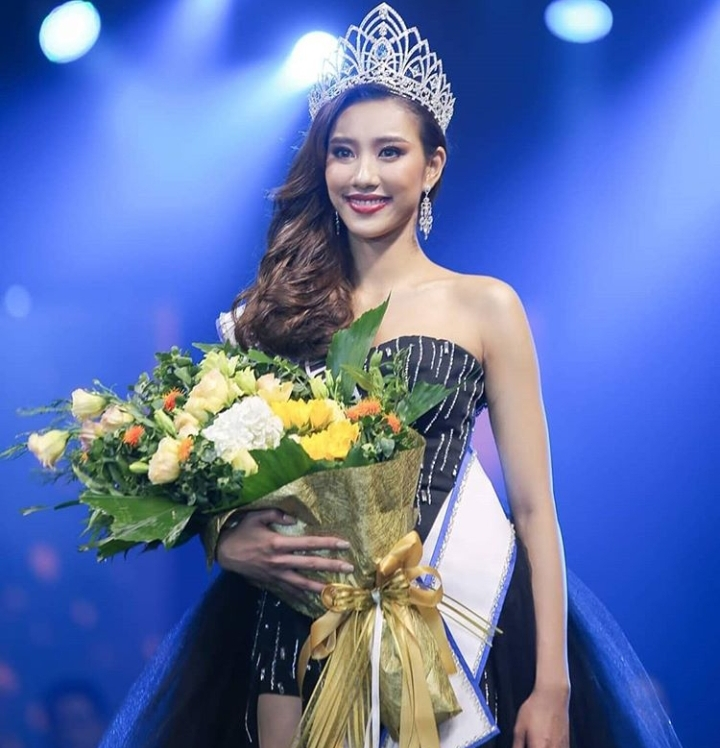
- Born: Paksan, Laos
- Beauty pageant titleholder
- Title: Miss Universe Laos 2019
- Major competition: Miss Universe Laos 2019 (winner)

Vichitta Phonevilay (Lao: ວິຈິດຕາ ພອນວິໄລ;) is a Laotian model and beauty pageant titleholder who won Miss Universe Laos 2019.

== Pageantry ==
=== Miss Universe Laos 2019 ===
Phonevilay won Lao Super Model 2016 and began her pageantry career representing Bolikhamsai Province at Miss Universe Laos 2019 on August 24, 2019, at the Landmark Mekong Riverside Hotel, where she won the title of Miss Universe Laos 2019. She was crowned by outgoing titleholder On-anong Homsombath.

Awards and achievements
Preceded by On-anong Homsombath	Miss Universe Laos; 2019	Succeeded by Christina Lasasimma
