= SWPS University =

University in Poland

Coordinates: 52°14′54″N 21°04′01″E

- Polish: Uniwersytet SWPS
- Former name: Szkoła Wyższa Psychologii Społecznej
- Type: Private
- Established: 1996
- Founders: Piotr Voelkel, Andrzej Eliasz, Zbigniew Pietrasiński and Janusz Reykowski
- Affiliations: EUA, Socrates-Erasmus
- Rector: Associate Professor Roman Cieślak, Ph.D.
- Faculty: 545
- Administrative staff: over 1000
- Students: 16,946 (10.2024)
- Location: Warsaw, Wrocław, Sopot, Poznań, Katowice, Kraków, Poland
- Campus: Urban
- Colours: Black, White
- Website: swps.pl

SWPS University (Polish: Uniwersytet SWPS) is a private non-profit university in Poland, established in 1996. Renowned for its excellence in the social sciences, particularly psychology, it operates six campuses across major Polish cities, with its primary campus located in Warsaw.

As of 2025, the university has an enrollment of over 17,800 students in undergraduate, graduate, and doctoral programs. This includes a growing international community of approximately 1,200 students from over 80 countries, spread across 56 full-time and 41 part-time programs. Additionally, around 4,000 professionals have enrolled in the 200 post-diploma professional courses offered by the university in the 2025/2026 academic year. To date, 46,000 degree-seeking students and 44,200 post-diploma course participants have graduated from SWPS University.

== Rankings and recognition ==
SWPS University consistently features in major international rankings, including the Times Higher Education (THE) World University Rankings and THE Impact Rankings, as well as the Shanghai Global Ranking of Academic Subjects (GRAS, it is part of the Shanghai Ranking), where it stands as the only non-public Polish university.

- Shanghai Ranking GRAS:
  - Sociology 2025: 151–200 (1st in Poland)
  - Psychology 2025: 301–400 (2nd in Poland)
- THE Global: 1201–1500 (5th in Poland)
- THE by Subject 2025:
  - Psychology: 401–500 (4th in Poland)
  - Social Sciences: 501–600 (3rd in Poland)
- U.S. News: Best Global Universities for Psychiatry/Psychology 2026: 244 (2nd in Poland)
- THE Impact Rankings 2025: 401–600
  - SDG 5 (Gender Equality): 101–200
  - SDG 10 (Reduced Inequalities): 201–300

== History ==
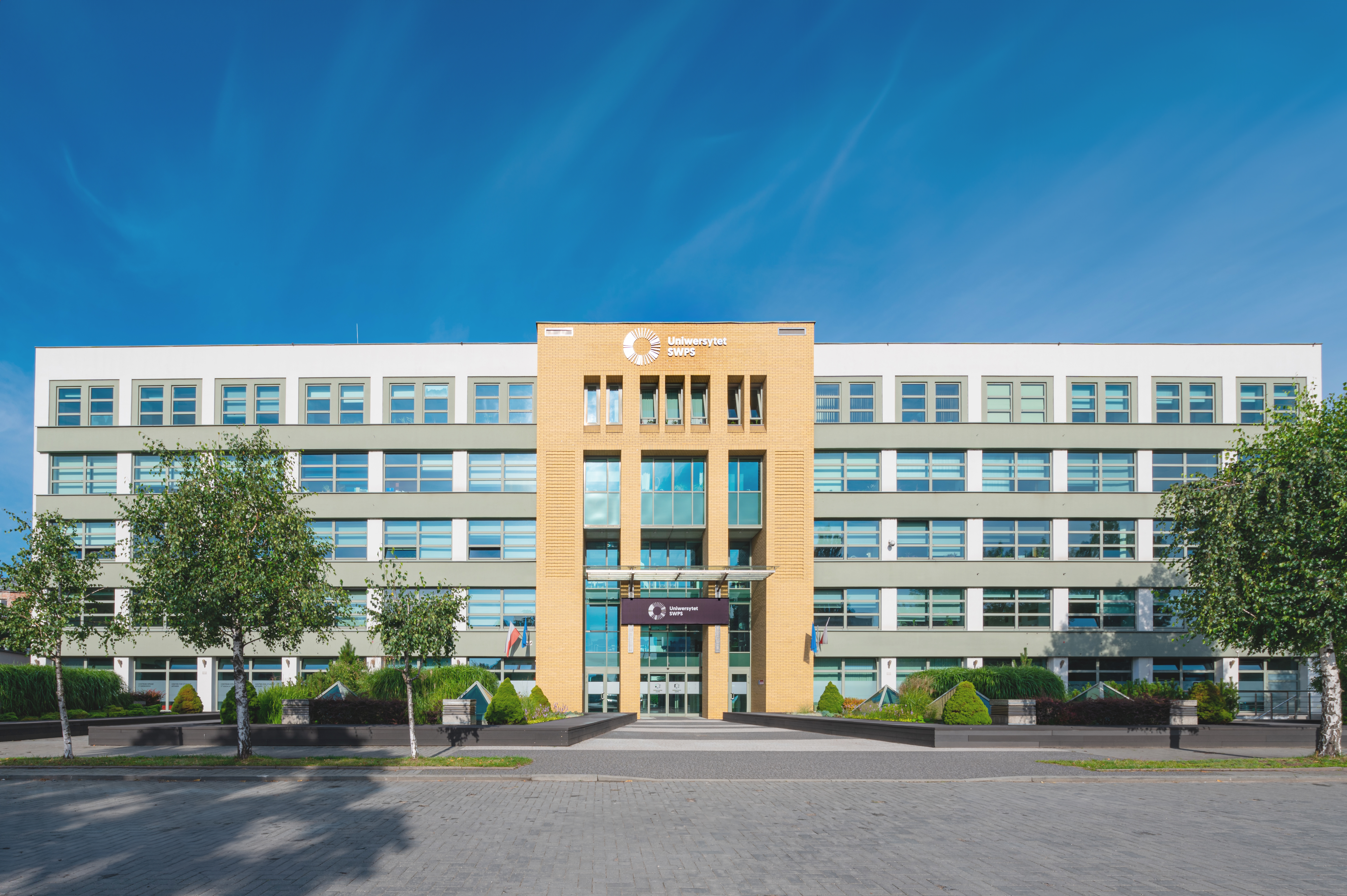
SWPS University in Warsaw

SWPS University was founded in 1996 as the Warsaw School of Social Psychology (Polish: Szkoła Wyższa Psychologii Społecznej, later also known as SWPS University of Social Sciences and Humanities) by renowned psychologists from the Polish Academy of Sciences: Prof. Andrzej Eliasz, Prof. Zbigniew Pietrasiński, and Prof. Janusz Reykowski. Professor Andrzej Eliasz served as the Rector of SWPS for the university's first two decades (1996-2016).

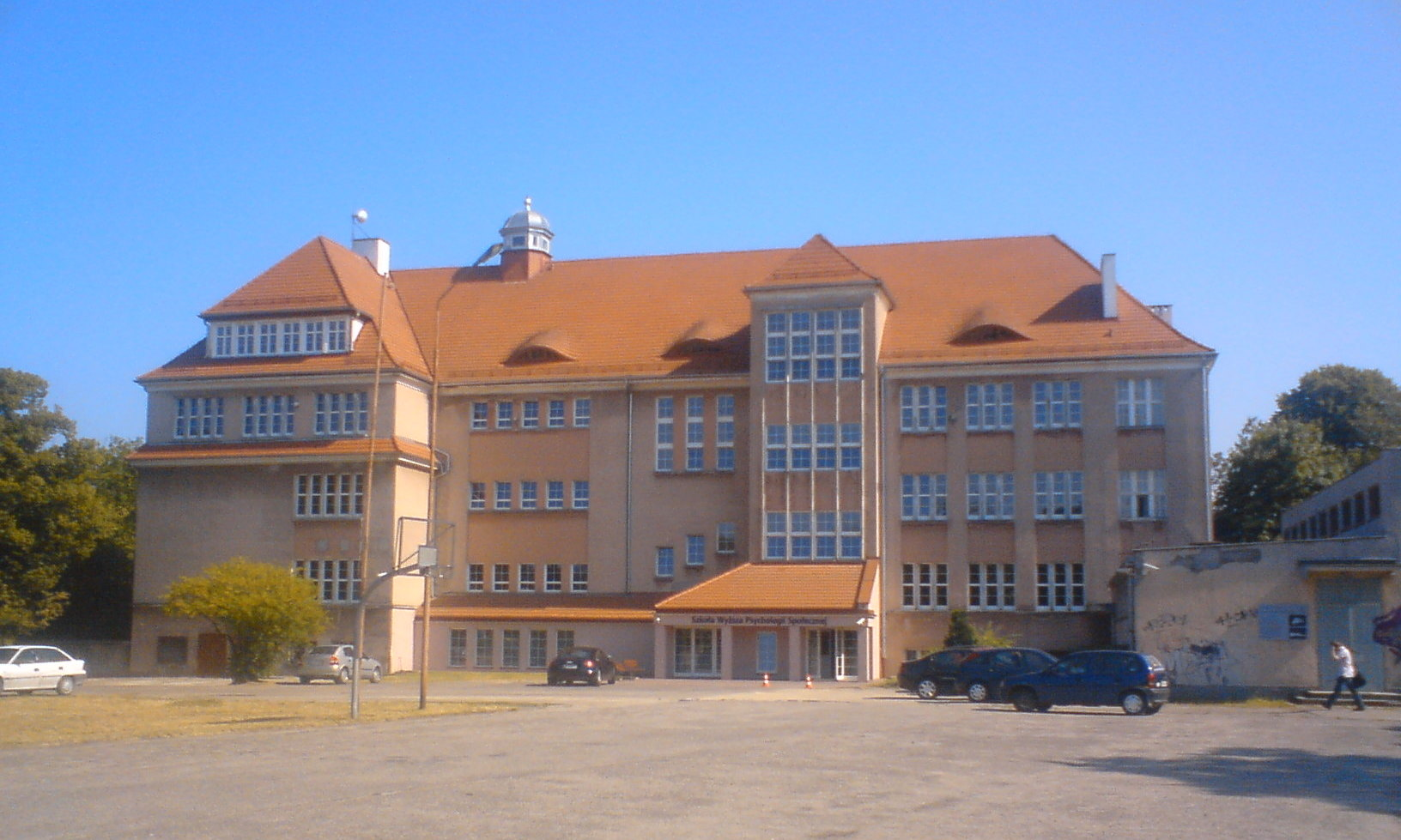
SWPS University in Sopot

As one of the first private higher education institutions in Poland to specialize in psychology and the social sciences, SWPS launched its inaugural five-year Master's program in psychology with approximately 500 students. In 2008, the role of the SWPS University founder, as defined in Polish law, was legally transferred to the Institute for the Development of Education and its president, Piotr Voelkel.

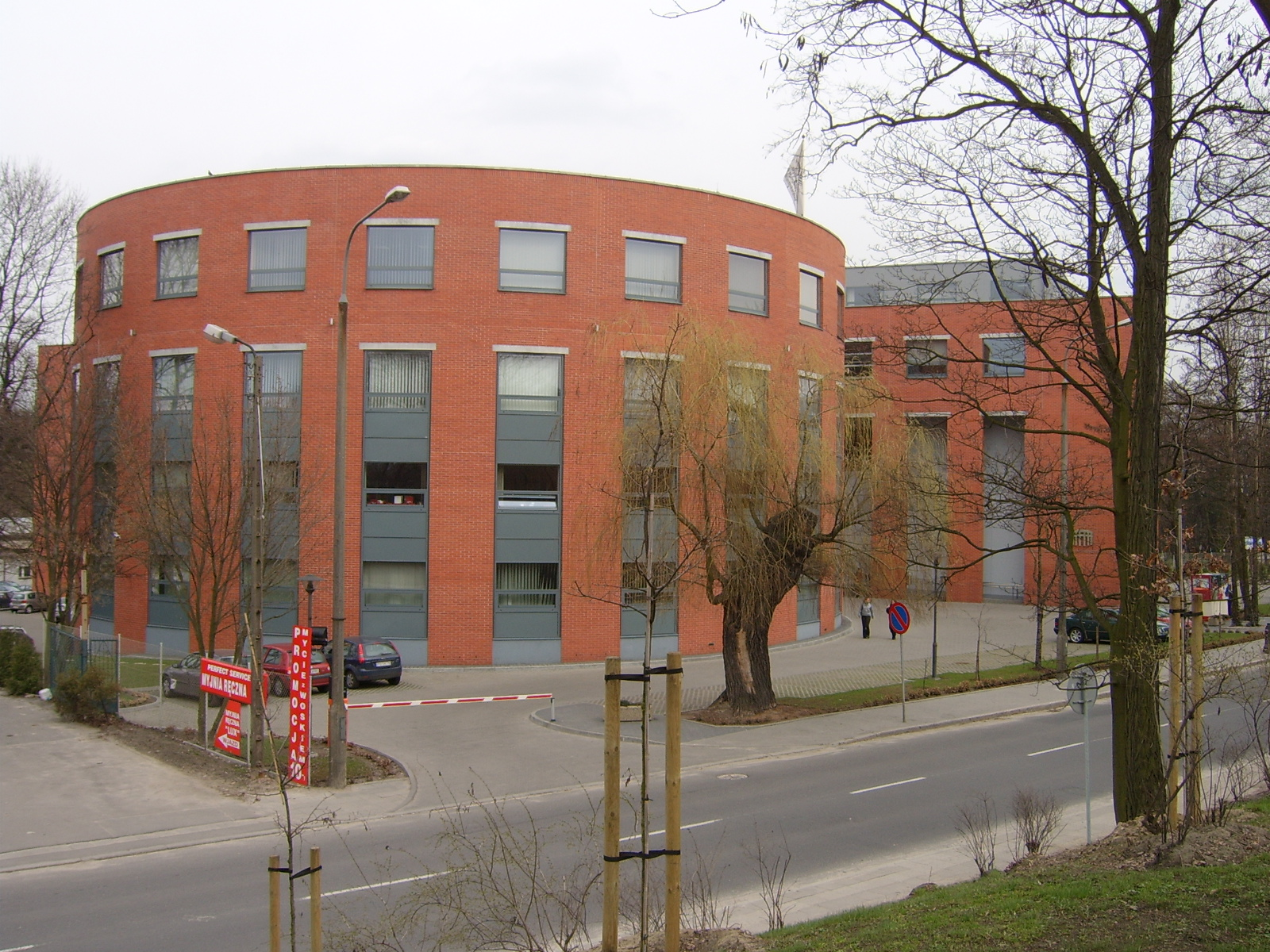
SWPS University in Poznań

Throughout the 2000s, SWPS expanded its national footprint, opening campuses in Wrocław and Sopot (2002), Poznań (2003), Katowice (2014), and Kraków (2023). The curriculum grew to include law, management, design, media and communication, and Asian studies. It also introduced computer science programs, often designed as interdisciplinary studies in combination with psychology.

In 2023, the institution was granted full university status under Polish higher education law and adopted its current name, SWPS University, becoming one of Poland's largest non-public, non-profit universities. In the same year, SWPS University joined the European Reform University Alliance (ERUA), established under the European Universities Initiative. This membership places the SWPS among the approximately 10% of European higher education institutions included in such federations.

ERUA comprises eight universities: the University of Paris 8 (France), the University of the Aegean (Greece), New Bulgarian University (Bulgaria), European University Viadrina (Germany), Mykolas Romeris University (Lithuania), the University of Las Palmas de Gran Canaria (Spain), the University of Macerata (Italy), and SWPS University. This partnership is a key framework for integrating the University into the international academic community, specifically aiming to enhance the European Higher Education Area through joint programmes, interdisciplinary initiatives, and collaborative research.

== Mission and values ==
Guided by its 2024–2029 Strategy and the core values of openness, responsibility, and courage, SWPS University's mission is to drive positive change in society, government, and business. It achieves this through educational programs that bridge theory and practice, leveraging research and global partnerships with universities, businesses, public entities, and social organisations. The university is committed to creating solutions that enhances quality of life and sustainable development while fostering a community that values diversity and mutual respect.

== Governance and administration ==
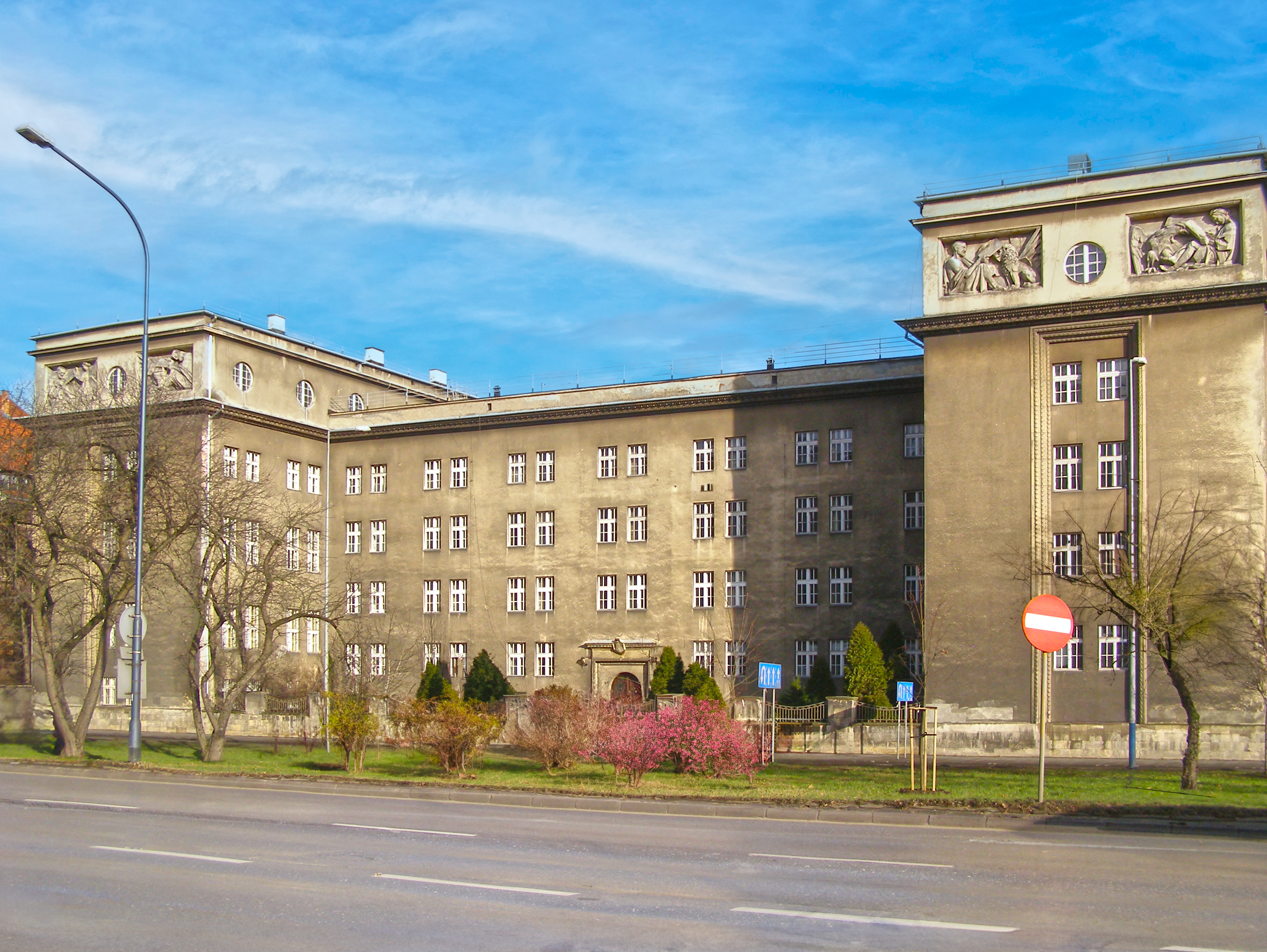
SWPS University in Kraków

Academic division:

- Rector: Professor Roman Cieślak (2016–present), psychologist
- Vice-Rector for Educational Affairs: Kamila Jankowiak-Siuda, Ph.D.
- Vice-Rector for International Affairs: Ewa Gruszczyńska, Ph.D.
- Vice-Rector for Research: Aleksandra Cisłak-Wójcik, Ph.D.

Organisational division:

- Director General: Ewa Ger, Ph.D.
- Director of Finance, Deputy Director General: Marcin Gędziorowski, Ph.D.
- Director of Marketing and Admissions, Deputy Director General: Kinga Nowacka
- Director for Professional Education, Deputy Director General: Jan Jaworowski

== Academic profile ==
SWPS University, across its six campuses, offers Bachelor's, Master's, and long-cycle programmes in the social sciences, humanities, and arts. These include the disciplines of psychology, law, sociology, management and quality studies, political and administrative sciences, social communication and media studies, culture and religion studies, literary studies, and fine arts and art conservation. As of 2025, the university offers 12 programs taught entirely in English and over 40 in Polish, covering 99 distinct specializations.

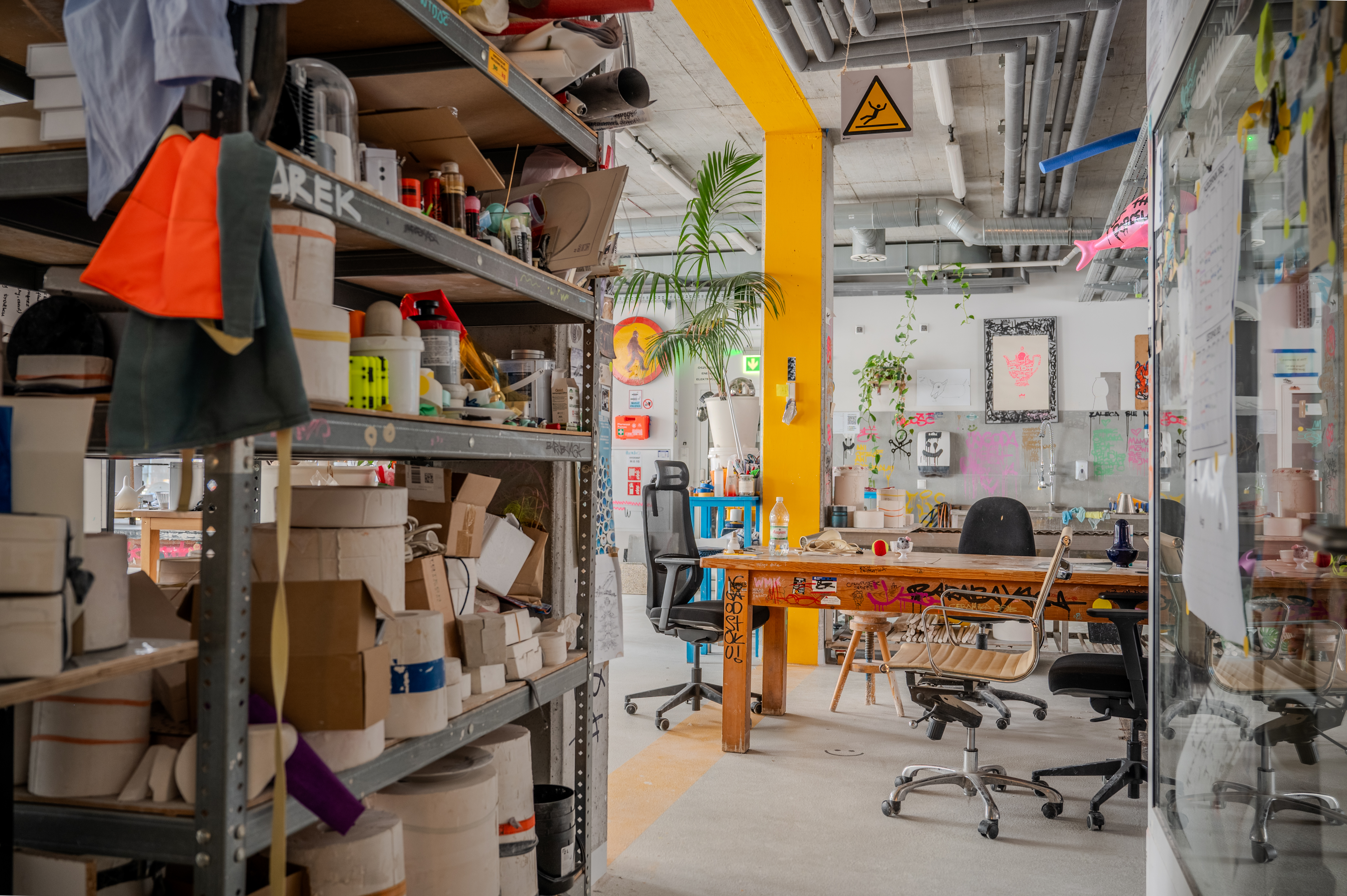
Teaching room

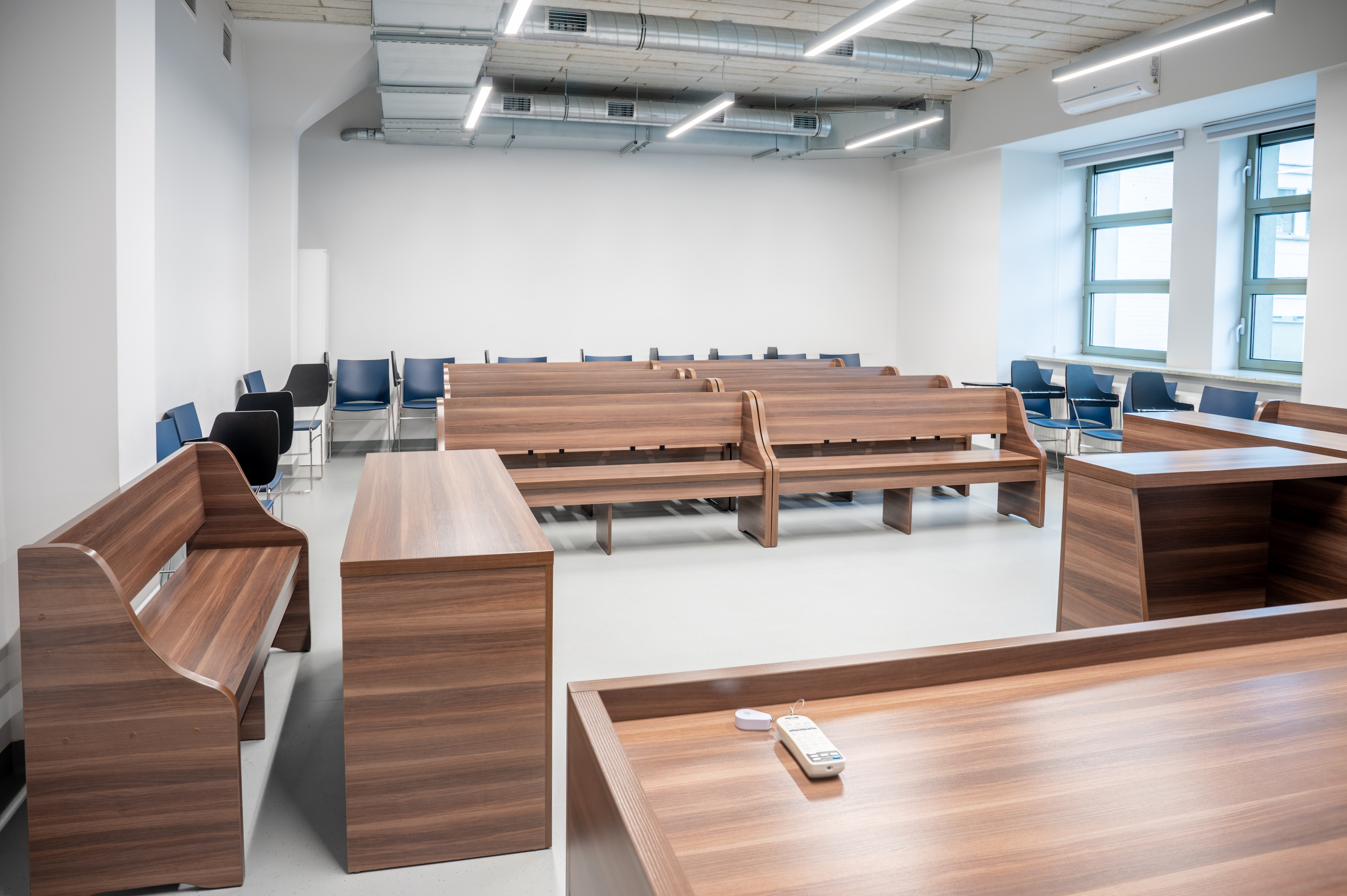
Teaching room: mock courtroom

Campuses and Faculties:

- Warsaw campus:
  - Faculty of Psychology in Warsaw
  - Faculty of Humanities in Warsaw
  - Faculty of Social Sciences in Warsaw
  - Faculty of Design in Warsaw
  - Faculty of Law in Warsaw
- Kraków campus:
  - Faculty of Interdisciplinary Studies in Kraków
  - Faculty of Psychology in Kraków
- Sopot campus:
  - Faculty of Psychology in Sopot
- Katowice campus:
  - Faculty of Psychology in Katowice
- Wrocław campus:
  - Faculty of Psychology in Wrocław
  - Faculty of Law and Communication in Wrocław
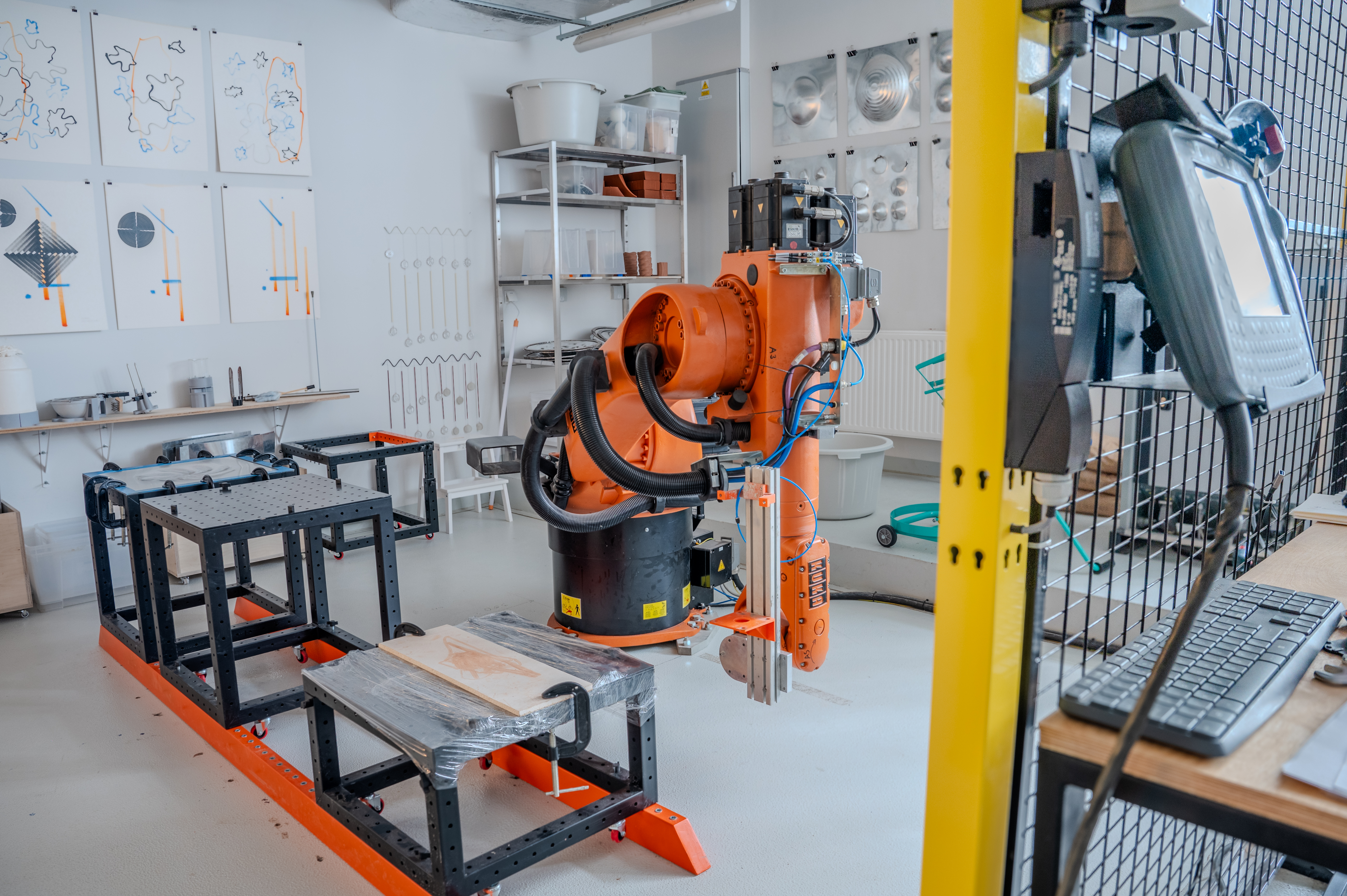
- Teaching room:
  Poznań campus:
  - Faculty of Psychology and Law in Poznań

SWPS University maintains broad international cooperation, established through over 200 agreements with institutions worldwide, including partners in North America, East Asia, and across Europe via the Erasmus+ programme. This network provides significant mobility opportunities for both students and staff.

The University's commitment to global education is highlighted by its coordinating role in several key collaborative initiatives. SWPS leads Green Mundus (an Erasmus Mundus Design Measures project developing a joint Master's degree in the psychology of climate action) and coordinates JUSTMobi (Digitalising Education for an Inclusive Mobility Transition), an Erasmus+ Key Action 2 project focused on equitable urban mobility. The University also participates in the Erasmus Mundus joint Master's degree Global MINDS: Psychology of Global Mobility, Inclusion, and Diversity in Society, delivered in cooperation with the University of Limerick, the University of Oslo, and ISCTE - University Institute of Lisbon, which prepares graduates for specialised work in social and cultural psychology.

== Research institutes and centres ==
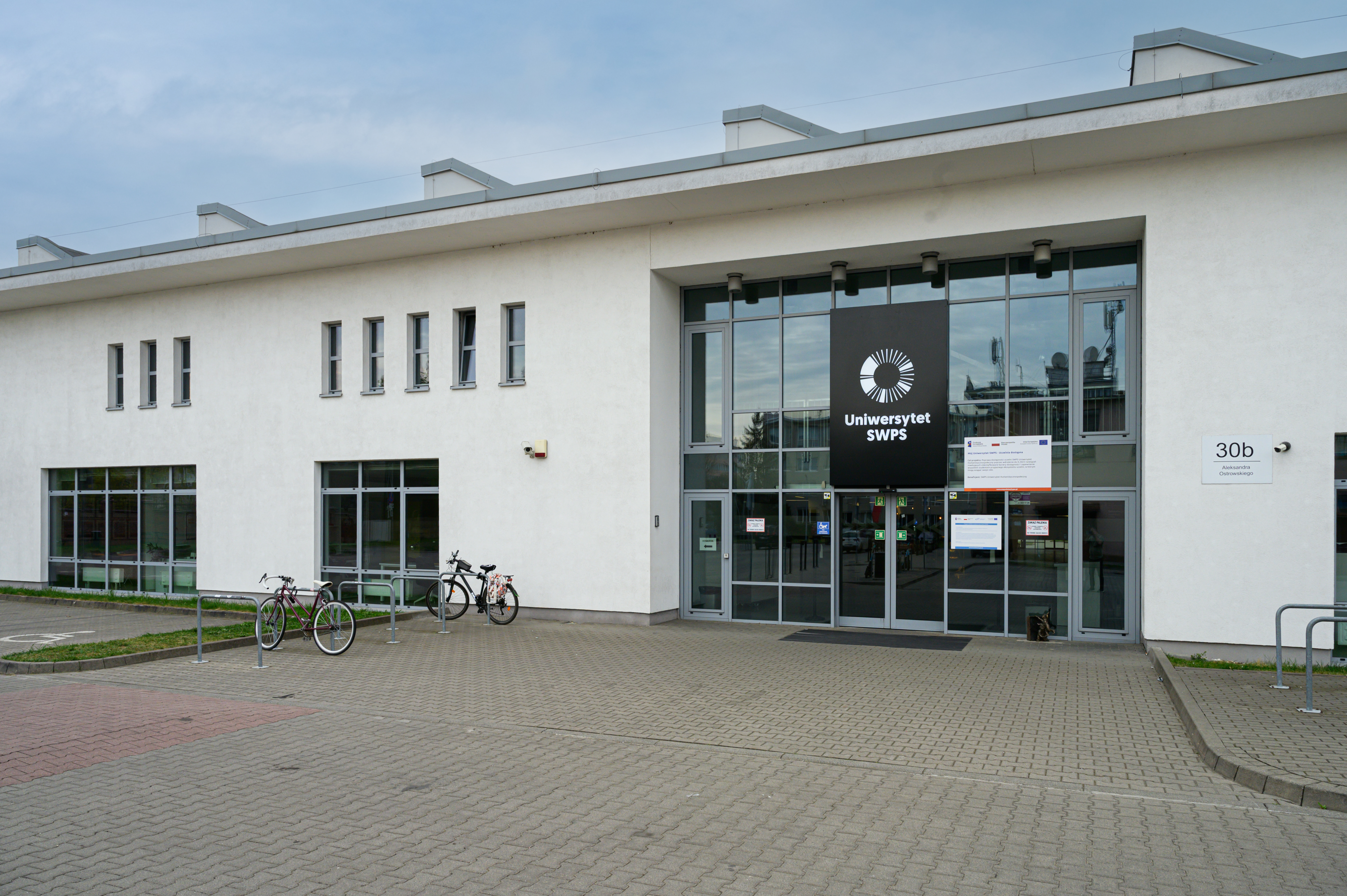
SWPS University in Wrocław

SWPS University identifies as a research-driven institution with a strong interdisciplinary and applied orientation. It maintains over 30 research centres and five institutes - Psychology, Social Sciences, Humanities, Law, and Design - responsible for doctoral and postdoctoral programmes and research projects. By 1 October 2025, the university had awarded doctoral degrees to 514 individuals, and 122 had obtained the degree of habilitated doctor.

More than 2,400 publications authored by SWPS researchers are indexed in Scopus, with about 20% appearing in top international journals. Key research areas include behavioural and cognitive neuroscience, intercultural communication, design for social innovation, and law and society.

SWPS holds the highest rating in psychology and political and administrative sciences (A+) and a high rating in sociology (A) from the Polish Ministry of Science and Higher Education, placing it among Poland's top research institutions. In 2016, the university was granted the HR Excellence in Research award by the European Commission, which was subsequently renewed in February 2024.

== Doctoral School ==
The Doctoral School of SWPS University is an English-language, interdisciplinary program training future researchers in the disciplines of psychology, sociology, political and administrative sciences, culture and religion studies, literary studies, fine arts and art conservation, and law. Its innovative model combines academic excellence with strong practical and international components.

Every doctoral candidate is a member of one of the University's 33 research and development centres, engaging in real research projects from the very beginning of their studies. The curriculum emphasises methodological rigour, mentoring, and development of transferable skills, aligning with European standards for doctoral education.

Recruitment is transparent and competitive, based on candidates' academic achievements and research potential, with clear and bilingual rules ensuring equal access. The School fosters international collaboration through mobility schemes, joint projects, and participation in European research networks. Continuous quality assurance, regular evaluation, and close cooperation between supervisors and doctoral candidates ensure high research standards and consistent academic growth. Since its establishment in 2019, the School has admitted 96 doctoral candidates.

== Student life ==
SWPS offers student organisations, athletic pursuits, and artistic activities across its campuses. This includes the central SWPS Student Council, three choirs, and sports clubs in Warsaw and Poznań. Numerous faculty-level organisations are active, including research groups and those focused on student integration and community building. There are many Faculties that the university offers, one of them being the Faculty of Law in Warsaw. They run a Student Legal Clinic, in which law students give free legal advice to people who cannot afford a lawyer, under the supervision of academics, advocates and legal advisors. They also offer consultations online. In the 2022 national ranking of student clinics compiled by Rzeczpospolita and the Foundation of University Legal Clinics, it shared first place with clinics from the University of Warsaw and several other Universities.

Student research clubs also support academic skills development through workshops on research methods, scientific writing and public speaking. The School of Ideas Student Research Club organises interdisciplinary projects and webinars, and collaborates with business and community partners on small research projects. Its activities also include meetings to help first-year students integrate.

Beyond extracurriculars, the university supports students with essential services, such as career counselling, the Erasmus Student Network (ESN), general counselling, and a comprehensive range of disability services and student health services, with a particular emphasis on mental well-being. SWPS also engages with new technologies, giving students the opportunity to become Adobe Campus Ambassadors.

In terms of governance, students are represented by local student councils on each campus. The chairpersons of these councils collectively form the Central Student Council. Additionally, SWPS students are actively represented in the broader European University Alliance (ERUA) student bodies, participating in the proceedings of both the local board and the ERUA Student Board.

== Social engagement ==
SWPS University integrates research and teaching with a practical social impact through proactive partnerships with public institutions, NGOs, local communities, and the business sector. These projects enhance societal welfare, focusing on areas such as mental health support (e.g., distributing 20,000 copies of the "How to Talk to Children About the Flood" guide for crisis assistance) and social inclusion (e.g. funding the "I Change the World" scholarship, enabling 2024 laureates to study free of charge).

The university also houses specialized departments dedicated to knowledge sharing and social outreach. These include the Centre for Knowledge Transfer (CTW) for the commercialisation of research results, a unit carrying out commercial projects in cooperation with external partners, and the Cognitive-Behavioural Therapy Clinic. The Clinic provides access to scientifically verified methods of psychological support while also serving as a practical research base for conducting studies and training students. Furthermore, SWPS shares expertise with public institutions by integrating academic social and psychological knowledge into strategic public planning and communication efforts.

== Doctors Honoris Causa of SWPS University ==
- 2011 – Prof. Helmut Skowronek, educational psychologist, former Rector of the University of Bielefeld
- 2011 – Prof. Philip Zimbardo, social psychologist, former President of the American Psychological Association
- 2013 – Prof. Shevah Weiss, Israeli politician, former Ambassador of Israel to Poland
- 2013 – Prof. Robert Cialdini, social psychologist, researcher of altruism and social influence
- 2016 – Prof. Jan Strelau, psychologist, creator of the Regulative Theory of Temperament
- 2022 – Prof. Mika Brzezinski, journalist, political commentator, and author

== Affiliations and partnerships ==
SWPS University is a member of numerous international organisations, including:

- Baltic University Programme (BUP)
- Business Graduates Association (BGA)
- Cumulus Association
- EUA Council for Doctoral Education
- European Consortium for Political Research (ECPR)
- European Union of Private Higher Education (EUPHE)
- European University Association (EUA)
- Global Academy of Liberal Arts (GALA)
- International Association of Universities (IAU)
- VITAE

== See also ==
- SWPS University Press
