= Australian rules football in Asia =

- Governing body: AFL Asia
- Registered players: 14,769 (2019)
- Clubs: 22

Club competitions
- Australian Football League Asia (AFL Asia); South China Australian Football League (SCAFL); Guangdong Australian Football League (GDAFL); Philippine AFL (PAFL); Asian Australian Football Championships

In Asia, Australian rules football dates back to 1910 but was only sporadically played until the 1980s after which it has boomed. Clubs have begun in most Asian countries and a governing body for the region, AFL Asia was formed in 2008 to coordinate the Asian Championship and promote its affiliated leagues. AFL Asia estimates that there are now more than 10,000 Australian Football players across the continent.

Up until the 2000s, the sport was played mainly by expatriate Australians, however in a growing list of countries including Japan, China, Pakistan, India, Indonesia, Sri Lanka, India and Timor-Leste there are competitions running is a large portion of locals in the playing base sufficient to field teams in international tournaments such as the Australian Football International Cup, the All-Asia Cup division of the Asian Australian Football Championships and the AFL Asia Cup.

There are now several regional leagues including the South China Australian Football League (SCAFL) (2011); South East Asia Australian Football League (SEAAFL) (2013); Guangdong Australian Football League (GDAFL) and North East Asia Australian Football League (NEAAFL) (2014).

The main tournament and cup competition is the annual Asian Australian Football Championships. Played every year since 2000 this international tournament is the pinnacle of Asian Australian football calendar. It currently comprises teams from over a dozen countries contesting for Asia's greatest trophy.

It is also emerging as a spectator sport, with professional Australian Football League matches attracting paying audiences, record attendance was set in Japan with 25,000 attending a 1986 exhibition match at Yokohama Stadium. China has hosted AFL matches at Jiangwan Stadium since 2017.

The most prominent player born in Asia is Australian Football Hall of Fame member Peter Bell (of South Korea) while the most prominent locally developed player is Michito Sakaki (of Japan).

Australian rules is broadcast into Asia on satellite television through the Australia Network.

== History ==
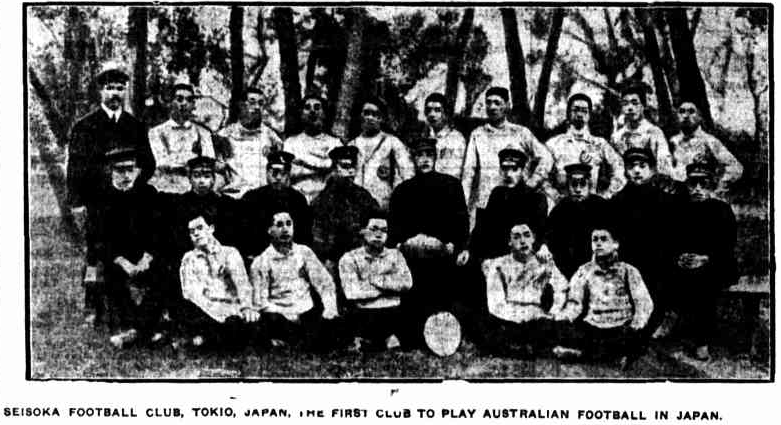
Seisoka Football Club, Tokio 1911

Australian rules football in Japan was first introduced in 1910. A. W. McLean founded the Seisoka Football Club and was successful in introducing it as a sport to four large high schools in Tokyo by having the rules translated into Japanese. McLean had hoped to select a national team, however met with a lack of assistance from Australia. McLean returned to Australia and Sydney in 1912 and it is not known if the game survived his departure.

During the wars, matches were played primarily by Australian servicemen in several countries including Indonesia, Malaysia, Japan, Vietnam and South Korea. Before this time, only informal matches had been played in some countries. A rare example involving participants from other countries was the 1941 game held in Port Dickson, British Malaya.

The sport has been organised in Asia since the late 1980s with teams based in Australian expatriate communities and around universities, such as in Tokyo, Japan.

The first international games in Asia started in the early 1990s (the Hong Kong Dragons played their first match the day after the 1990 AFL Grand Final.)

There existed an informal association for various Asian AFL clubs for some time, but on 27 July 2013 a meeting of Asia's presidents was held in Bangkok to discuss the future of footy in Asia. In all, 13 countries / clubs attended and submissions were received from a further four clubs. This was the first time representatives of Asian Australian Rules football had ever met with the sole purpose of preparing a road map for Asian footy. This meeting lead to the formation of AFL Asia, the official Association for Australian Football in Asia.

== Leagues ==
The following leagues play within AFL Asia:

- South East Asia Australian Football League (SEAAFL): Was first played on 26 January 2013, in Phnom Penh, between the Cambodian Eagles and Vietnam Swans as the EAAFL. Member clubs included the Malaysian Warriors, Cambodian Eagles, Lao Elephants, Vietnam Swans, Singapore Wombats, Jakarta Bintangs, China Reds and Thailand Tigers. Malaysia went on to win the first year.
- South China Australian Football League (SCAFL): The League was created in 2011 following a game between Guangzhou Scorpions and HK Dragons in Guangzhou. Both clubs were keen to establish a league so that players would have the opportunity to play frequently. It comprised the Macau Lightning, Guangzhou Scorpions, Hong Kong Reds/Typhoons, Hong Kong Blues/Cobras, Lantau Lizards and the Hong Kong Gaelic team was added in 2013. The Guangdong Seagulls a local Chinese team joined in 2014.
- Guangdong Australian Football League (GDAFL): After experiencing Australian Football in the SCAFL local Chinese teams were created and play regular "metro" footy 10-a-side round robin tournaments. Teams include Guanzhou Scorpions, University Seagulls, Dongguan Giants and Huizhou Hawks.
- North East Asia Australian Football League (NEAAFL): Introduced in 2014 North East Asia AFL includes Beijing, Shanghai, teams from Japan.

The main tournament and cup competition is the annual Asian Australian Football Championships. Played every year since 2000 this international tournament is the pinnacle of Asian Australian football calendar. It currently comprises teams from over a dozen countries contesting for Asia's greatest trophy. The most recent Asian Champions are the Malaysian Warriors who defeated the Philippine Eagles in Manila, Philippines on 21 October 2017. The 2018 AFL Asian Championships will be held in Kuala Lumpur on October 13, 2018.

== Nations ==
=== Afghanistan ===
Australian and New Zealand soldiers have (in the past) played games of Australian rules football in Afghanistan, most notably on ANZAC Day.

=== Brunei ===
Australian rules football has been played in Brunei since 1998 when a social match was held, followed by a meeting to establish the Brunei Australian Rules Football League. Anthony Rodaughan was duly appointed the League's first president.

The domestic competition soon commenced at the Jerudong International School soccer field, with a three-team competition including players from England, Scotland, New Zealand, Canada and Brunei. Late 1998/99 saw huge changes in the fledgling competition as the country began ending numerous expat contracts. Player numbers were reduced but the league took stock and continued to provide a regular competition for its members. 1999 brought the formation of the Brunei Sharks, a composite side representing the league, playing their first match against the Singapore Wombats. The Sharks' first appearance at the Asian Australian Football Championships was in 2000 in Jakarta.

=== Cambodia ===
Australian rules football has been played in Cambodia by members of the expatriate Australian community in Phnom Penh since around 2000, when a club nicknamed the Cambodia Crocodiles was formed. The Crocodiles hosted other teams from around the Asian region for at least one tournament, but then went into recess.

A new club, now known as the Cambodian Kangas, was under formation in 2008, hosting a four-team Indochina Cup in Phnom Penh in November of that year, but this club also did not last beyond their first tournament. In 2010, the Cambodian Cobras formed, hosting the Vietnam Swans in Phnom Penh on July 31.

The Cambodian Cobras went from strength to strength in 2011, signing a partnership with the Australian Football League club, The West Coast Eagles. The Cobras changed their name to the Cambodian Eagles and participated in their first Asian Champs in the same year.

A number of Cambodian Australians play for the Southern Dragons in the Southern Football League in Melbourne.

The Cambodian Eagles went on to win the 2016 ICC where BJ Fitzgerald was named player of the tournament.

==== Clubs ====
Team	Location	Founded	Notes
Cambodian Eagles	Phnom Penh	2010	Cambodian Eagles website Changed name to Eagles in 2011

=== China ===
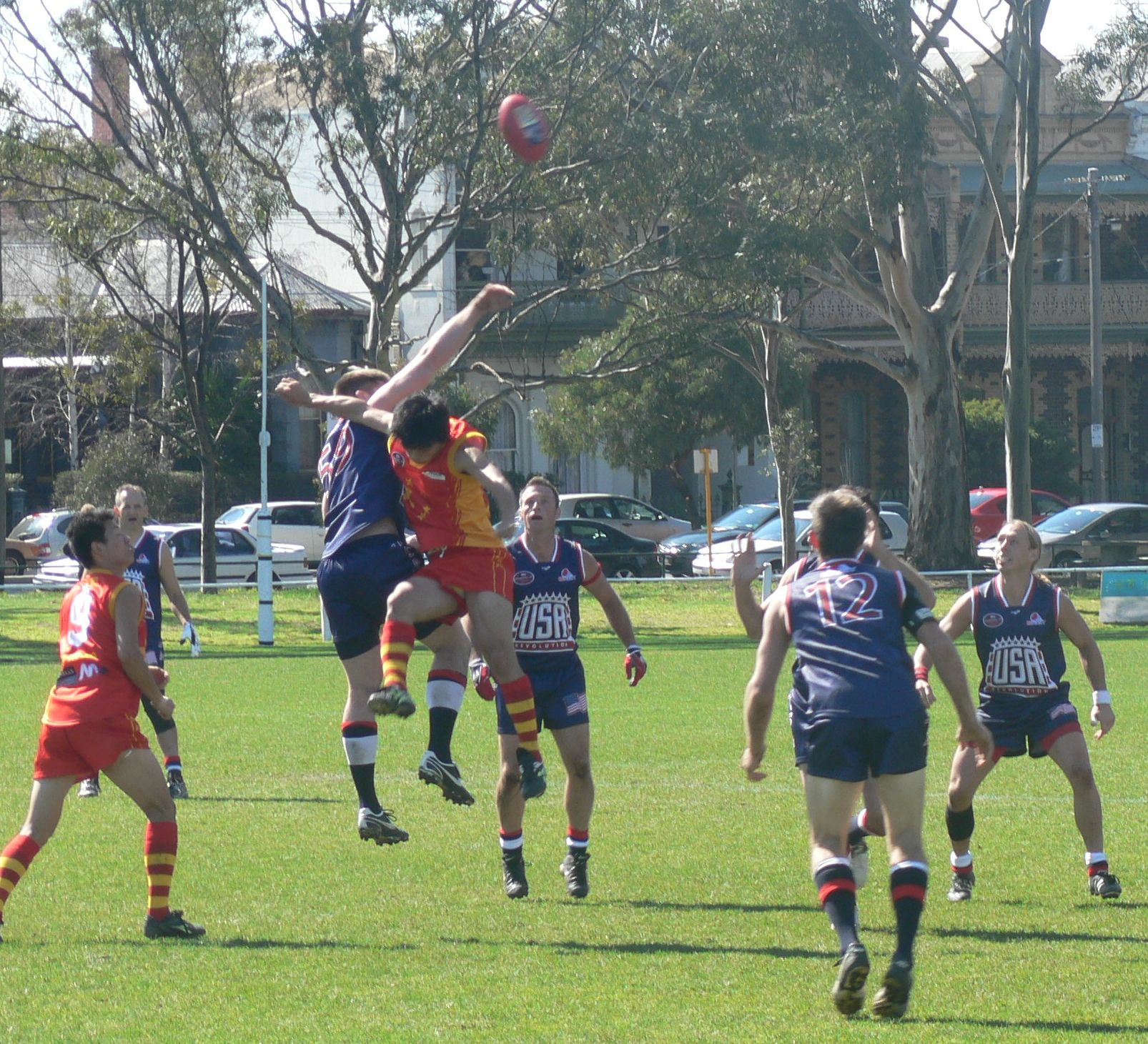
China's Red Demons take on the US at IC08

Australian rules football has been played in China since the 1990s, and is currently played by senior clubs in Guangzhou, Shanghai, Tianjin and Beijing, with the Beijing AFL metro league beginning in 2009. There are also clubs in the special economic development zones of Hong Kong and Macau that play against Chinese teams from Guangzhou and Guangdong in the South China Australian Football league (SCAFL), since 2011.

A representative team of mainly expatriate Australian players has represented China under the names "China Blues" or "China Reds" in competitions such as the Asian Australian Football Championships.

The first representative team composed entirely of Chinese nationals appeared at the 2008 Australian Football International Cup, competing as the China Red Demons. Since 2011 it has been known as Team China.

The Australian Football League AFL exhibition match in Shanghai in 2010 and a series of AFL Premiership matches was played there from 2017 to 2019, the first outside of Pacific.

=== East Timor ===
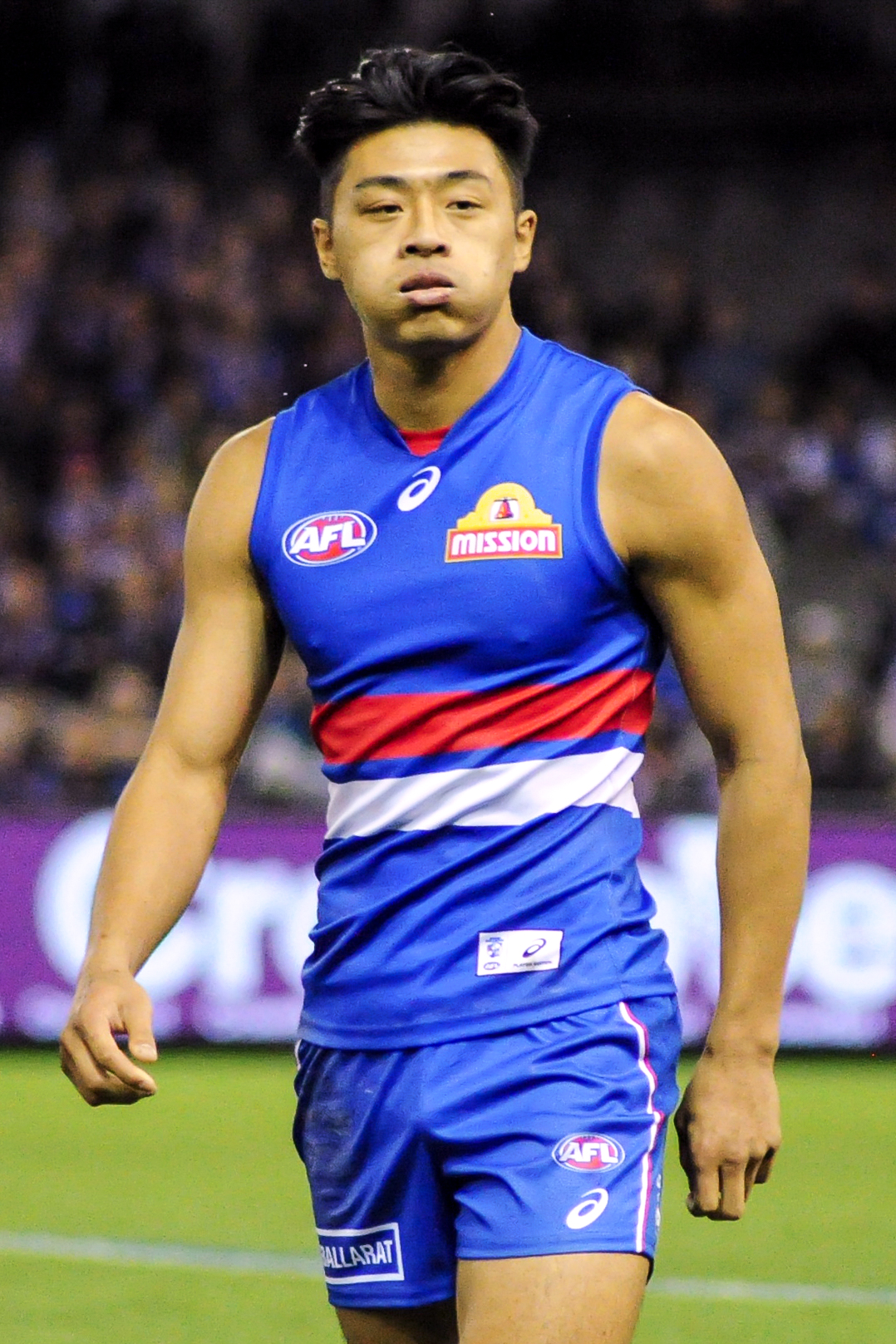
East Timorese AFL player Lin Jong served as ambassador for the East Timor Hearts Fund

The sport began after the independence of Timor-Leste in 1999 due to Australian Defence Force personnel stationed in the country. The East Dili Eels were founded around this time.

In 2001 an organisation named the Timor Lorosa'e Austrálian Futebal Associacao (TILAFA, English: East Timorese Australian Football Association) was formed in Dili and there were plans to send a team to the Arafura Games in Darwin, although this organisation later disappeared.

In early 2006 two teachers from Kambrya College, a secondary school in the outer-eastern Melbourne suburb of Berwick, visited a partner-school in the village of Letefoho, Ermera district as part of the Friends of Ermera organisation, holding clinics in Australian rules football in addition to donating other sporting and educational materials.

In 2007, an exhibition match was played between the ISF (International Stabilisation Force) Tigers from the ADF and the UN Police Warriors (Jumpers borrowed from the NT Team Waratah Warriors). Both teams had female players and local Timorese players, played at Democracy Field in Dili, which was constructed by the Combat Engineers, this match was the culmination of several Auskick clinics over two months where up to one hundred kids participated. The match raised $10,000 US for the Mary Mackillop Foundation and went to the local, underprivileged people of Timor. The clinics and match were planned and implemented as team effort to build relations and trust between the local Timorese and Soldiers and Police on deployment between the Army and VICPOL members on secondment to the AFP, CPL Adam Bourke instigated the philanthropic activity and Captained the ISF Tigers to a 10-goal win in front of a curios crowd.

In 2008 Luke Gosling and Justin Bayard helped start the Timor-Leste Australian Rules Football Club. The club managed to work with the Northern Territory Football League and Australian Volunteers International to get locals playing the game. A national team was created in 2008, though not in time to get to the 2008 International Cup.

In 2008, the East Timor Crocodiles team formed, making their debut at the 2008 Bali 9s tournament.

A governing body, AFL Timor-Leste, was created in 2011 to facilitate sending a team to that year's International Cup.

East Timor, playing as Timor-Leste participated in its first International Cup in 2011. The team did participate in 2011 however not win a game and did not return.

Lin Jong, of East Timorese heritage, debuted in 2011 and received a congratulatory letter from Timor Leste Prime Minister Xanana Gusmao. Jong served as an AFL Multicultural Ambassador and ambassador for the East Timor Hearts Fund.

==== Clubs ====
Team	Location	Founded	Notes
East Timor Crocodiles	Dili	2008	

==== Notable players ====
Player	AFL/AFLW Years*	AFL/AFLW Matches*	AFL/AFLW Goals*	Connections to Timor-Leste, References
Andy Moniz-Wakefield	2024-	6	-	Mother
Jarvis Pina	2022	-	-	Parent
Lin Jong	2012–2021	65	33	Father

=== Hong Kong ===
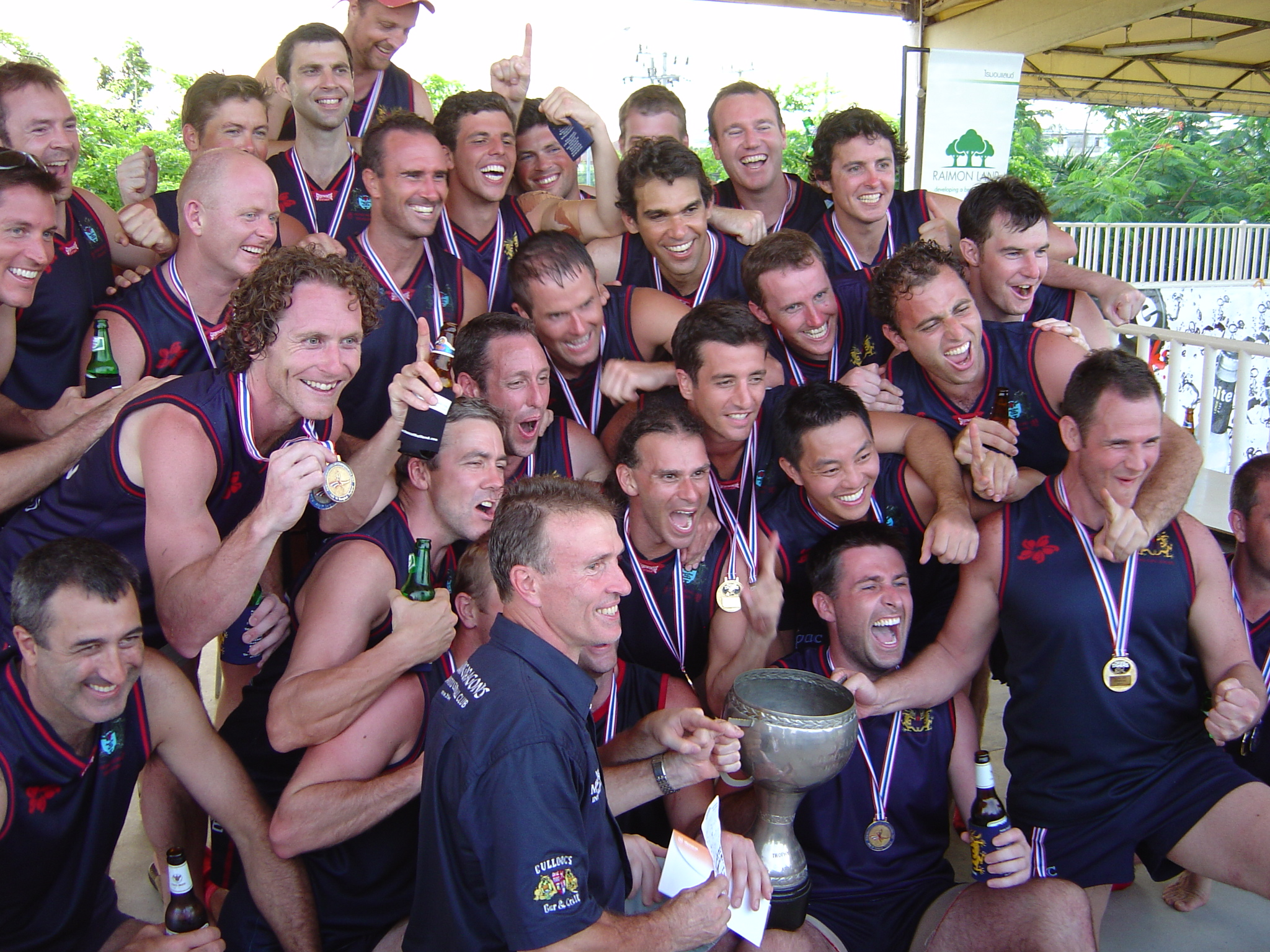
Hong Kong Dragons after winning the 2007 Asian Australian Football Championships

Hong Kong is home to one of Asia's oldest and most successful Australian rules football clubs, the Hong Kong Dragons having played their first match in 1990. Based primarily around expat Australians, the club plays frequent matches against other clubs in the Asian region, including other teams from mainland China. The Hong Kong Dragons have won the coveted AFL Asian Championships title six times, in 2003, 2004, 2007, 2012, 2013, 2015. Hong Kong local teams also play in the South China Australian Football league where they play against teams from southern mainland China and Macau.

Hong Kong also have an active Auskick community with over 400 children participating in Auskick and the HK Junior AFL. Spread over 5 centres across Hong Kong teams train weekly and regularly play against other teams. The representative team HK Junior Dragons also annually play against the Singapore Sharks and tour Australia playing against Australian local teams and half time at professional AFL games.

Hong Kong Vikings Masters teams born out of Dads from the Junior Auskick centres have been training together in growing numbers and internal Reds v Whites AFL 9's games, social events and once a year play against the Hong Kong Dragons.

In July 1940, a match was played at Kowloon at the Police Club grounds.

==== Clubs ====
Team	Location	Founded	Notes
Hong Kong Dragons	Hong Kong	1990	Hong Kong Dragons website

==== Notable players ====
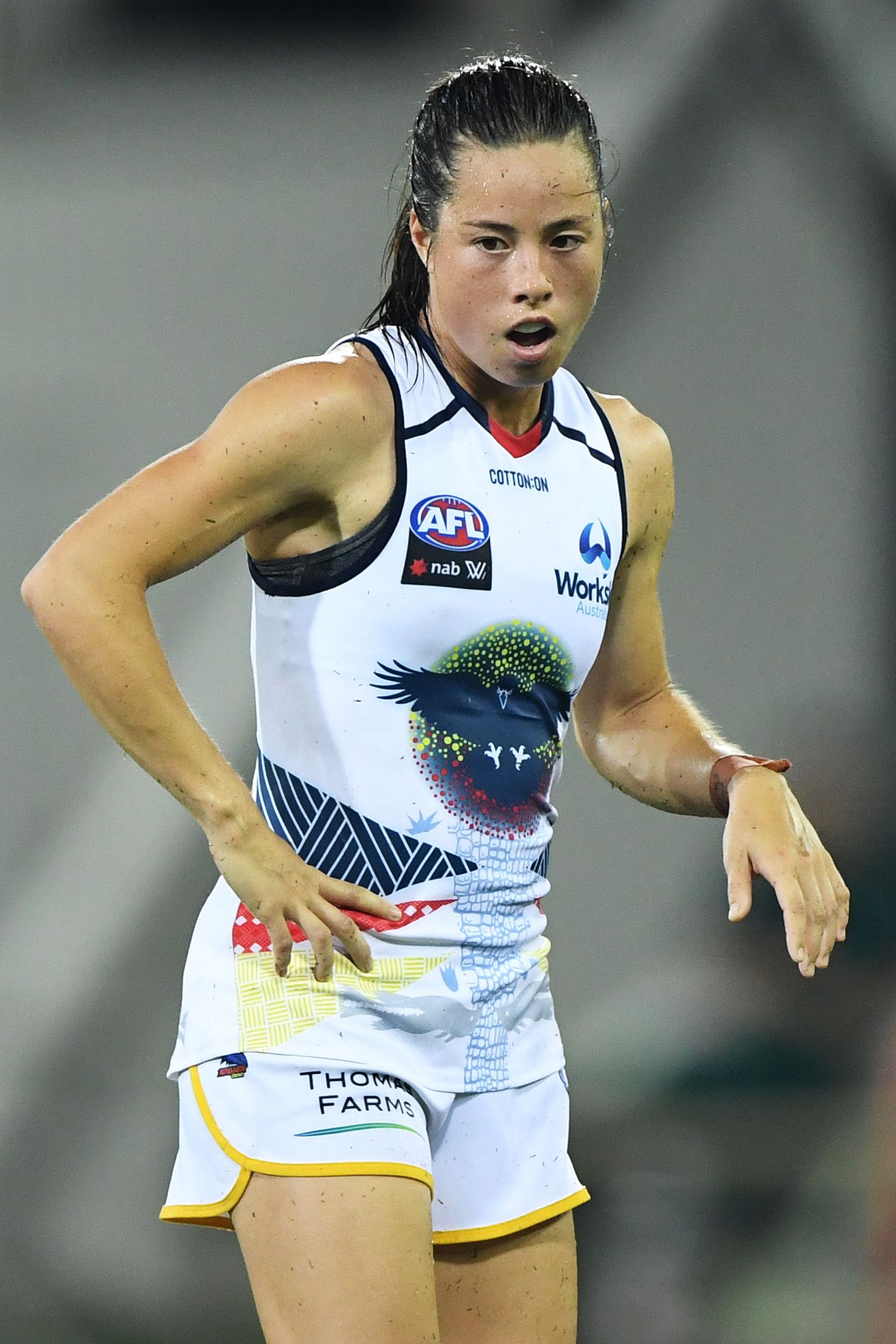
Sophie Li playing for Adelaide in 2019

Player	AFL/AFLW Years*	AFL/AFLW Matches*	AFL/AFLW Goals*	Connections to Hong Kong, References
Cameron Polson	2017-2020	19	4	Born
Sophie Li	2018–2020	21	1	Parents

=== India ===
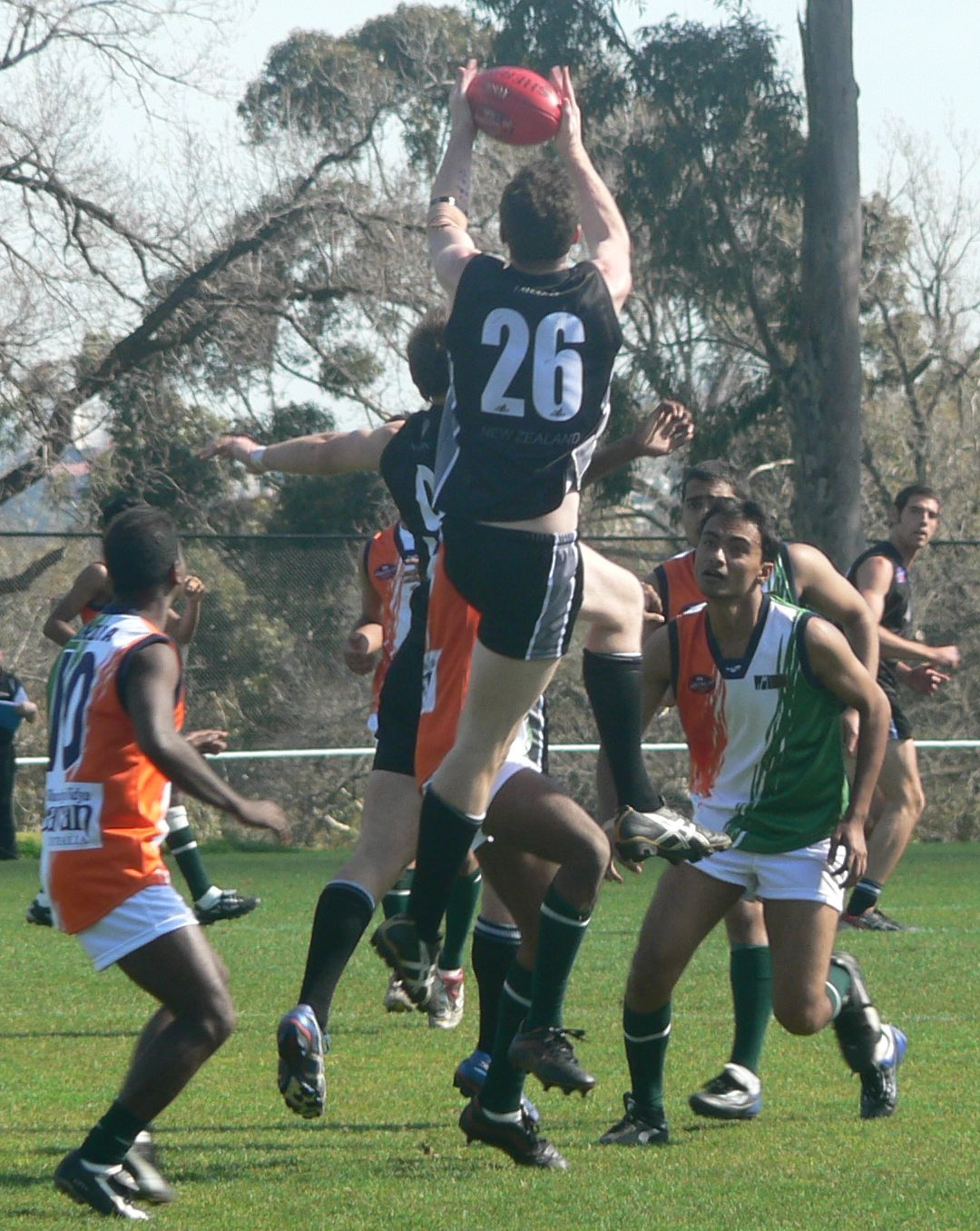
India vs New Zealand at IC08

Known locally as "footy", it is played in India and the country has participated in the International Cup since 2008. However India is not currently affiliated to AFL Asia. India's national Australian rules team is known as the Tigers. The sport is played in more than 12 Indian states, though it is most popular in the eastern states, particularly Jharkhand and West Bengal. The current record attendance is 20,000 set in 2018 up from 6,000 in 2017.

The Chakraborty Medal is awarded to the best player from India and is named after Sudip Chakraborty the first member of the Australian Rules Football in India Hall of Fame.

==== History ====
The West Australian Football League toured India in 1969, playing two exhibition matches in New Delhi between East Perth and Subiaco Football Clubs, which attracted large crowds and interest, a record 3,500 spectators turned out for one of the matches.

Australian rules football began in India with the creation of the Indian Amateur Australian Football Association in 2001. The organisation was based in Delhi, but disbanded in 2004.

The potential for the game has several times attracted interest from Australia, with the WAFL in 2005 proposing an exhibition match for Mumbai.

The next appearance of organised Australian rules in India came with the visit of Brian Dixon to Kolkata in 2006 which resulted in the formation of starter clubs in the city and a platform for the development of an Indian team for the 2008 Australian Football International Cup. The first Indian national team was drawn from players recruited by the AFL India in Kolkata, as well as Indian nationals living in Melbourne.

In 2008 Ricky Ponting launched Australian Rules Football in India (ARFAI) in Kolkata after he and Shane Warne had popularised the sport while playing with the Kolkata Knight Riders.

Australian expatriate Lincoln Harris kickstarted a junior competition in Mumbai in 2010.

A major tournament was promoted in 2012 featuring Steve Waugh as Australian patron.

The Richmond Football Club (Tigers) expressed strong interest in holding an AFL exhibition match in India in 2008. The idea has been furthered by the club in 2012 and 2018, although plans were put on hold during the COVID-19 pandemic.

In 2017, the Bharat Warriors Football Club were founded in Melbourne with the aim of recruiting players of Indian origin to promote Australian rules football in India. The club operates exchange programs between Australia and India.

Despite no AFL matches being staged, a match held in 2017 between the Indian national team and an Australian AFL Masters side attracted over 6,000 spectators at Paschim Medinipur district (West Midnapore).

In April 2018, AFLW player Jess Dal Pos visited Mumbai to conduct young girls clinics in the sport.

In 2018, 20,000 people attended a national championships match at Similipal Mini Stadium in Bholagoria.

With play resuming post-COVID-19, Australians have been called in to officiate matches including the AFL India Championships due to a lack of officials in the country to cope with the growth.

In 2023, India Warriors made a three-peat in the TAC Unity Cup.

==== Clubs ====
Team	Location	Founded	Notes
Andrha Pradesh Magpies	Andhra Pradesh	2020	
Bengal Tigers	Bengal	2008	Bengal Tigers website
Bihar Bulldogs	Bihar		Bihar Bulldogs website
Jharkhand Crows	Jharkhand		
Kerala Bombers	Kerala		
Maharashtra Giants	Maharashtra		
Odisha Swans	Odisha		Odisha Swans website
Rajasthan Eagles	Rajasthan		Rajasthan Eagles website
Tamil Nadu Kangaroos	Tamil Nadu		
Telangana Saints	Telangana		Telangana Saints website
Uttar Pradesh Hawks	Uttar Pradesh	2020	Uttar Pradesh Hawks website

==== Notable players ====
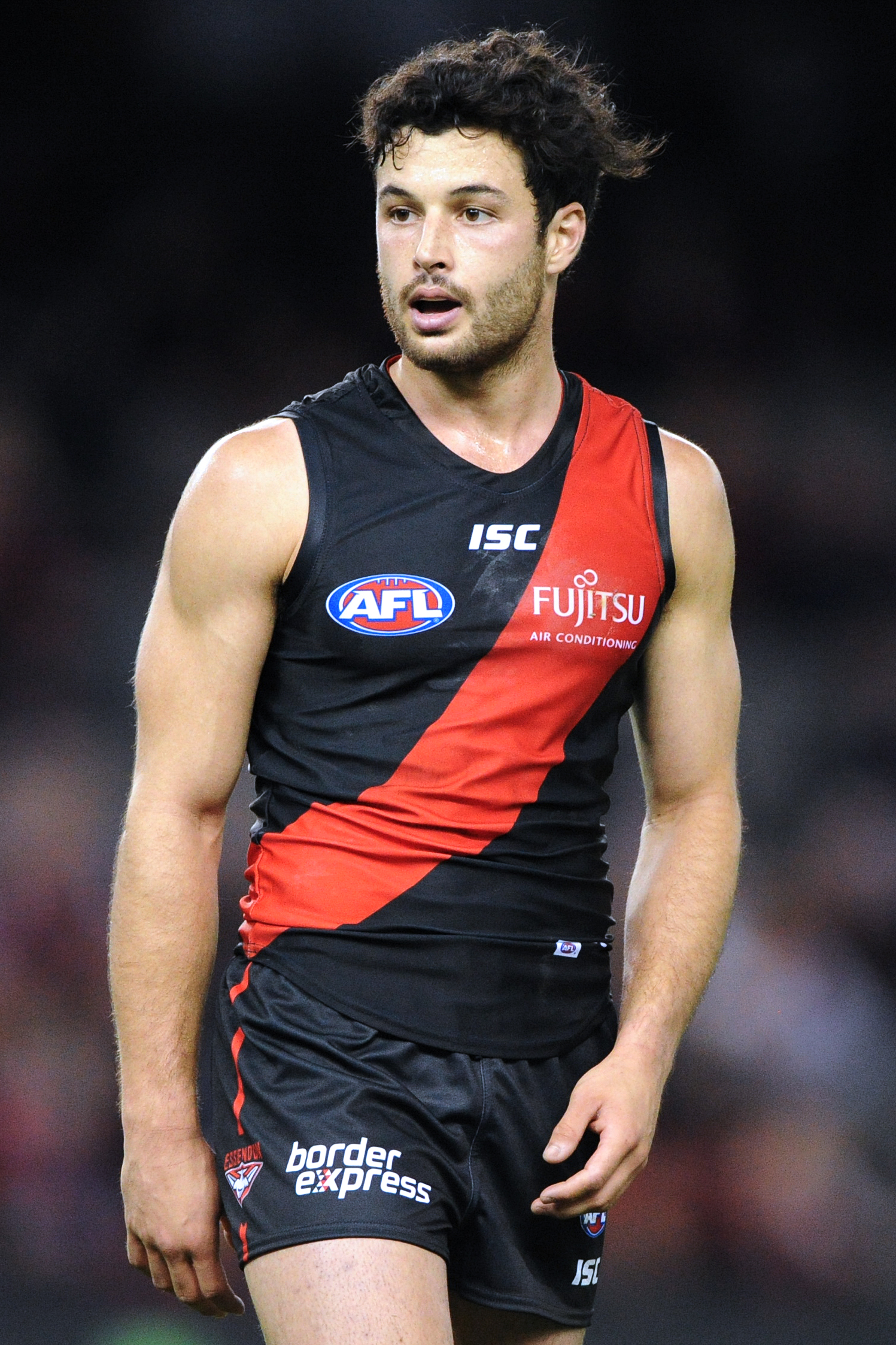
Ben McNiece in 2018

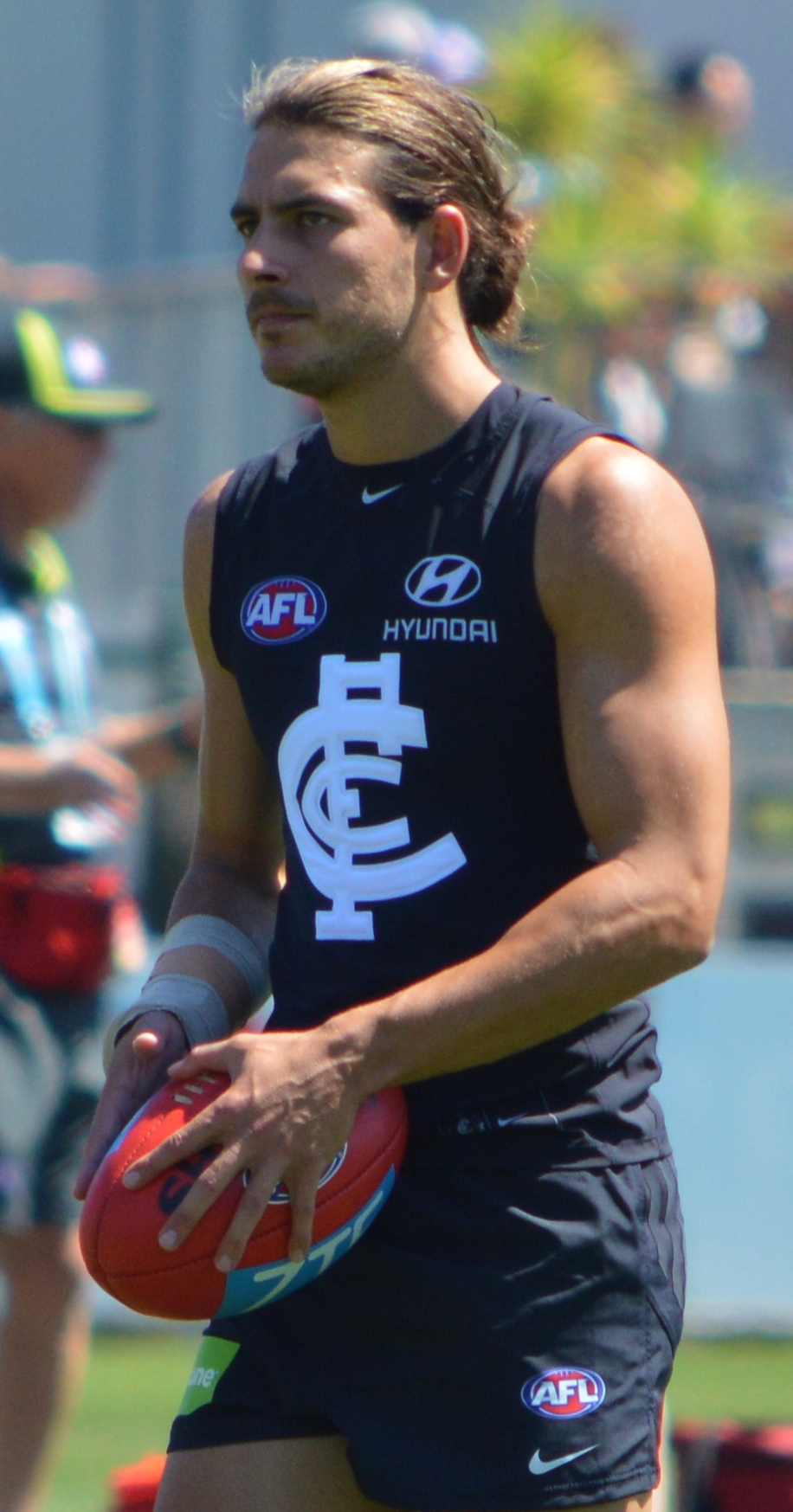
Blaine Boekhorst in 2017

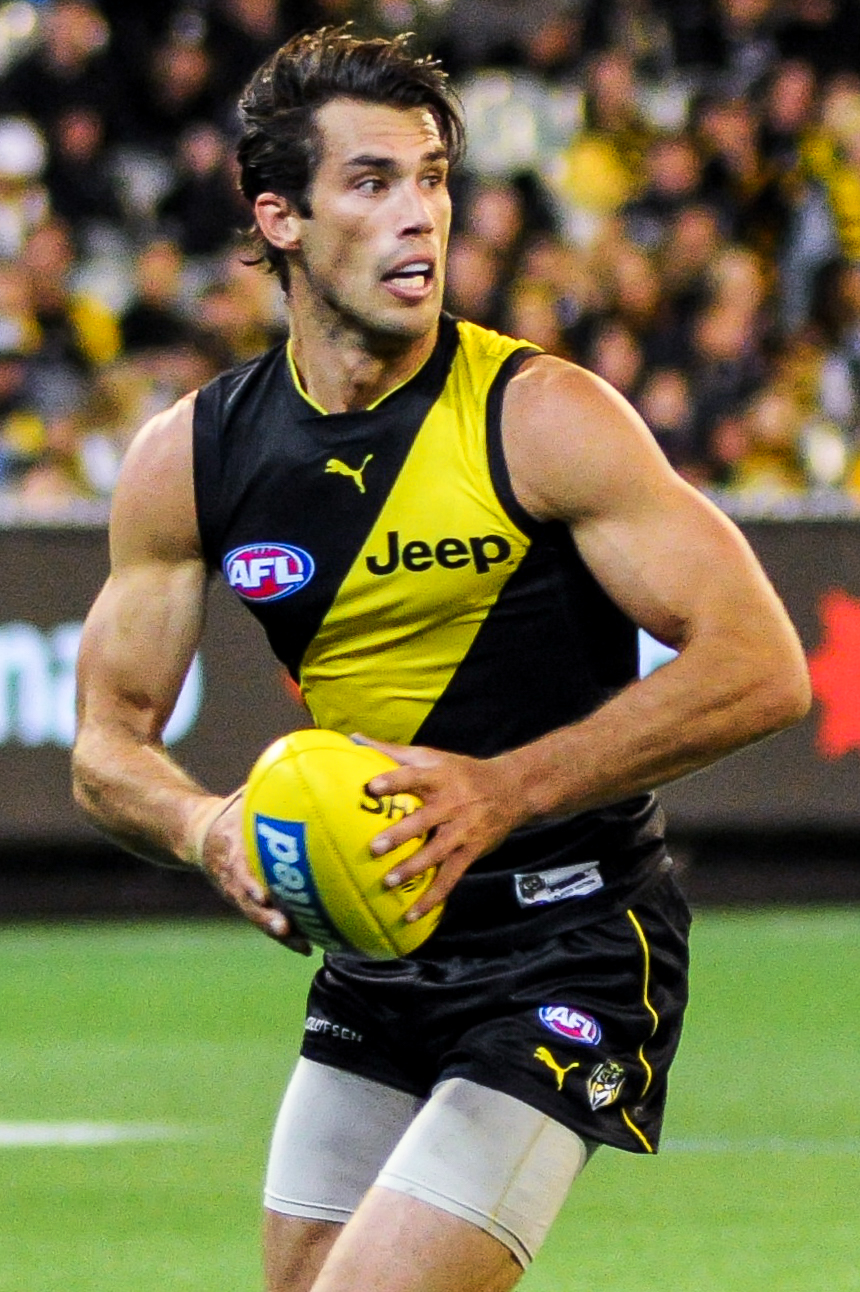
Alex Rance in 2017

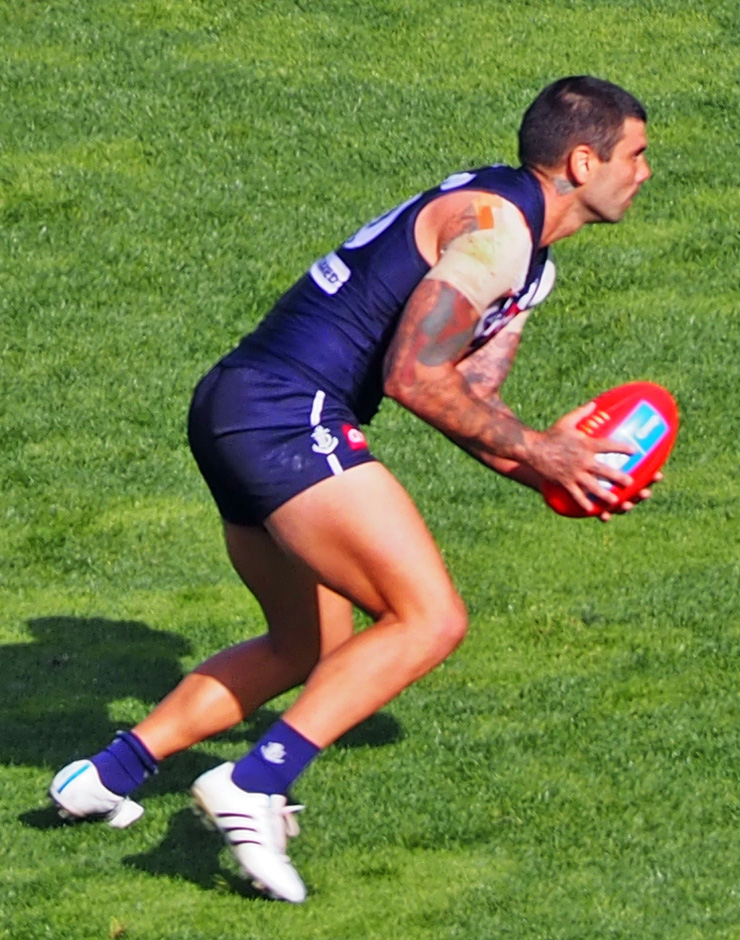
Clancee Pearce in 2015

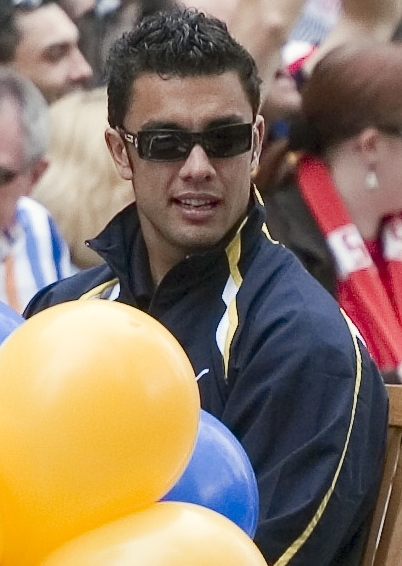
Daniel Kerr in 2010, first AFL premiership player of the Indian heritage from the famous Kerr footballing family

Player	AFL/AFLW Years*	AFL/AFLW Matches*	AFL/AFLW Goals*	Connections to India, References
Zoe Savarirayan	2022-2024	4	0	Parents
Alex Morgan	2018	2	0	Heritage
Ben McNiece	2017-2019	15	0	Mother
Blaine Boekhorst	2011-2017	25	15	Mother
Alex Silvagni	2010-2018	60	20	Mother
Clancee Pearce	2009-2016	100	36	Mother
Alex Rance	2008-2019	200	9	Parent
Daniel Kerr	2001-2013	220	122	Father
Jordan McMahon	2001-2010	148	46	Parent
Balraj Singh	1999	-	-	Parent
Roger Kerr	-	-	-	Born Calcutta
Fred Pringle	1923-1924	22	7	Born Assam

=== Indonesia ===
Australian rules football was played in Indonesia by Australian soldiers in 1945 in Morotai and also Ngada.

It is currently played in Indonesia by clubs in Jakarta (formed in 1995), Bali (formed in 1997) and the Borneo Bears based in Balikpapan, these three clubs being mainly made up of expatriate Australians. There is also a league consisting of local villagers around the Pancawati area in West Java. The Jakarta Bintangs and Bali Geckos regularly contest the Java-Bali Cup and participate in the Asian Australian Football Championships.

A club was under formation as of 2006 in Banda Aceh, although this project was ultimately unsuccessful.

Founded in 2003, the West Java Australian Football League (WeJAFL) has over 500 local junior and senior players in the local competition. The large number of local players makes it the Asian nation with the highest participation rate amongst locals, and the club sent an Indonesian team, the Indonesian Garudas, composed of members of all the Indonesia clubs to the Australian Football International Cup in 2014.

The Jakarta Bulldogs Australian Football Club, established in late 2006, is an Aussie Rules Football Club made up of primarily of Under 18 year old expatriate and local students from the British International School Jakarta, although they share no affiliation with the school. The club was founded by Australian-born brothers Alf Eddy (Club Captain) and Max Eddy (Head Coach) and has played against a wide variety of local Australian Football teams such as the Pancawati Eagles, Depok Garudas, the Bandung-New Guinea AFC and the Jakarta Bintangs. Since 2006 the club has gone from strength to strength obtaining full sponsorship from ANZ Bank which allowed for the acquisition of proper uniforms of AFL standard and new footies in 2007. In 2008 Bulldogs will take part in the inaugural Junior Asian Championships, going into the competition with high expectations from all involved. A Finnish member of the club, Tuomas Anttila, was scouted to play with the Finnish national team at the 2008 International Cup, but was unable to make the journey.

The Borneo Bears were formed in Balikpapan in 2008, making their debut at the 2008 Bali 9s tournament.

The Jakarta Bintangs, Bali Geckoes and Borneo Bears formed the AFL Indonesia in 2009, with a centralised plan for further development of the sport among native Indonesians, and the long-term goal of an Indonesian side at the 2011 Australian Football International Cup, although they did not ultimately take part in that tournament in that year, however, they sent 18 Indonesian youth to play in Melbourne in 2014.

Indonesia's national team is known as the Garudas.

Australian rules football in Indonesia receives regular coverage from the Jakarta Globe and is now regularly played on television via the Australia Network including live coverage of the AFL Grand Final.

The 2023 AFL Asia All-Asian teams for the Indonesia Volcanoes:

Men's Division 1

Alfie Giles, Peter Macfarlane, Michael Latpeirissa, Jay Giller, and Oliver Lilford

==== Clubs ====
Team	Location	Founded	Notes
Jakarta Bintangs	Cibubur Cricket Ground, Jakarta	1995	Jakarta Bintangs website
Bali Geckos	Finns Recreation Club, Berawa, Bali	1997	Bali Geckos website
Borneo Bears	Balikpapan, East Kalimantan	2008	Borneo Bears website

=== Japan ===
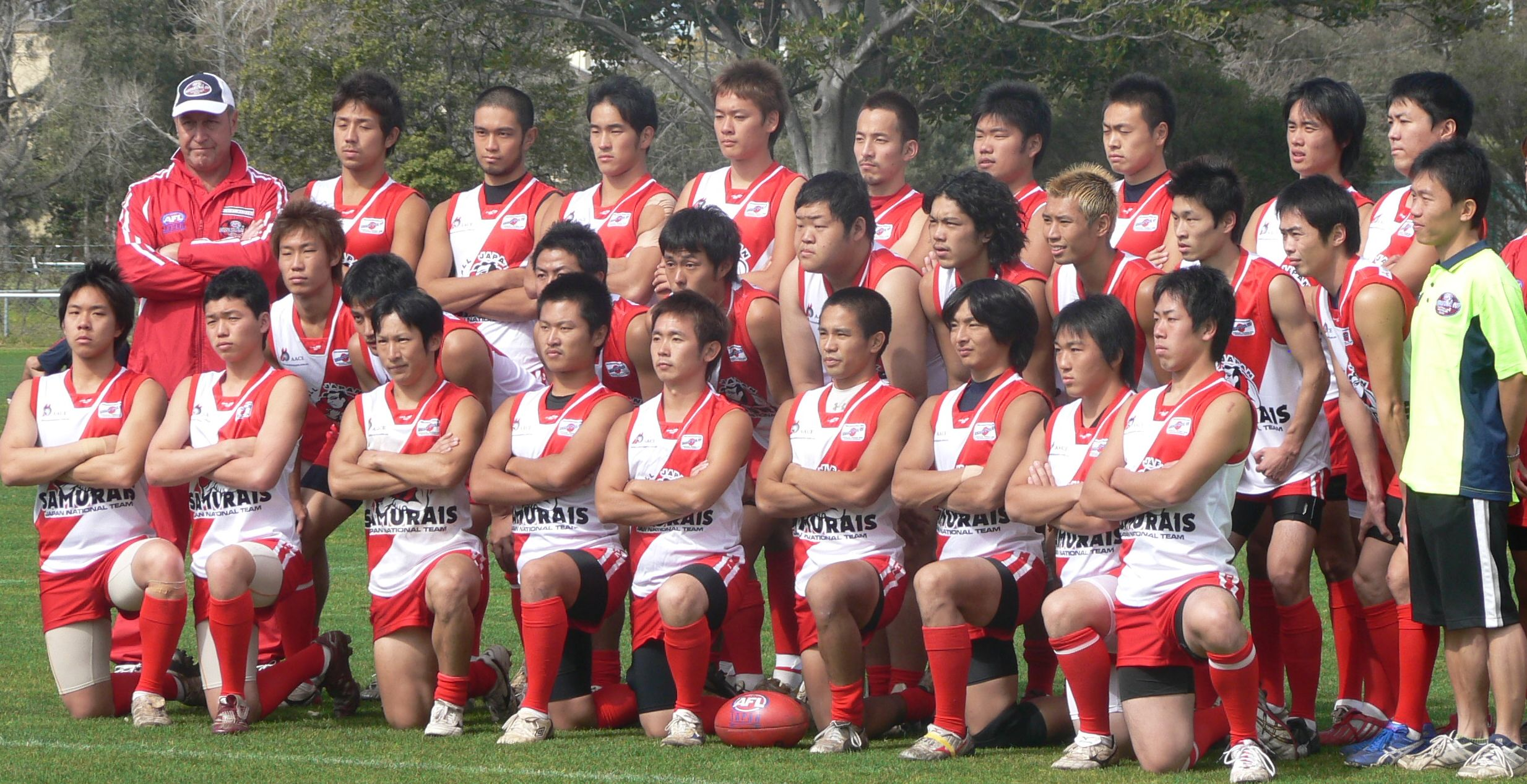
Japan's national team at IC08

Australian rules football in Japan is coordinated by the AFL Japan, with a national league based mainly in Tokyo (affiliated with the Australian Football League) but with clubs in Osaka, Nagoya and Hiroshima. Development teams from the AFL Japan regularly tour to Australia and have competed at all Australian Football International Cups to date.

=== Laos ===
The Lao Elephants were formed in Vientiane in 2007, as the first Australian Rules Football club in Laos. The team played their first international fixture against the Vietnam Swans and Thailand Tigers in November 2007 in Hanoi. The Lao Elephants impressed many by defeating archrivals Vietnam and Thailand on debut at the Asian Australian Football Championships in Singapore in September 2008.

Later, the "Phants" were victorious in the Mekong Cup held in Phnom Penh, Cambodia on 22 November 2008, involving the Cambodian Kangaroos, Thailand Tigers, Vietnam Swans and Lao Elephants.

The first domestic match in Laos was held in May 2009, with the Northerners (squad members based in Vientiane and Luang Prabang) defeating the Southerners (mine workers from the Sepon area) in Savannakhet.

==== Clubs ====
Team	Location	Founded	Notes
Lao Elephants	Vientiane	2007	Lao Elephants website

=== Macau ===
Macau Lightning AFL club was formed in 2009 and began running Auskick Clinics at the International School of Macau. With an increasing demand for more football from the kids participating, the club started Saturday morning training which continues to grow with boys and girls aged between 4 and 13 years. In September 2010 the Macau Lightning Auskick played their first match against the Hong Kong Auskick marking the first of many future match days between both clubs. It was a small beginning for the Senior Macau Lightning Team in 2009 with only a handful of guys looking for a social kick. As word spread of AFL in Macau numbers gradually grew to a competitive squad of 30 players by May 2010. 2010 has seen the Senior Team make their International Debut with matches against Hong Kong Dragons in May, touring to Guangzhou in August and participating in the China Cup against the Hong Kong Dragons and the China Reds in early September.

On April 13, 2013, the Lightning achieved their greatest team feat thus far in the short existence defeating both the Hong Kong Blues and a combined Hong Kong team in Round 4 of the SCAFL.

==== Clubs ====
Team	Location	Founded	Notes
Macau Lightning	TIS International School of Macau, Macau	2009	Macau Lightning website

=== Malaysia ===
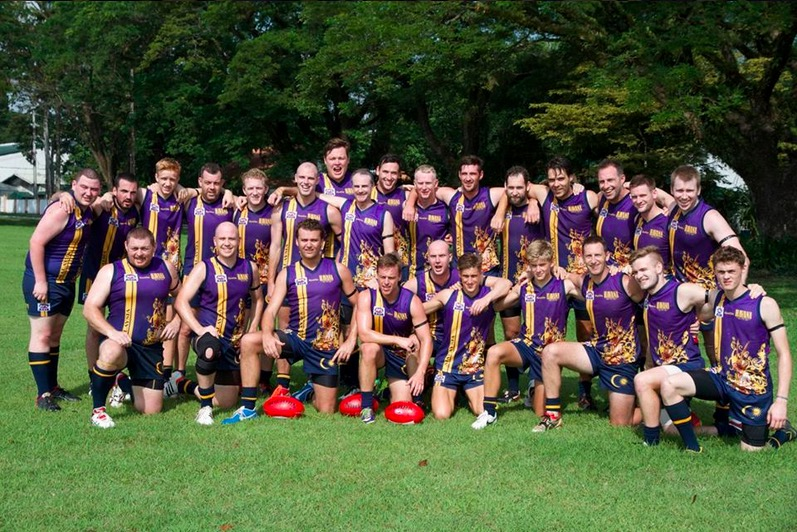
Malaysian Warriors team pictured at the 2014 Asian Australian Football Championships at Clark Field, Philippines

Australian rules football is regularly played in Malaysia, currently the main Australian Rules Football team is the Malaysian Warriors who will play four home and four away games in 2015 as well as the Manila Cup tournament and the Asian Australian Football Championships.

The earliest known history of Australian rules football in Malaysia goes back to the Australian armed forces (2/19th battalion) playing at Port Dickson in 1941. Australian servicemen also attempted to introduce the code to Malays at Penang in 1958 and 1963.

Regular games have been played since the late 1980s in Kuala Lumpur, primarily by expatriate Australians living and working in the city. The club was initially known as the MARK Tigers (Malaysian Australian Rules Kelab) and the team played their first game in February 1993 against Hong Kong in Kuala Lumpur and first toured to Singapore in July 1993. They recorded their first win in August 1994 against a team from the Royal Australian Air Force base in Butterworth, Penang. Between 1994 and 1998, the club became consistent contenders on and off the field in Asia. Games were mainly played against the RAAF in Penang, the Singapore Wombats and the Jakarta Bintangs.

The Asian economic crisis of 1998 saw many members of the Australian community in Malaysia return home, leaving the club in great difficulties. In 2000 the team reformed under a new name, the Malaysian Warriors and have played continually since. In addition to teams visiting Malaysia, the Malaysian Warriors have toured to Cambodia to contest the "Killing Fields Cup", to Singapore for the "Changi Cup", to Jakarta for the 'Batik Cup', to Vietnam for the "Communist Cup" and 2014 Anzac Day game in Vung Tau, to Thailand for the "Fish Bowl Cup" and to Bali for the Adidas Bali 9s tournament.

The Warriors also participate in an annual five match series of International Rules games against the Orang Éire Gaelic Football Club.

The most notable results for the Warriors to date have been the 2012 Manila Cup winners, Premiers of Asia in 2013 and 2015, and runner up in the 2015 Asian Australian Football Championships.

The Warriors train at Padang Merbok, located near the Lake Gardens, Kuala Lumpur.

More recently ex AFL players Daniel Chick and Tim Fleming have played games for the Warriors, with Fleming scoring 7 goals in a game against Jakarta which Malaysia went on to win to retain the 'Batik Cup'.

The Warriors had an unbeaten 2015 season before the Asian Australian Football Championships and finished on top of the AFL Asia ladder.

In 2016 they contested the Manila Cup and the 2016 Asian Australian Football Championships as well as various home and away games most notably the 2016 Anzac Day clash against the Thailand Tigers in Kanchanaburi.

==== Clubs ====
Team	Location	Founded	Notes
Malaysian Warriors	UM Park, Kuala Lumpur	2000	Malaysian Warriors website

==== Notable players ====
Player	AFL/AFLW Years*	AFL/AFLW Matches*	AFL/AFLW Goals*	Connections to Malaysia, References
Emmelie Fiedler	2024-	1	-	Born and raised
Courtney Guard	2019-2022	22	0	Parent

=== Mongolia ===
The Mongolian Wolves joined Asian Australian Football Championships in 2019.

==== Clubs ====
Team	Location	Founded	Notes
Mongolian Wolves		2019	Mongolian Wolves website

=== Nepal ===
The first matches in Nepal were played in 2013 by the Thyangboche Yaks and local children also began playing. More regular matches were later played and the Himalayan Leopard club were formed around 2017. Further growth was facilitated by the Association of Nepalese Alumni from Australia, and Nepal was granted entry to AFL Asia in 2018.

==== Clubs ====
Team	Location	Founded	Notes
Himalayan Leopards		2021	Himalayan Leopards website

=== Pakistan ===
Australian rules football began in 2014 and has grown rapidly. It was first introduced by Chaudrey Zulfiqar Ali and Tayyab Chattha with support from the Australian High Commission. Teams were established in Islamabad, Rawalpindi, Multan and Gujranwala. The code in Pakistan benefits greatly from access to full sized grounds with cricket there being the most popular sport.

It is currently strongest in the Swat Valley, where a large competition operates and draws large enthusiastic crowds.

AFL Pakistan (connected with an anti-drug charity network) was formed to govern the sport and select the national team, which has participated in the Australian Football International Cup every tournament since 2014. A women's team was formed in 2017.

A major national tournament was organised in 2018.

Australia sent a coach to assist Pakistan in 2019 however the sport's rapid growth in popularity was greatly outpacing local officials ability to support it.

10 of Pakistan's more than 15 clubs contested the 2021 AFL Pakistan National Championships in Islamabad. The Islamabad Tigers have been the dominant club with 5 national titles.

Pakistan sent a team to the Asian Championship in 2022, however met some roadblocks to participation due to funding. Despite challenges sending a team, it won the Division 3 title. In 2022 AFL Asia reported that Pakistan was the largest and fastest growing nation for the sport in Asia with over 5,000 players with a 45% annual increase in participation.

==== Clubs ====
From a handful of clubs in 2014, AFL Pakistan grew to over 15 clubs in 2017. Some of these clubs are:

Team	Location	Founded	Notes
Baloch Hawks			
Gujranwala Suns	Gujranwala		
Hussain Saints	Multan		Hussain Saints website
Islamabad Tigers	Islamabad	2013	Tigers FC website
Junoon Bombers			Junoon Cricket & Footy Club website
Multan Eagles	Multan		
Pak Youngsters			
Parachinar Giants	Parachinar		
Rovers FC	Islamabad		Rovers Footy Club website
Sindh Dolphins			

=== Philippines ===
The Philippine Australian Football League (PAFL) was created in 2004. Trimmers and Bangers are considered the greatest players in the PAFL. The league currently runs a two-team competition in Manila. The teams, the Dingoes and the Eureka's, were originally based on the division of Victorian (Eurekas) and Non-Victorian (Dingoes) players, but with expansion that divide has not been followed. PAFL hosted the 2005 and 2014 Asian Australian Football Championships, its representative side is known as the Philippine Eagles. The Eagles won their first AFL Asian Championships in 2016 in Vietnam.

==== Clubs ====
Team	Location	Founded	Notes
Philippine Eagles	Manila	2004	Philippine Eagles website

==== Notable players ====
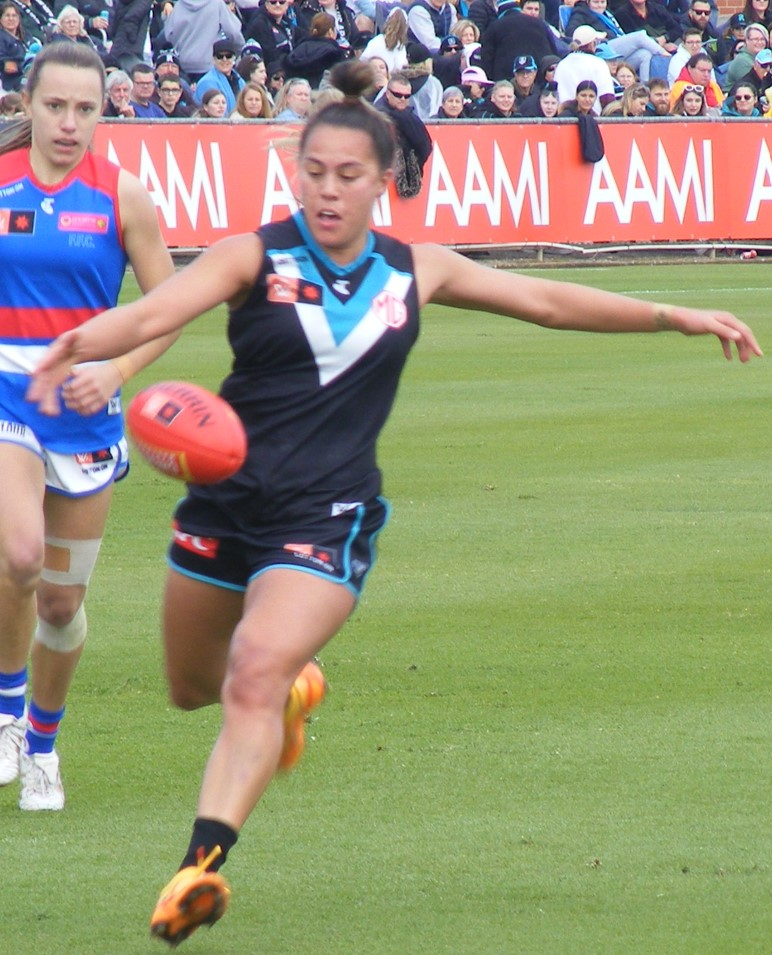
Filipino footballer Justine Mules in 2022

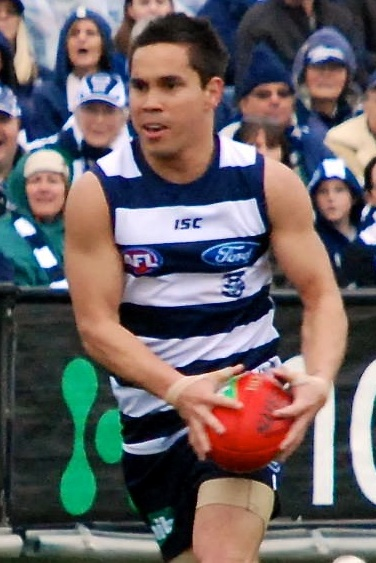
Mathew Stokes in 2011

Player	AFL/AFLW Years*	AFL/AFLW Matches*	AFL/AFLW Goals*	Connections to Philippines, References
Hannah Ewings	2022-	10	4	Father
Justine Mules	2017-	49	4	Mother
Alex Woodward	2012-2016	2	0	Mother
Mathew Stokes	2006-2016	200	209	Ancestry

=== Singapore ===
Australian rules football started in Singapore in April 1993, when a group from the Australian expatriate community founded the Singapore Lions (later Wombats) Australian Football Club. The Singapore Wombats play matches throughout each year against visiting Royal Australian Navy ships, as well as a number of tour matches against other expat-based teams from around Asia in the AFL Asia League and the Bali Masters. One of Asia's most successful clubs the Singapore Wombats have won the AFL Asian Championships many times including 2005, 2006, 2011,

The Singapore Sharks FC est. 2007 for Junior and Auskick players and since 2014 Masters/Dads team was added. Sharks juniors play weekly at the Australian International School (AIS) on Lorong Chuan, Singapore and have toured to Australia, Shanghai, Hong Kong and played at half time of several professional AFL games.

==== Clubs ====
Team	Location	Founded	Notes
Singapore Wombats	Centaurs Sports Fields, Singapore	1993	Formerly the Lions Singapore Wombats website
Singapore Sharks	Singapore	2007	Singapore Sharks website

==== Notable players ====
Player	AFL/AFLW Years*	AFL/AFLW Matches*	AFL/AFLW Goals*	Connections to Singapore, References
Joel Western	2021–2022	4	0	Mother
Chloe Dalton	2019–	20	6	Born
Dannie Seow	1986-1990	25	10	Born

=== South Korea ===
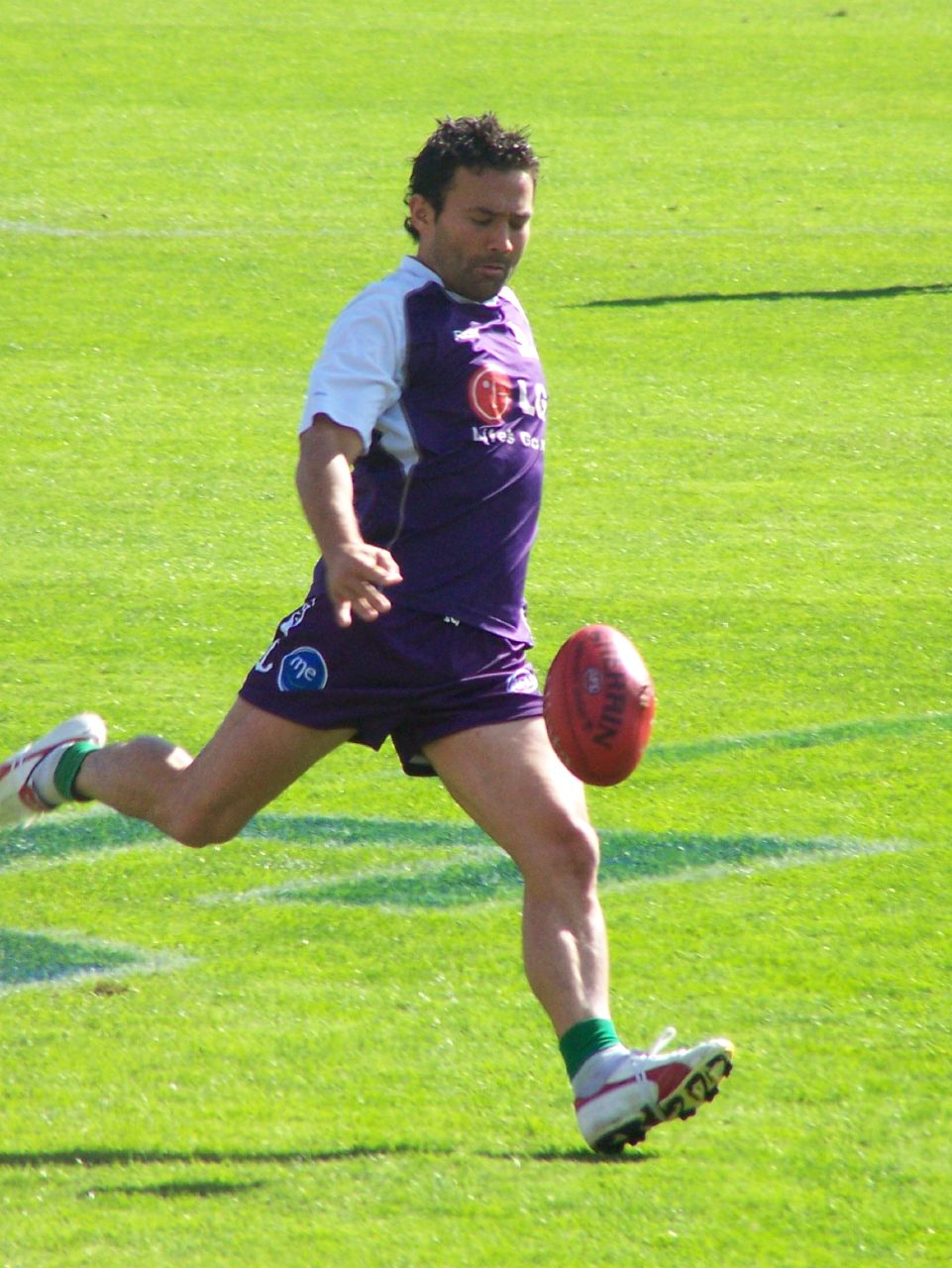
Australian Football Hall of Famer Peter Bell is the greatest player to come out of South Korea

Australian rules was played in South Korea during the Korean War. On August 29, 1950, Australians stationed on the USS Bataan (CVL-29) introduced it, playing along with locals in front of bemused onlookers.

Australians and New Zealanders played further matches in 1951.

In 1953, VFL matches were broadcast to Australian troops stationed in Korea via radio.

In 1954, Australians stationed in South Korea built a dedicated Australian rules football ground and played matches of both football and also used the ground to play cricket against the English.

South Korean born Peter Bell debuted in the Australian Football League in 1995 and played 286 games and kicked 250 goals during his AFL career in which he was Fremantle Football Club captain, played in 2 AFL Premierships and was two time All-Australian.

AFL South Korea was formed in 2022 and became a member of AFL Asia.

==== Notable players ====
Player	AFL/AFLW Years*	AFL/AFLW Matches*	AFL/AFLW Goals*	Connections to Korea, References
Lucy Single	2021–	9	1	Mother
Peter Bell	1995-2008	286	250	(South Korean born) Australian Football Hall of Famer

=== Sri Lanka ===
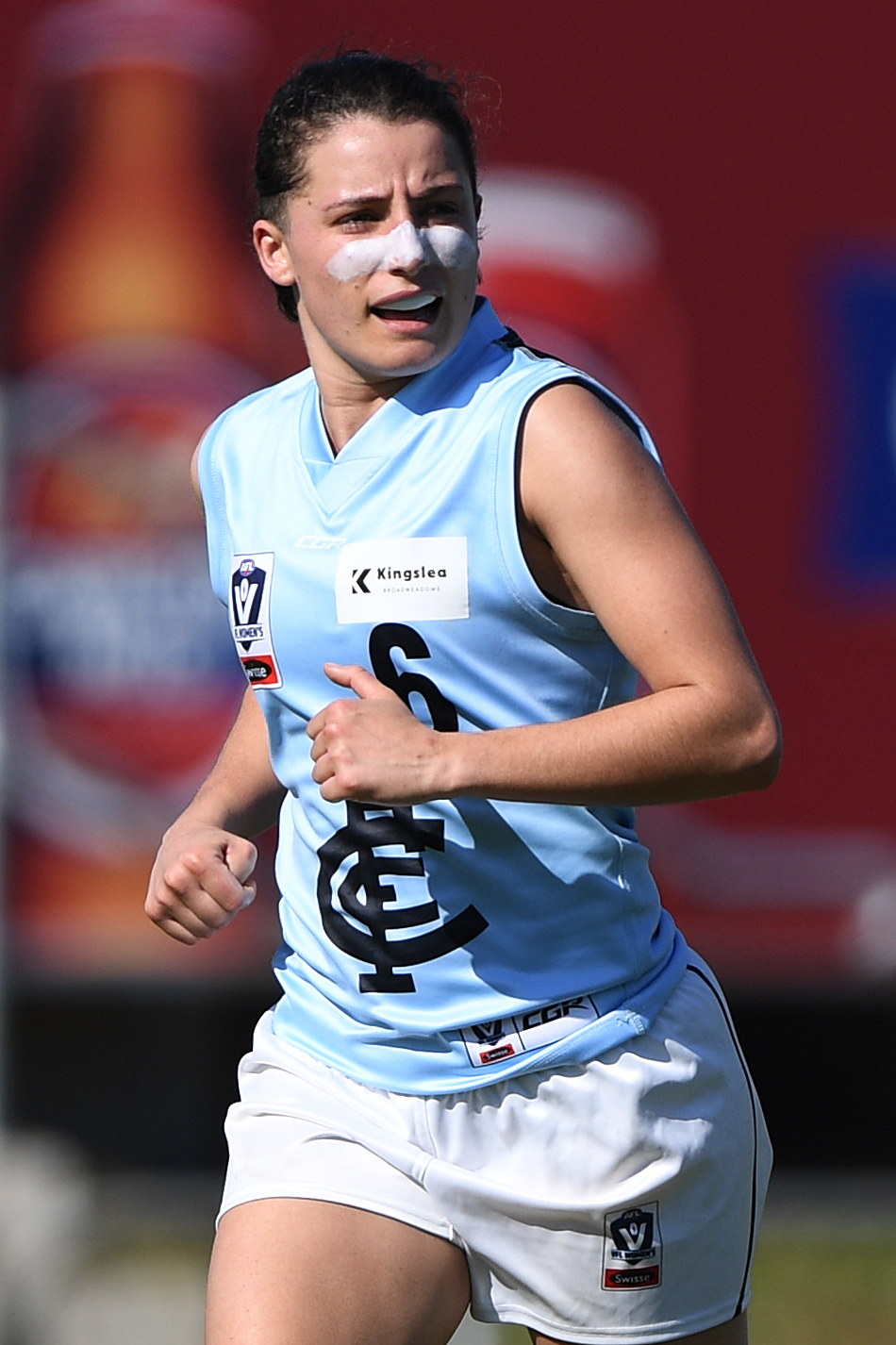
Gab Pound in 2019

Australian rules was introduced to Sri Lanka in 2016 and the country participated in the 2017 Australian Football International Cup.

Interest in Australian rules in Sri Lanka dates back to 1910, with a failed proposal for the Young Australia League to tour Colombo.

A group of AFL officials met with the country's Minister of Internal Trade & Cooperatives, Johnston Fernando in 2010. Manel Dharmakeerthie and Milton Amarasinghe, a former Director General of Sports, worked together to develop Australian Football in Sri Lanka. Their first aim is a tournament to be held in 2011. Fernando was supportive of their plans, and has agreed to offer, "his fullest support to develop footy (in Sri Lanka)." Several current and former AFL players were also present at the meeting, including the AFL's new International Ambassador, Brett Kirk. The players are in Sri Lanka to learn more about that country's indigenous Vadda people and their place in Sri Lankan society, in an attempt to assist Australia's own indigenous communities upon their return.

Cricketer Ricky Ponting who popularised the sport on the sub continent in 2008.

In 2016 talent searches were undertaken to identify players to represent Sri Lanka in the 2017 International Cup, the result was the establishment of a league in Colombo in February 2017 following clinics by Ed Kurnow, Jesse Glass-McCasker & Harry McKay of the Carlton Football Club in 2016 at local rugby clubs.

Sri Lanka affiliated with AFL Asia in 2018 along with Nepal.

==== Notable players ====
Player	AFL/AFLW Years*	AFL/AFLW Matches*	AFL/AFLW Goals*	Connections to Sri Lanka, References
Chantella Perera	2020–2021	13	0	Parent
Gab Pound	2017–	37	3	Father
Hayden Crozier	2012–2023	123	47	Father
Craig Jacotine	1999-2000	16	6	Parents
Enrico Misso	1985	1	0	Burgher descent

=== Thailand ===
Australian rules football has been played in Thailand since the 1990s with the creation of the Thailand Tigers by Australians living in the city of Bangkok. The Tigers run a domestic social league in Bangkok, as well as competing as the Tigers in regional competition. The Tigers hosted the 2007 Asian Australian Football Championships. The Thailand Tigers, was established in the 90's and has grown strong ever since. The club plays weekly intra-club matches fighting for the inaugural 'Bob & Gerry Cup' (the club founders). Also playing in international tours including hosting the annual Anzac Day Cup and events such as Indo-China tri-nations and the Asian Cup.

The Tigers is now considered a tradition for expat's from Australia and beyond, extending to the Tigers netball team for the ladies, bringing everyone together regularly for sports and social events. Family, partners and children are always welcome to Tigers events.

==== Anzac Day Cup - Hellfire Pass ====
Every year for Anzac Day, the Tigers invite an international club for a special match commemorating the memory of the prisoners-of-war (POW) working on the Hellfire Pass, part of the Burma Railway, during World War II.

The day begins early with both teams attending the dawn service at Hellfire Pass, the moving tribute sets the tone for the day.

The full-time match fielding 14 on field players commences 1:30pm in the full heat of Kanchanaburi close to the Myanmar border. The match is also attended by the Quiet Lions and VIP guests of the last remaining Diggers (POW's) who attend every year for the game. At the game's end the winning team and best player are presented with their awards by 'Snowy' a tribute to mankind with a genuine Aussie personality.

The Anzac Day Cup held in Thailand is open to all public.

==== Clubs ====
Team	Location	Founded	Notes
Thailand Tigers	Bangkok	1996	Thailand Tigers website

==== Notable players ====
Player	AFL/AFLW Years*	AFL/AFLW Matches*	AFL/AFLW Goals*	Connections to Thailand, References
Sudjai Cook	1998	7	2	Father

=== Timor Leste ===
Australian rules football has been played in Timor Leste since the 1990s with the creation of the Timor Leste Crocodile's by Australians living in the city of Dili.

=== Vietnam ===
==== Vietnam War era ====
Australian rules football was first played in Vietnam during the Vietnam War.

A match was played in May 1966 between members of the 5th Battalion, Royal Australian Regiment.

A social game was organised in 1969 by Captain Bill McMahon of Croydon, Victoria, a former Melbourne Football Club and Sandringham Football Club footballer, "Diggers" vs "The Rest" which was played with Vietnamese soldiers in August at the headquarters of the Free World Military Assistance Organisation.

In 1971, Australian Force Vietnam (AFV) and 110 Signal Squadron played a match in Saigon organised by Private Conboy of Clifton Hill, Victoria a previous member of Melbourne Football Club Under 19s squad.

There was at least one contest between 110 Signal Squadron and 104 Signal Squadron in 1970, one being played at a police or army academy at the sea-side village of Vung Tau and a little later another between the Nui Dat based units of 104 Signal Squadron and 106 Field Workshops on a pretty rough ground at the Reinforcement Wing at the Dat.

In July 2007, the Vietnam Swans, played together for the first time in Bangkok for the 8th Annual Asian Championships. They returned to the Asian Championships in 2008 in Singapore and have been playing ever since.

In 2009, highlights included the ANZAC Day Match against the Thailand Tigers at Hellfire Pass on the Death Burma Railway; a Black Saturday Tribute Match and Fundraiser against the Bali Geckos a match against HMAS Darwin and the Asian Championships.

==== Vietnamese community in Melbourne ====
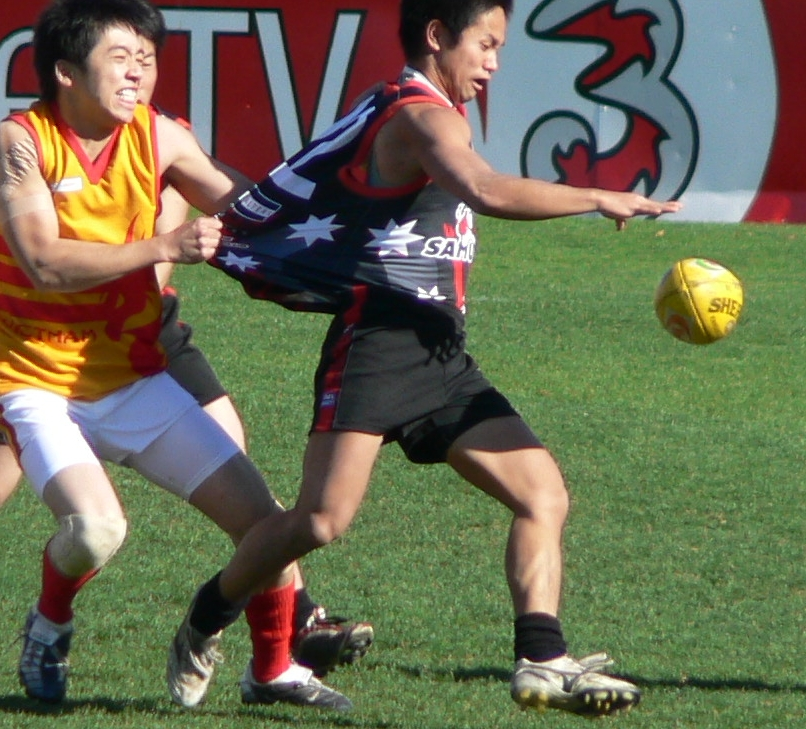
Action from Melbourne Vietnam vs Japan in 2006

A team drawn from the Melbourne Vietnamese community also competed in the Australian Football Multicultural Cup in both years of the competition's existence (2004, 2005) and has competed against touring teams from the Japan Samurai. Members of this team have expressed interest in working to develop Aussie Rules amongst local players in Vietnam, with plans to visit Hanoi for matches against the Vietnam Swans.

Players from this squad eventually formed the Elgar Park Dragons, a team mainly made up of Vietnamese-Australians affiliated with Box Hill North in the Victorian Amateur Football Association. In 2009, the Dragons became a stand-alone club under the name Southern Dragons, moving to the Southern Football League. The Dragons have since moved back to the VAFA.

A number of Vietnamese members of the Elgar Park Dragons also played for Team Asia at the 2008 Australian Football International Cup.

==== Clubs ====
Team	Location	Founded	Notes
Vietnam Swans	Hoa Lu Stadium, Saigon	2007	Vietnam Swans website

==== Notable players ====
Player	AFL/AFLW Years*	AFL/AFLW Matches*	AFL/AFLW Goals*	Connections to Vietnam, References
Jayden Nguyen	2024-	3	-	Parents
Mai Nguyen	2017	3	1	Parents
