= AFL Asia Cup =

Australian rules football competition

- Sport: Australian rules football
- First season: 2024
- No. of teams: 2024: 10 men's & 4 women's
- Country: Host: Vietnam
- Most recent champions: Japan (men); Thailand (women)
- Most titles: Japan (men; 1 title); Thailand (women; 1 title)
- Broadcaster: YouTube

The AFL Asia Cup is a triennial international tournament in Australian rules football. It is the biggest international tournament in the sport that is open to all nations in Asia. It was created as a replacement of the AFL International Cup (IC) alongside the AFL Transatlantic Cup and the AFL Pacific Cup after the competition was affected by the COVID-19 pandemic.

== History ==
On 22 April 2022, the AFL postponed 2023 International Cup, and upon cancelling the 2024 tournament on 24 July 2023 announced that it would instead sponsor three regional tournaments each hosted by an international affiliate. AFL Asia, already running the 2004 Asian Australian Football Championships in Thailand in August, was tasked with organising this additional event. The Australian Football Championships already featured an All-Asia division which had run since 2016, so the decision was made to merge that division into the AFL's proposed tournament.

Thanh Long Sports Center in Vietnam in Ho Chi Minh City was announced to host the inaugural tournament from December 6–8 in 2024. The AFL announced strict selection criteria, that each player must hold citizenship for the country that they are representing and must have played in from a local competition in that country.

The 2024 competition was contested by 10 teams in the men's division and 4 teams in the women's division. It resulted with Japan winning the men's and Thailand winning the women's

== Men's Asia Cup ==
Flag(s)	Nation(s)	Moniker	2024 (Vietnam) (10)	2027
(Cambodia)	Cambodia	Cobras	2nd	
(China)	China	Dragons	8th	
(Hong Kong)	Hong Kong, China	Lions	5th	
(India)	India	Tigers	3rd	
(Indonesia)	Indonesia	Garudas	4th	
(Japan)	Japan	Samurai	1st	
(Laos)	Laos	Elephants	9th	
(Pakistan)	Pakistan	Shaheens	6th	
(Thailand)	Thailand	Serpents	7th	
(Vietnam)	Vietnam	Buffalos	10th	

== Women's Asia Cup ==
Flag(s)	Nation(s)	Moniker	2024 (Vietnam) (4)	2027
(Cambodia)	Cambodia	Asparas	2nd	
(China)	China	Dragons	4th	
(Indonesia)	Indonesia	Garudas	3rd	
(Thailand)	Thailand	Serpents	1st	
