= Tim Fleming =

Tim Fleming may refer to:

- Tim Fleming (footballer) (born 1978), Australian rules football player
- Tim Fleming (politician), American politician from Georgia

== See also ==
- Timmy Fleming (born 1969), Irish Gaelic footballer
