= McNiece =

McNiece, MacNiece, McNeece and variants, is a surname of Irish and Scottish origin.

People with this name include:

- Ben McNiece (born 1992) Australian-rules football player
- Jake McNiece (1919–2013) WWII U.S. Army paratrooper, member of the Filthy Thirteen
