= Tim Fleming (footballer) =

Australian rules footballer

Personal information
- Full name: Tim Fleming
- Born: 5 April 1978 (age 48)
- Original teams: Broadford, Carlton Reserves
- Height: 184 cm (6 ft 0 in)
- Weight: 84 kg (185 lb)

Playing career^{1}
Years	Club	Games (Goals)
2002–2004	Richmond	34 (10)
- ^{1} Playing statistics correct to the end of 2004.

Tim Fleming (born 5 April 1978) is an Australian rules footballer who played for the Richmond Football Club in early 2000s. He was picked up by the tigers with pick 41 in the 2002 AFL National Draft. Known as a hard, tough player, that worked hard. Fleming played 34 games before leaving the club when Terry Wallace arrived. His career highlight is winning five AFL 9’s flags and the Byron Invitational with the Ballers, captained by his good mates Richard Jones and Pete Ockleshaw

Fleming was involved in a controversial incident where St Kilda star Nick Riewoldt was knocked unconscious and carried from the ground.

Before arriving at Richmond he played with Carlton, winning the Carlton reserves best and fairest in 2002. Originally from Broadford where he played his junior football, along with Assumption College, he later played for Old Xaverians FC winning 5 premierships before being drafted as mature recruit to Carlton FC.

Fleming also played one year with South Adelaide Panthers in the SANFL coming runners up best and fairest. He returned to Old Xaverians FC to captain the club to a premiership in 2009.

Fleming captained the Victorian Amateur Football Association on a number of occasions, leading the team to a narrow victory against the Eastern Football League in the 2009 Bush Fire Appeal exhibition match.

Fleming more recently has represented the Malaysian Warriors Australian Rules Football Club within the AFL Asia competition during the 2015 season, with his debut against Jakarta Bintangs resulting in a 7-goal haul, of which he won best on field honours.

Fleming is set to play a major part in the Warriors upcoming campaign to take out the Asian Australian Football Championships in October 2015.
