= Enrico Misso =

Australian rules footballer

Personal information
- Full name: Enrico Misso
- Born: 14 July 1964 (age 62)
- Original team: Ringwood
- Height: 196 cm (6 ft 5 in)
- Weight: 83 kg (183 lb)

Playing career^{1}
| Years | Club | Games (Goals) |
| 1985 | St Kilda | 1 (0) |
- ^{1} Playing statistics correct to the end of 1985.

Enrico Misso (born 14 July 1964) is a former Australian rules footballer who played with St Kilda in the Victorian Football League (VFL).

Notable as the first player of Sri Lankan descent to play a VFL/AFL match, Misso played one senior match as a ruckman in 1985. He has since taken on suburban football coaching roles, and coached the Sri Lankan team in the 2017 Australian Football International Cup.
