= Ben McNiece =

Australian rules footballer

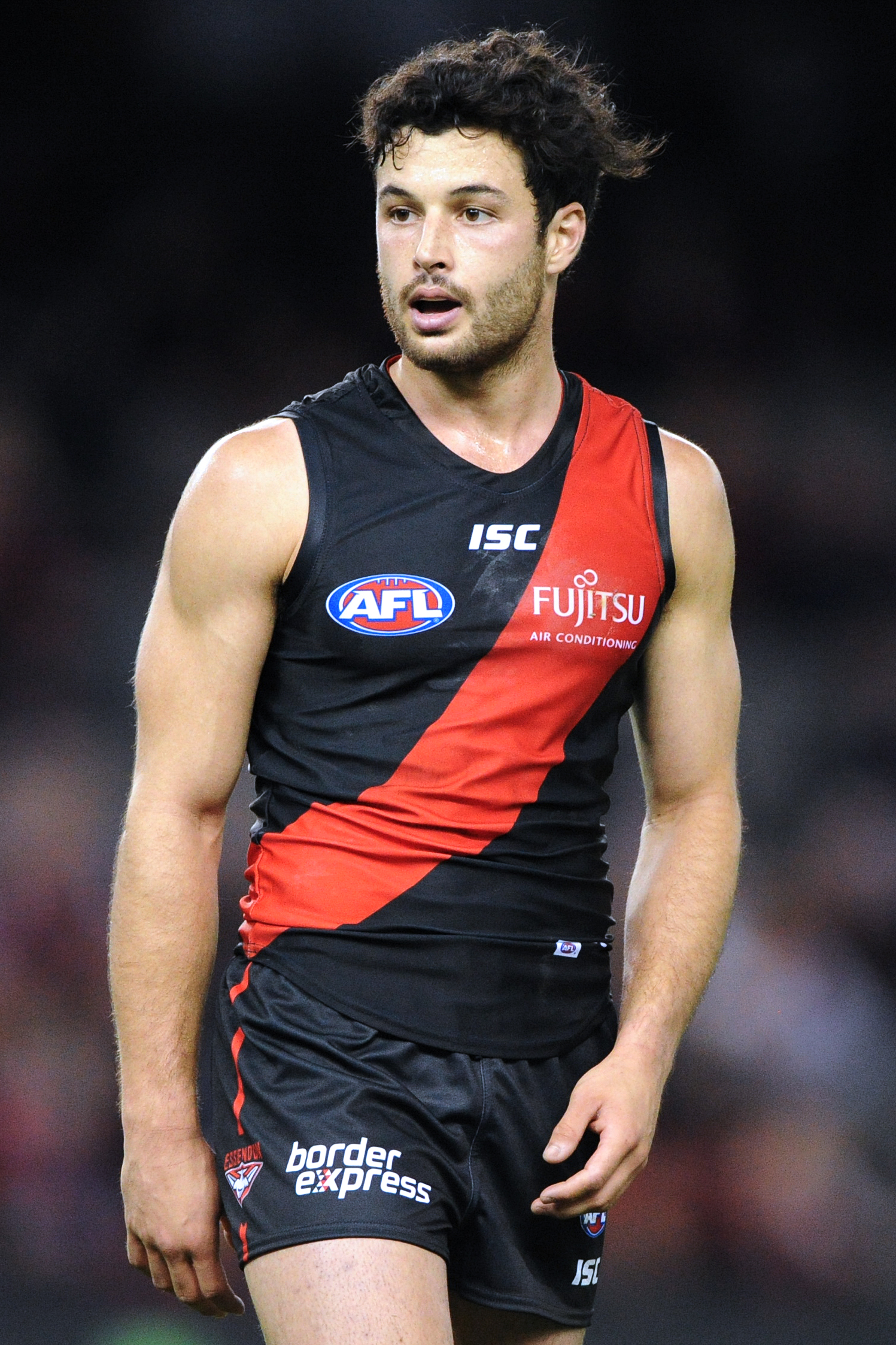
- McNiece playing for Essendon in April 2018

Personal information
- Full name: Ben McNiece
- Nickname: Alfie
- Born: 22 March 1992 (age 34)
- Original team: Northcote Park
- Debut: Round 5, 2017, Essendon vs. Collingwood, at MCG
- Height: 178 cm (5 ft 10 in)
- Weight: 80 kg (176 lb)
- Position: Defender

Club information
- Current club: Essendon
- Number: 41

Playing career^{1}
Years	Club	Games (Goals)
2017-2019	Essendon	15 (0)
- ^{1} Playing statistics correct to the end of round 18, 2018.

Ben McNiece (born 22 March 1992) is a former professional Australian rules footballer who played for the Essendon Football Club in the Australian Football League (AFL). He was recruited by Essendon as a category B rookie through the next generation academy in November 2016, qualifying by virtue of his mother being Indian. He had previously played for Essendon's VFL team for the prior two seasons. He made his AFL debut in the Anzac Day clash against Collingwood at the Melbourne Cricket Ground in round five of the 2017 season in an eighteen-point win.
