= Asian Australian Football Championships =

Annual tournament of Australian rules football

- Current season, competition or edition: 2023 Asian Australian Football Championships
- Sport: Australian rules football
- First season: 2000
- Country: Host: Bangkok, Thailand
- Most recent champions: (Papua New Guinea) PNG Muruks (men); Singapore Wombettes (women)
- Most titles: Hong Kong Dragons (men; 6 titles); Vietnam Swans (women; 2 titles)
- Broadcaster: YouTube
- Website: AFL Asia Australian Football Championships

The Asian Australian Football Championships, also known as the AFL Asian Championships or Asian Champs, is an annual tournament of Australian rules football between AFL Asia member clubs.

The tournament is considered the pinnacle of Asian Australian football calendar and is challenged by a growing number of teams from over a dozen Asian countries.

The competition consists of 3 open men's divisions, 1 women's division and a juniors division. A record 21 teams from 13 countries competed in 2018.

The 2023 event was contested in Bangkok, Thailand, on 9 September at the Thai Polo and Equestrian Club, Chon Buri.

== Format ==
The tournament is played over one day with all teams playing shortened games between 20 and 24 minutes duration, with reduced numbers and smaller field sizes. In each division, each team plays each other once then there is a knock-out finals series including Semi-Finals, Preliminary Final and Grand Final.

First division is played as a 16-a-side format. Second division is played in a 12-a-side format.

There are three Men's Divisions, Women's Division and an All-Asia Cup (only local players allowed).

=== Teams ===
Team	Home/city	Province/Country	Debut	Men's Div 1 Titles	Women's Div 1 Titles
Bali Geckos	Bali	Indonesia	2006		
Cambodian Eagles	Phnom Penh	Cambodia	2015		
China Blues		China	2002		
China Reds		China	2000		
Dubai Heat	Dubai	United Arab Emirates	2007	3	
Hong Kong Dragons	Hong Kong	Hong Kong	2000	6	
Indonesian Bintangs	Jakarta	Indonesia	2000	2	
Indonesian Volcanoes	Jakarta	Indonesia	2018	1	
Jakarta Bintangs	Jakarta	Indonesia	2005		
Japan Goannas	Tokyo	Japan	2005		
Lao Elephants	Vientiane	Laos	2008		
Macau Lightning	Macau	Macau	2010		
Malaysian Warriors	Kuala Lumpur	Malaysia	2009	1	1
Myanmar Fighting Cocks	Yangon	Myanmar	2015		
Pakistan Markhoors		Pakistan	2022		
Philippine Eagles	Manila	Philippines	2013	1	
PNG Muruks	Port Moresby	Papua New Guinea	2018	4	
Singapore Wombats	Singapore	Singapore	2000	4	2
Thailand Tigers	Bangkok	Thailand	2007		
Vietnam Swans		Vietnam	2000		2

== History ==
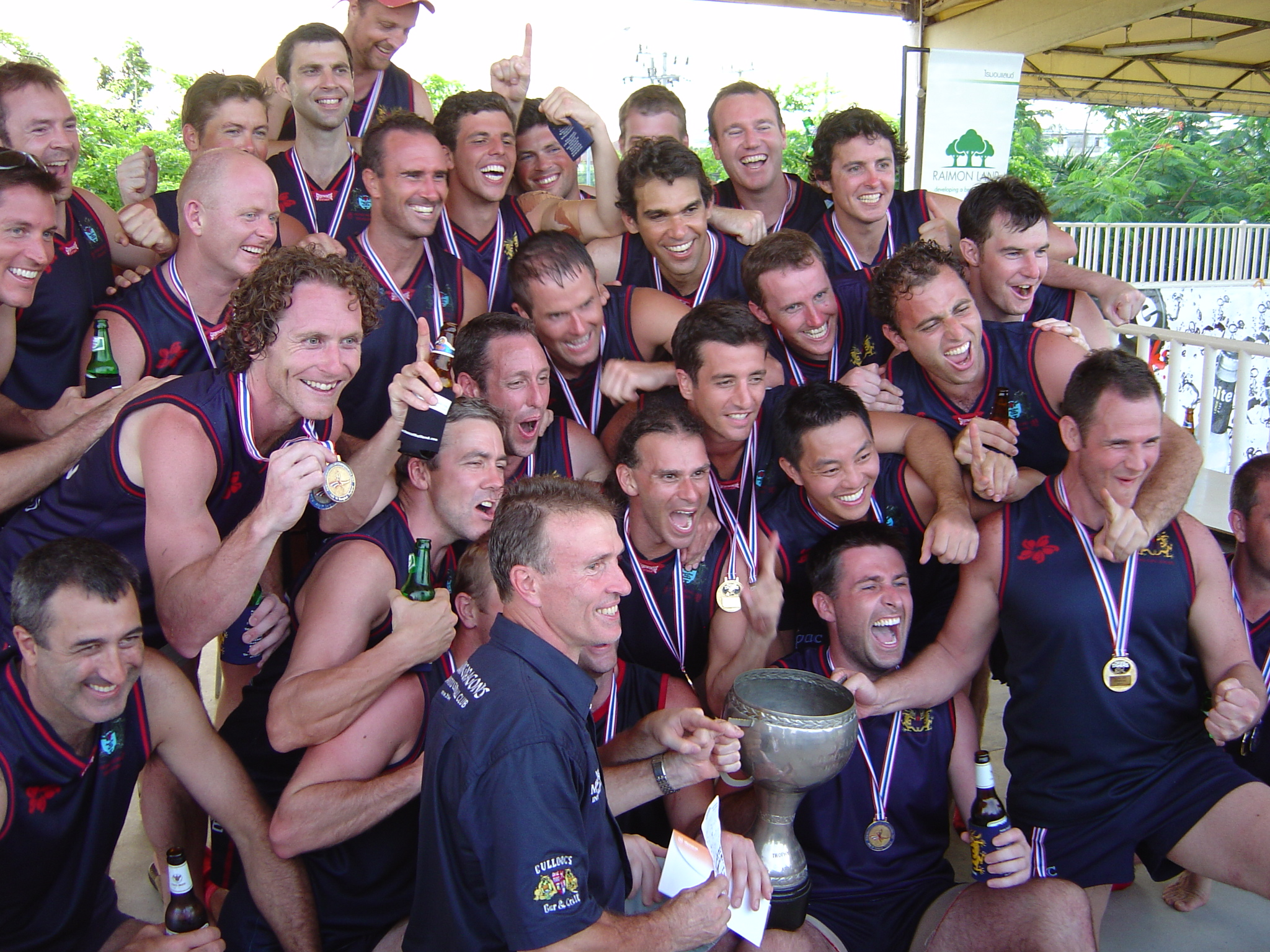
Hong Kong Dragons after winning the 2007 Championship in Bangkok, Thailand

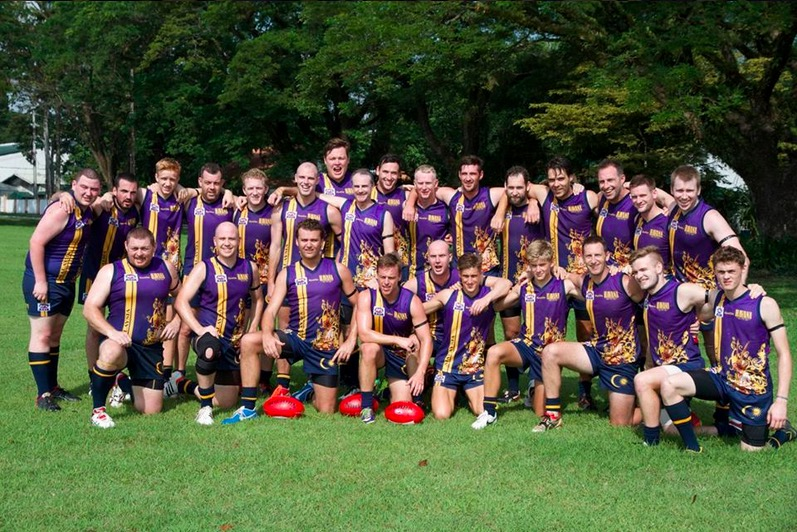
Malaysian Warriors team pictured from the 2014 event at Clark Field, Philippines

The Asian Australian Football Championships were first held in 2000, although a precursor tournament named the Four Nations Cup was held in Bangkok, Thailand, in 1999.

There was an offer in 2005 to make the championships part of the Arafura Games, in Darwin, Australia, but this was turned down by Asian clubs.

In 2008, a junior division was introduced; however, this was short-lived.

While traditionally the tournament has been dominated by expat-Australian players, local players are becoming more prominent, with 40 local players from China, Cambodia, Laos, Thailand, Indonesia, Philippines and Vietnam competing in an East Asia vs South East Asia local player exhibition game in 2015. In 2016, an All-Asian Cup was held the day before the Asian Championships with three all-local player teams. In 2017, a local-player quota of 2 players per team was introduced. In 2015, the tournament was expanded to two divisions: a 16-a-side first division and a 12-a-side second division.

In 2018, the tournament also included a women's division with a record 21 teams from 13 countries competing.

== Tournament Details ==
Year	Date	Venue	Men's Div 1 Champions	Women's Div 1 Champions	Men's Div 2 Champions	Men's Div 3 Champions	All-Asia Cup Winners*	Div 2 Plate Winners	Junior Champions
2000		Jakarta, Indonesia	Indonesian Bintangs	-	-	-	-	-	-
2001		Bangkok, Thailand	Singapore Wombats	-	-	-	-	-	
2002		Singapore	Indonesian Bintangs	-	-	-	-	-	-
2003		Hong Kong	Hong Kong Dragons	-	-	-	-	-	-
2004		Kuala Lumpur, Malaysia	Hong Kong Dragons	-	-	-	-	-	-
2005		Manila, Philippines	Singapore Wombats	-	-	-	-	-	-
2006		Jakarta, Indonesia	Singapore Wombats	-	-	-	-	-	-
2007		Bangkok, Thailand	Hong Kong Dragons	-	-	-	-	-	-
2008		Singapore	Dubai Heat	-	-	-	-	-	Jakarta Bulldogs
2009		Kuala Lumpur, Malaysia	Dubai Heat	-	-	-	-	-	Jakarta Bulldogs
2010		Shanghai, China	Dubai Heat	-	-	-	-	-	-
2011		Bangkok, Thailand	Singapore Wombats	-	-	-	-	-	-
2012		Pattaya, Thailand	Hong Kong Dragons	-	-	-	-	-	-
2013	17 August	Pattaya, Thailand	Hong Kong Dragons	-	-	-	-	-	-
2014	11 October	Angeles City, Philippines	Singapore Wombats	-	-	-	-	-	-
2015	17 October	Bangkok, Thailand	Hong Kong Dragons	-	Lao Elephants	-	-	-	-
2016	14–15 October	Ho Chi Minh City, Vietnam	Philippine Eagles	-	Bali Geckos	-	Indonesia Garudas	-	-
2017	21 October	Manila, Philippines	Malaysian Warriors	-	Bali Geckos	-	China Dragons	-	-
2018	13 October	Kuala Lumpur, Malaysia	Indonesian Volcanoes	Vietnam Swans	PNG Muruks	-	China Dragons	China Reds	-
2019	31 August	Pattaya, Thailand	PNG Muruks	Malaysian Warriors	Vietnam Swans	Japan Goannas	-	-	-
2020	Cancelled (due to COVID-19 pandemic)	Thailand							
2021	Cancelled (due to COVID-19 pandemic)	Thailand							
2022	22 October	Bangkok Patana School Sport Complex, Bangkok, Thailand	PNG Muruks	Singapore Wombettes	Thailand Tigers	Pakistan Markhors	-	-	-
2023	9 September	Thai Polo and Equestrian Club, Chon Buri Bangkok, Thailand	PNG Muruks	Vietnam Swans	Malaysian Warriors	Philippine Eagles	-	-	-
2024	31 August	Thai Polo and Equestrian Club, Chon Buri Bangkok, Thailand	PNG Muruks	Singapore Wombettes	Singapore Wombats	Japan Goannas	-	-	-

- All-Asia Cup – 2016: All-local player tournament played between Indonesia, China and Indo-China, 2017 and 2018: China vs AFL Asia Lions all-local player match played at the Shanghai AFL game.

== See also ==
- Australian rules football in Asia
- AFL Asia
