= Rupert Bruce-Mitford =

British archaeologist and scholar (1914–1994)

Rupert Bruce-Mitford FBA FSA
- Bruce-Mitford in 1976, aged 62
- Born: 14 June 1914; Streatham, London, England
- Died: 10 March 1994 (aged 79); Oxford, England
- Education: Hertford College, Oxford (BA 1936, MA 1961, DLitt 1987)
- Occupation: Archaeologist
- Spouses: Kathleen Dent (m. 1941; div. 1972) Marilyn Luscombe (m. 1975; div. 1984) Margaret Adams (m. 1988–1994)
- Children: 3
- Parents: Charles Eustace Bruce-Mitford; Beatrice Allison
- Relatives: Terence Mitford (brother)

Rupert Leo Scott Bruce-Mitford (14 June 1914 – 10 March 1994) was a British archaeologist and scholar. He spent the majority of his career at the British Museum, primarily as the keeper of the Department of British and Medieval Antiquities, and was particularly known for his work on the Sutton Hoo ship-burial. Described as the guiding spirit of such research, he oversaw the production of the monumental three-volume work The Sutton Hoo Ship-Burial, termed by the president of the Society of Antiquaries as "one of the great books of the century".

Though Bruce-Mitford was born in London, his preceding two generations had lived largely abroad: his maternal grandparents as early settlers of British Columbia, his paternal grandparents as missionaries in India, and his parents as schoolteachers in Japan. When Bruce-Mitford was five, his father died. His mother was left to raise four sons, of whom Bruce-Mitford was the youngest, on a tiny salary; the stresses were substantial, and he was fostered for a time after his mother had a breakdown. He attended preparatory school with the support of a relative, enrolled at the charity school Christ's Hospital five years later, and, in 1933, earned a Baring Scholarship in History to attend Hertford College, Oxford. Recommending him for a museum curatorship in 1936, the University Appointments Board noted that he "has an exceptional gift for research, a sphere in which he could do work of outstanding merit".

After spending a year as an assistant keeper at the Ashmolean Museum, during which he produced the first standardised chronology of medieval pottery, in December 1937, Bruce-Mitford joined the British Museum's Department of British and Medieval Antiquities. The ship-burial was excavated in 1939, weeks before the outbreak of the Second World War; Bruce-Mitford spent 1940 to 1946 in the Royal Corps of Signals, and returned with responsibility over Sutton Hoo. Bruce-Mitford spent much of the next four decades focused on the subject, publishing dozens of works, studying contemporary graves in Scandinavia (excavating a boat-grave in Sweden and learning Swedish and Danish along the way), and leading a second round of excavations at Sutton Hoo from 1965 to 1970.

In his other duties, Bruce-Mitford excavated at the Mawgan Porth Dark Age Village, published significant works on the Lindisfarne Gospels, the Codex Amiatinus, and (posthumously) Celtic hanging bowls, translated P. V. Glob's book The Bog People into English, and oversaw acquisitions including Courtenay Adrian Ilbert's collection of thousands of clocks and watches, considered the greatest such collection in the world. He also founded the Society for Medieval Archaeology, and served as secretary, and later vice-president, of the Society of Antiquaries. After his retirement from the British Museum in 1977, he served as Slade Professor of Fine Art at the University of Cambridge, a visiting fellow at All Souls College, Oxford, and a faculty visitor in the Department of English at the Australian National University.

== Early life and background ==
Rupert Leo Scott Bruce-Mitford was born on 14 June 1914 at 1 Deerhurst Road, Streatham, London. Following Terence, Vidal and Alaric (Alec), he was the fourth of four sons born to Charles Eustace and Beatrice Jean Bruce-Mitford; a daughter did not survive. Family tradition has it that Rupert's brothers were responsible for his given names, selecting them from their reading: Rupert from Anthony Hope's Rupert of Hentzau, Leo from Rider Haggard's She, and Scott from either Robert Falcon Scott's diary, or his "Message to England". (Note: Per Bruce-Mitford's obituary, he "always considered himself lucky not to have been named after Rudolf Rassendyll, the English gentleman hero of [Rupert of Hentzau]".)

Bruce-Mitford's paternal great-grandparents, George and Elizabeth Beer, sailed to the Godavari River Delta in India to work as Baptist missionaries in 1836; poor and unordained when they left, they went on, according to Anthony Norris Groves's biographer, to "stand amongst the most tenacious Christian workers of all time". Their two sons, John William and Charles Henry, continued the calling, while their two daughters married schoolteachers in the area. In 1866 John Beer married Margaret Anne Midford, the daughter of an English family living in Machilipatnam. They had five children, including in 1871 Herbert Leonard and in 1875 Eustace, Rupert Bruce-Mitford's father. The family returned to Devon in 1884, when John Beer fell ill. He died shortly after arrival; his wife returned to India, but died there four years later. Eustace Beer, Rupert Bruce-Mitford would later write, was thereby "himself twice orphaned while still a small boy". By 1891 he was in England, having either returned or never left following his father's death. After studying in Exeter he taught English and Classics at Blackburn Grammar School, but then sailed from Genoa in 1901 to teach at the Weihaiwei School in China, an institution for European boys founded by his brother Herbert. He left less than nine months later for Japan, intending to establish his own school there with a curriculum and ethos reflecting his own ideas.

Shortly before his 1902 departure to China, Eustace Beer adopted the surname Bruce-Mitford—perhaps indicative of his desire to separate himself from his family's missionary past. "Mitford" was a take on "Midford", his mother's maiden name, and, perhaps not unintentionally, that of the unrelated Bertram Freeman-Mitford, 1st Baron Redesdale, whose name carried respect in the British expatriate community in Japan. "Bruce" may have been taken from Major Clarence Dalrymple Bruce, an acquaintance who commanded the Weihaiwei Regiment. In Japan Eustace founded the Yokohama Modern School, which targeted the sons of English, and English-speaking, businessmen and missionaries. In 1903, and likely on the basis of his book and articles on Weihaiwei, he was elected a fellow of the Royal Geographical Society; he subsequently became interested in geography and vulcanology, writing additional works on Japan. (Note: Eustace Bruce-Mitford's books included The Territory of Wei-hai-wei: A Descriptive Guide and Handbook with Maps and Illustrations a Historical Note and Appendix (1902), A New Geography of Japan for the Upper Forms of Schools and Colleges (1905), and Japan's Inheritance: The Country, Its People, and Their Destiny (1914). His articles included "Wei-Hai-Wei: Some Physical Characteristics of Our New Dependency in the Far East" (1903), "Mountain and Cliff at Weihaiwei" (1903), "Notes on the Physiography of Certain Volcanoes in Northern Japan" (1908), and "The Active Volcanoes of Japan" (1909). He also wrote a three-column article, "The Volcanoes of Japan", as part of a lengthy Japan supplement in The Times in 1910.)

Eustace Bruce-Mitford had met Beatrice Allison on his ship to Yokohama, and soon after founding his school recruited her as an assistant teacher; they married on 27 July 1904, at Christ Church, Yokohama. (Note: Beatrice Allison was the sister of Rose Isabella Allison, who in May 1898 married Samuel Dickinson Sandes, an English mining engineer. Sandes was the brother of First World War soldier Flora Sandes, about whom Bruce-Mitford may have read as a child.) She was the eldest daughter of early settlers of British Columbia, Susan Louisa (née Moir) and John Fall Allison, an explorer, gold prospector, and cattle rancher. In 1908, however, by which time the family had three sons, William Awdry, the Bishop of South Tokyo, announced from the pulpit of Christ Church that "certain marriages of British subjects celebrated in Japan" might not be legally valid, and if so "the couples ... will find that they have been and are living together ... in concubinage and that their children are 'illegitimate'". Though a legal technicality, and one which was remedied by an Act of Parliament in 1912, the announcement disgraced the Bruce-Mitfords, and Eustace lost his leadership of the Yokohama Modern School. (Note: Writing in 1989, Bruce-Mitford observed that "about 1909 my father seems to have fallen out with his Committee of Governors. I never learnt what this was about.") He was taken on as an assistant editor by Francis Brinkley, owner and editor of The Japan Mail, though by 1911 had returned to England as a freelance journalist. Rupert Bruce-Mitford was born three years after his family returned from Japan. Three years later, his father left for India to work as an assistant editor at The Madras Mail. Eustace died following a short fever in 1919, when he was forty-four and Rupert five.

Following the death of his father, Bruce-Mitford later wrote, "the family was stranded in London and fell on very hard times". His mother then earned roughly £170 a year (equivalent to £8,900 in 2025), of which she lent £120 (equivalent to £6,300 in 2025) to Terence and Vidal, to be repaid after their studies, and spent approximately £42 18s yearly (equivalent to £2,250 in 2025) for part of a house, with rent paid weekly. Bruce-Mitford was frequently sick as a child, coming down with scarlet fever and diphtheria when aged two, and influenza when around six. The stresses on the family were substantial, and at one point Beatrice had a breakdown, causing Rupert to be fostered for a time.

== Education ==
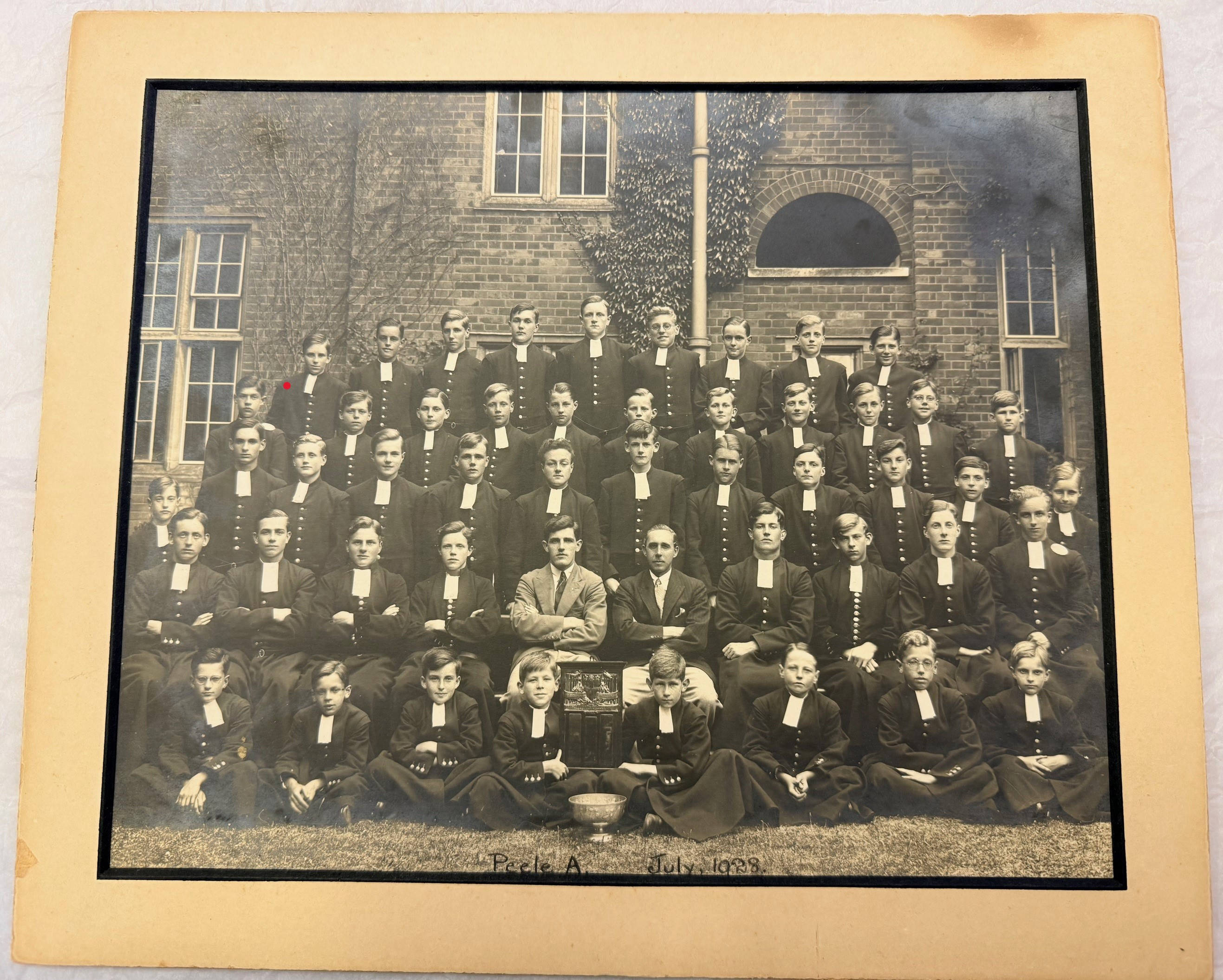
July 1929 photograph of Peele A House at Christ's Hospital; Bruce-Mitford is indicated with a red dot at the back left

Fatherless and poor, Rupert Bruce-Mitford was educated with the financial support of his mother's cousin. The support hinged, Bruce-Mitford later wrote, "on one condition – that my father's novel, depicting life in Yokohama at the turn of the century, should be burnt; she thought it immoral and scurrilous". Around 1920, Bruce-Mitford was thereby sent to Brightlands preparatory school in Dulwich, London, which his brothers Terence and Alec also attended before receiving scholarships to Dulwich College. Bruce-Mitford was baptised around the same time, perhaps to improve his later chances of admittance to the charity school Christ's Hospital. Five years later the Brightlands headmaster nominated Bruce-Mitford to take an examination for Christ's Hospital. Following success in the examination—covering the three compulsory subjects of English, arithmetic and practical mensuration, and history and geography, as well as all three optional subjects of Latin, French, and mathematics—and his mother's application, he was admitted on 17 September 1925.

Bruce-Mitford was successful, and happy, at Christ's Hospital. He was also introduced to archaeology; in 1930 he participated in a dig with S. E. Winbolt at the Jacobean ironworks in Dedisham, Sussex. Winbolt wrote in the school magazine that "unhappily the 'dig' produced no useful results", but added that "possibly, however, the C.H. diggers learnt something", and named Bruce-Mitford "among willing helpers, mentioned honoris causa". Meanwhile, Bruce-Mitford was active in school events, including playing rugby and cricket, acting in (and directing the orchestra for) John Galsworthy's The Little Man, debating at the Horsham Workers' Educational Association, and writing his first article, on a ten-day signals camp held over the 1931 summer holiday.

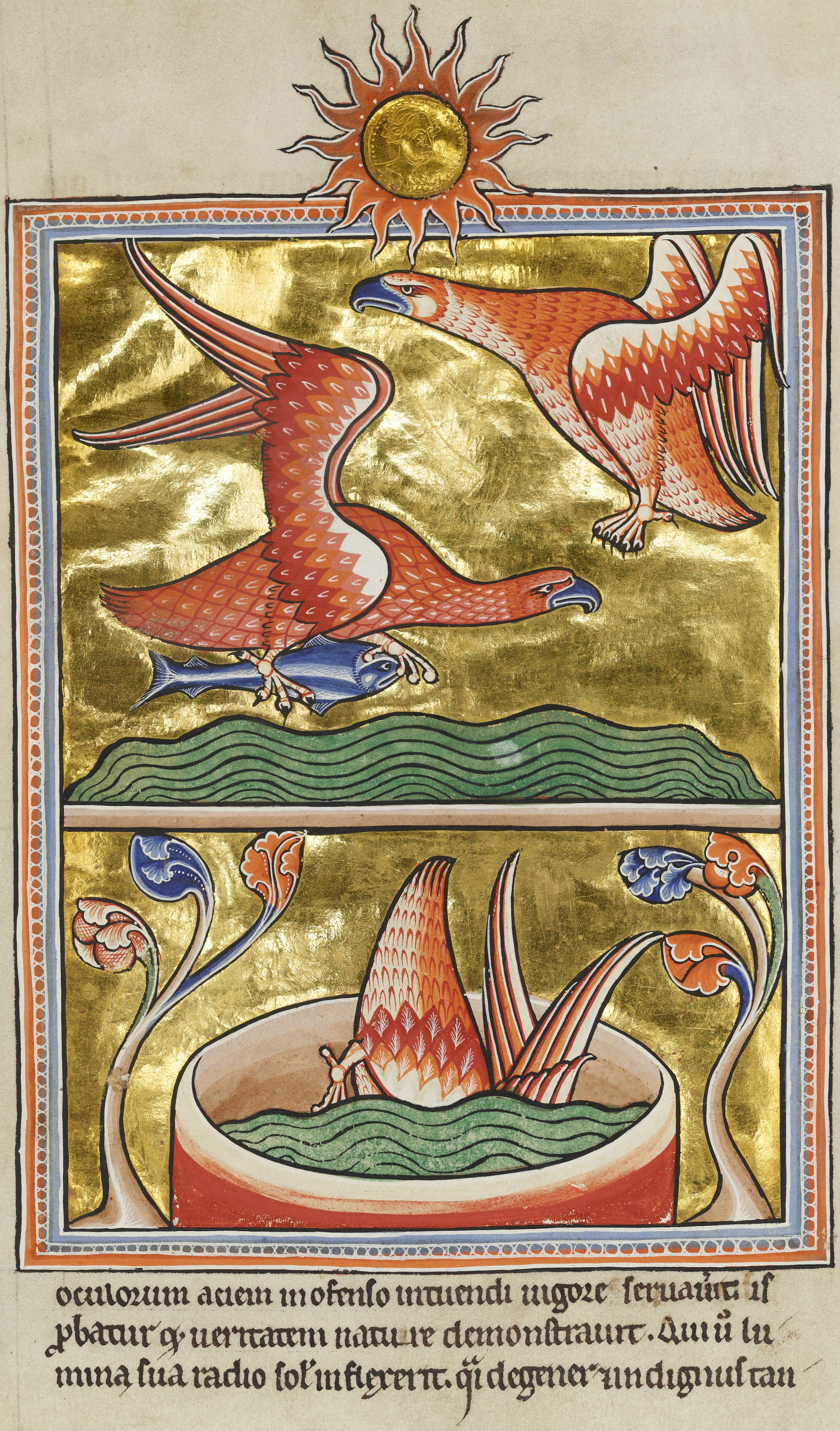
The illustration from folio 74r of the Ashmole Bestiary, which captured Bruce-Mitford's attention at Oxford

By the time Bruce-Mitford was 16 or 17, he had switched his studies from classics to history—the result, in no small part, of his shaky grasp of Greek and Latin, despite devoted tutoring by his brother Terence. Around the same time, he came across Samuel Gardner's English Gothic Foliage Sculpture in the school's library, and upon reading it discovered his love of the concrete and visual. (Note: Writing in 1978, Bruce-Mitford incorrectly recalled the book as English Gothic Stiff-leafed Foliage by W. R. Lethaby.) In 1933, he was awarded a £100 (equivalent to £6,200 in 2025) Baring Scholarship in History to attend Hertford College, Oxford. This came as surprise, he wrote, "for I never had a head for dates and treaties". But as he recalled four decades later, at Oxford "I fell in love with the atmosphere and smell of the oldest part of the Library where, under the flat-arched 15th century ceiling, cases displaying illuminated manuscripts were set out". One, the twelfth-century Ashmole Bestiary, open to a folio of a red eagle on a background of gold, so captured his attention that "after some weeks I could stand my ignorance and quell my curiosity no longer", and, "[s]crewing up my courage", asked for permission to see it; he remained absorbed in the work through lunch and until evicted at the end of the day.

During school vacations, Bruce-Mitford often took the tram to the British Museum, where he spent time in the Reading Room. He also walked around the building, listening to guest lecturers speak on the objects, and particularly enjoying hearing about the Chinese paintings and the Royal Gold Cup. In 1936, he obtained his bachelor's degree with a Second Class in Modern History, and in Michaelmas term began a postgraduate Bachelor of Letters on "The Development of English Narrative Art in the Fourteenth Century". The research included an investigation of the pigments (particularly Egyptian blue) used in early illuminated manuscripts. Bruce-Mitford's supervisor was Robin Flower, deputy keeper of manuscripts at the British Museum. The same year, the University Appointments Board recommended Bruce-Mitford for the curatorship of the York Castle Museum, writing that he "would do well in a trading or administrative post, but has an exceptional gift for research, a sphere in which he could do work of outstanding merit". (Note: The spot was filled by Allen Grove, however, for the founder, John Kirk, wanted a curator who came with experience in modern museum practices.) He never finished the Bachelor of Letters, although he was promoted to the rank of Master of Arts in 1961 and awarded a Doctor of Letters in 1987, both from Hertford College. (Note: Consistent with the practice at Oxford and certain other UK universities, Hertford awards Masters of Arts upon application by alumni after a certain number of years. No further study is undertaken to obtain the degree. A Doctor of Letters is also awarded without further university study. It is awarded based on an evaluation of the applicant's post-graduation contributions to a field, such as key publications.)

== Career ==
=== Ashmolean Museum ===
By 1937, Bruce-Mitford had taken a one-year position as an assistant keeper at the Ashmolean Museum. Initial work included rearranging and displaying the museum's collection of medieval pilgrims' badges. Soon, however, he was introduced to what would be later termed rescue archaeology, when a group of seventeenth-century houses was demolished in favour of a large extension to the Bodleian Library. Before the demolition, the head of the library invited the Oxfordshire Architectural and Historical Society to investigate the houses for their architectural or antiquarian interest, and observe the forthcoming demolition and excavations of foundations. The Society, in turn, created a subcommittee consisting of Edward Tudor Long, Edward Thurlow Leeds, and William Abel Pantin to direct an investigation of the houses and watch for finds during their demolition.

Demolition lasted from December 1936 to March 1937, after which began, according to the geologist William Joscelyn Arkell, "the removal of the greatest quantity of subsoil ... ever taken out of one hole within the City of Oxford". Bruce-Mitford was tasked with watching the site during the excavation. Much of his work involved waiting for the well in front of each house to be dug out, revealing two or three feet (around half a metre to a metre) of mud at the bottom, filled with broken medieval pottery and other artefacts. He waited "impotently", he later recalled, for the jaws of the mechanical diggers (which would not wait for the archaeologists) to pick up the mud and transfer it to a lorry; he then jumped aboard, and picked out the artefacts as the lorry made its way "to some gravel hungry site at Cumnor". When back at the Ashmolean, he would wash the sherds and stick them together. Bruce-Mitford's energy and eye resulted in a collection of pottery that was exceptionally useful. Because the wells quickly silted up during their use and had to be replaced by new ones every 50 or so years, Bruce-Mitford found it possible to accurately date pottery within particularly short time-frames. In 1939, he published an article on the finds, to be read in conjunction with an article by Pantin, in which he described five distinct groups of pottery in their probable chronological order; his brother Alaric provided the illustrations. This was "the first serious study of medieval pottery", wrote the archaeologist Maureen Mellor in 1997, and "has never had to be challenged, although refined and extended". Bruce-Mitford's work also influenced him, decades later, to create a national reference collection of medieval pottery at the British Museum.

=== British Museum ===
On 3 December 1937, Bruce-Mitford was named assistant keeper (second class) of the Department of British and Medieval Antiquities at the British Museum. He was possibly helped in this position by his professor from two years previously, Robin Flower, also the deputy keeper of manuscripts. The following year Bruce-Mitford was reacquainted with archaeological work, spending three weeks with Gerhard Bersu at the Iron Age site of Little Woodbury in Wiltshire. "I learned a lot", he later wrote, "and loved being out on the chalk, in the fresh air." There, Bruce-Mitford met Charles Phillips, the secretary of the Prehistoric Society (for which Bersu was digging).

In 1939 Bruce-Mitford was tasked with leading an excavation, this time at the medieval village of Seacourt in Oxfordshire. Though Seacourt was a difficult site, Bruce-Mitford thought it would be possible to determine a complete ground plan of domestic buildings and of the church. It was also a village that was known to have been deserted and archaeologically sealed by 1439, within a century of the Black Death. This provided a terminus ante quem for any artefacts found there, offering the chance to obtain important chronological evidence as to pottery and small objects such as brooches, ornaments, bucks, fittings, shears, horseshoes, and nails, the dating of which was particularly imprecise. Excavations wrapped up 15 July 1939, seven weeks before Britain's entry into the Second World War. (Note: Excavations at the site were continued two decades later by Martin Biddle.)

=== Second World War ===
In uniform as a member of the Royal Signals, c. 1940

From 1940 to 1946, Bruce-Mitford served in the Royal Corps of Signals. Joining as a lance corporal and initially assigned to a territorial unit in Essex, he transmitted morse code during the day, after which he watched for fires from the dome of St Paul's Cathedral. He was in Catterick Camp in North Yorkshire by autumn, when The Yorkshire Archæological Journal reported that he and his friends cleared out a Roman hypocaust at Middleham. The site had previously been excavated around 1881 and 1906. Bruce-Mitford's notes were published in The Journal of Roman Studies, with photographs taken by Eric Lomax.

Bruce-Mitford was commissioned as a second lieutenant on 1 February 1941, and promoted to war substantive lieutenant on 1 August 1942, acting captain on 20 November 1942, and temporary captain on 26 February 1943. By 1943 he was working on the publications staff of the Royal School of Signals at Catterick, where he wrote a booklet on wireless communication, attempted to reorganise the Northern Command's signals system, and travelled around Yorkshire by motorcycle, laying cable. From 1943 to 1945, he led parties from the School of Signals to archaeological and other sites across Northern England, including Richmond Castle, Jervaulx Abbey, Easby Parish Church, Stanwick St John, Middleham Castle, and the Georgian Theatre Royal, recording notes and commentaries when there.

=== Return to the British Museum ===
==== Sutton Hoo ====
Bruce-Mitford spent the war awaiting his return to the Department of British and Medieval Antiquities. As early as 1940, T. D. Kendrick—then keeper of the department, later director of the museum—wrote to Bruce-Mitford at his army camp, telling him he would be responsible for the collection of Anglo-Saxon antiquities, the Germanic collections of Europe, and the Late Celtic collections of the British Isles. The letter closed with a warning: "You will also be responsible for Sutton Hoo. Brace yourself for this task." Bruce-Mitford's responsibility for the Anglo-Saxon Sutton Hoo ship-burial, wrote the Oxford scholar Martin Biddle, would become "the defining moment of Rupert's life, his greatest challenge, the source of almost insuperable difficulties, and his greatest achievement". Discharged from the army as an honorary captain in early 1946, Bruce-Mitford immediately returned to the museum; the first lecture he attended after discharge was by Phillips on Sutton Hoo.

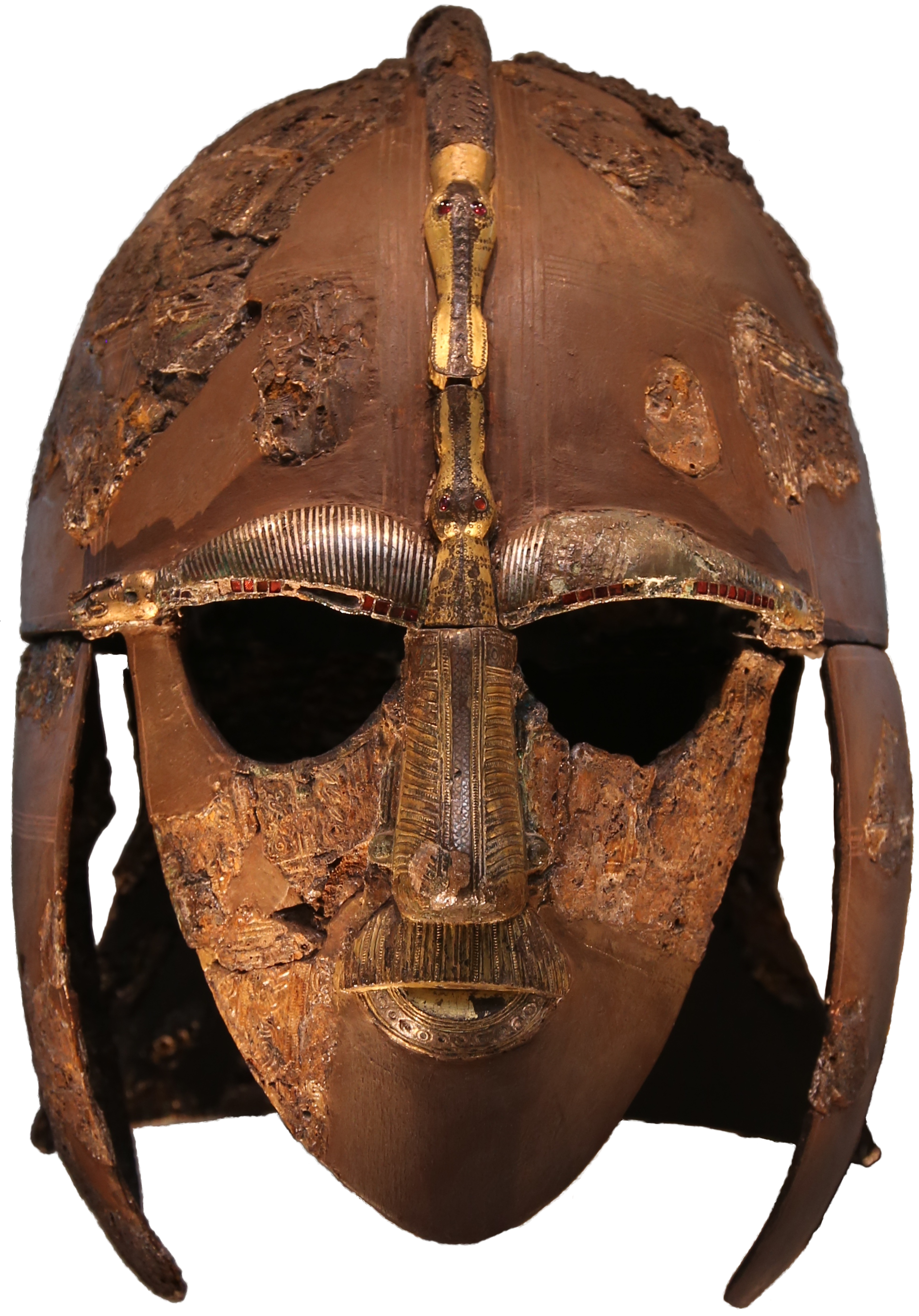
The Sutton Hoo helmet is one of the most iconic finds from the Sutton Hoo ship-burial

Bruce-Mitford returned to a museum that had suffered during the war. Understaffed and with inadequate facilities, the museum had much of its collection still in storage. The Sutton Hoo finds, excavated in 1939 and promptly taken to the safety of the tunnel connecting the Aldwych and Holborn tube stations, had been returned to the museum only a year or two before. Herbert Maryon, a technical attaché recruited for the task, set to work restoring what Bruce-Mitford later termed "the real headaches – notably the crushed shield, helmet and drinking horns". "When I began work", he continued, "I sat with Maryon while he took me through the material and with infectious enthusiasm, demonstrated what he was doing". "There followed great days for Sutton Hoo when new, often dramatic, discoveries were being made in the workshops all the time. Built from fragments, astonishing artefacts – helmet, shield, drinking horns, and so on – were recreated."

Early in 1946, Kendrick and Bruce-Mitford placed restored artefacts from Sutton Hoo on display in the museum's King Edward VII Gallery. In January 1947, Bruce-Mitford was elected a fellow of the Society of Antiquaries of London, (Note: Bruce-Mitford served as Secretary of the organisation from 1950 to 1954, and as a Vice-President from 1972 to 1976. In September 1973, during the 24th meeting of the Internationales Sachsensymposion, held in London, Bruce-Mitford gave a dramatic unveiling of the Royal Armouries replica of the Anglo-Saxon Sutton Hoo helmet. Preceding an evening address, the lights were dimmed; down the aisle came Nigel Williams holding a replica of the Sutton Hoo whetstone; and behind him followed Bruce-Mitford, wearing a carriage rug and with hands hieratically crossed, wearing the helmet and reciting the opening lines of Beowulf.) and the museum published The Sutton Hoo Ship-Burial: A Provisional Guide, which Bruce-Mitford had written and produced during evenings at his kitchen table. The work quickly proved to be one of the museum's most successful publications, going through ten impressions even before the second edition was issued. Also in 1947, in what he later termed "one of the most rewarding experiences of my life", he visited Sweden for six weeks at the invitation of the archaeologist Sune Lindqvist. Bruce-Mitford studied the similar finds from Vendel and Valsgärde and helped Lindqvist excavate the boat-grave from Valsgärde 11, learning Swedish along the way. (Note: Bruce-Mitford also visited Copenhagen in 1951.)

Although Bruce-Mitford continued to write prolifically on Sutton Hoo—he quickly became, in the words of Francis Peabody Magoun, the "spiritus rector of present-day Sutton Hoo research"—a definitive publication remained elusive. Writing a memorandum to Kendrick in May 1949, Bruce-Mitford outlined a plan for "[t]hree large volumes" and possibly a fourth, buttressed by "a formidable array of technical reports obtained at my request from outside scientists", and accompanied by the "hope that the publication will set a new standard in archaeological publication". But he admitted that he could not see "any real prospect of getting the catalogue out the way things are at present". The museum had other needs, and Bruce-Mitford other responsibilities; the country plunged into the Korean War, and resources were diverted elsewhere. In a 1957 addendum to his 1949 memorandum, Bruce-Mitford wrote "[t]here was no reply to this report".

==== Other matters ====
Throughout the 1950s, Bruce-Mitford's attention was directed away from Sutton Hoo. In these "fallow years for Sutton Hoo", as Biddle termed them, germinated many of the other contributions of Bruce-Mitford's career. He began two projects that would result in posthumous publications: excavations at the Mawgan Porth Dark Age Village in Cornwall from 1949 to 1952 (continued in 1954 and 1974), and the compilation of information on Celtic hanging bowls. He undertook another effort in 1955, unsuccessfully searching Lincoln Cathedral with Sir Wilfred Le Gros Clark and Harold Plenderleith for the burial place of Saint Hugh of Lincoln.

Also starting in the 1950s, Bruce-Mitford began to shoulder increasing roles and responsibilities, including deputy keepership of the Department of British and Medieval Antiquities in February 1954, full keepership upon the retirement of A. B. Tonnochy that August, appointment to the Ancient Monuments Board for England that same year (serving until at least 1975), membership in the Museums Association by 1955, and founder and president of the Society for Medieval Archaeology in 1957. In the latter half of the decade Bruce-Mitford became a semi-regular participant in the show Animal, Vegetable, Mineral?, appearing in 1955, 1956, 1958, and 1959. (Note: In 1972, Bruce-Mitford also appeared on Thames TV with Antonia Fraser and Gerald Hugh Tait for the programme "Treasures of the British Museum—The Casual Survivors".) In 1960, he opened an exhibition, "Archaeology from the Air", at the Victoria Galleries in Kingston upon Hull.

This time also saw Bruce-Mitford's primary work on early medieval manuscripts. In 1956 and 1960, he published a two-volume work—facsimile and commentary—on the Lindisfarne Gospels. (Note: On 6 December 1957, Bruce-Mitford had read a paper, "Some Comments on the Miniatures and Ornaments of the Lindisfarne Gospels", as his first presidential address to the Society for Medieval Archaeology. The book itself is frequently catalogued under Kendrick's name, as he is listed first amongst seven authors. Bruce-Mitford was listed third, but contributed most heavily to the work.) The work was his first major publication; the museum gave him four months' leave to focus on the work, including time at the Royal Library in Copenhagen and the Laurentian Library in Florence. The result, according to the journal Antiquity, was "magistral". While at the Laurentian, Bruce-Mitford also studied the c. 700 AD bible known as the Codex Amiatinus, eventually resulting in a Jarrow Lecture on the subject in 1967. (Note: As far back as 1952, Bruce-Mitford was noted as a "fluent and witty speaker".) Around the same time, he translated P. V. Glob's 1965 book The Bog People from Danish to English, with the result published in 1969. (Note: Grahame Clark used a review "to congratulate the translator on making an excellent job". Sir Barry Cunliffe termed the book "splendid", and "attractively translated". He added that "[i]n some places the translator delights in explaining the subtleties of the Danish language", which, per Cunliffe, "adds much to the enjoyment of the work". To John Amyas Alexander, the book was "[w]ritten and translated in a pleasant if rather dramatic style". To Ralph Rowlett, writing in American Anthropologist, the translation was "fluent" but "a sort of linguistic curiosity", with "a slight tendency to over-translate, even in place names".)

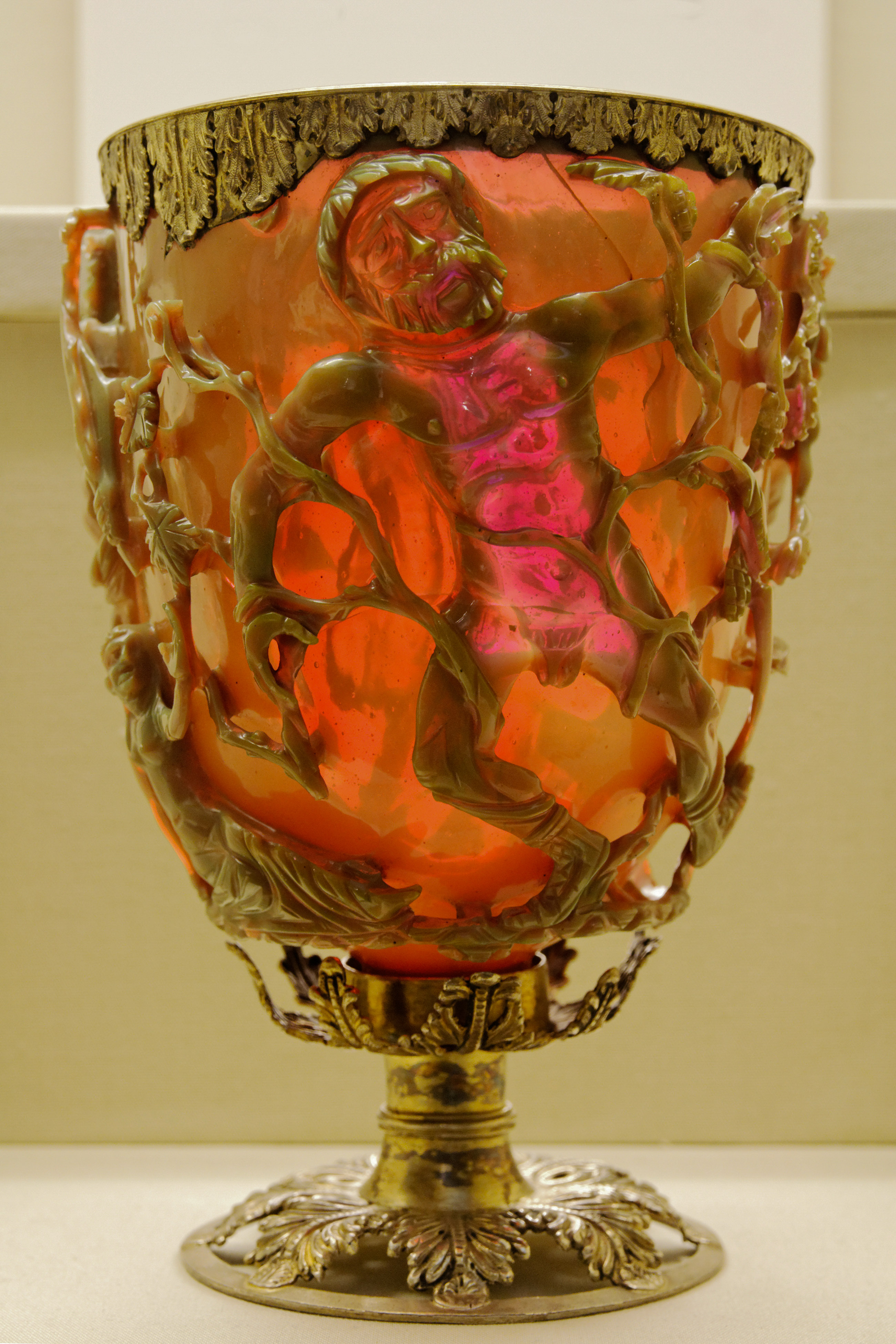
The Lycurgus Cup

Though Bruce-Mitford helped secure acquisitions throughout his 21 years as keeper, two of his most significant efforts came in 1958. That year, the museum purchased the Lycurgus Cup from Victor Rothschild, 3rd Baron Rothschild, for £20,000 (equivalent to £542,000 in 2024). The museum also purchased Courtenay Adrian Ilbert's collection of clocks and watches. This, wrote Biddle, was "the greatest collection of horology in the world", and Bruce-Mitford's "greatest coup". After Ilbert died in 1956, his collection—some 210 clocks and 2,300 watches and watch movements—was set for auction at Christie's. Although the treasury declined a request for funds, Bruce-Mitford approached the Worshipful Company of Clockmakers, which was able to secure a donor to purchase the clocks for the museum. The company then again approached the treasury, the head of which this time agreed to petition parliament for funds to purchase the remainder of the collection. The collection was purchased for the museum, and the company made Bruce-Mitford a liveryman.

Shortly thereafter, in 1960, Bruce-Mitford embarked on an ultimately unsuccessful two-year attempt to acquire what would become known as the Cloisters Cross. The ivory cross, which a panel of experts at the museum declared "one of the finest and most impressive objects of the 12th century they [had] ever seen", appeared at the museum on 5 December 1960, prior to which it was virtually unknown; Bruce-Mitford was alerted by an urgent note that a man had arrived with an ivory cross, and that it was his last day in London. (Note: The note read: "[There is a man] at present over in Manuscripts ... Mr Lasko is very anxious for you to see an object which he has with him — it appears to be a 2' Winchester style morse ivory altar cross, carved back and front. He asks if you could go over there — this is the last day the man will be in London. URGENT.") Bruce-Mitford studied the cross over the ensuing two years—including four days spent in a bank vault in Zurich—assembled a file an inch and a half thick, and successfully persuaded the treasury to allocate £195,000 (equivalent to £5,290,000 in 2024) for its purchase. But as unsavoury rumours swirled around the owner, Ante Topić Mimara, and doubts persisted that the unprovenanced cross might be Nazi loot, Mimara steadfastly refused to disclose how he had obtained possession. With the museum unwilling to pay without this information and Mimara unwilling to disclose it, the museum's option expired at midnight on 31 January 1963. The Metropolitan Museum of Art had been waiting in the wings; its curator Thomas Hoving, untroubled by the issues with the cross and owner, stayed up over dinner with Mimara and purchased it immediately. (Note: Hoving published a book about the acquisition in 1981. In a later telling, he wrote that to acquire the cross for the Cloisters, "I had to conceal some nasty stuff I'd learned about the owner." This included that Mimara had "made off with hundreds of art treasures from what was called the Collecting Point established in Munich after the fall of the Third Reich", a deposit which "contained hundreds of thousands of works of art stolen primarily from Jewish collectors by the Nazis".)

==== Return to Sutton Hoo ====
Frank Francis succeeded Kendrick as director in 1959, and the following year made two floors of a Montague Street house available for Bruce-Mitford to devote to the Sutton Hoo operation. A research assistant was added in 1962 and, eventually, thirteen people were involved. By then, criticism over the delays in publication had begun to mount; a 1964 article by Christopher Hawkes lamented the fact that "[a] quarter of a century has passed ... and Sutton Hoo is still not published", and concluded that the museum "really must go to it". Much of the criticism landed on the shoulders of Bruce-Mitford, leading the archaeologist Robert T. Farrell to observe that "it has become something of a trend to slate Bruce-Mitford for delay". After the volumes were ultimately published, Hawkes and his wife Sonia went as far as to translate, privately publish, and distribute amongst colleagues a biting German review by Joachim Werner. Sir David M. Wilson, who became director of the museum in 1977, disparaged Bruce-Mitford in his 2002 book The British Museum: A History, and wrote that work on the Sutton Hoo volumes "presents a precautionary, if unique, tale of procrastination and obfuscation". (Note: Wilson also wrote that "Rupert Bruce-Mitford was a stubborn and devious man, a scholar of international repute but limited vision, who irritated practically everyone he worked with." He likewise disparaged Bruce-Mitford's work in acquiring the Ilbert collection of clocks and watches—such as by writing that Bruce-Mitford "wrote memorandum after memorandum to the Trustees, until they became heartily sick of them".) To others, including Biddle and Rosemary Cramp, while Bruce-Mitford's perfectionism and penchant for detail did not speed matters, the criticism failed to account for the many other demands on his time, and the museum's delay in making resources available for the publication. Nor, wrote Biddle, did it appreciate the scope of the undertaking, which involved modernising multiple fields of research—such as the proper chronology of Merovingian coins, used to date the burial; the study of textiles; and the study of soil, used to determine whether the burial was a grave or a cenotaph—and the re-excavation of the ship-burial.

From 1965 to 1970, Bruce-Mitford led another round of excavations at Sutton Hoo in order to acquire more information about the mound, the ship, and the burial. Especially given that the original two-week excavation had been an exercise in rescue archaeology, it was hoped that an excavation without the looming spectre of war might discover items or features that had been missed. In 1968, Bruce-Mitford updated the Provisional Guide with a new edition, now entitled The Sutton Hoo Ship-Burial: A Handbook; second and third editions of the Handbook followed in 1972 and 1979. In 1973, he delivered the second G. N. Garmonsway Memorial Lecture at the University of York, speaking on Sutton Hoo, and in 1974, he published Aspects of Anglo-Saxon Archaeology. The book contained twelve updated and rewritten chapters that had appeared elsewhere, along with four new chapters; originally conceived as a reference work which the forthcoming Sutton Hoo publication would cite throughout, it also provided a more high-level overview of certain portions of the burial. (Note: Reviews offered more criticism than praise. A reviewer in Archaeology termed the papers "valuable in themselves", but criticised the number of references to the forthcoming Sutton Hoo publication: "When a major text makes reference to a paper which can be fully understood only through reference back to the still unpublished major text, confusion and irritation result. Let us hope other scholars will not follow the precedent." To Peter Hunter Blair, the book contained "much of interest", but also many misspellings of Anglo-Saxon and Latin text. Tania Dickinson called the publication "an unsatisfactory book"; despite Bruce-Mitford's claim to have "substantially revised and updated" the papers, she said, they had really undergone only "cosmetic surgery on the language and textual adjustment within the original framework". Christopher Hawkes opened his review with "[t]his book gives plenty to relish. Yet it has its unpleasing flavours." He followed this with a page of criticism, closing with "[s]uch are the graceless flavours that I find unpleasing.")

The first volume of The Sutton Hoo Ship-Burial finally appeared in 1975. It focused on the larger issues of the burial—such as the site, the excavations, the ship, the date of the burial, and the questions of whom it honoured, and whether or not it was a cenotaph. The book was widely welcomed; A. J. Taylor, then president of the Society of Antiquaries, hailed the publication as "one of the great books of the century". The book was "splendid", wrote Birgit Arrhenius, and to Biddle, "the firm foundation on which all subsequent work on the site and on the contents of the mound will safely rest". Cramp wrote of "the consistently high standard of argument and presentation" in the work, and even beyond the specific site of Sutton Hoo, the art critic Terence Mullaly suggested the book "sets standards for archaeologists everywhere". The authors and the museum, James Graham-Campbell wrote in Antiquity, "merit every congratulation on the appearance of this first volume".

Also in 1975, Bruce-Mitford relinquished his role as keeper of the Department of British and Medieval Antiquities to spend two years as research keeper. This period was the only time during his career which he was able to devote exclusively to Sutton Hoo. Amidst some internal conflict, some of the museum's trustees, led by Eric Fletcher, Baron Fletcher, sought to terminate the keepership six months early; the effort was thwarted by the advocacy of Sir Grahame Clark and A. J. Taylor, who had seen the first volume of The Sutton Hoo Ship-Burial shortly after printing, and were able to report being "impressed ... by the copiousness and quality of the volume". During this period, in 1976, Bruce-Mitford was also elected a fellow of the British Academy.

The second volume of The Sutton Hoo Ship-Burial, covering arms, armour, and regalia, followed in 1978. The work was again widely praised, with Graham-Campbell calling it a "tour de force", Farrell a "very great accomplishment", and Vera Evison a "mighty effort" with "no sign of limitation on the length of the text or the number and scale of the illustrations". This resulted in what J. N. L. Myres termed an "open-ended approach" that emphasised exploring judgement calls in reconstructions and interpretations rather than presenting conclusions as unimpeachable. The third volume, published in two parts and covering many items including the silver objects, hanging bowls, drinking vessels, textiles, and lyre, came in 1983. (Note: The delay between these volumes was, in large part, attributable to difficulties in production.) Writing of the series as a whole, Farrell termed it "a series which in scope and format is one of the most monumental to have been undertaken in the field of medieval archaeology", Catherine Hills "[a] monument of publication [which] enshrines the original monument", and Myres "a truly heroic achievement in archaeological publishing". Martin Carver, who led research and excavation at Sutton Hoo after Bruce-Mitford, called the publication "the most compendious ever produced for a British archaeological site".

A fourth volume had been planned to offer thoughts on the relationship between Sutton Hoo and Beowulf, the connection between Sutton Hoo and Sweden, studies of comparable materials, and any needed revisions, although its fate was uncertain even after volume one was in press. The plan was ultimately shelved in the face of financial considerations and a desire to focus on facts rather than interpretation. Writing in the preface to the final volume, Bruce-Mitford stated that "the Trustees felt that with the completion of the third volume their essential responsibility to archaeology had been discharged, the factual record being completed with Volume 3". (Note: Writing in 1989, Wilson stated that "it was felt that [a fourth volume] would have been too one-sided and complicated in view of the vast literature on the subject ... Rupert Bruce-Mitford has had his say, not only in the final publication, but also in his book Aspects of Anglo-Saxon Archaeology.")

=== After the British Museum ===
Bruce-Mitford retired from the British Museum after his research keepership ended in 1977. From 1978 to 1979, he served as Slade Professor of Fine Art at the University of Cambridge, and in the same year served as a visiting fellow at All Souls College, Oxford. In 1981, he took his last position at the Australian National University, where he was a faculty visitor in the Department of English. Two years later, he was elected an honorary fellow of Hertford College, his alma mater.

In his years after leaving the British Museum, Bruce-Mitford worked to bring old works to publication. He finished his work on the excavations at Mawgan Porth; the book was published posthumously in 1997. He also resumed work on A Corpus of Late Celtic Hanging-Bowls, on which he had begun work in the 1940s, and which was finished by Shiela Raven and published in 2005. The result, a 500-page tome with 800 illustrations, was reviewed as "a fitting memorial to Dr Bruce-Mitford whose contribution to early medieval archaeology—and to metalwork studies in particular—was immense".

== Personal life ==
Bruce-Mitford was married three times and had three children. In November 1941 he married Kathleen Dent, with whom he fathered Myrtle (b. 1943), Michael (b. 1946), and Miranda (b. 1951). A professional cellist, Myrtle Bruce-Mitford herself contributed to the Sutton Hoo finds, being employed by the British Museum to work on the remnants of the lyre and co-authoring a paper with her father. She was also the longtime partner of Nigel Williams, who from 1970 to 1971 reconstructed the Sutton Hoo helmet.

Bruce-Mitford's relationship with Dent was long troubled, and he left home in the later 1950s (with the marriage officially dissolved in 1972) and formed a series of relationships. In March 1975 he and his former research assistant Marilyn Roberta Luscombe announced their engagement, marrying on 11 July. (Note: Luscombe had undertaken the bulk of editorial work on Bruce-Mitford's 1974 book Aspects of Anglo-Saxon Archaeology, and coauthored with him its eleventh chapter, "The Benty Grange Helmet".) The two had met eight years prior, when Bruce-Mitford was interviewing her for the position; knowing Bruce-Mitford's work but believing him to be dead, Luscomb said she spoke at length about one of his papers before realising she was interviewing with its author. The marriage was dissolved in 1984, at which point Bruce-Mitford found it necessary to sell his library, which went to Okinawa Christian Junior College in Japan. (Note: Six more of Bruce-Mitford's books were auctioned in 1997.) In 1986 he married for a third time, to Margaret Edna Adams, a child psychiatrist and published poet, whom he had met at Oxford fifty years before.

In 1987, Bruce-Mitford visited British Columbia, the homeland of his mother's family. He met cousins living on a reservation there and, Biddle wrote, was "deeply moved" by The Lake, an opera about early life in the Okanagan Valley. Biddle noted that Bruce-Mitford "was fascinated by his family's background" in both British Columbia and Japan; Bruce-Mitford wrote two essays to feature in the 1989 auction catalogue for his library, one of which was titled "My Japanese Background".

After years of inherited heart disease, on 10 March 1994 Bruce-Mitford died of a heart attack at the John Radcliffe Hospital; he had driven himself there two days before. He was buried eight days later by St Mary's Church in Bampton, Oxfordshire. The Guardian recalled him as amongst "that tiny band of scholars whose names are linked with great archaeological discoveries". A service was held at St George's, Bloomsbury on 14 June, with the address given by Biddle. Additional obituaries were published in The Daily Telegraph, The New York Times, The Independent, Old English Newsletter, and Medieval Archaeology. Biddle's memorial address was later published in The Hertford College Magazine, and in 2015 expanded into a bibliographic memoir published by the British Academy. Bruce-Mitford's widow, Margaret Edna Adams, died in 2002.

Bruce-Mitford was a fan of boxing, rugby, and cricket. He was a member of Marylebone Cricket Club, and frequented the Athenaeum and the Garrick. An avid reader of the books of Dick Francis, he was fond of recalling a two-day transcontinental train journey in Australia during which he shared a compartment with the author.

== Publications ==
Many of the works below are listed in the 1989 catalogue of Bruce-Mitford's library produced in preparation for its sale. The first 156 items in the catalogue are works by or about Bruce-Mitford; Bruce-Mitford's personal copy is held by Columbia University's Avery Architectural and Fine Arts Library, and contains 14 additional works added by hand.

=== Books ===
- Bruce-Mitford, Rupert (1947a). The Sutton Hoo Ship-Burial: A Provisional Guide. London: Trustees of the British Museum. OCLC 869758063.
- ——— (2 November 1951). The Society of Antiquaries of London: Notes on its History and Possessions. London: Society of Antiquaries of London. OCLC 1030053915.
- Kendrick, Thomas Downing; Brown, Thomas Julian; Bruce-Mitford, Rupert; Roosen-Runge, Heinz; Ross, Alan Strode Campbell; Stanley, Eric Gerald & Werner, Alfred Emil Anthony, eds. (1956). Codex Lindisfarnensis. Vol. I. Olten: Urs Graf. OCLC 1440544.

- Kendrick, Thomas Downing; Brown, Thomas Julian; Bruce-Mitford, Rupert; Roosen-Runge, Heinz; Ross, Alan Strode Campbell; Stanley, Eric Gerald & Werner, Alfred Emil Anthony, eds. (1960). Codex Lindisfarnensis. Vol. II. Olten: Urs Graf. OCLC 1440544.

- Bruce-Mitford, Rupert (1968). The Sutton Hoo Ship-Burial: A Handbook. London: Trustees of the British Museum. SBN 7141-1320-4.

- ——— (1972). The Sutton Hoo Ship-Burial: A Handbook (2nd ed.). London: Trustees of the British Museum. SBN 7141-1330-1.
- ——— (1979). The Sutton Hoo Ship-Burial: A Handbook (3rd ed.). London: British Museum Publications Ltd. ISBN 0-7141-1343-3.

- Glob, P. V. (1969). The Bog People: Iron Age Man Preserved. Translated by Bruce-Mitford, Rupert. London: Faber and Faber. OCLC 1015925879.

- Published in United States as Glob, P. V. (1969). The Bog People: Iron Age Man Preserved. Translated by Bruce-Mitford, Rupert. Ithaca: Cornell University Press. OCLC 13404.

- Bruce-Mitford, Rupert (1974a). Aspects of Anglo-Saxon Archaeology: Sutton Hoo and Other Discoveries. London: Victor Gollancz Limited. ISBN 0-575-01704-X.

- Published in the United States as ——— (1974a). Aspects of Anglo-Saxon Archaeology: Sutton Hoo and Other Discoveries. New York: Harper's Magazine Press. LCCN 73-13220. SBN 06-120480-3.

- ———, ed. (1975). Recent Archaeological Excavations in Europe. London: Routledge & Kegan Paul. ISBN 0-7100-7963-X.
- ——— (1975). The Sutton Hoo Ship-Burial, Volume 1: Excavations, Background, the Ship, Dating and Inventory. London: British Museum Publications Limited. ISBN 0-7141-1334-4.

- ——— (1978a). The Sutton Hoo Ship-Burial, Volume 2: Arms, Armour and Regalia. London: British Museum Publications. ISBN 0-7141-1335-2.
- ——— (1983a). The Sutton Hoo Ship-Burial, Volume 3: Late Roman and Byzantine Silver, Hanging-Bowls, Drinking Vessels, Cauldrons and Other Containers, Textiles, the Lyre, Pottery Bottle and Other Items. Vol. I. London: British Museum Publications. ISBN 0-7141-0529-5.
- ——— (1983b). The Sutton Hoo Ship-Burial, Volume 3: Late Roman and Byzantine Silver, Hanging-Bowls, Drinking Vessels, Cauldrons and Other Containers, Textiles, the Lyre, Pottery Bottle and Other Items. Vol. II. London: British Museum Publications Limited. ISBN 0-7141-0530-9.

- ——— (1979). The Sutton Hoo Ship-Burial: Reflections After Thirty Years. University of York Medieval Monograph Series. Vol. 2. York: William Sessions. ISBN 0-900657-46-4.
- ——— (1997). Taylor, Robin J. (ed.). Mawgan Porth: A Settlement of the Late Saxon Period on the North Cornish Coast: Excavations 1949–52, 1954 and 1974. London: English Heritage. doi:10.5284/1028203. ISBN 978-1-848-02186-0.
- ——— & Raven, Sheila (2005). A Corpus of Late Celtic Hanging-Bowls with an Account of the Bowls Found in Scandinavia. Oxford: Oxford University Press. ISBN 978-0-19-813410-7.

=== Articles ===
- Bruce-Mitford, Rupert (July 1938). "A Hoard of Neolithic Axes from Peaslake, Surrey". The Antiquaries Journal. XIII (3). London: Society of Antiquaries of London: 279–284. doi:10.1017/S0003581500094737. S2CID 164198113.

- Correction issued in "The Peaslake Hoard". The Antiquaries Journal. XIX (1). London: Society of Antiquaries of London: 94. January 1939. doi:10.1017/S0003581500094907. S2CID 163195581.

- ——— (June 1939). "Two Medieval Pottery Vessels". The British Museum Quarterly. XIII (2). London: The Trustees of the British Museum: 35–38. doi:10.2307/4422140. JSTOR 4422140.
- ——— (1939). "The Archaeology of the Site of the Bodleian Extension in Broad Street, Oxford" (PDF). Oxoniensia. IV. Oxford: Oxfordshire Architectural and Historical Society: 89–146. ISSN 0308-5562.
- ——— (July 1939). "Anglo-Saxon Brooch and Pot from Brixworth, Northants". The Antiquaries Journal. XIX (3). London: Society of Antiquaries of London: 325–326. doi:10.1017/S0003581500095081. S2CID 164096144.
- Skinner, Frederick George & Bruce-Mitford, Rupert (January 1940). "A Celtic Balance-beam of the Christian Period". The Antiquaries Journal. XX (1). London: Society of Antiquaries of London: 87–102. doi:10.1017/S0003581500045595. S2CID 162218406.
- Bruce-Mitford, Rupert (January 1940a). "Medieval Tripod Pitchers". The Antiquaries Journal. XX (1). London: Society of Antiquaries of London: 103–112. doi:10.1017/S0003581500045613. S2CID 162835240.
- ——— (1940b). "The Excavations at Seacourt, Berks, 1939: An Interim Report" (PDF). Oxoniensia. V. Oxford: Oxfordshire Architectural and Historical Society: 31–41. ISSN 0308-5562.
- ——— & Jope, E. M. (1940). "Eleventh and Twelfth Century Pottery from the Oxford Region" (PDF). Oxoniensia. V. Oxford: Oxfordshire Architectural and Historical Society: 42–49. ISSN 0308-5562.
- ——— (September 1946). "Sutton Hoo Ship-Burial". East Anglian Magazine. 6 (1): 2–9, 43. ISSN 0012-8392.
- Myres, J. N. L.; Hawkes, C. F. C.; Bruce-Mitford, Rupert & Radford, C. A. Ralegh (1946). "The Archaeology of Lincolnshire and Lincoln: Anglian and Anglo-Danish Lincolnshire" (PDF). The Archaeological Journal. CIII. London: The Royal Archaeological Institute of Great Britain and Ireland: 85–101. doi:10.1080/00665983.1946.10853806.
- Bruce-Mitford, Rupert (January 1947b). "Swedish Museums and the Public". The Museums Journal. 46 (10). London: The Museums Association: 188–194. ISSN 0027-416X.
- ——— (June 1947). "Anglo-American Museums Officers Visit to Finland (September–October, 1946)". The Museums Journal. 47 (3). London: The Museums Association: 41–51. ISSN 0027-416X.
- ——— (1948). "Saxon Rendlesham: Some Preliminary Considerations" (PDF). Proceedings of the Suffolk Institute of Archaeology. XXIV (3). Ipswich: 228–251. Archived (PDF) from the original on 19 February 2016.

- Edited and republished in Bruce-Mitford 1974a, ch. 2

- ——— (1948). "Sutton Hoo och Sverige". Ord och Bild. 57. Stockholm: Sven Rinman: 97–104.
- ——— (May 1948). "Sutton Hoo and Sweden". The Archaeological News Letter. 1 (2). Linden Publicity: 5–7. ISSN 0003-8040.
- Lindqvist, Sune (September 1948). "Sutton Hoo and Beowulf". Antiquity. XXII (87). Translated by Bruce-Mitford, Rupert. Gloucester: John Bellows Ltd.: 131–140. doi:10.1017/S0003598X00019669. S2CID 164075295.
- Bruce-Mitford, Rupert (October 1948). "Medieval Archaeology". The Archaeological News Letter. 1 (6). Linden Publicity: 1–4. ISSN 0003-8040.
- ——— (November–December 1948). "The Sutton Hoo Ship-Burial". The Norseman. VI (6): 394–400. OCLC 1760471.
- ——— (1949). "The Sutton Hoo Ship-Burial: Recent Theories and Some Comments on General Interpretation" (PDF). Proceedings of the Suffolk Institute of Archaeology. XXV (1). Ipswich: 1–78.

- Summarised, with Bruce-Mitford's input, in Crawford, O. G. S. (March 1952). "Sutton Hoo? A Summary". Antiquity. XXVI (101): 4–8. doi:10.1017/S0003598X00021232. S2CID 246041741.
- Edited and republished in Bruce-Mitford 1974a, ch. 1

- Bruce-Mitford, Rupert (1950). "The Sutton Hoo Ship-Burial". Proceedings of the Royal Institution of Great Britain. XXXIV (III). London: The Royal Institution of Great Britain: 440–449. ISSN 0035-8959.
- ——— & Hill, George Francis (January–April 1950). "A Note by Sir George Hill on the Sutton Hoo Treasure Trove Inquest". The Antiquaries Journal. XXX (1–2). London: Society of Antiquaries of London: 67–68. doi:10.1017/S0003581500088193. S2CID 163275205.
- ——— (March 1950). "The Problem of the Sutton Hoo Cenotaph". The Archaeological News Letter. 2 (10). Linden Publicity: 166–169. ISSN 0003-8040.
- ——— (4 March 1950). "The Sutton Hoo Ship-Burial". Nature. CLXV (4192). Nature Publishing Group: 339–341. Bibcode:1950Natur.165..339B. doi:10.1038/165339a0.
- ——— (April 1950). "The Sutton Hoo Ship-Burial: A New Chapter in Anglo-Swedish Relations". The Anglo-Swedish Review. London: The Swedish Chamber of Commerce for the United Kingdom: 69–72. OCLC 51228631.
- ——— (October–November 1950). "3rd International Congress of Prehistoric and Protohistoric Sciences, Zurich, August 14th to 19th, 1950". The Archaeological News Letter. 3 (5). Linden Publicity: 78–79. ISSN 0003-8040.
- ——— (1951). "Anglo-Saxon Suffolk" (PDF). The Archaeological Journal. CVIII. Royal Archaeological Institute: 132–133.
- ——— (1951). "A Late-Medieval Chalk-Mine at Thetford" (PDF). Norfolk Archaeology. XXX (III). Norwich: Norfolk and Norwich Archæological Society: 220–222.
- ——— (January–April 1951). "A Saxon Jewelled Circular Brooch from Long Bennington, Lincs". The Antiquaries Journal. XXXI (1–2). London: Society of Antiquaries of London: 67–68. doi:10.1017/S0003581500058005. S2CID 163358427.
- ——— (March 1951). "The Sutton Hoo Ship-Burial". The American-Scandinavian Review. XXXIX (1). Princeton, New Jersey: The American-Scandinavian Foundation: 27–32. ISSN 0003-0910.
- ——— (April 1951). "The Sutton Hoo Ship-Burial". Scientific American. 184 (4): 24–30. Bibcode:1951SciAm.184d..24B. doi:10.1038/scientificamerican0451-24. JSTOR 24945139. S2CID 45498190.
- ——— (1952). "An Anglo-Saxon Gold Pendant from High Wycombe, Bucks". The British Museum Quarterly. XV. London: The Trustees of the British Museum: 72. doi:10.2307/4422266. JSTOR 4422266.
- ——— (1952). "The Castle Eden Vase". The British Museum Quarterly. XV. London: The Trustees of the British Museum: 73. doi:10.2307/4422267. JSTOR 4422267.
- ——— (1952). "A Late Saxon Disk-Brooch and Sword Pommel". The British Museum Quarterly. XV. London: The Trustees of the British Museum: 74–75. doi:10.2307/4422268. JSTOR 4422268.
- ——— (1952). "Other Dark-Age Acquisitions". The British Museum Quarterly. XV. London: The Trustees of the British Museum: 75–76. doi:10.2307/4422395. JSTOR 4422269.
- ——— (1952). "A Medieval Polychrome Pottery Aquamanile from Stonar, Kent". The British Museum Quarterly. XV. London: The Trustees of the British Museum: 80–81. doi:10.2307/4422275. JSTOR 4422275.
- ——— & King, William (1952). "Medieval Pottery, Tiles, and Glass". The British Museum Quarterly. XV. London: The Trustees of the British Museum: 81–82. doi:10.2307/4422276. JSTOR 4422276.
- ——— (June 1952). "A Late-Saxon Silver Disk-Brooch from the Isle of Ely". The British Museum Quarterly. XVII (1). London: The Trustees of the British Museum: 15–16. doi:10.2307/4422367. JSTOR 4422367.
- ——— & Allan, John (June 1952). "Sutton Hoo—A Rejoinder: With a Note on the Coins". Antiquity. XXVI (102): 76–82. doi:10.1017/S0003598X00023619. S2CID 163980192.
- ——— (December 1952). "The Fuller Brooch". The British Museum Quarterly. XVII (4). London: The Trustees of the British Museum: 75–76. doi:10.2307/4422395. JSTOR 4422395.
- ——— (1952). "The Snape Boat-Grave" (PDF). Proceedings of the Suffolk Institute of Archaeology. XXVI (1). Ipswich: 1–26.

- Edited and republished in Bruce-Mitford 1974a, ch. 3

- ——— (1952–1953). "A Bronze Strap-End of c. A. D. 900 from Souldern, Oxon" (PDF). Oxoniensia. XVII–XVIII. Oxford: Oxfordshire Architectural and Historical Society: 236. ISSN 0308-5562.
- ——— (January 1954). "A Late- or Sub-Roman Buckle-Plate from College Wood, near Winchester". The Antiquaries Journal. XXXIV (1–2). London: Society of Antiquaries of London: 75–76. doi:10.1017/S0003581500073224. S2CID 163239398.
- Tonnochy, A. B.; Brailsford, J. W.; Bruce-Mitford, Rupert & King, William (June 1954). "British and Medieval Antiquities, 1753–1953". The British Museum Quarterly. XIX (1). London: The Trustees of the British Museum: 18–27. doi:10.2307/4422462. JSTOR 4422462.
- Bruce-Mitford, Rupert (1955). "Gold and Silver Cloisonné Buckle from Wynaldum, Friesland". Verslag van het Fries Genootschap van Geschied-, Oudheid- en Taalkunde. 126. Leeuwarden: Friesch Genootschap van Geschied-, Oudheid- en Taalkunde: 16–17. OCLC 73136678.

- Edited and republished in Bruce-Mitford 1974a, pp. 270–273

- ——— (1955). "Recent Studies of Late Saxon Metalwork". Transactions of the Lancashire and Cheshire Antiquarian Society. LXV. Manchester: Lancashire and Cheshire Antiquarian Society: 134–135. ISSN 0950-4699.
- ——— (October 1955). "Edward Thurlow Leeds". Obituary. The Museums Journal. 55 (7). London: The Museums Association: 189–190. ISSN 0027-416X.
- ——— (1956). "The Benty Grange Helmet". Annual Report for the Year Ending 31st March 1956. Sheffield: Sheffield City Museum. pp. 13–15. OCLC 694999446.
- ——— (January 1956). "National Museums and Local Material". The Museums Journal. 55 (10). London: The Museums Association: 251–258. ISSN 0027-416X.
- ——— (July 1957). "A Medieval Polychrome Jug from the City of London". The British Museum Quarterly. XXI (2). London: The Trustees of the British Museum: 54–55. doi:10.2307/4422573. JSTOR 4422573.
- Andrew O'Dell, Andrew; Bruce-Mitford, Rupert; Stevenson, Robert B. K.; Plenderleith, Harold James & Brown, Thomas Julian (December 1959). "The St Ninian's Isle Silver Hoard". Antiquity. XXXIII (132): 257–268. doi:10.1017/S0003598X00027654. S2CID 163046639.
- Bruce-Mitford, Rupert (November 1960). "The Treasure of St. Ninian's". Scientific American. 203 (5): 154–166. Bibcode:1960SciAm.203e.154B. doi:10.1038/scientificamerican1160-154. JSTOR 24940701.
- ——— (June 1961). "The Book of Kells Exhibition". Museums Journal. 61 (1). London: The Museums Association: 7–20. ISSN 0027-416X.
- ——— (1963). "The Early Gospel-Book in the British Isles, with Special Reference to the Gospels of St. Chad". Annual Report. 30. Llandaff, Wales: Friends of Llandaff Cathedral: 16–19. OCLC 896111779.
- ——— (1964). "Excavations at Sutton Hoo in 1938" (PDF). Proceedings of the Suffolk Institute of Archaeology. XXX (1). Ipswich: 1–43.
- ——— (1964a). "A National Reference Collection of Medieval Pottery" (PDF). Medieval Archaeology. 8. London: The Society for Medieval Archaeology: 229–230. doi:10.5284/1000320.
- ——— (September 1964). "A Hiberno-Saxon Bronze Mounting from Markyate, Hertfordshire". Antiquity. XXXVIII (151). Cambridge: Antiquity Publications Ltd.: 219–220. doi:10.1017/S0003598X00105095.
- ——— (December 1964c). "National Reference Collection of Medieval Pottery". Antiquity. XXXVIII (152). Cambridge: Antiquity Publications Ltd.: 303–304. doi:10.1017/S0003598X00108270. S2CID 246047709.
- ——— (February 1965). "Sutton Hoo and Sweden". The Anglo-Swedish Review (1). London: The Swedish Chamber of Commerce for the United Kingdom: 20–22. OCLC 51228631.
- ——— (Summer 1965). "The Lindisfarne Gospels in the Middle Ages and Later". The British Museum Quarterly. XXIX (3–4). London: The Trustees of the British Museum: 98–100. doi:10.2307/4422900. JSTOR 4422900.
- ——— (September 1966). "Archaeology: A National Museum Viewpoint". The Relationship of National and Provincial Museums. Museums Journal. 66 (2). London: The Museums Association: 99–106. ISSN 0027-416X.
- ——— (1967). "A New Wooden Ship's Figure-Head Found in the Scheldt, at Moerzeke-Mariekerke". Miscellanea. Acta Archaeologica. XXXVIII: 199–209. ISSN 0065-101X.

- Edited and republished in Bruce-Mitford 1974a, ch. 6

- ——— (4 November 1967). "Sutton Hoo Revisited". Archaeological Section No 2277. The Illustrated London News. Vol. 251, no. 6692. London. pp. 26–27. ISSN 0019-2422.
- ——— (March 1968). "Sutton Hoo". Gypsum Journal (47). London: The Gypsum Plasterboard Development Association: 11–14. OCLC 21731710.
- ——— (March 1968). "Sutton Hoo Excavations, 1965–7". Antiquity. XLII (165). Cambridge: Antiquity Publications Ltd.: 36–39. doi:10.1017/S0003598X00033810. S2CID 163655331.

- Edited and republished in Bruce-Mitford 1974a, ch. 5

- ——— (December 1968). "Fresh Observations on the Torslunda Plates". Frühmittelalterliche Studien. 2. Münster: 233–236. doi:10.1515/9783110242027.233. S2CID 185602132.

- Edited and republished in Bruce-Mitford 1974a, ch. 10

- ——— (1969). "The Art of the Codex Amiatinus: Jarrow Lecture 1967". Journal of the British Archaeological Association. XXXII: 1–25. doi:10.1080/00681288.1969.11894883.

- Also published as a hardcover offprint. See OCLC 926900345, 7214133300

- ——— (1969). "The Ruined Church of Stone-by-Faversham: Appendix III, The Amber Pendant". The Antiquaries Journal. XLIX (2). London: Society of Antiquaries of London: 292–293. doi:10.1017/S0003581500053798. S2CID 161808688.
- ——— & Bruce-Mitford, Myrtle (March 1970). "The Sutton Hoo Lyre, Beowulf, and the Origins of the Frame Harp". Antiquity. XLIV (173). Cambridge: Antiquity Publications Ltd.: 7–13. doi:10.1017/S0003598X00040916.

- Edited and republished in Bruce-Mitford 1974a, ch. 7

- ——— (June 1970). "Ships' Figure-heads in the Migration Period and Early Middle Ages". Antiquity. XLIV (174). Cambridge: Antiquity Publications Ltd.: 146–148. doi:10.1017/S0003598X00104764. S2CID 163282907.

- Edited and republished in Bruce-Mitford 1974a, ch. 6

- ——— (Spring 1971). "Envoi". The British Museum Quarterly. XXXV (1–4). London: The Trustees of the British Museum: 8–16. doi:10.2307/4423066. JSTOR 4423066.
- ——— (Autumn 1972). "The Sutton Hoo Helmet: A New Reconstruction". The British Museum Quarterly. XXXVI (3–4). London: The Trustees of the British Museum: 120–130. doi:10.2307/4423116. JSTOR 4423116.

- Edited and republished in Bruce-Mitford 1974a, ch. 8

- ——— (February 1973). "Sutton Hoo Drinking Horns". The British Museum Society Bulletin (12): 20. ISSN 0525-5260.
- ——— (1974b). "Exhibits at Ballots: 5. A Replica of the Sutton Hoo Helmet Made in the Tower Armouries, 1973". The Antiquaries Journal. LIV (2). London: Society of Antiquaries of London: 285–286. doi:10.1017/S0003581500042529. S2CID 246055329.
- ——— (1974c). "Exhibits at Ballots: 6. Anglo-Saxon Gold Sword Mount from Maidstone, Kent". The Antiquaries Journal. LIV (2). London: Society of Antiquaries of London: 286. doi:10.1017/S0003581500042529. S2CID 246055329.
- ——— (February 1974d). "The Sutton Hoo Helmet". The British Museum Society Bulletin (15): 6–7. ISSN 0525-5260.
  - Edited and republished in Bruce-Mitford 1974b
- ——— (March 1975). "New Galleries for Medieval and Later Antiquities". The British Museum Society Bulletin (18): 6–7. ISSN 0525-5260.
- ——— (1977). "Obituary: Basil Brown" (PDF). Proceedings of the Suffolk Institute of Archaeology. XXXIV (1). Ipswich: 71.
- ——— (January 1978b). "The Archaeologist". Antique Collector. 49 (1). London: National Magazine Company LTD.: 68–69.
- ——— (1980). "Obituary: Leslie Dow, F.S.A" (PDF). Proceedings of the Suffolk Institute of Archaeology. XXXIV (4). Ipswich: 287–288.
- ——— (December 1982). "The Sutton Hoo Helmet-Reconstruction and the Design of the Royal Harness and Sword-Belt: A Reply to Hofrat Dr. Ortwin Gamber with Some Additional Comments on the Sutton Hoo Arms and Armour". The Journal of the Arms & Armour Society. X (6). London: 217–274. ISSN 0004-2439.
  - Response to: Gamber, Ortwin (December 1982). "Some Notes on the Sutton Hoo Military Equipment". The Journal of the Arms & Armour Society. X (6). London: 208–216. ISSN 0004-2439.
- Bruce-Mitford, Rupert (1989a). "Early Thoughts on Sutton Hoo". Saxon (10). Woodbridge, Suffolk: The Sutton Hoo Society.
- ——— (1989b). Anglo-Saxon and Mediaeval Archaeology, History and Art, with Special Reference to Sutton Hoo: The Highly Important Working Library and Archive of More than 6,000 Titles Formed by Dr. Rupert L.S. Bruce-Mitford FBA, D.Litt., FSA. Wickmere: Merrion Book Co. OCLC 858531182.
  - Includes prefatory essays My Japanese Background and Forty Years with Sutton Hoo by Bruce-Mitford.

=== Chapters ===
- Bruce-Mitford, Rupert (1952). "The Sutton Hoo Ship-Burial". In Hodgkin, Robert Howard (ed.). A History of the Anglo-Saxons. Vol. II (3rd ed.). London: Oxford University Press. pp. 696–734, 750–756.

- Footnote 21 edited and republished in Bruce-Mitford 1974a, ch. 9

- ——— (1953). "Some Recent Results of the Application of Laboratory Technique to Antiquities of the Anglo-Saxon Period in Britain". In Vogt, Emil (ed.). Actes de la III^{e} session: Zurich, 1950. Zurich: Congrès International des Sciences Préhistoriques et Protohistoriques. pp. 321–323. OCLC 797756211.
- ——— (1954). "Preface". In Lasko, Peter (ed.). Catalogue of an Exhibition of Ivory Carvings Lent by the City of Liverpool Public Museums, Mostly from the Mayer-Fejervary Collection. London: Trustees of the British Museum. p. 3. OCLC 30175308.
- ———, ed. (1956). Recent Archaeological Excavations in Britain: Selected Excavations 1939–1955 with a Chapter on Recent Air-Reconnaissance. New York: Macmillan.
  - Contains ——— (1956). "A Dark-Age Settlement at Mawgan Porth, Cornwall". In Bruce-Mitford, Rupert (ed.). Recent Archaeological Excavations in Britain: Selected Excavations 1939–1955 with a Chapter on Recent Air-Reconnaissance. New York: Macmillan. pp. 167–196.
    - Briefly summarised in Griffiths, W. E. (May 1955). "The Second Viking Congress". The Archaeological News Letter. 5 (1). Linden Publicity: 17–19. ISSN 0003-8040.
  - Contains ——— (1956). "Treasure Trove: A Note on Law and Practice". In Bruce-Mitford, Rupert (ed.). Recent Archaeological Excavations in Britain: Selected Excavations 1939–1955 with a Chapter on Recent Air-Reconnaissance. New York: Macmillan. pp. 297–301.
- ——— & Harden, Donald Benjamin (1956). "Edward Thurlow Leeds: 1877–1955". In Harden, Donald Benjamin (ed.). Dark-Age Britain: Studies Presented to E. T. Leeds with a Bibliography of His Works. London: Methuen & Co. Ltd. pp. ix–xvi. OCLC 30193045.
- ——— (1956). "Late Saxon Disc-Brooches". In Harden, Donald Benjamin (ed.). Dark-Age Britain: Studies Presented to E. T. Leeds with a Bibliography of His Works. London: Methuen & Co. Ltd. pp. 171–201. OCLC 30193045.

- Republished in part in Bruce-Mitford 1964b, app'x B
- Edited and republished in Bruce-Mitford 1974a, ch. 15

- ——— (1956). "The Pectoral Cross". In Battiscombe, Christopher Francis (ed.). The Relics of Saint Cuthbert. Oxford: Oxford University Press. pp. 308–325, 542–544. OCLC 4071903.
- ——— (1964). "Preface & Appendix B: Iconography of the Fuller Brooch". In Wilson, David M. (ed.). Anglo-Saxon Ornamental Metalwork 700–1100. Catalogue of Antiquities of the Later Saxon Period. Vol. I. London: The Trustees of the British Museum. pp. v, 91–98. OCLC 886634250.
- ——— (1967). "The Reception by the Anglo-Saxons of Mediterranean Art Following their Conversion from Ireland to Rome". La conversione al Cristianesimo nell'Europa dell'Alto Medioevo: 14–19 aprile 1966. Settimane di studio del Centro italiano di studi sull'alto Medioevo. Vol. XIV. Spoleto: Centro Italiano di Studi sull'Alto Medioevo. pp. 797–825. OCLC 1115912.
- ——— (1967). "The Lindisfarne Gospels". Great Books of Ireland: Thomas Davis Lectures. Dublin: Clonmore & Reynolds Ltd. pp. 26–37. OCLC 20194.
- ——— (1970). "Preface". In Grohskopf, Bernice (ed.). The Treasure of Sutton Hoo. New York: Atheneum. pp. vii–x. LCCN 74-86555.
- ——— (1971). "Medieval and Later Antiquities". In Francis, Frank (ed.). Treasures of the British Museum. London: Thames & Hudson. pp. 179–209. ISBN 0-500-18125-X.
- ——— (1971). "Sutton Hoo and the Background to the Poem". In Girvan, Ritchie (ed.). Beowulf and the Seventh Century: Language and Content (2nd ed.). London: Methuen & Co. Ltd. pp. 85–98.

- Edited and republished in Bruce-Mitford 1974a, ch. 12

- ——— (1972). "The Dating of the Sutton Hoo Coins: Some Comments". In Hall, E. T. & Metcalf, David Michael (eds.). Methods of Chemical and Metallurgical Investigation of Ancient Coinage: A Symposium Held by the Royal Numismatic Society at Burlington House, London on 9-11 December 1970. Royal Numismatic Society Special Publication. Vol. 8. London: Royal Numismatic Society. pp. 108–109. OCLC 962994865.
- ——— (1976). "The Chapter House Vestibule Graves at Lincoln and the Body of St. Hugh of Avalon". In Emmison, Frederick & Stephens, Roy (eds.). Tribute to an Antiquary: Essays Presented to Marc Fitch by Some of His Friends. London: Leopard's Head Press. pp. 127–140. ISBN 0-904920-00-3.
- ——— (1976). "Excavation at the Sutton Hoo Site, England, 1969". In Oehser, Paul Henry (ed.). Abstracts and Reviews of Research and Exploration Authorized Under Grants from the National Geographic Society During the Year 1968. National Geographic Society Research Reports. Vol. 9. Washington, D.C.: National Geographic Society. pp. 49–52. LCCN 68-26794. SBN 87044-136-1.
- ——— (1978). "A Comparison Between the Sutton Hoo Burial Deposit and Childeric's Treasure". Actes du Colloque International d'Archéologie, Rouen 3-4-5 Juillet 1975: La Période Mérovingienne. Vol. III. Rouen: Musée départemental des antiquités de Seine-Maritime. pp. 365–372. OCLC 633625288.
- ——— (1978). "La Matériel archéologique de la sépulture royale de Sutton Hoo (Grand-Bretagne, Suffolk): dernier bilan des recherches" [The archaeological material of the royal burial of Sutton Hoo (Great Britain, Suffolk): latest research report]. In Fleury, Michel & Périn, Patrick (eds.). Problèmes de chronologie relative et absolue concernant les cimetières mérovingiens d'entre Loire et Rhin: Actes du II^{e} colloque archéologique de la IV^{e} Section de l'Ecole pratique des Hautes Etudes (Paris, 1973) [Problems of relative and absolute chronology concerning the Merovingian cemeteries between Loire and Rhine: Proceedings of the 2nd archaeological colloquium of the 4th Section of the École pratique des hautes études (Paris, 1973)]. Bibliothèque de l'Ecole des hautes études: IV^{e} Section — Sciences historiques et philologiques (in French). Vol. 326. Paris: Librairie Honoré Champion. pp. 13–17. OCLC 932310155.
- ——— & Wilson, David M. (1979). "Die Angelsachsen" [The Anglo-Saxons]. In Roth, Helmut (ed.). Kunst der Völkerwanderungszeit [Art of the Migration Period]. Propyläen Kunstgeschichte: Supplementbänd (in German). Vol. IV. Berlin: Propyläen Verlag. pp. 206–222. OCLC 1078702695.
- ——— (1986). "The Sutton Hoo Ship-Burial: Some Foreign Connections". Angli e Sassoni al di qua e al di là del mare: 26 aprile-lo maggio 1984, tomo primo. Settimane di studio del Centro italiano di studi sull'alto Medioevo. Vol. XXXII. Spoleto: Centro italiano di studi sull'alto Medioevo. pp. 171–210.
- ——— (1987). "Ireland and the Hanging Bowls—A Review". In Ryan, Michael (ed.). Ireland and Insular Art, A.D. 500–1200: Proceedings of a Conference at University College Cork, 31 October-3 November 1985. Dublin: Royal Irish Academy. pp. 30–39. ISBN 0-901714-54-2.
- ——— (1989). "The Durham-Echternach Calligrapher". In Bonner, Gerald; Rollason, David & Stancliffe, Clare (eds.). St Cuthbert, His Cult and His Community to AD 1200. Woodbridge, Suffolk: The Boydell Press. pp. 175–188. ISBN 0-85115-510-3. LCCN 88-16805.
- ——— (1991). "Thomas Downing Kendrick: 1895–1979" (PDF). Lectures and Memoirs. Proceedings of the British Academy. Vol. 76. Oxford: Oxford University Press. pp. 445–471. ISBN 0-19-726107-8. ISSN 0068-1202.

=== Reviews ===
- Bruce-Mitford, Rupert (1945). "Review of London Museum Catalogues, No. 7: Medieval Catalogue" (PDF). The Archaeological Journal. CII. London: The Royal Archaeological Institute of Great Britain and Ireland: 173–174. doi:10.5284/1018054.
- ——— (November 1948). "Review of Medieval English Pottery, by Bernard Rackham". The Archaeological News Letter. 1 (7). Linden Publicity: 7. ISSN 0003-8040.
- ——— (June 1949). "Review of Essai sur les Origines de la Miniature Dite Irlandaise, by François Masai". New Books Reviewed. The Connoisseur. CXXIII (512): 126. ISSN 0010-6275.
- ——— (August 1949). "Review of Late Saxon and Viking Art, by T. D. Kendrick". The Archaeological News Letter. 2 (4). Linden Publicity: 61–62. ISSN 0003-8040.
- ——— (January–April 1950). "Review of Nubian Treasure, by Walter B. Emery". The Antiquaries Journal. XXX (1–2). London: Society of Antiquaries of London: 76–80. doi:10.1017/S0003581500088259. S2CID 163791671.
- ——— (September 1950). "Review of Merowingerzeit, by Gustav Behrens". Antiquity. XXIV (95). Gloucester: John Bellows Ltd.: 163–164. doi:10.1017/S0003598X00023243. S2CID 162972699.

- Republished with edits in ——— (June 1951). "Review of Merowingerzeit, by Gustav Behrens". Antiquity. XXV (98). Gloucester: John Bellows Ltd.: 107–108. doi:10.1017/S0003598X00021001.

- ——— (December 1950). "Review of Culture in Early Anglo-Saxon England, by D. Elizabeth Martin-Clarke". Antiquity. XXIV (96). Gloucester: John Bellows Ltd.: 211–212. doi:10.1017/S0003598X00023462. S2CID 163141521.
- ——— (August 1951). "Review of The Coffin of Saint Cuthbert, by Donald McIntyre". The Burlington Magazine. XCIII (581): 274. JSTOR 870757.
- ——— (29 May 1952). "Review of Pre-Conquest England and Byzantium, by David Talbot Rice". Summer Books. The Listener. Vol. XLVII, no. 1213. London: The British Broadcasting Corporation. p. 879.
- ——— (14 May 1954). "Boats of the North". History. The Times Literary Supplement. No. 2728. London. p. 314. Archived from the original on 9 May 2023.
- ——— (July–October 1954). "Review of Der Tassilokelch, by Gunther Haseloff". The Antiquaries Journal. XXXIV (3–4). London: Society of Antiquaries of London: 245–246. doi:10.1017/S0003581500060042. S2CID 162310675.
- ——— (July–October 1954). "Review of Die langobardischen Fibeln aus Italien, by Siegfried Fuchs and Joachim Werner". The Antiquaries Journal. XXXIV (3–4). London: Society of Antiquaries of London: 246–247. doi:10.1017/S0003581500060054. S2CID 163720738.
- ——— (July–October 1954). "Review of Das Alamannische Gräberfeld von Bülach, by Joachim Werner". The Antiquaries Journal. XXXIV (3–4). London: Society of Antiquaries of London: 247. doi:10.1017/S0003581500060066. S2CID 162670894.
- ——— (December 1954). "Review of The English Windmill, by Rex Wailes". The Archaeological News Letter. 5 (7). Linden Publicity: 128. ISSN 0003-8040.
- ——— (January–April 1956). "Review of Oreficerie Langobarde a Parma, by Giorgio Monaco". The Antiquaries Journal. XXXVI (1–2). London: Society of Antiquaries of London: 99–100. doi:10.1017/S0003581500060595. S2CID 162256332.
- ——— (January–April 1957). "Review of Fynske Jernaldergrave II: Ældre romersk jernalder, by Erling Albrechtsen". The Antiquaries Journal. XXXVII (1–2). London: Society of Antiquaries of London: 79–80. doi:10.1017/S0003581500077441. S2CID 162911783.
- ——— (1958). "Review of Early Christian Ireland, by Máire and Liam de Paor" (PDF). Medieval Archaeology. 2. London: The Society for Medieval Archaeology: 214–217. doi:10.5284/1000320.
- ——— (September 1959). "Review of The Beginnings of Christian Art, by David Talbot Rice". Antiquity. XXXIII (131): 226–227. doi:10.1017/S0003598X00027551. S2CID 163981765.
- ——— (1962). "Review of The Sword in Anglo-Saxon England: Its Archaeology and Literature, by Hilda Ellis Davidson" (PDF). The Archaeological Journal. CXIX. London: The Royal Archaeological Institute: 367. doi:10.5284/1018054.
- ——— (1962). "Review of Excavations at Helgö, I: Report for 1954–1956, edited by Wilhelm Holmqvist in collaboration with Birgit Arrhenius and Per Lundström". The Antiquaries Journal. XLII (1). London: Society of Antiquaries of London: 99–100. doi:10.1017/S000358150002415X.
- ——— (June 1962). "Review of Archäologische Denkmäler der Gepiden im Mitteldonaubecken (454–568 u. Z.), by Dezsö Csallány". Museums Journal. 62 (1). London: The Museums Association: 354–355. ISSN 0027-416X.
- ——— (1962–1963). "Review of Ladby-Skibet, by Knud Thorvildsen" (PDF). Medieval Archaeology. 6–7. Society for Medieval Archaeology: 353–356. doi:10.5284/1000320.
- ——— (22 February 1963). "The Third Great Codex: The Book of Durrow's Place in the Celtic World". The Times Literary Supplement. No. 3182. London. p. 143. Archived from the original on 9 October 2023.
- ——— (1965). "Review of The Fifth Century Invasions South of the Thames, by Vera Evison". The Archaeological Journal. CXXII. London: The Royal Archaeological Institute: 247–249. doi:10.1080/00665983.1965.11077377.
- ——— (1967). "Review of Three Viking Graves in the Isle of Man, by Gerhard Bersu and David M. Wilson" (PDF). Medieval Archaeology. 11. Society for Medieval Archaeology: 332–334. doi:10.5284/1000320.
- ——— (28 May 1971). "Topographical Past". History. The Times Literary Supplement. No. 3613. London. p. 612. Archived from the original on 9 October 2023.
- ——— (August 1971). "Review of Early Celtic Art, by Paul Jacobstahl". The Burlington Magazine. CXIII (821): 478. JSTOR 876721.
- ——— (1975). "Review of Britain before the Norman Conquest". The Antiquaries Journal. LV (1). London: Society of Antiquaries of London: 155. doi:10.1017/S0003581500035733. S2CID 162394640.
- ——— (1985). "Review of Vendel Period Studies: Transactions of the Boat-grave Symposium, Stockholm, 1981, edited by Jan Peder Lamm and Hans-Åke Nordström" (PDF). Medieval Archaeology. 29. Society for Medieval Archaeology: 231–233. doi:10.1080/00766097.1985.11735471.
- ——— (4 January 1985). "The Age of the Cross". Art History. The Times Literary Supplement. No. 4266. London. p. 21. Archived from the original on 4 April 2023.
- ——— (1986). "Review of Corpus of Anglo-Saxon Sculpture in England, Vol. I: County Durham and Northumberland, by Rosemary Cramp". The Antiquaries Journal. LXVI (1). London: Society of Antiquaries of London: 179–181. doi:10.1017/S0003581500085000.
- ——— (1988). "Review of The Sutton Hoo Ship Burial, by Angela Care Evans". The Antiquaries Journal. LXVIII (2). London: Society of Antiquaries of London: 356–357. doi:10.1017/S0003581500069882. S2CID 163211667.
- ——— (1988). "Review of From Durrow to Kells: The Insular Gospel-Books 650–800, by George Henderson". The Antiquaries Journal. LXVIII (2). London: Society of Antiquaries of London: 359–360. doi:10.1017/S0003581500069912. S2CID 161482786.
- ——— (11 November 1988). "The Sign of the Cross". Archaeology. The Times Literary Supplement. No. 4467. London. p. 1256.
- ——— (1993). "Review of The Origins of Beowulf and the Pre-Viking Kingdom of East Anglia, by Sam Newton". The Antiquaries Journal. LXXIII. London: Society of Antiquaries of London: 210–211. doi:10.1017/S0003581500071985. S2CID 164034442.

=== Other ===
- Sheppard, Thomas (February 1940). "Saxon Remains at Barton, Part II". The Naturalist (997). London: A. Brown & Sons, Ltd.: 37–47.

- Contains (at pp. 40–42) letter by Bruce-Mitford on weights and scales excavated at Barton-upon-Humber. Part I of the article published at Sheppard, Thomas (October 1939). "Saxon Relics from Barton, Lincs". The Naturalist (993). London: A. Brown & Sons, Ltd.: 257–262.

- "The Sutton Hoo Musical Instrument". Reports of Meetings. The Archaeological News Letter. 1 (1). London: Linden Publicity: 11–13. April 1948. ISSN 0003-8040.

- Summary of lecture given by Bruce-Mitford to the Society of Antiquaries of London on 26 February 1948.

- Bruce-Mitford, Rupert (May 1949). "The Alfred Jewel". Letters to the Editor. The Museums Journal. 49 (2). London: The Museums Association: 47–48. ISSN 0027-416X.
- ——— (1950). "Gold and Silver Work: Early Christian". Chambers's Encyclopædia. Vol. VI. London: George Newnes Limited. pp. 418–419. OCLC 265899.
- ——— (1950). "Jewellery: Dark Ages". Chambers's Encyclopædia. Vol. VIII. London: George Newnes Limited. pp. 87–89.
- ——— (October 1951). "Archaeology in Cornwall". Letters. The Archaeological News Letter. 4 (3). London: Linden Publicity: 43. ISSN 0003-8040.
- ——— (1955). "Sutton Hoo Ship Burial". The Encyclopedia Americana. Vol. 26. New York: Americana Corporation. p. 104. LCCN 55-5910.

- Republished in subsequent editions, such as ——— (1956). "Sutton Hoo Ship Burial". The Encyclopedia Americana. Vol. XXVI. New York: Americana Corporation. pp. 104–104b. LCCN 56-5839, and ——— (1970). "Sutton Hoo Ship Burial". The Encyclopedia Americana. Vol. 26. New York: Americana Corporation. pp. 103–104b. LCCN 72-97500. SBN 7172-0101-5.

- ——— (September 1955). "Points from Correspondence". The South African Archaeological Bulletin. X (39). Claremont, Cape Town: The South African Archaeological Society: 104. doi:10.2307/3887567. JSTOR 3887567.
- ——— (1956). "Preface to Second Edition". In Watson, William (ed.). Flint Implements: An Account of Stone Age Techniques and Cultures. London: The Trustees of the British Museum. p. v. OCLC 4847841.

- ——— (1968). "Preface to Third Edition". In Watson, William (ed.). Flint Implements: An Account of Stone Age Techniques and Cultures. London: The Trustees of the British Museum. p. 6. ISBN 0-7141-1306-9.

- ——— (June 1956). "The Woman in Grey". Under the Dome. 15 (6). London: British Museum: 2–4. OCLC 561848219.

- Short ghost story.

- ——— (1958). "Anglo-Sassoni e Irlandesi Centri e Tradizioni". Enciclopedia Universale dell'Arte (in Italian). Vol. I. Venice: Istituto per la Collaborazione Culturale. col. 408–425, pl. 248–265. OCLC 6109600.

- Translated and republished as ——— (1959). "Anglo-Saxon and Irish Art". Encyclopedia of World Art. Vol. I. New York: McGraw-Hill Book Company, Inc. col. 446–463, pl. 274–291.

- ——— (1961). "Revival of Roman Influences in the 7th and 8th Centuries in Anglo-Saxon Archaeology". In Bersu, Gerhard & Dehn, Wolfgang (eds.). Bericht über den V. Internationalen Kongress für Vor- und Frühgeschichte Hamburg vom 24. bis 30. August, 1958. Berlin: Verlag Gebr. Mann. p. 158. OCLC 1046238019.
- ——— (19 July 1963). "Mr. A. B. Tonnochy". Obituary. The Times. No. 55757. London. p. 14. Archived from the original on 4 April 2023.
- ——— (23 July 1965). "Mr. Herbert Maryon". Obituary. The Times. No. 56381. London. p. 14. Archived from the original on 5 November 2023.
- ——— & Jenkins, Gilbert Kenneth (29 November 1966). "Treasure Trove". Letters to the Editor. The Times. No. 56801. London. p. 11. Archived from the original on 9 May 2023.
- ——— (1967). "Anglo-Saxon Ship-Burials". The Twentieth Aldeburgh Festival of Music and the Arts. p. 33. OCLC 28358875.
- ——— (1967). "Celtic Art". New Catholic Encyclopedia. Vol. III. New York: McGraw-Hill Book Company. pp. 382–383. LCCN 66-22292.

- LCCN incorrectly printed as LCCN 80--84291.

- ——— (1967). "Durrow, Book of". New Catholic Encyclopedia. Vol. IV. New York: McGraw-Hill Book Company. pp. 1123–1124. LCCN 66-22292.

- ——— (2003). "Durrow, Book of". New Catholic Encyclopedia: Com-Dyn. New Catholic Encyclopedia. Vol. 4 (2nd ed.). Detroit: Thomson Gale. pp. 953–954. ISBN 0-7876-4008-5.

- ——— (1967). "Irish Art". New Catholic Encyclopedia. Vol. VII. New York: McGraw-Hill Book Company. pp. 633–666. LCCN 66-22292.
- ——— (1967). "Irish Crosses". New Catholic Encyclopedia. Vol. VII. New York: McGraw-Hill Book Company. pp. 644–645. LCCN 66-22292.

- ——— (2003). "Irish Crosses". New Catholic Encyclopedia: Hol-Jub. New Catholic Encyclopedia. Vol. 7 (2nd ed.). Detroit: Thomson Gale. pp. 583–584. ISBN 0-7876-4011-5.

- ——— (1967). "Kells, Book of". New Catholic Encyclopedia. Vol. VIII. New York: McGraw-Hill Book Company. pp. 145–146. LCCN 66-22292.

- ——— (2003). "Kells, Book of". New Catholic Encyclopedia: Jud-Lyo. New Catholic Encyclopedia. Vol. 8 (2nd ed.). Detroit: Thomson Gale. pp. 138–139. ISBN 0-7876-4012-3.

- ——— (1967). "Lindisfarne Gospels". New Catholic Encyclopedia. Vol. VIII. New York: McGraw-Hill Book Company. p. 771. LCCN 66-22292.

- ——— (2003). "Lindisfarne Gospels". New Catholic Encyclopedia: Jud-Lyo. New Catholic Encyclopedia. Vol. 8 (2nd ed.). Detroit: Thomson Gale. pp. 593–594. ISBN 0-7876-4012-3.

- ——— (1969). "Preface". In Zürn, Hartwig & Schiek, Siegwalt (eds.). Die Sammlung Edelmann im Britischen Museum zu London [The Edelmann Collection in the British Museum in London]. Urkunden zur Vor- und Frühgeschichte aus Südwürttemberg-Hohenzollern (in German). Vol. 3. Stuttgart: Verlag Müller & Gräff. p. 5. OCLC 17063707.
- ——— (2 February 1971). "Sutton Hoo Stag". Letters to the Editor. The Times. No. 58088. London. p. 15. Archived from the original on 9 May 2023.
- ——— (27 July 1971). "Treasure Trove". Letters to the Editor. The Times. No. 58235. London. p. 20. Archived from the original on 27 September 2022.
- ——— (23 March 1977). "Mr Basil Brown: Discovery of Sutton Hoo Ship". Obituary. The Times. No. 59959. London. p. 18. Archived from the original on 9 May 2023.
- ——— (May 1976). "The Paglesham Brooch". Letters. Current Archaeology. Vol. V, no. 56. p. 287. ISSN 0011-3212.

- Letter regarding article in previous issue: Clarke, David Tyrwhitt-Drake (January 1976). "Saved for Britain!". Current Archaeology. Vol. V, no. 54. pp. 214–215. ISSN 0011-3212.

- Bruce-Mitford, Rupert (12 December 1979). "Mr Leslie Dow". Obituary. The Times. No. 60498. London. p. 16. Archived from the original on 4 April 2023.

- Not attributed to Bruce-Mitford in The Times, but listed in Bruce-Mitford 1989b, p. 28 (#55).

- ——— (11 March 1980). "A Long Way Back in Tipperary". Letters to the Editor. The Times. No. 60572. London. p. 13. Archived from the original on 4 April 2023.
- ——— (28 August 1989). "Ship or Tomb at Sutton Hoo?". Letters to the Editor. The Times. No. 63484. London. p. 11. Archived from the original on 30 July 2021.
- Oddy, Andrew & Bruce-Mitford, Rupert (1 May 1992). "Nigel Reuben Rook Williams, 1944–1992: Two Tributes". Unpublished.

== Bibliography ==
- Alexander, John (December 1969). "Review of The Bog People, by P. V. Glob". Antiquity. XLIII (172): 320–321. doi:10.1017/S0003598X00040758. S2CID 163281870.
- Allison, Susan (1976). Ormsby, Margaret (ed.). A Pioneer Gentlewoman in British Columbia: The Recollections of Susan Allison. Vancouver: University of British Columbia Press. ISBN 0-7748-0039-9.
- Arkell, William Joscelyn (1938). "The Geology of the Site of the Bodleian Extension in Broad Street" (PDF). Oxoniensia. III. Oxford: Oxfordshire Architectural and Historical Society: 1–5. ISSN 0308-5562. Archived (PDF) from the original on 19 May 2016.
- Arrhenius, Birgit (1978). "Review of The Sutton Hoo Ship-Burial, volume 1, by Rupert Bruce-Mitford". Medieval Archaeology. 22. Society for Medieval Archaeology: 189–195. doi:10.1080/00766097.1978.11735412.
- Biddle, Martin; Binns, Alan; Cameron, J. M.; Metcalf, David Michael; Page, Raymond Ian; Sparrow, Charles & Warren, F. L. (1977). "Sutton Hoo Published: A Review". Anglo-Saxon England. 6. Cambridge: Cambridge University Press: 249–265. doi:10.1017/s0263675100001058. S2CID 161813648.
- Biddle, Martin (1997–1998). "Dr Rupert Bruce-Mitford F.B.A., F.S.A." (PDF). The Hertford College Magazine (83): 115–121. Archived (PDF) from the original on 15 January 2022.
- Biddle, Martin (3 December 2015). "Rupert Leo Scott Bruce-Mitford: 1914–1994" (PDF). Biographical Memoirs of Fellows of the British Academy. XIV. British Academy: 58–86. Archived (PDF) from the original on 28 September 2020.
- Blair, Peter Hunter (January 1976). "Review of Aspects of Anglo-Saxon Archaeology, by Rupert Bruce-Mitford". The English Historical Review. XCI (358). London: Longman Group Limited: 172–173. JSTOR 565221.
- "Boat Graves in Sweden". The Archaeological News Letter. 1 (5). Linden Publicity: 4, 7. August–September 1948. ISSN 0003-8040.
- Bromley, Eustace Blake (1937). They Were Men Sent From God (PDF). Bangalore: The Scripture Literature Press. Archived (PDF) from the original on 30 July 2021.
- Bruce-Mitford, Charles Eustace (1902). The Territory of Wei-hai-wei: A Descriptive Guide and Handbook with Maps and Illustrations a Historical Note and Appendix. Shanghai: Kelly & Walsh, Limited.
- Bruce-Mitford, Charles Eustace (June 1903a). "Wei-Hai-Wei: Some Physical Characteristics of Our New Dependency in the Far East". The Geographical Teacher. II (2): 66–70. JSTOR 40554245.
- Bruce-Mitford, Charles Eustace (July 1903b). "Mountain and Cliff at Weihaiwei". The East of Asia Magazine. II (2): 169–173.
- Bruce-Mitford, Charles Eustace (1905). A New Geography of Japan for the Upper Forms of Schools and Colleges. Yokohama: Japan Gazette Press.
- Bruce-Mitford, Charles Eustace (February 1908). "Notes on the Physiography of Certain Volcanoes in Northern Japan". The Geographical Journal. XXXI (2). London: The Royal Geographical Society: 187–198. Bibcode:1908GeogJ..31..187M. doi:10.2307/1776879. JSTOR 1776879.
- Bruce-Mitford, Charles Eustace (1909). "The Active Volcanoes of Japan". Transactions of the Asiatic Society of Japan. XXXVII (I). Yokohama: Asiatic Society of Japan: 89–112.
- Bruce-Mitford, Charles Eustace (19 July 1910). "The Volcanoes of Japan". The Times. No. 39, 328. London. p. 70. Archived from the original on 24 December 2025 – via Newspapers.com.
- Bruce-Mitford, Charles Eustace (1914). Japan's Inheritance: The Country, Its People, and Their Destiny. New York: Dodd, Mead & Co.
- The Celebrated Collection of English and Continental Clocks Formed by the Late Courtenay A. Ilbert, Esq., F.B.H.I . London: Christie, Manson & Woods, Inc. 1958. OCLC 4020841.
- Cherry, John (1995). "Rupert Bruce-Mitford 1914–1994" (PDF). Medieval Archaeology. 39. Society for Medieval Archaeology: 178–179. doi:10.5284/1000320. Archived (PDF) from the original on 2 September 2017.
- Clark, Mary Kitson (1941). "Roman Yorkshire, 1940". The Yorkshire Archæological Journal. XXXV (138). Yorkshire Archæological Society: 222–227.
- Cramp, Rosemary (1978). "Review of The Sutton Hoo Ship-Burial, volume 1, by Rupert Bruce-Mitford". The Antiquaries Journal. LVIII (2). London: The Oxford University Press: 426–428. doi:10.1017/S0003581500056158.
- Cramp, Rosemary (23 March 1994). "Rupert Bruce-Mitford". Obituaries. The Independent. No. 2, 314. London. p. 14. Archived from the original on 24 October 2023 – via Newspapers.com.

- Also published online

- Cunliffe, B. W. (26 July 1969). "Bog Burials". Nature. 223 (5204). Macmillan (Journals) Ltd.: 423–424. Bibcode:1969Natur.223..423C. doi:10.1038/223423b0.
- Dann, Robert Bernard (2004). Father of Faith Missions: The Life and Times of Anthony Norris Groves. Waynesboro, Georgia: Authentic Media. OCLC 58027950.
- Dickinson, Tania M. (September 1975). "Review of Aspects of Anglo-Saxon Archaeology, by Rupert Bruce-Mitford". Antiquity. XLIX (195): 227–228. doi:10.1017/S0003598X00070101. S2CID 163138211.
- Evison, Vera (1980). "Review of The Sutton Hoo Ship-Burial, volume 2, by Rupert Bruce-Mitford". The Antiquaries Journal. LX (1). London: The Oxford University Press: 124–127. doi:10.1017/S0003581500036179.
- Farrell, Robert T. (October 1977). "Review of The Sutton Hoo Ship-Burial, volume 1, by Rupert Bruce-Mitford". Speculum. LII (4). Cambridge, Massachusetts: The Mediaeval Academy of America: 932–935. doi:10.2307/2855397. JSTOR 2855397.
- Farrell, Robert T. (July 1981). "Review of The Sutton Hoo Ship-Burial, volume 2, by Rupert Bruce-Mitford, and of The Sutton Hoo Ship-Burial: Reflections after Thirty Years, by Rupert Bruce-Mitford". Speculum. 56 (3). Cambridge, Massachusetts: The Mediaeval Academy of America: 590–593. doi:10.2307/2847749. JSTOR 2847749.
- Farrell, Robert T. (January 1985). "Review of The Sutton Hoo Ship-Burial, volume 3, by Rupert Bruce-Mitford". Speculum. 60 (1). Cambridge, Massachusetts: The Mediaeval Academy of America: 126–130. doi:10.2307/2852142. JSTOR 2852142.
- Gardner, Samuel (1927). English Gothic Foliage Sculpture. Cambridge: Cambridge University Press.
- Graham-Campbell, James (March 1977). "Review of The Sutton Hoo Ship-Burial, volume 1, by Rupert Bruce-Mitford". Antiquity. LI (201): 79–80. doi:10.1017/S0003598X00100754. S2CID 163133488.
- Graham-Campbell, James (July 1979). "Review of The Sutton Hoo Ship-Burial, volume 2, by Rupert Bruce-Mitford". Antiquity. LIII (208): 159–160. doi:10.1017/S0003598X00042435. S2CID 163087755.
- Hawkes, Christopher (December 1964). "Sutton Hoo: Twenty-Five Years After". Antiquity. XXXVIII (152): 252–257. doi:10.1017/S0003598X00031136. S2CID 164039505.
- Hawkes, Christopher (1976). "Review of Aspects of Anglo-Saxon Archaeology, by Rupert Bruce-Mitford". The Antiquaries Journal. LVI (1). London: The Oxford University Press: 104–105. doi:10.1017/S0003581500019892. S2CID 163031781.
- Henry, Françoise (June 1963). "The Lindisfarne Gospels". Antiquity. XXXVII (146): 100–110. doi:10.1017/S0003598X00037200. S2CID 163055695.
- Hills, C. M. (March 1985). "Review of The Sutton Hoo Ship-Burial, volume 3, by Rupert Bruce-Mitford". Antiquity. LIX (225): 60–61. doi:10.1017/S0003598X00056611. S2CID 163185472.
- Hinton, David A. (1977). ""Rudely Made Earthen Vessels" of the Twelfth to Fifteenth Centuries A.D.". In Peacock, David Philip Spencer (ed.). Pottery and Early Commerce: Characterization and Trade Roman and Later Ceramics. London: Academic Press. pp. 221–238. ISBN 0-12-547850-X. LCCN 77-77360.
- Hoving, Thomas (1981). King of the Confessors. New York: Simon & Schuster. ISBN 0-671-43388-1. LCCN 81-9050.
- Jope, E. M. (1989). "Preface". In Henderson, Julian (ed.). Scientific Analysis in Archaeology and Its Interpretation. Monograph (Oxford University Committee for Archaeology). Vol. 19. Oxford: Oxford University Committee for Archaeology Institute of Archaeology. pp. xi–xv. ISBN 0-947816-19-4. LCCN 89-26932.
- Kirby, David Peter (January 1971). "Review of The Sutton Hoo Ship-Burial: A Handbook, by Rupert Bruce-Mitford". The English Historical Review. LXXXVI (338). London: Longman Group Limited: 153–154. doi:10.1093/ehr/LXXXVI.CCCXXXVIII.153.
- Lomax, Eric (1995). The Railway Man. London: Jonathan Cape. ISBN 0-224-04187-8.
- Magoun, Francis P. Jr. (January 1954). "The Sutton Hoo Ship-Burial: A Chronological Bibliography". Speculum. XXIX (1). Cambridge, Massachusetts: The Mediaeval Academy of America: 116–124. doi:10.2307/2853871. JSTOR 2853871. S2CID 162599371.
- Mann, James (July–October 1954). "Anniversary Address". The Antiquaries Journal. XXXIV (3–4). London: Society of Antiquaries of London: 149–154. doi:10.1017/S0003581500059825. S2CID 246042776.
- Martin-Clarke, D. Elizabeth (1947). Culture in Early Anglo-Saxon England (PDF). Baltimore: Johns Hopkins Press. Archived (PDF) from the original on 3 January 2019.
- Mellor, Maureen (1997). Pots and People that Have Shaped the Heritage of Medieval and Later England. Oxford: Ashmolean Museum. ISBN 1-85444-080-2.
- Myres, J. N. L. (1974). "Anniversary Address". The Antiquaries Journal. LIV (1). London: Society of Antiquaries of London: 1–7. doi:10.1017/S0003581500030055. S2CID 246045948.
- Myres, J. N. L. (October 1977). "Review of The Sutton Hoo Ship-Burial, volume 1, by Rupert Bruce-Mitford". The English Historical Review. XCII (365). Longman Group Limited: 847–851. doi:10.1093/ehr/XCII.CCCLXV.847. JSTOR 567658.
- Myres, J. N. L. (July 1980). "Review of The Sutton Hoo Ship-Burial, volume 2, by Rupert Bruce-Mitford". The English Historical Review. XCV (376). Longman Group Limited: 607–611. doi:10.1093/ehr/XCV.CCCLXXVI.607. JSTOR 568060.
- Myres, J. N. L. (January 1985). "Review of The Sutton Hoo Ship-Burial, volume 3, by Rupert Bruce-Mitford". The English Historical Review. C (394). Longman Group Limited: 120–121. doi:10.1093/ehr/C.CCCXCIV.120. JSTOR 569930.
- Nield, Robert (2015). China's Foreign Places: The Foreign Presence in China in the Treaty Port Era, 1840–1943. Hong Kong: Hong Kong University Press. ISBN 978-988-8139-28-6.
- Pantin, William Abel (1937). "The Recently Demolished Houses in Broad Street, Oxford" (PDF). Oxoniensia. II. Oxford: Oxfordshire Architectural and Historical Society: 171–200. ISSN 0308-5562. Archived (PDF) from the original on 13 June 2012.
- "Proceedings of the Society of Antiquaries". The Antiquaries Journal. XXX (3–4). London: Society of Antiquaries of London: 233–240. July–October 1950. doi:10.1017/S0003581500088077. S2CID 246042921.
- "Proceedings". The Antiquaries Journal. LII (2). London: Society of Antiquaries of London: 438–460. 1972. doi:10.1017/S000358150002148X.
- "Roman Britain in 1940". The Journal of Roman Studies. XXXVI. London: The Society for the Promotion of Roman Studies: 128–148. 1941. JSTOR 297109.
- Ross, Edward Hunter (October 1975). "Review of Aspects of Anglo-Saxon Archaeology, by Rupert Bruce-Mitford". Archaeology. 28 (4). New York: Archaeological Institute of America: 279–280. JSTOR 41710181.
- Rowlett, Ralph M. (December 1970). "Review of The Bog People, by P. V. Glob". American Anthropologist. 72 (6). Washington, D.C.: American Anthropological Association: 1568–1569. doi:10.1525/aa.1970.72.6.02a01080. JSTOR 672952.
- Ryan, Michael (June 2006). "Review of A Corpus of Late Celtic Hanging Bowls, by Rupert Bruce-Mitford & Sheila Raven". Antiquity. 80 (308): 487–488. doi:10.1017/S0003598X00093923. S2CID 163688085.
- Stunt, William Thornburgh; Pulleng, Alexander; Pickering, Arnold; Simmons, George Philip; Boak, Donald Kenneth & Warren, Stanley Francis (1972). Turning the World Upside Down: A Century of Missionary Endeavour (2nd ed.). Bath: Echoes of Service.
- Tatford, Frederick Albert (1983). "The Godavari Delta". The Challenge of India. That the World May Know. Vol. 3. Bath: Echoes of Service. pp. 91–128. ISBN 0-946-214-02-6.
- Tatford, Frederick Albert (1986). The Islands of the Sea. That the World May Know. Vol. 10. Bath: Echoes of Service. ISBN 0-946214-11-5.
- Taylor, A. J. (1976). "Anniversary Address". The Antiquaries Journal. LVI (I). London: The Oxford University Press: 1–10. doi:10.1017/S0003581500019582. S2CID 246044560.
- Werner, Joachim (1982). "Das Schiffsgrab von Sutton Hoo: Forschungsgeschichte und Informationsstand zwischen 1939 und 1980" [The Sutton Hoo Ship-Burial: Research and Publication Between 1939 and 1980]. Germania (in German). 60 (1): 193–209. doi:10.11588/ger.1982.94642.

- Translated as Werner, Joachim (1985). The Sutton Hoo Ship-Burial: Research and Publication Between 1939 and 1980. Translated by Hawkes, Christopher & Hawkes, Sonia. Oxford: Privately printed. OCLC 848873715.

- Williams, Harold S. (1958). Tales of the Foreign Settlements in Japan. Tokyo: Charles E. Tuttle Company. LCCN 58-11101.
- Williams, Nigel (1992). "The Sutton Hoo Helmet". In Oddy, William Andrew (ed.). The Art of the Conservator. London: British Museum Press. pp. 73–88. ISBN 0-7141-2056-1.
- Wilson, David M. (1992). "Sutton Hoo – Pros and Cons". In Farrell, Robert & Neuman de Vegvar, Carol (eds.). Sutton Hoo: Fifty Years After. American Early Medieval Studies. Vol. 2. Oxford, Ohio: Miami University. pp. 5–12. ISBN 1-879836-01-7.
  - ISBN incorrectly printed as ISBN 1-879836-02-7
- Wilson, David M. (2002). The British Museum: A History. London: British Museum Press. ISBN 0-7141-2764-7.
