= Internationales Sachsensymposion =

Research network studying Germanic Saxons

Internationales Sachsensymposion. Arbeitsgemeinschaft zur Archäologie der Sachsen und ihrer Nachbarvölker in Nordwesteuropa ("International Saxons Symposium. Research network for the archaeological study of the Saxons and their neighbouring peoples in northwestern Europe"), is an international society for "the continuous, joint – international – study of the history and ethnic origins of the Germanic Saxons". A secondary stated goal "is to discuss the relevant relationships that existed between all these populations and that can be detected in the countries bordering the North and Baltic Seas." The organisation has been credited with stimulating the publication of material from both the collections of museums, and contemporary excavations, and is considered the authoritative forum for the discussion of the archaeology of northwestern Europe in the first millennium AD. Membership is by election; today the organisation comprises approximately 180 members, from Belgium, Denmark, Germany, Finland, France, Great Britain, the Netherlands, Norway, Poland, Sweden, and the United States.

== History ==
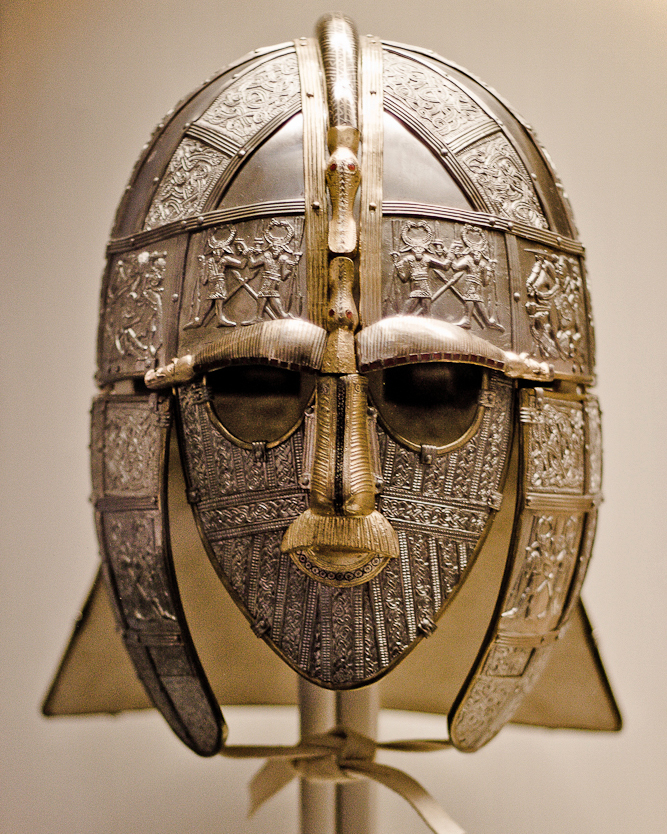
The Royal Armouries replica of the Sutton Hoo helmet was unveiled at the 1973 symposium.

The Internationales Sachsensymposion was founded in Cuxhaven, Germany, in 1949, although it is currently organised under Belgian law. It was initially known as the Arbeitsgemeinschaft für Sachsenforschung (Study Group for Saxon Research), and was formed at the instigation of Karl Waller, then the head of the office for the protection of prehistoric monuments in urban Cuxhaven, as a way to facilitate the study of ancient Saxons. The organisation was also intended to help reestablish post-War relations with the North Sea countries by focusing on shared archaeological problems. Fourteen scholars were invited to the first symposium, held from 21 to 23 November 1949 in Cuxhaven. Following the death of Waller in 1963, meetings continued under the leadership of Albert Genrich (de), who had been a co-founder and active participant. Later, from 1996 to 2002, Hans-Jürgen Häßler served as chairman.

With few interruptions the Sachsensymposion has met annually since 1949, most recently holding its 68th symposium over five days in September 2017, in Canterbury. It was the first time the conference was held in that city, as was co-hosted by Canterbury Christ Church University, Canterbury Archaeological Trust and the University of Kent. The symposia have broadened over time, and now function as a forum to discuss the archaeology of early northwestern Europe; though generally held in Germany, other hosts have included the Netherlands, Belgium, the Scandinavian countries, and, multiple times, England.

The 24th rendition, held in London in September 1973, was the occasion for the "theatrical" unveiling of the Royal Armouries replica of the Anglo-Saxon Sutton Hoo helmet. Preceding an evening address, the lights were dimmed; down the aisle came Nigel Williams holding a replica of the Sutton Hoo whetstone; and behind him followed Rupert Bruce-Mitford, wearing a carriage rug and with hands hieratically crossed, wearing the Royal Armouries helmet and reciting the opening lines of Beowulf.

Members of the Sachsensymposion hail from eleven countries, and include Martin Carver, Helena Hamerow, Barbara Yorke, and Alex Woolf. Nancy Wicker of the University of Mississippi, as of 2017, is the only American ever elected a member. Early participants in the Sachsensymposion included Fritz Tischler (de) and Joachim Werner.

== Bibliography ==
- Biddle, Martin (3 December 2015). "Rupert Leo Scott Bruce-Mitford: 1914–1994" (PDF). Biographical Memoirs of Fellows of the British Academy. XIV. British Academy: 58–86.
- "General Information". Internationales Sachsensymposion.
- "History". Internationales Sachsensymposion.
- "Members". Internationales Sachsensymposion.
- Myres, John Nowell Linton (1969). Anglo-Saxon Pottery and the Settlement of England. Oxford: Clarendon Press.
- Myres, J. N. L. (1974). "Anniversary Address". The Antiquaries Journal. LIV (1). London: Society of Antiquaries of London: 1–7. doi:10.1017/S0003581500030055. S2CID 246045948.
- Myres, John Nowell Linton (1986). The English Settlements. Oxford: Oxford University Press. ISBN 0-19-282235-7.
- Ludowici, Babette (2012). "Hans-Jürgen Häßler (1939–2011)". Archäologisches Nachrichtenblatt (in German). 17 (1). Akademie Verlag: 90–92. ISSN 0948-8359.
- Sweetinburgh, Sheila (29 March 2016). "Canterbury Manuscript and Plantagenet Princesses". Centre for Kent History and Heritage. Canterbury Christ Church University.
- "Symposia since 1949". Internationales Sachsensymposion.
- Wicker, Nancy (2017). "Dr. Nancy Wicker". Department of Art and Art History. University of Mississippi.
