= Lectionary 238 =

Lectionary ℓ 238
- New Testament manuscript
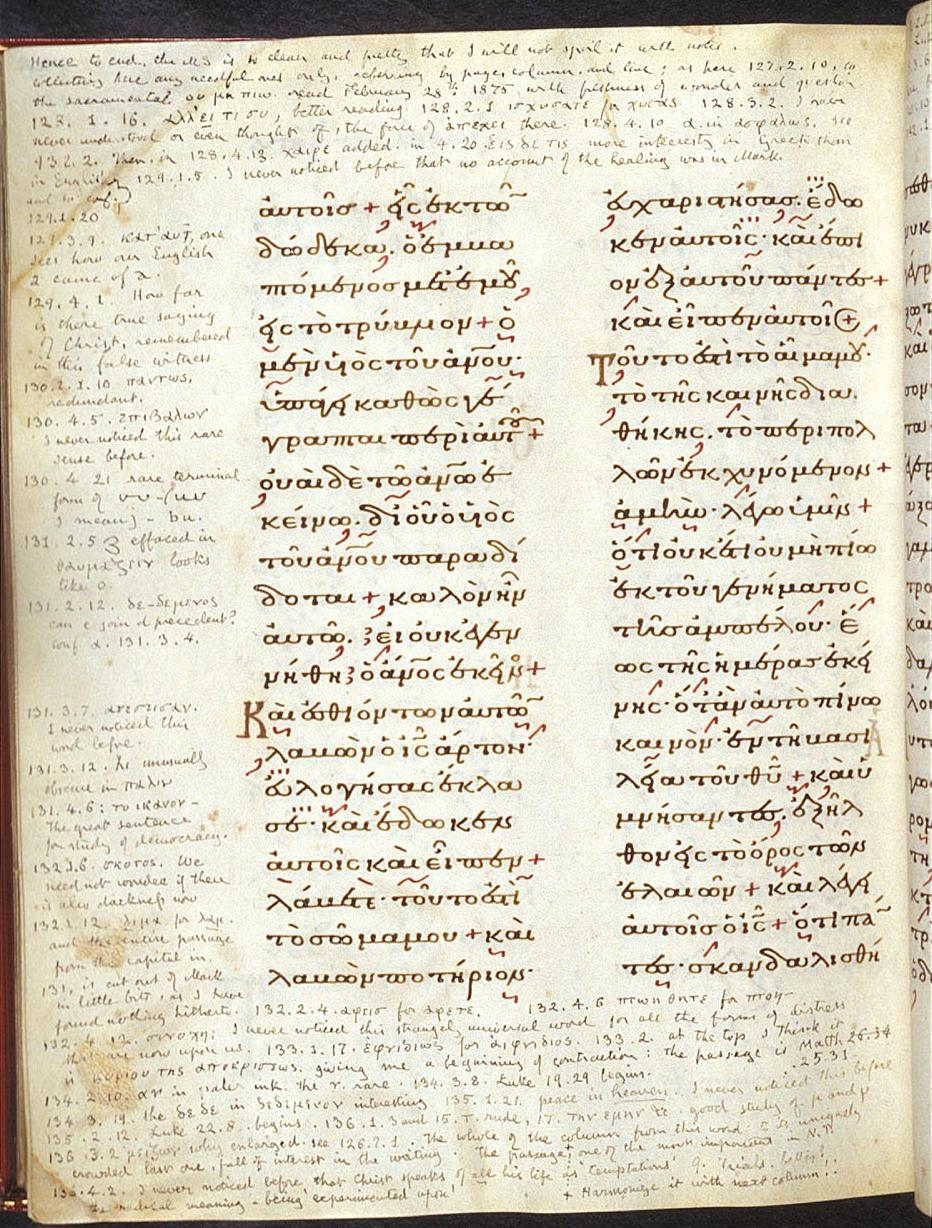
- Folio 136 verso
- Text: Evangelistarium †
- Date: 11th century
- Script: Greek
- Now at: British Library
- Size: 31.7 cm by 26 cm

Lectionary 238, designated by the siglum ℓ 238 (in the Gregory-Aland numbering) is a Greek manuscript of the New Testament, on parchment. Palaeographically it has been assigned to the 11th century. Scrivener labelled it by 254^{evl}. The manuscript contents are not complex, as it was supplied from several manuscripts.

== Description ==
The codex contains lessons from the Gospels of John, Matthew, Luke lectionary (Evangelistarium), with some lacunae at the end. Some leaves were supplied by a later hand. According to Scrivener it is mutilated but well repaired.

Small headpieces in gold, the initial letters in red, accents in red, the writing in gold. It contains musical notes. Itacistic errors are frequent.

The text is written in Greek minuscule letters, on 144 parchment leaves (31.7 cm by 26 cm), in two columns per page, 21 lines per page.

There are daily lessons from Easter to Pentecost.

== History ==
Scrivener dated the manuscript to the 13th or 14th century, Gregory to the 11th or 12th century. It is presently assigned by the INTF to the 11th century. According to the description given by the British Library in "Catalogue of Illuminated Manuscripts" it was written in "last quarter of the 11th century or 1st quarter of the 12th century" in "Eastern Mediterranean".

The manuscript was bought by John Ruskin from Bernard Quaritch (1819–1899), bookseller and publisher, in 1871. Then it was purchased for Sotheby's, 24 July 1930, bought by the British Museum, using the Farnborough Fund, £3,000 bequeathed in 1838 by Charles Long.

It was examined by Scrivener and Bell.

The manuscript was added to the list of New Testament manuscripts by Scrivener (number 254) and Gregory (number 238). Gregory saw it in 1883.

The manuscript is not cited in the critical editions of the Greek New Testament (UBS3).

Currently the codex is housed at the British Library (Egerton 3046) in London.

== See also ==
- List of New Testament lectionaries
- Biblical manuscript
- Textual criticism

== Bibliography ==
- Frederick Henry Scrivener, A Full and Exact Collation of about Twenty Greek Manuscripts of the Holy Gospels (Cambridge, Cambridge University Press, 1853), evst. 254.
- H. I. Bell, A Greek Evangelistarium from the Library of John Ruskin, British Museum Quarterly, 5 (1930-31), pp. 87-88.
