= Mawgan Porth Dark Age Village =

Small ancient settlement on the North coast of Cornwall, England

- Porthglyvyan
- Location within Cornwall
- 50°26′05″N 005°00′47″W
- Type: Ancient village
- Periods: Early Middle Ages (Dark Ages)
- Cultures: Dumnonia
- Location: Mawgan Porth grid reference (SW851672
- Region: Cornwall

History
- Built: c. 850 AD
- Abandoned: c. 1050 AD

Site notes
- Excavation dates: 1949-52, 1954 and 1974
- Archaeologists: Rupert Bruce-Mitford, Paul Ashbee, Ernest Greenfield
- Condition: Ruins
- Public access: Yes

Mawgan Porth Dark Age Village is a small ancient settlement consisting of 3 courtyard house complexes and a cemetery on the North coast of Cornwall dating from the 10th century. It was excavated in 1950-54 by Rupert Bruce-Mitford. The site was first discovered after a skeleton was unearthed in 1934. The landowner. Mr P A Wailes, had wanted to build on the land and soundings to test the subsoil revealed the skeleton, stone walls, pottery and bone fragments.

== Excavations ==
A trial excavation was carried out in 1948, and this led to larger scale investigation between 1950 and 1954

== Cemetery ==
The cemetery contained several adult and child burials enclosed in slab graves. Pottery finds from the excavations form were distinctive forms, partly inspired by the bar-lug tradition of Scilly and Cornwall

== Finds ==
Finds from the site are archived at the British Museum and negatives of Charles Woolf's photographs are held by the Photographic Library of English Heritage

== Dark Age Cornwall ==
At one time, very little was known of the period known as the 'Dark Ages' in Cornwall. The Cornwall edition of Victoria County History, only lists stones crosses and the silver hoard that was found at Trewhiddle in 1974. However, the Trewhiddle hoard is one of the finest collections of Early Medieval silverwork found in Britain.

More recent excavations at Tintagel as well as previous digs at Duckpool, St Pirans Oratory near Perranporth and a Settlement excavated at Gunwalloe paint the picture of a vibrant country with a rich and literate elite.
