= Elijah Howarth =

English museum curator and astronomer

Elijah Howarth FRAS (25 June 1853, Liverpool – 1 April 1938, Dronfield) was an English museum curator and astronomer.

Howarth was the son of a labourer. In 1871 he started work at the Liverpool Museum. His early exhibition work helped establish the Walker Art Gallery and allowed him to develop his skills as an art conservator.

== Curatorial and museological career ==
In 1876 he was appointed curator at newly opened Sheffield City Museum in Weston Park. He went on to set up the Weston Park Observatory in 1880 and two years later developed the Weston Park Weather Station. He also founded the Mappin Art Gallery and High Hazels Museum.

He was the founding member of the Museums Association, and served as their secretary from 1891-1909. He was also editor of their journal, Museums Journal, which he edited from 1901 to 1909.

== Astronomical activity ==
He was trained in astronomy by John Couch Adams who also sponsored his election as a Fellow of the Royal Astronomical Society in 1881.

== Other activities ==
He was also an active freemason.

== Family life ==
Howarth married Ann Jane Fairclough (1854-1915) on 9 December 1875. Together they had six children:

- William Fairclough (1876-1953)
- Edith Nightingale (1879–1944)
- Thomas Herbert (1880-1954)
- Ellen Mabel (1882-1950)
- Annie Winifred (1884-1945)
- Millicent Mary (1893-1962)

After becoming a widower he married Maud Elizabeth Fresson (1875-1949) in 1915.
