= Donald Harden =

Donald Benjamin Harden
- Born: 8 July 1901
- Died: 13 April 1994 (aged 92)
- Known for: Specialist in ancient glass Director of the London Museum (1956–1970) Acting Director of the Museum of London (1965–1970)
- Office: President, Council for British Archaeology (1950–1954); Vice-President, Society of Antiquaries of London (1949–1953; 1964–1967)
- Awards: Commander of the Order of the British Empire (CBE); Fellow of the British Academy (FBA); Fellow of the Society of Antiquaries (FSA)

Donald Benjamin Harden, CBE, FBA, FSA (8 July 1901 – 13 April 1994) was an Anglo-Irish archaeologist and museum curator, who specialised in ancient glass. He was educated at Trinity College Cambridge and taught at the University of Aberdeen and studied at the University of Michigan where he held a prestigious Commonwealth Fund Fellowship (1926-28). He was assistant keeper (1929–1945) and then keeper (1945–1956) of the Department of Antiquities, Ashmolean Museum. He spent the Second World War as a temporary civil servant in the Ministry of Supply and the Ministry of Production. He was Director of the London Museum from 1956 to 1970, and then, following its merger with the Guildhall Museum, served as Acting Director of the Museum of London from 1965 to 1970.

Harden was President of the Council for British Archaeology from 1950 to 1954; and twice Vice-President of the Society of Antiquaries of London, from 1949 to 1953 and from 1964 to 1967. He had been elected a Fellow of the Society of Antiquaries of London (FSA) in March 1944, and was elected an Honorary Fellow of the British Academy (FBA) in July 1987.
