= Julian Brown (palaeographer) =

English palaeographer (1923–1987)

Thomas Julian Brown, FBA, FSA, FKC (1923–1987), commonly called Julian Brown, was an English palaeographer. He was the Professor of Palaeography at King's College London from 1961 to 1984.

== Early life and education ==
Born on 24 February 1923, Brown was the son of a land agent father and a mother (Helen) who received the MBE for services in the WRVS in the Second World War. His half-sister (by his father Thomas's first wife) was Mabel Raven Brown, known as Betty (married name Gilson; 1909–1965), who became a botanist and fellow of Newnham College, Cambridge. After attending Westminster School, Julian Brown attended Christ Church, Oxford, before serving in the Army during Second World War. He returned to Christ Church after demobilisation and graduated with a classics degree in 1948.

== Career ==
In 1950, Brown was appointed an assistant keeper of the Department of Manuscripts at the British Museum. In 1953, the museum initiated a project to publish a facsimile of the Lindisfarne Gospels with a volume of commentary; the other staff in the department were too busy to complete the palaeographical commentary, so the responsibility passed to Brown, who had no formal instruction in the subject and had only been at the museum for three years. The commentary appeared in 1960 as part of the second volume of Evangeliorum Quattuor Codex Lindisfarnensis and it established his reputation. That year, he succeeded Francis Wormald as Professor of Palaeography at King's College London. He published The Stonyhurst Gospel of St John (1969), The Durham Ritual (1969) and, with C. D. Verey and E. Coatsworth, Durham Gospels (1980). He retired from his chair at King's in 1984, having served as dean of the Faculty of Arts from 1968 to 1970. He published Codex Vaticanus Palatinus Latinus 235 in 1989 (edited with T. Mackay).

Brown was elected a fellow of the Society of Antiquaries of London in 1956. He gave the Jarrow Lecture in 1971; he was the E. A. Lowe Memorial Lecturer at Corpus Christi College, Oxford, in 1973 and the Lyell Reader in Bibliography at the University of Oxford for 1976–77. In 1978, he gave the R. W. Chambers Memorial Lecture at University College London. Elected a fellow of King's College London in 1975, he was awarded an honorary doctorate by Durham University in 1986. He was elected a fellow of the British Academy in 1982. He died, aged 63, on 19 January 1987; he was survived by his second wife and the two children from his first marriage which ended in divorce.
