= James Graham-Campbell =

British archaeologist, professor, and writer

James Graham-Campbell FBA FSA
- Born: 7 February 1947 (age 79)

Academic background
- Education: Eton College
- Alma mater: Trinity College, Cambridge

Academic work
- Discipline: Archaeology
- Sub-discipline: Medieval archaeology; Medieval Europe; Vikings
- Institutions: University College, Dublin; University College London; University of Nottingham

James Graham-Campbell, FBA, FSA (born 7 February 1947) is a British archaeologist, medievalist, and academic, specialising in the Viking Age. He lectured at University College Dublin and University College London (UCL), rising to be Professor of Medieval Archaeology at UCL from 1991 to 2002: he is now professor emeritus.

== Biography ==
Graham-Campbell was born on 7 February 1947. He was educated at Eton College, an all-boys independent boarding school in Berkshire. He studied at Trinity College, Cambridge, graduating with Bachelor of Arts (BA) and Doctor of Philosophy (PhD) degrees: as per tradition, his BA was promoted to a Master of Arts (MA Cantab) degree.

From 1971 to 1973, Graham-Campbell was an assistant lecturer in archaeology at University College, Dublin. In 1973, he joined University College London, where he would spend the rest of his career, as a lecturer. He was promoted to Reader in Medieval Archaeology in 1982, and made Professor of Medieval Archaeology in 1991. In addition to his academic work, he was a member of the Ancient Monuments Advisory Committee, English Heritage from 1992 to 1997. He retired from full-time academia in 2002, and was made an emeritus professor. From 2003 to 2012, he was Special Professor of Viking Studies at the University of Nottingham.

On 3 March 1977, Graham-Campbell was elected a Fellow of the Society of Antiquaries of London (FSA). In 2001, he was elected a Fellow of the British Academy (FBA), United Kingdom's national academy for the humanities and the social sciences.

== Principal publications ==
- Viking artefacts: a select catalogue 1980
- The Viking-Age gold and silver of Scotland (AD 850-1100) 1995
- Vikings in Scotland: an archaeological survey 1998
- The Archaeology of Medieval Europe, Volume 1 :Eighth to Twelfth Centuries AD 2007
- Viking Art 2013
