= Museums Journal =

- Categories: Trade journal, museums
- Publisher: Museums Association
- Founded: 1901
- Website: http://www.museumsassociation.org/museums-journal
- ISSN: 0027-416X

Museums Journal is an online resource and monthly print magazine published by the Museums Association. Museums Journal is a leading source of news and information for museums, galleries, heritage sites and historic houses. Simon Stephens is the current editor, with Eleanor Mills the deputy editor.

Museums Journal is free for all individual members of the Museums Association. Non-members can subscribe.

Museums Journal publishes news stories daily, Q&As with museum sector leaders, alongside monthly features, comment, news analysis, reviews, and a section dedicated to museum people.

New museums and exhibitions are peer-reviewed in Museums Journal, and website users can log in to add their own comments. Both UK and international openings are covered by the magazine. A weekly blog is written by the editorial staff.

Practical work and case studies are covered in Museums Journal's sister publication, Museum Practice.

Museums Journal is editorially independent of the Museums Association. It represents the Museums Association's policy priorities and work programmes as well as other views. The editor has final say about what is published.

== History ==
It was first published in 1901. Elijah Howarth was the first editor, and remained editor until 1909, when he resigned.

Peter van Mensch described the publication as "the first national journal for the museum field as a whole".

Joseph Bailey (1860-1950) was the Editor of the Museums Journal from 1921-26, and the President of the Museums Association from 1924-26. He was the former Secretary and Keeper of the Circulation Department of the Victoria and Albert Museum, and a semi-professional artist who had trained at the Royal College of Art.
