= Swedish Chamber of Commerce for the United Kingdom =

Independent nonprofit Swedish-British business organization

- Type: Non-profit organization
- Founded: 1906
- Headquarters: London, United Kingdom Sweden House, 5 Upper Montagu Street London W1H 2AG
- Key people: Mats Torstendahl; Chairman; Fredrik Warneryd; CEO
- Subsidiaries: Young Professionals of the Swedish Chamber
- Website: http://www.scc.org.uk/

The Swedish Chamber of Commerce (SCC UK), founded in 1906, is an independent, nonprofit Swedish-British business organisation. The Chamber has around 480 member businesses, representing not only Swedish companies but also British and European companies interested in strengthening their existing ties with Sweden and the UK or expanding to new markets. The Swedish Chamber of Commerce for the UK is the oldest and largest foreign Swedish Chamber in the world, and also one of the largest foreign Chambers in the UK.

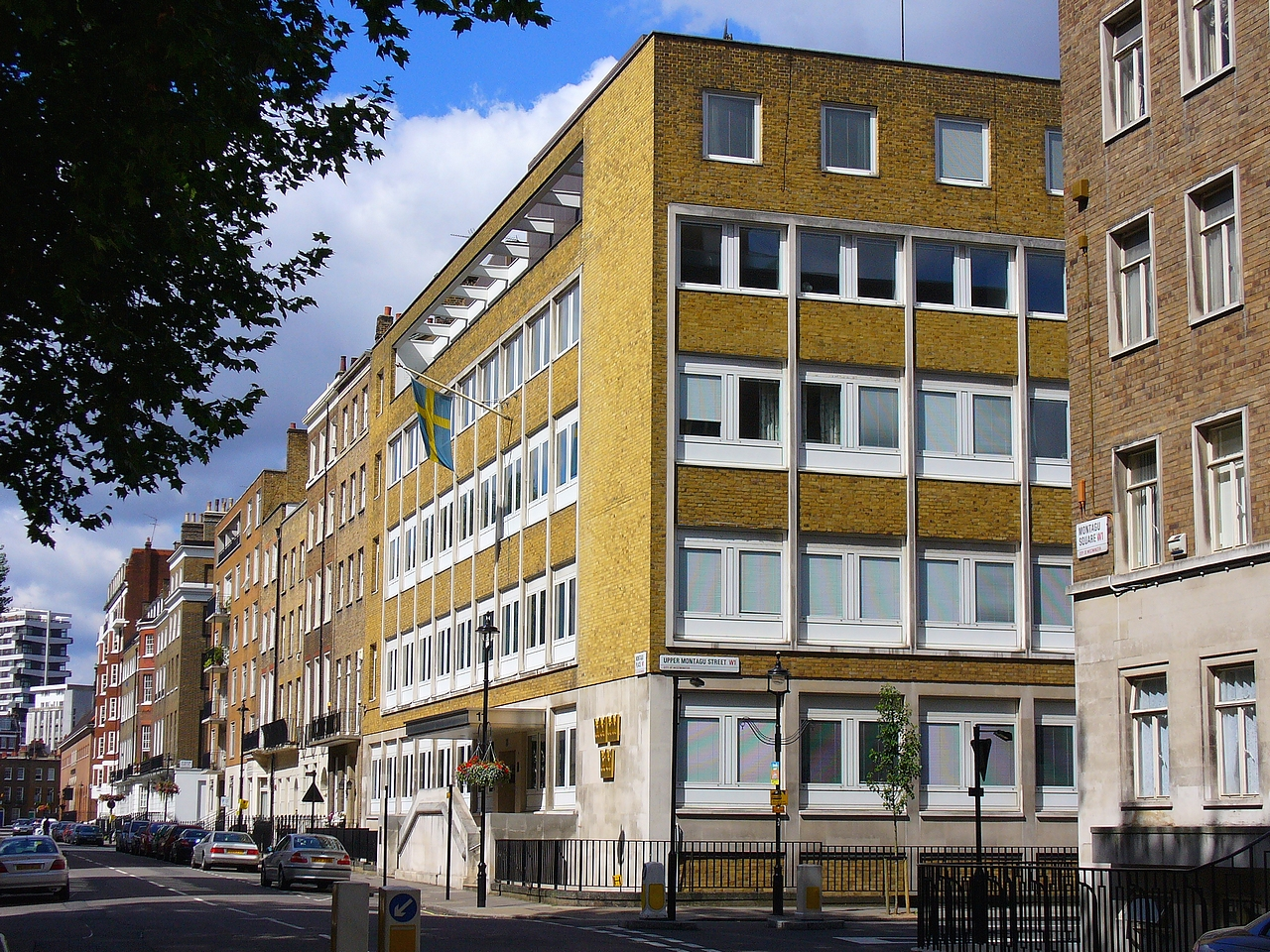
Sweden House

== Young Professionals of the Swedish Chamber ==
In addition, a sub-organisation, the Young Professionals (YP), has approximately 100 individual Members, aged 25–35 with an interest in the Swedish-British business community.

== History ==
The subject of a London Chamber was first discussed in early 1906, when a number of meetings regarding the arrangement of a Swedish exhibition, led to the establishment of the Swedish Chamber of Commerce in London. The Board of Trade granted the Certificate of Incorporation and offices were hired at 136 Fenchurch Street. At the end of 1907 at least 189 members had been elected.

== Former Chairmen ==
- 1906–1915 Fred Löwenadler
- 1915–1924 Harald Benedixson
- 1924–1932 Axel Welin
- 1932–1933 F Ljungberg
- 1933–1941 B De Maré
- 1941–1944 O Thott
- 1944–1946 T Landby
- 1946–1950 N H Leander
- 1950–1959 S Frisell
- 1959–1963 Torolf Lyth
- 1963–1967 Torsten J Mosesson
- 1967–1970 A A Flygt
- 1970–1971 Hans L. Zetterberg
- 1971–1974 Gunnar Englund
- 1974–1977 Kurt Domellöf
- 1977–1981 Keith Lomas
- 1981–1984 Jan Ancarcrona
- 1984–1986 Sir Jeffrey Petersen
- 1986–1989 Bertil Norinder
- 1989–1994 Duncan MacDougall
- 1994–1996 Staffan Gadd
- 1996–1999 Alan Toulson
- 1999–2002 Anders Grundberg
- 2003–2004 Claes Oscarson
- 2004–2007 Roger Gifford
- 2007–2010 Bo Lerenius, CBE
- 2010–2013 Paul von der Heyde
- 2013–2017 Beatrice Engström Bondy
- 2017–2023 Jan Olsson
- 2023-2026 Peter Jelkeby
- 2023-present Mats Torstendahl

== Former Managing Directors ==
- 1906-1917 Louis Zettersten
- 1917-1919 C W Cederwall
- 1919-1943 Dr E Classen
- 1943-1945 E Steffenburg
- 1945-1963 Einar Kihlstedt
- 1963-1967 Curt Björnemark
- 1967-1972 Staffan Widenfelt
- 1972-1977 Vacant
- 1978-1983 Leif Forsberg
- 1983-1994 Gunnar Fineman
- 1994-1999 Pia Helena Ormerod
- 1999-2004 Ulla O'Barius
- 2004-2009 Christina Liljeström
- 2009-2012 Annika Wahlberg
- 2012-2018 Ulla Nilsson
- 2018-2022 Peter Sandberg
- 2022-present Fredrik Warneryd
