= Nowell Myres =

British archaeologist and librarian (1902–1989)

John Nowell Linton Myres FBA FSA CBE (27 December 1902 – 25 September 1989) was a British archaeologist and Bodley's Librarian at the Bodleian Library in Oxford from 1948 until his resignation in 1965; and librarian of Christ Church before his Bodleian appointment.

== Life ==
His father, John, had been Wykeham Professor of Ancient History at Oxford. Nowell Myres was educated at Winchester College and then New College, Oxford and was president of the Oxford University Archaeological Society in 1923. He became a tutor at Christ Church from 1928. He was elected a Fellow of the British Academy in 1966. He gave the 1970 Raleigh Lecture on History.

== Works ==
He was recognised as a leading authority on British history in the time of the Anglo-Saxons and earlier. He and R. G. Collingwood wrote the first volume of the Oxford History of England which was widely recognised as a classic. When the series was re-released in the 1980s this volume was split in two, Peter Salway writing what had been Collingwood's part and Myres rewriting his own part.

== Selected publications ==
- 1936: "The English Settlements", in: Collingwood, R. G. & Myres, J. N. L. (1936) Roman Britain and the English Settlements. (The Oxford History of England. [1].) Oxford: Clarendon Press; pp. 325–461 & bibliography
- Myres, J. N. L.; Hawkes, C. F. C.; Bruce-Mitford, Rupert; Hill, J. W. F. & Radford, C. A. Ralegh (1946). "The Archaeology of Lincolnshire and Lincoln: Anglian and Anglo-Danish Lincolnshire" (PDF). The Archaeological Journal. CIII. Royal Archaeological Institute: 85–101. doi:10.1080/00665983.1946.10853806.
- 1986: The English Settlements. (The Oxford History of England. 1B.) Oxford: Oxford University Press ISBN 0-19-282235-7; 1989 pbk edition
