= Echoes of Service =

Echoes of Service is a missionary support agency founded in 1872 based in Bath, England. Their main purpose is to serve missionaries around the world, and those commended from Christian Brethren assemblies/churches in particular, amongst whom missionary activity is common.

== History ==
The society began as a periodical named The Missionary Echo, taking inspiration from an earlier publication, The Missionary Reporter edited by James Von Summer of Tottenham. The Missionary Echo was first published in 1872 by Henry Groves and J.L. McLean and became Echoes of Service in 1885. The Continental Lands Company and the Stewards Company were set up as private businesses in 1895 and 1898 to enable the organisation to hold property and assets for missionaries who were not able to do so where they were serving.

== Role ==
The society exists to support missionaries serving outside the United Kingdom, who follow the principle of "living by faith", pioneered by missionaries such as Anthony Norris Groves and James Hudson Taylor. When the magazine assumed the new name of 'Echoes of Service', the editors included the following explanation:

"For the information of those who have not seen this periodical in its small form as the Missionary Echo, we would say that its special object is to give tidings regarding the work of servants of Christ who have gone forth to other lands with the gospel in the Lord's name only and in dependence on Him for the supply of their daily need."

Echoes provides information for local churches and individuals through the Echoes missionary magazine, published monthly, and the Echoes Daily Prayer Guide, a directory of UK overseas workers, produced annually. Telephone Echoes (recorded twice-weekly) and weekly prayer update, by fax or email, with up-to-date news and prayer requests are also offered, as well as books and fact files about many aspects of cross-cultural missionary service. They also act as a fee-free channel for funds donated to missionaries and their work, and provide information, advice and practical support for missionaries and local churches.

Echoes day is held each year in a different location around the UK.
