= Catherine Hills =

British medieval archaeologist

Catherine Mary Hills FSA
- Employer: University of Cambridge
- Known for: Early Medieval Archaeology

Catherine Mary Hills, FSA is a British archaeologist and academic, who is a leading expert in Anglo-Saxon material culture. She is a senior research fellow at the McDonald Institute for Archaeological Research, University of Cambridge.

== Education ==
In the 1960s, Hill excavated with Philip Rahtz at Beckery chapel, Glastonbury.

== Career ==
She was appointed as a lecturer in Cambridge in 1977 in the Department of Archaeology. Previous to that she was a Field Officer for Norfolk Archaeological Unit. Hills was elected as a Fellow of the Society of Antiquaries in 1978. She was a Fellow of Newnham College, Cambridge.

Hills was closely associated with the excavation of the early Anglo-Saxon cremation cemetery at Spong Hill, North Elmham, Norfolk, where she directed excavations from 1974 until the completion of excavations in 1981. Hills' post-excavation analyses of this major site led to substantial contributions in the fields of early Anglo-Saxon archaeology, particularly regarding burial and migration, and more recently the chronology of the 5th century.

She presented the Channel 4 series The Blood of the British. She was Vice-President of the Society for Medieval Archaeology from 2017-2022.

== Selected publications ==
- Hills, C. (1979). The archaeology of Anglo-Saxon England in the pagan period: A review. Anglo-Saxon England, 8, 297-329. doi:10.1017/S0263675100003112
- Hills C.M. (1986). The Blood of the British. London: George Philip
- Hills C.M. (2003). Origins of the English. London: Gerald Duckworth and Co. Ltd.
- Hills, C. (2007). History and archaeology: The state of play in early medieval Europe. Antiquity 81(311), 191-200. doi:10.1017/S0003598X0009493X
- Hills, C. (2011) Overview: Anglo-Saxon Identity. The Oxford Handbook of Anglo-Saxon Archaeology. Oxford: OUP.
- Hills C. and Lucy S. (2013). Spong Hill Part IX. Chronology and Synthesis. Cambridge: McDonald Inst of Archaeological Research.
