= British Museum Quarterly =

- Discipline: Art, art history
- Language: English
- Edited by: Trustees of the British Museum

Publication details
- History: 1926–1973
- Publisher: British Museum (United Kingdom)
- Frequency: Quarterly

Standard abbreviations
- ISO 4: Br. Mus. Q.

Indexing
- ISSN: 0007-151X
- LCCN: 2008242355
- JSTOR: 0007151X
- OCLC no.: 300432851

The British Museum Quarterly was a peer-reviewed academic journal published by the British Museum. It described recent acquisitions and research concerning the museum's collections and was published from 1926 to 1973. It is available electronically from JSTOR.
