= Benty Grange hanging bowl =

Anglo-Saxon artifact from the 7th century AD

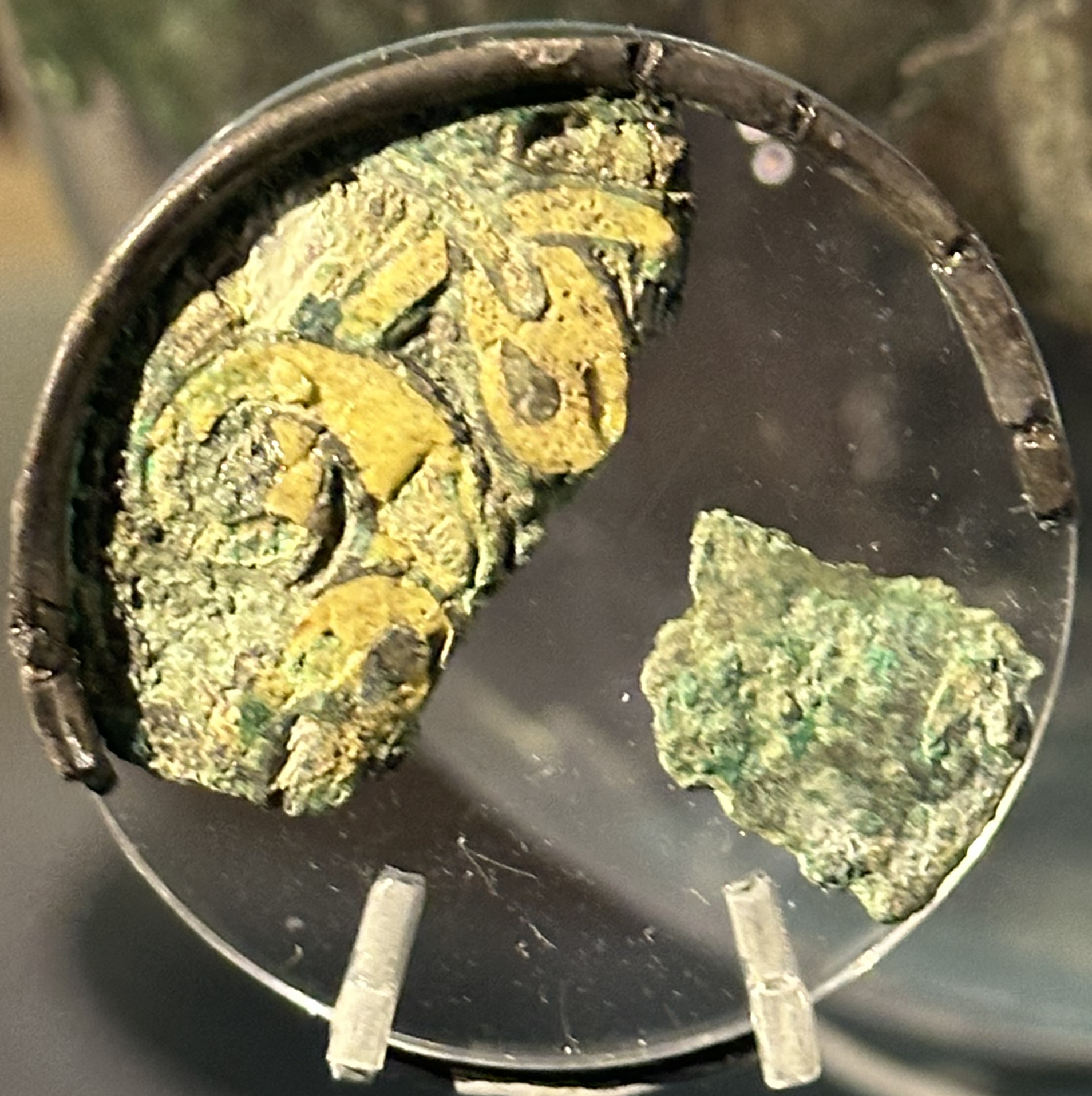
- Escutcheon in the Weston Park Museum

- Reconstructed escutcheon design (Note: After Bruce-Mitford & Raven 2005, pl. 3.)
- Material: Bronze, enamel
- Discovered: 1848; Benty Grange farm, Monyash, Derbyshire, England; 53°10′29.7″N 1°46′58.8″W
- Discovered by: Thomas Bateman
- Present location: Weston Park Museum; Ashmolean Museum
- Registration: J93.1190; AN1893.276

The Benty Grange hanging bowl is a fragmentary Anglo-Saxon artefact from the seventh century AD. All that remains are parts of two escutcheons: bronze frames that are usually circular and elaborately decorated, and that sit along the outside of the rim or at the interior base of a hanging bowl. A third one disintegrated soon after excavation, and no longer survives. The escutcheons were found in 1848 by the antiquary Thomas Bateman, while excavating a tumulus at the Benty Grange farm in western Derbyshire. They were presumably buried as part of an entire hanging bowl. The grave had probably been looted by the time of Bateman's excavation, but still contained high-status objects suggestive of a richly furnished burial, including the hanging bowl and the boar-crested Benty Grange helmet.

The surviving escutcheons are made of enamelled bronze and are 40 mm (1.6 in) in diameter. They show three dolphin-like creatures arranged in a circle, each biting the tail of the one ahead of it. Their bodies and the background are made of enamel, likely all yellow; the creatures' outlines and eyes are tinned or silvered, as are the borders of the escutcheons. Although three escutcheons from a hanging bowl at Faversham also contain dolphin-like creatures, the Benty Grange design is most closely paralleled by Insular manuscripts, particularly figures in the Durham Gospel Fragment and the Book of Durrow. Surviving illustrations of the third escutcheon show that it was of a different size and style, exhibiting a scroll-like pattern. It parallels the basal disc of a hanging bowl from Winchester and may have been originally placed at the bottom of the Benty Grange bowl.

What remains of one escutcheon belongs to Museums Sheffield and as of 2023 was in the collection of the Weston Park Museum. The other is held by the Ashmolean Museum at the University of Oxford; as of 2026, it was not on display.

== Hanging bowls ==
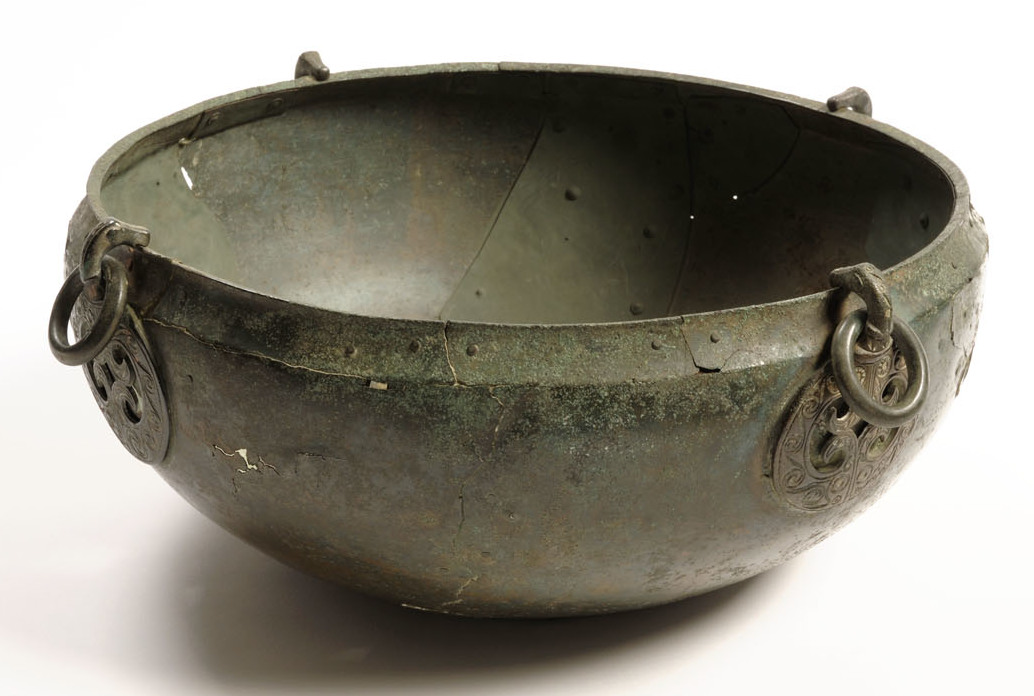
A seventh-century hanging bowl, with two hook escutcheons visible, found at Baginton

Hanging bowls are thin-walled bronze vessels with three or four equidistant hooks around the rim for suspension. They are a fixture of Late Celtic, Anglo-Saxon, and Viking archaeology and art, spanning approximately 400 AD to 1100 AD. The hooks project from escutcheons: bronze plates or frames that are usually circular or oval, that are frequently elaborately decorated, and that are riveted or soldered (or occasionally both) to the bowl. Basal escutcheons, also known as basal discs, would sometimes sit at the base of the interior. A 2005 catalogue of hanging bowls identified approximately 174 known examples, around 68 of which were relatively complete. England accounted for 117, Scotland for 7, and Ireland for 17, Norway for 26, and the remainder of Europe for 7.

The purpose of hanging bowls, and their places of manufacture, is unknown. They appear to have been manufactured by Celtic makers in Britain in the post-Roman period; examples were also used by Anglo-Saxons (who likely received bowls via trade) and, later, by Vikings. One possibility is that they were originally made by populations outside the sphere of Anglo-Saxon control, such as in the Severn Valley in southwest England and the Moray Firth in Scotland, and—as the Anglo-Saxon kingdoms extended their territories—were manufactured in progressively northern places, such as Dál Riata, Strathclyde, and Pictland, with the tradition ultimately taking root in Ireland also.

Many suggestions have been made regarding the original use of hanging bowls, including their use as lamps or lamp reflectors, votive vessels hung in churches, vessels for liturgical use such as washing hands or communion vessels, sanctuary lamps, wayside drinking vessels of the sort Edwin of Northumbria is said to have provided for travellers, finger bowls, scale pans for weighing wool, magnetic compasses, food containers, holy water stoups, wash basins, and ceremonial vessels used in mead halls. When they were acquired by Anglo-Saxons and Vikings, the bowls likely took on even more uses. Whatever their original functional purpose, by the seventh century, hanging bowls appear to have been increasingly associated with wealth and the status of their owners; during the seventh and early eighth centuries hanging bowls were a common feature in richly furnished Anglo-Saxon graves. By this point, the role of hanging bowls as a status symbol may have been more important than any functional purpose.

== Description ==
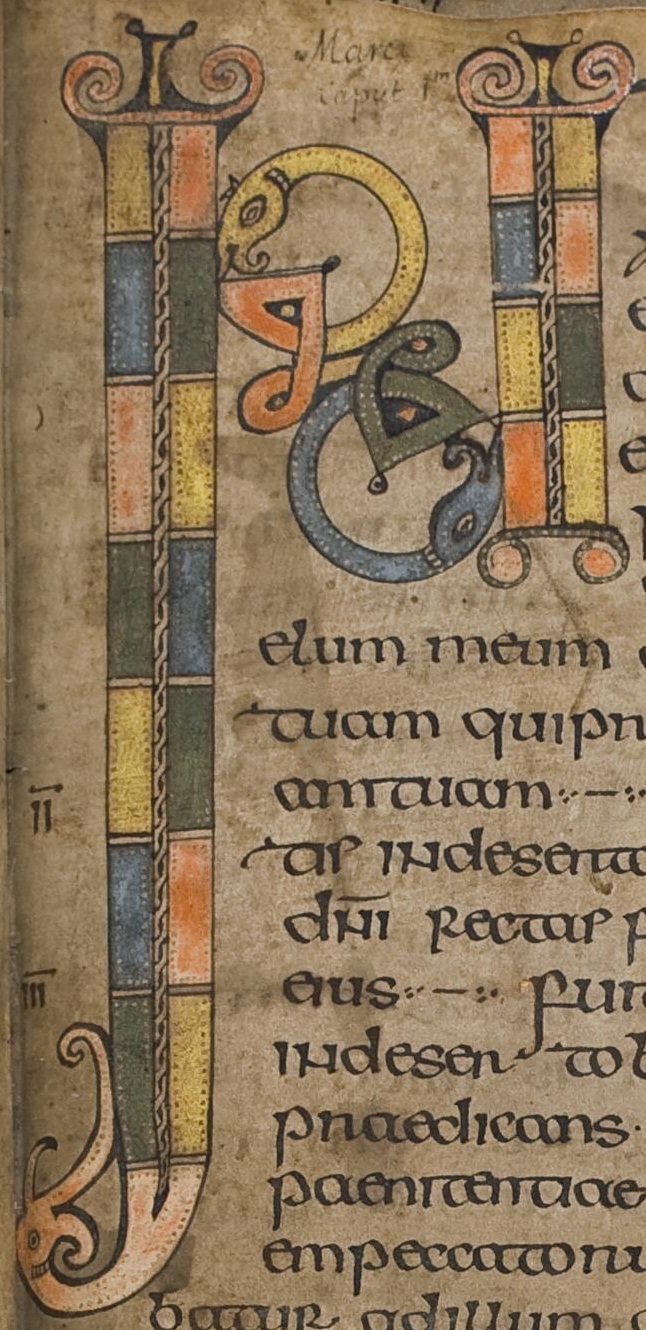
The INI monogram in the Durham Gospel Fragment contains similar fish-like creatures.

Two escutcheons are all that remain of the Benty Grange hanging bowl. They are made of enamelled bronze and are 40 mm (1.6 in) in diameter. They have the same design and plain frames, parts of which survive. Both escutcheons are fragmentary; enough survives of each for the design to be reconstructed, and, because of overlapping segments, for it to be certain that they represent two distinct pieces. Whether they are hook or basal escutcheons is uncertain, but a contemporary watercolour by Llewellynn Jewitt suggests that a hook was present at excavation, and an iron ring, 2 millimetres in width and 16 in diameter, stuck to the back of one fragment may have been part of a suspension chain. The decomposed enamel background appears uniformly yellow to the eye, as it did when excavated. A yellow-creatures-on-red-background colour scheme has alternatively been claimed, but no evidence for such a layout has been presented. As sampling of the enamel was not permitted when one of the escutcheons was analysed in 1968, the all-yellow hypothesis is not definitive. (Note: Very few hanging bowl escutcheons have yellow rather than red enamel. Many that appear yellow actually contain deteriorated red enamel; such enamel tends to be chalky or powdery instead of glassy, and visibly red enamel may remain underneath. Françoise Henry stated in 1936 that the Benty Grange escutcheons were yellow-on-red, as did Günther Haseloff in 1990—although he incorrectly attributed the two-colour theory to Rupert Bruce-Mitford. Bruce-Mitford, who conducted the 1968 analysis on the escutcheon at the Weston Park Museum, wrote that "[n]o slightest trace of red can be detected in the depths or fractures of the background or the body-filling so far as these are visible". Because sampling was not permitted, he termed the all-yellow colour scheme "a working hypothesis" while also noting that the bodies "are certainly yellow". Otherwise, they would probably be yellow-on-red.)

The reconstructed design shows three ribbon-style creatures resembling dolphins or fish, depicted in and arranged in a circle with each biting the tail of the one in front. The bodies are defined by their outlines. They are limbless, the tails curled in a circle, the jaws long and curved, and slightly ajar; the bitten tails pass under each creature's upper jaw and over its lower, but are missing where one would expect to see them passing through the gap between jaws. Each creature has a small eye shaped like a pointed oval. The outer borders of the discs, the plain frames, and the contours and eyes of the creatures are all tinned or silvered.

Surviving records of the third escutcheon indicate that it was of a different style and size. Drawings by Bateman and Jewitt show it with a scroll pattern and small piece of frame. It appears to have been about half the size of the other two, and may have originally been placed at the bottom of the hanging bowl.

The escutcheons were presumably part of an entire hanging bowl when buried. Nothing else survives. A mass of corroded chainwork discovered 6 feet (1.8 m) away, which survives only in illustrations by Jewitt and descriptions by Bateman, is unlikely to be related; although a large and intricate chain was found with a cauldron from Sutton Hoo, the Benty Grange chains appear dissimilar. The Benty Grange chainwork was also probably too heavy to have been used to suspend the hanging bowl.

== Parallels ==
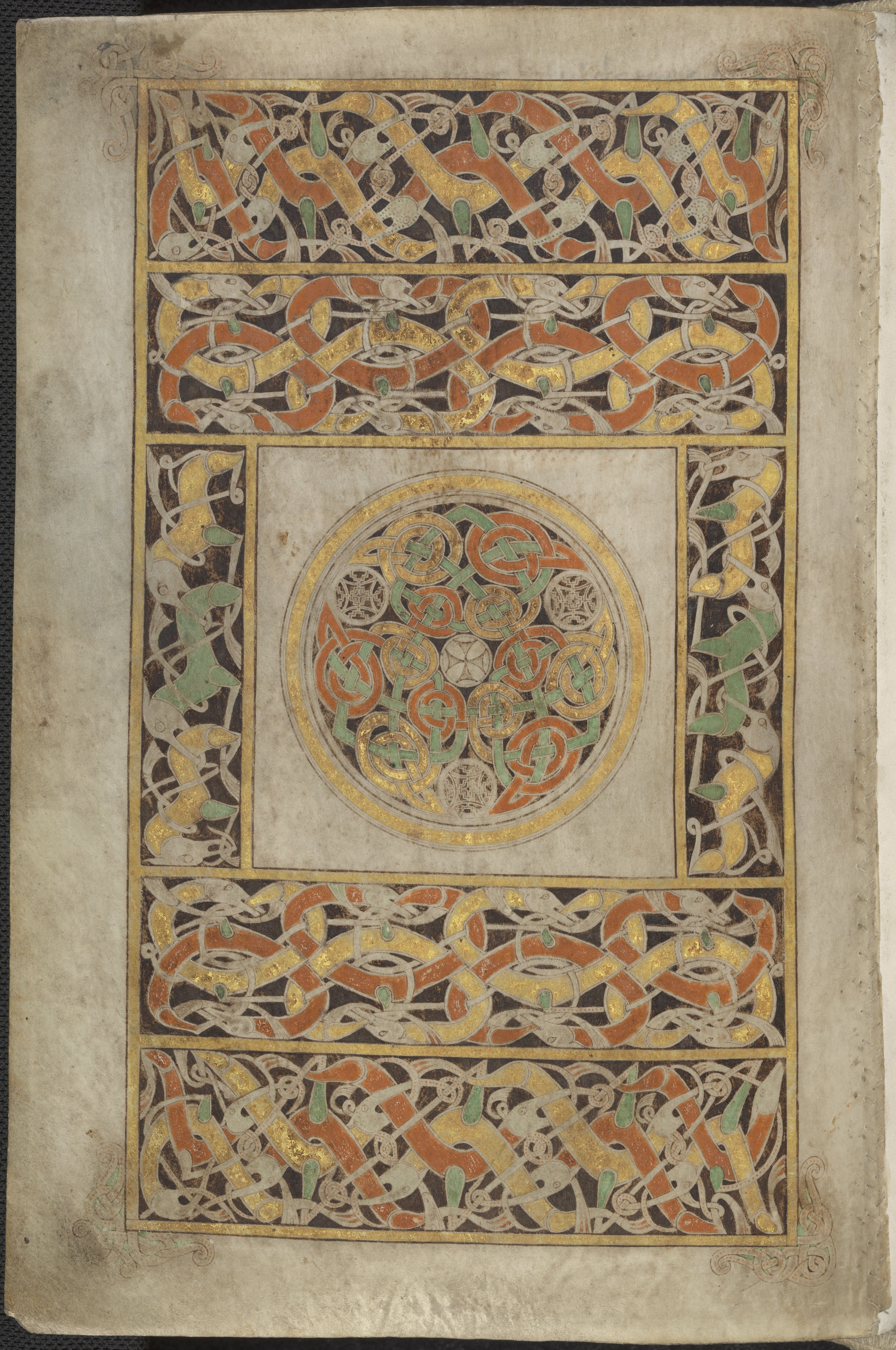
Similar dolphin-like creatures from the Book of Durrow

The dolphin-like designs on the Benty Grange hanging bowl are paralleled by designs on other escutcheons, and even more closely by designs on medieval illuminated manuscripts. Three escutcheons from a hanging bowl found in Faversham show creatures that also look like dolphins, but with more detailed bodies; a better parallel is with a disc found near the Lullingstone hanging bowl which dates to the late seventh century and is also decorated with dolphin-like creatures. Two other sixth- or seventh-century discs, found in Chilton and Coltishall, also depict intertwined serpent-like creatures attempting to eat their own tails. The third escutcheon from Benty Grange, meanwhile, surviving only in illustration, is most closely paralleled by the basal disc of the Winchester hanging bowl.

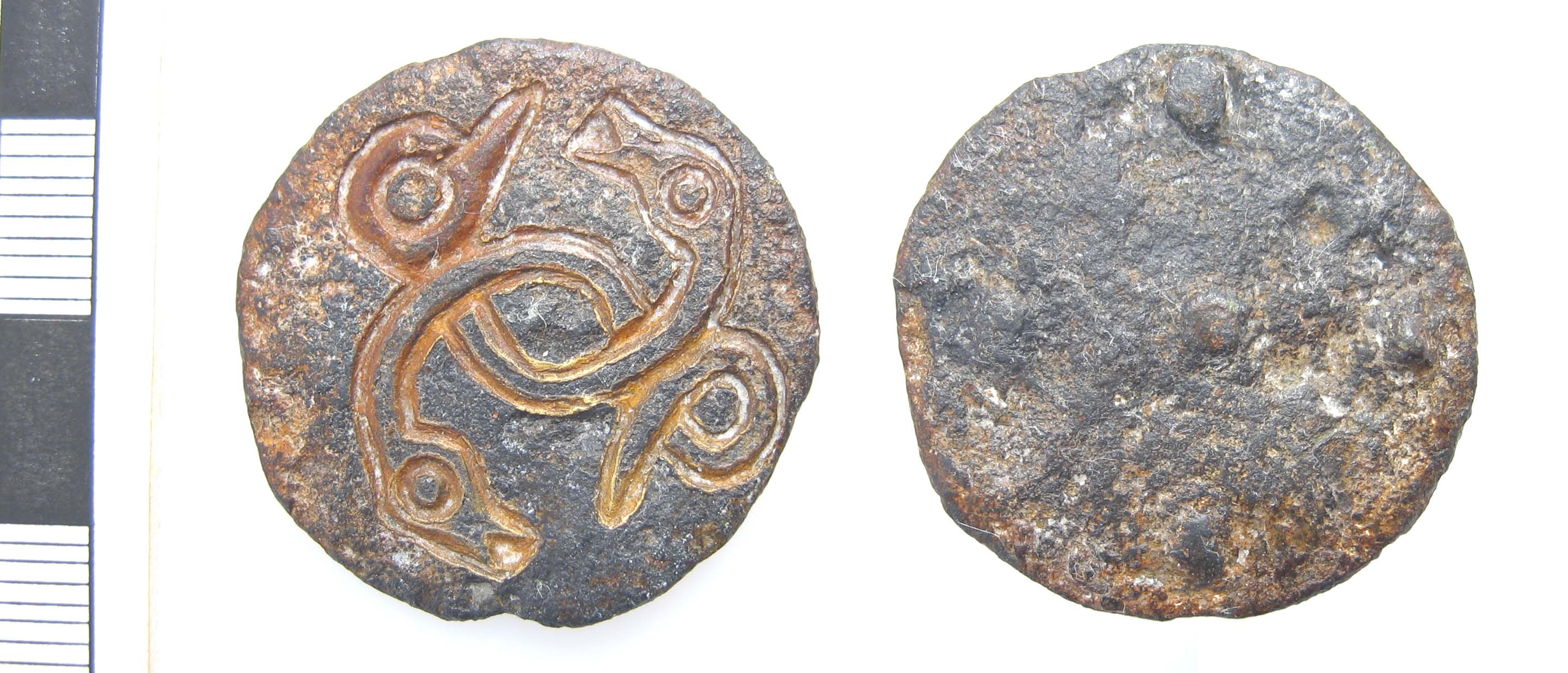
The Chilton disc.

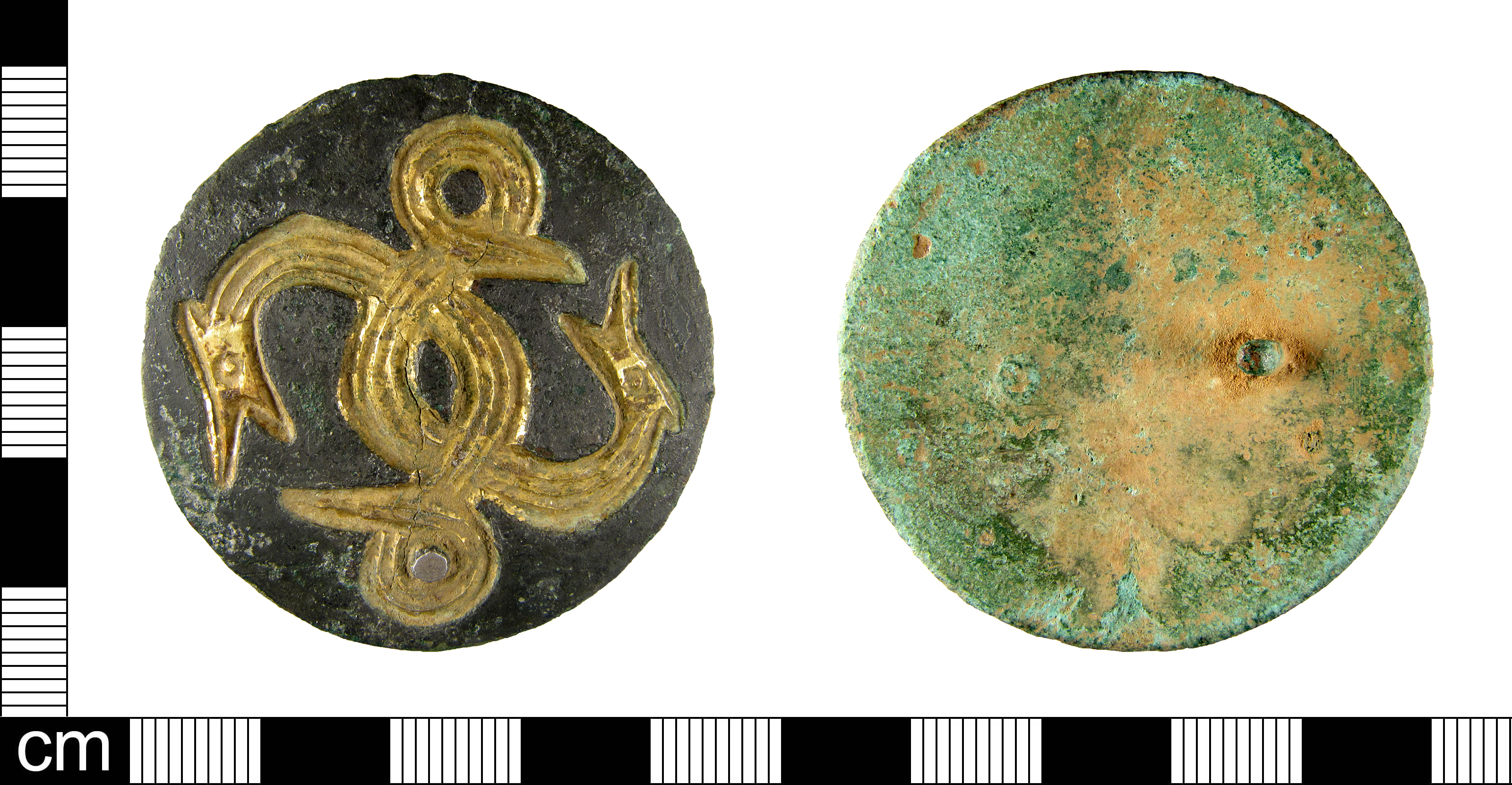
The Coltishall disc.

Even closer parallels to the Benty Grange designs are found in manuscript illustrations. Bateman remarked on this as early as 1861, noting that similar patterns were used in "several manuscripts of the [seventh] Century, for the purpose of decorating the initial letters". Metalwork designs like those on the Benty Grange escutcheons may have inspired aspects of the manuscript art. In particular, the mid-seventh-century Durham Gospel Fragment contains two similar fish-like motifs contained within the lateral stroke of the INI monogram that introduces the Gospel of Mark. The Book of Durrow also contains an illustration of similarly linked yellow dolphin-like creatures.

== Date ==
The Benty Grange hanging bowl is dated by most experts to the second half of the seventh century, based on its design and the associated finds from the barrow in which it was found. Given the presence of a helmet and cup with silver crosses, wrote Audrey Ozanne, "[t]he straightforward interpretation of this find would seem to be that it dates from a period subsequent to the official introduction of Christianity into Mercia in 655". The surviving escutcheons also suggest a date in the mid-seventh century, given their resemblance to the illustrations in the Durham Gospel Fragment and the Book of Durrow; the Winchester hanging bowl's basal disc, which the third Benty Grange escutcheon resembles, has traditionally been given the same date.

== Discovery ==
=== Location ===
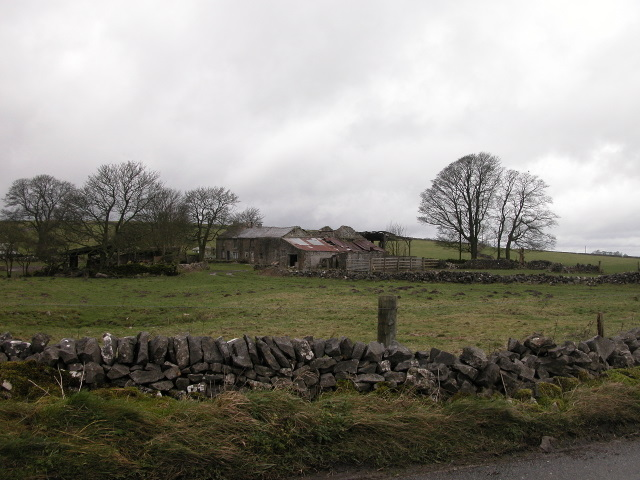
Benty Grange Farm, in the parish of Monyash in the Derbyshire Dales district

The hanging bowl was discovered in a barrow on the Benty Grange farm in Derbyshire, in what is now the Peak District National Park. Thomas Bateman, an archaeologist and antiquarian who led the excavation, (Note: Bateman excavated more than 500 barrows in his lifetime, earning him the moniker "The Barrow Knight".) described Benty Grange as "a high and bleak situation"; its barrow, which still survives, is prominently located by a major Roman road, now roughly parallel to the A515 in the area, possibly to display the burial to passing travellers. The barrow is one of several tumuli in the vicinity and may have also been designed to share the skyline with two other nearby monuments, Arbor Low stone circle and Gib Hill barrow.

The seventh-century Peak District was a small buffer province between Mercia and Northumbria, occupied, according to the Tribal Hidage, by the Anglo-Saxon Pecsæte. (Note: The Tribal Hidage is a list of territories south of the Humber, sized by hides, which were used as a measure of taxation. Though the list has been variously dated between the mid-seventh and the late-eighth centuries, it may mix earlier and later calculations, and include information from as late as the tenth century; it survives in several manuscripts, the latest of which dates to around the eleventh century.) The area came under the control of the Mercian kingdom around the eighth century; the Benty Grange and other rich barrows suggest that the Pecsæte may have had their own dynasty beforehand, but there is no written evidence for this.

=== Excavation ===
Bateman excavated the barrow on 3 May 1848. Although he did not mention it in his account, he was probably not the first person to dig up the grave. The fact that the objects were found in two clusters 6 feet (1.8 m) apart, and that other objects that normally accompany a helmet, such as a sword and shield, were absent, suggests that the grave had previously been looted. Given the size of the mound, an alternative (or additional) explanation is that it originally contained two burials, only one of which Bateman discovered. (Note: Llewellynn Jewitt suggested in 1870 that there had been two burials, writing that "In this mound, although a curious and unique helmet, the silver mountings of a leather drinking-cup, some highly interesting and beautiful enamelled ornaments, and other objects, as well as indications of the garments, remained, not a vestige of the body, with the exception of some of the hair, was to be seen. The lovely and delicate form of the female and the form of the stalwart warrior or noble had alike returned to their parent earth, leaving no trace behind, save the enamel of her teeth and traces of his hair alone, while the ornaments they wore and took pride in, and the surroundings of their stations, remained to tell their tale at this distant date.")

The barrow comprises a circular central mound approximately 15 m (50 ft) in diameter and 0.6 m (2 ft) high, an encircling fosse about 1 m (3.3 ft) wide and 0.3 m (1 ft) deep, and outer penannular earthworks around 3 m (10 ft) wide and 0.2 m (0.66 ft) high. The entire structure measures approximately 23 by 22 m (75 by 72 ft). Bateman suggested a body once lay at its centre, flat against the original surface of the soil; what he described as the one remnant, strands of hair, is now thought to be from a cloak of fur, cowhide or something similar. The recovered objects were found in two clusters. One cluster was found in the area of the supposed hair, the other about 6 ft (1.8 m) to the west. In the latter area Bateman described "a large mass of oxydized iron" which, when removed and washed, presented itself as a jumbled collection of chainwork, a six-pronged piece of iron resembling a hayfork, and the boar crested Benty Grange helmet.

In the area of the supposed hair, Bateman described "a curious assemblage of ornaments", which were difficult to remove successfully from the hardened earth. This included a cup identified as leather but probably of wood, approximately 3 in (7.6 cm) in diameter at the mouth. Its rim was edged with silver, and its surface was "decorated by four wheel-shaped ornaments and two crosses of thin silver, affixed by pins of the same metal, clenched inside". Also found were "a knot of very fine wire", some "thin bone variously ornamented with lozenges &c." attached to silk, but that soon decayed when exposed to air, and the Benty Grange hanging bowl. As Bateman described it

The other articles found in the same situation are principally personal ornaments, of the same scroll pattern as those figured at page 25 of the Vestiges of the Antiquities of Derbyshire;—of these enamels, there were two upon copper, with silver frames; and another of some composition which fell to dust almost immediately: the prevailing colour in all is yellow.

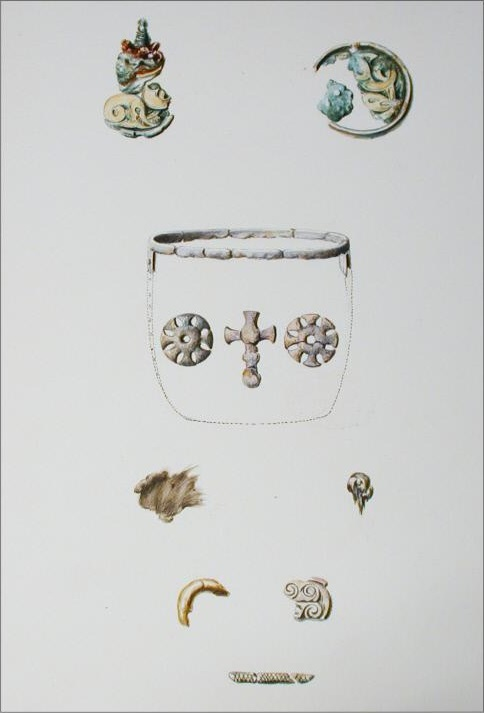
A contemporary watercolour by Llewellynn Jewitt depicts the surviving escutcheons, top, fragments of the third escutcheon, second-to-bottom row, and associated finds.

Bateman closed his 1848 account of the excavation by noting the "particularly corrosive nature of the soil", which by 1861 he said "has generally been the case in tumuli in Derbyshire". He suggested that this was the result of "a mixing or tempering with some corrosive liquid; the result of which is the presence of thin ochrey veins in the earth, and the decomposition of nearly the whole of the human remains." Bateman's friend Llewellynn Jewitt, an artist and antiquarian who frequently accompanied Bateman on excavations, painted four watercolours of the finds, parts of which were included in Bateman's 1848 account. (Note: The four watercolours are now in the collection of the Weston Park Museum.) This was more than Jewitt produced for any other of their excavations, a mark of the importance that they assigned to the Benty Grange barrow.

The hanging bowl escutcheons entered Bateman's extensive collection. On 27 October 1848 he reported his discoveries, including the helmet, cup, and hanging bowl, at a meeting of the British Archaeological Association, and in 1855 they were catalogued along with other objects from the Benty Grange barrow. In 1861 Bateman died at age 39, and in 1876 his son, Thomas W. Bateman, loaned the collection to the town council (the Corporation of Sheffield). It was displayed at the Weston Park Museum through 1893, at which point the younger Bateman, having spent his father's fortune, was forced to sell by order of chancery. The Corporation of Sheffield purchased many of the objects that had been excavated in Yorkshire, Derbyshire, and Staffordshire, including the helmet, the cup fittings, and one of the hanging bowl escutcheons; other pieces were dispersed by Sotheby's, and later in 1893 the second escutcheon was presented to the Ashmolean Museum at the University of Oxford by Sir John Evans. As of 2021 and 2023, respectively, the escutcheons remain in the collections of the two museums.

The Benty Grange barrow was designated a scheduled monument on 23 October 1970. The list entry notes that "[a]lthough the centre of Benty Grange [barrow] has been partially disturbed by excavation, the monument is otherwise undisturbed and retains significant archaeological remains." It goes on to note that further excavation would yield new information. The surrounding fields were designated a Site of Special Scientific Interest in 2013, and are used for agricultural purposes. The nearby farmhouse was renovated between 2012 and 2014; and as of 2023 is used as a holiday cottage.

=== Publication ===
Bateman published an article on the Benty Grange excavation in October 1848, five months after excavating the barrow, in The Journal of the British Archaeological Association. The finds were included in his 1855 catalogue of his collection, and shortly before his death, Bateman revised and expanded upon his 1848 account in his 1861 book Ten Years' Digging in Celtic and Saxon Grave Hills. Llewellynn Jewitt commented upon the finds, including the hanging bowl, in his 1870 book Grave-Mounds and their Contents.

The hanging bowl was one of the first to be discovered, and in 1898 John Romilly Allen included it among 16 examples in the first English article to discuss hanging bowls as a distinct class of artefacts. It was frequently mentioned in the literature thereafter, including reconstructions by T. D. Kendrick in 1932 and 1938, Françoise Henry in 1936, Audrey Ozanne in 1962–1963, George Speake in 1980, and Jane Brenan in 1991. Rupert Bruce-Mitford published a chapter on the Benty Grange burial in 1974, focusing on the helmet, and published what he termed a definitive reconstruction of the escutcheons in 1987; in his posthumous 2005 work A Corpus of Late Celtic Hanging-Bowls he added a full description of the hanging bowl, and a colour reconstruction of the escutcheons.

== Bibliography ==
- Allen, John Romilly (1898). "Metal Bowls of the Late-Celtic and Anglo-Saxon Periods". Archaeologia. LVI. London: Society of Antiquaries of London: 39–56. doi:10.1017/s0261340900003842.
- "Anglo-Saxon Antiquities". The Times. No. 20, 007. London. 30 October 1848. p. 4 – via Newspapers.com.
- "Anglo-Saxon Antiquities". The Morning Post. No. 23, 370. London. 1 November 1848. p. 2 – via Newspapers.com.
- "Anglo-Saxon Antiquities". The Ipswich Journal. No. 5, 713. Ipswich. 4 November 1848. p. 4 – via Newspapers.com.
- "Anglo-Saxon bronze hanging bowl". Hampshire Cultural Trust.
- Bateman, Thomas (1848a). Vestiges of the Antiquities of Derbyshire and the Sepulchral Usages of its Inhabitants, from the Most Remote Ages to the Reformation. London: John Russell Smith.
- Bateman, Thomas (October 1848b). "Description of the Contents of a Saxon Barrow". The Journal of the British Archaeological Association. IV (3). London: Henry George Bohn: 276–279. doi:10.1080/00681288.1848.11886866.
- Bateman, Thomas (1855). A Descriptive Catalogue of the Antiquities and Miscellaneous Objects Preserved in the Museum of Thomas Bateman, at Lomberdale House, Derbyshire. Bakewell: James Gratton.
- Bateman, Thomas (1861). "Barrows: Benty Grange Near Monyash". Ten Years' Digging in Celtic and Saxon Grave Hills, in the Counties of Derby, Stafford, and York, from 1848 to 1858; with Notices of Some Former Discoveries, Hitherto Unpublished, and Remarks on the Crania and Pottery from the Mounds. London: John Russell Smith. pp. 28–33.
- Benty Grange [@BentyGrange] (22 August 2014). "We are proud to open the doors to Benty Grange to our first guests. We couldn't have done it without @PeakVenues . THANKS" (Tweet) – via Twitter.
- "Benty Grange – Barn Conversion – Peak Venues". Peak Venues.
- "Benty Grange SSSI". Designated Sites. Natural England.
- Blair, John (2014). "The Tribal Hidage". In Lapidge, Michael; Blair, John; Keynes, Simon & Scragg, Donald (eds.). The Wiley Blackwell Encyclopedia of Anglo-Saxon England (2nd ed.). Chichester: Blackwell Publishing. pp. 473–475. doi:10.1002/9781118316061.ch20. ISBN 978-0-470-65632-7.
- Brenan, Jane (1991). Hanging Bowls and their Contexts: An Archaeological Survey of Their Socio-Economic Significance from the Fifth to Seventh Centuries A.D. British Archaeological Reports. Vol. 220. Tempus Reparatum. ISBN 0-86054-724-8.
- Brown, Antony (October 2017). "Dowlow Quarry ROMP Environmental Statement Appendix 10.2: Setting Assessment" (PDF). ARS Ltd Reports. 2017 (82). Archived from the original (PDF) on 10 February 2018.
- Brown, David (1981). "Swastika Patterns". In Evison, Vera Ivy (ed.). Angles, Saxons, and Jutes: Essays Presented to J. N. L. Myres. Oxford: Clarendon Press. pp. 227–240. ISBN 978-0-19-813402-2.
- Bruce-Mitford, Rupert (1974). Aspects of Anglo-Saxon Archaeology: Sutton Hoo and Other Discoveries. London: Victor Gollancz Limited. ISBN 0-575-01704-X.
- Bruce-Mitford, Rupert (1987). "Ireland and the Hanging Bowls – A Review". In Ryan, Michael (ed.). Ireland and Insular Art, A.D. 500–1200: Proceedings of a Conference at University College Cork, 31 October – 3 November 1985. Dublin: Royal Irish Academy. pp. 30–39. ISBN 0-901714-54-2.
- Bruce-Mitford, Rupert & Raven, Sheila (2005). A Corpus of Late Celtic Hanging-Bowls with an Account of the Bowls Found in Scandinavia. Oxford: Oxford University Press. ISBN 978-0-19-813410-7.
- Colgrave, Bertram & Mynors, R. A. B., eds. (1969). Bede's Ecclesiastical History of the English People. Oxford Medieval Tests. Oxford: Clarendon Press.
- "Escutcheon of hanging bowl". Ashmolean Museum. University of Oxford.
- Fowler, Elizabeth (1968). "Hanging Bowls". In Coles, John Morton & Simpson, Derek Douglas Alexander (eds.). Studies in Ancient Europe: Essays Presented to Stuart Piggott. Leicester: Leicester University Press. pp. 287–310. ISBN 0-7185-1079-8.
- "Fragments of enamelled escutcheon from Benty Grange". I Dig Sheffield. Museums Sheffield.
- Goss, William Henry (1889). The Life and Death of Llewellynn Jewitt, F.S.A., Etc., with Fragmentary Memoirs of Some of his Famous Literary and Artistic Friends, Especially of Samuel Carter Hall, F.S.A., Etc. London: Henry Gray.
- "hanging bowl (.1248.'70)". The British Museum Collection Online. The British Museum.
- "hanging bowl (.1248.a.'70)". The British Museum Collection Online. The British Museum.
- "hanging bowl (.1248.b.'70)". The British Museum Collection Online. The British Museum.
- Haseloff, Günther (1958). "Fragments of a Hanging-Bowl from Bekesbourne, Kent, and Some Ornamental Problems" (PDF). Medieval Archaeology. 2. Translated by de Paor, Liam: 72–103. doi:10.1080/00766097.1958.11735474.
- Haseloff, Günther (1990). Email im frühen Mittelalter: Frühchristliche Kunst von der Spätantike bis zu den Karolingern [Enamel in the Early Middle Ages: Early Christian Art from Late Antiquity to the Carolingians] (in German). Marburg: Hitzeroth. ISBN 3-89398-020-2.
- Henry, Françoise (31 December 1936). "Hanging Bowls". The Journal of the Royal Society of Antiquaries of Ireland. 7th series. VI (II). Dublin: Royal Society of Antiquaries of Ireland: 209–246. JSTOR 25513828.

- Henry's original drawing available at "Sketch of Benty Grange escutcheon". UCD Digital Library. University College Dublin.

- Historic England. "Benty Grange hlaew, Monyash (1013767)". National Heritage List for England.
- Howarth, Elijah (1899). Catalogue of the Bateman Collection of Antiquities in the Sheffield Public Museum. London: Dulau and Co.
- Geake, Helen (1999). "When Were Hanging Bowls Deposited in Anglo-Saxon Graves?" (PDF). Medieval Archaeology. 43: 1–18. doi:10.1080/00766097.1999.11735623.
- Jewitt, Llewellynn (1870). Grave-Mounds and their Contents: A Manual of Archæology, as Exemplified in the Burials of the Celtic, the Romano-British, and the Anglo-Saxon Periods. London: Groombridge and Sons.
- Kendrick, T. D. (June 1932). "British Hanging Bowls". Antiquity. VI (22): 161–184. doi:10.1017/S0003598X00006700. S2CID 163210163.
- Kendrick, T. D. (1938). Anglo-Saxon Art to A.D. 900. London: Methuen & Co. Ltd.
- Keynes, Simon (2014). "Mercia". In Lapidge, Michael; Blair, John; Keynes, Simon & Scragg, Donald (eds.). The Wiley Blackwell Encyclopedia of Anglo-Saxon England (2nd ed.). Chichester: Blackwell Publishing. pp. 311–313. doi:10.1002/9781118316061.ch13. ISBN 978-0-470-65632-7.
- Kirby, David Peter (1991). "The Tribal Hidage". The Earliest English Kings. London: Unwin Hyman. pp. 9–12. ISBN 0-04-445691-3.
- Lester, Geoff (Fall 1987). "The Anglo-Saxon Helmet from Benty Grange, Derbyshire" (PDF). Old English Newsletter. 21 (1): 34–35. ISSN 0030-1973.
- Liestøl, Aslak (1953). "The Hanging Bowl, a Liturgical and Domestic Vessel". Acta Archaeologica. XXIV: 163–170. ISSN 0065-101X.
- Longley, David (1975). Hanging-Bowls, Penannular Brooches and the Anglo-Saxon Connexion. British Archaeological Reports. Vol. 22.
- McRoberts, David (1963). "The Ecclesiastical Significance of the St Ninian's Isle Treasure". Proceedings of the Society of Antiquaries of Scotland. XCIV. Edinburgh: Society of Antiquaries of Scotland: 301–314. doi:10.9750/PSAS.094.301.314.
- Mitchell, Hugh Parker (February 1923). "Flotsam of Later Anglo-Saxon Art: I". The Burlington Magazine for Connoisseurs. LXII (CCXXXIX): 63–72. JSTOR 861685.
- Ozanne, Audrey (1962–1963). "The Peak Dwellers" (PDF). Medieval Archaeology. 6–7: 15–52. doi:10.1080/00766097.1962.11735659.
- "Record ID: BERK-F72627 – Early Medieval Mount". Portable Antiquities Scheme. 13 March 2017.
- "Record ID: ESS-806BCA – Early Medieval Mount". Portable Antiquities Scheme. 20 April 2017.
- Rushforth, Rebecca (2004). "The Barrow Knight, the Bristol Bibliographer, and a Lost Old English Prayer". Transactions of the Cambridge Bibliographical Society. XIII (1): 112–131. JSTOR 41154940.
- "Site record MDR11318 – Roman Road ('The Street') (conjectural route of), Buxton to Derby, High Peak and Derbyshire Dales". Derbyshire Historic Environment Record. Derbyshire County Council. 27 September 2023.
- Small, Alan; Thomas, Charles & Wilson, David M. (1973). St. Ninian's Isle and its Treasure: Text. Vol. I. London: Oxford University Press. ISBN 0-19-714101-3.
- Smith, Reginald Allender (1908). "Untitled [Notes on Brooches, Bronze Hanging-Bowls, and Enamelled Mounts]". Proceedings of the Society of Antiquaries of London. 2nd series. XXII. London: Society of Antiquaries of London: 63–86. doi:10.1017/S0950797300002158.
- Speake, George (1980). Anglo-Saxon Animal Art. Oxford: Clarendon Press. ISBN 0-19-813194-1. LCCN 79-41091.
- Vierck, Hayo (December 1970). "Cortina Tripodis: Zu Aufhängung und Gebrauch subrömischer Hängebecken aus Britannien und Irland" [Cortina Tripodis: On the suspension and use of Roman hanging basins from Britain and Ireland]. Frühmittelalterliche Studien (Early medieval studies) (in German). 4: 8–52. doi:10.1515/9783110242041.8. S2CID 188786864.
- "Watercolour of finds from Benty Grange including escutcheon and cup fittings". I Dig Sheffield. Museums Sheffield.
- "Watercolour Showing Fragments of Metal Chainwork". I Dig Sheffield. Museums Sheffield.
- "Watercolour Showing Fragments of Metal Chainwork". I Dig Sheffield. Museums Sheffield.
- "Watercolour showing the helmet from Benty Grange". I Dig Sheffield. Museums Sheffield.
- Webster, Leslie (2012). Anglo-Saxon Art: A New History. London: The British Museum Press. ISBN 978-0-7141-2809-2.
- "Weekly List of Applications Validated by the Authority: Applications validated between 18/072012 – 24/07/2012" (PDF). Peak District National Park Authority. Archived from the original (PDF) on 24 June 2017.
- Yorke, Barbara (1990). Kings and Kingdoms of Early Anglo-Saxon England. London: Routledge. ISBN 0-415-16639-X.

- Republished as an ebook as Yorke, Barbara (2003) [1990]. Kings and Kingdoms of Early Anglo-Saxon England (PDF). London: Routledge. ISBN 0-203-44730-1.

- Youngs, Susan (2009). "Anglo-Saxon, Irish and British Relations: Hanging-Bowls Reconsidered". In Graham-Campbell, James & Ryan, Michael (eds.). Anglo-Saxon/Irish Relations before the Vikings. Oxford: Oxford University Press. pp. 205–230. doi:10.5871/bacad/9780197264508.003.0009. ISBN 978-0-19-726450-8.
