= Benty Grange helmet =

7th-century boar-crested Anglo-Saxon helmet

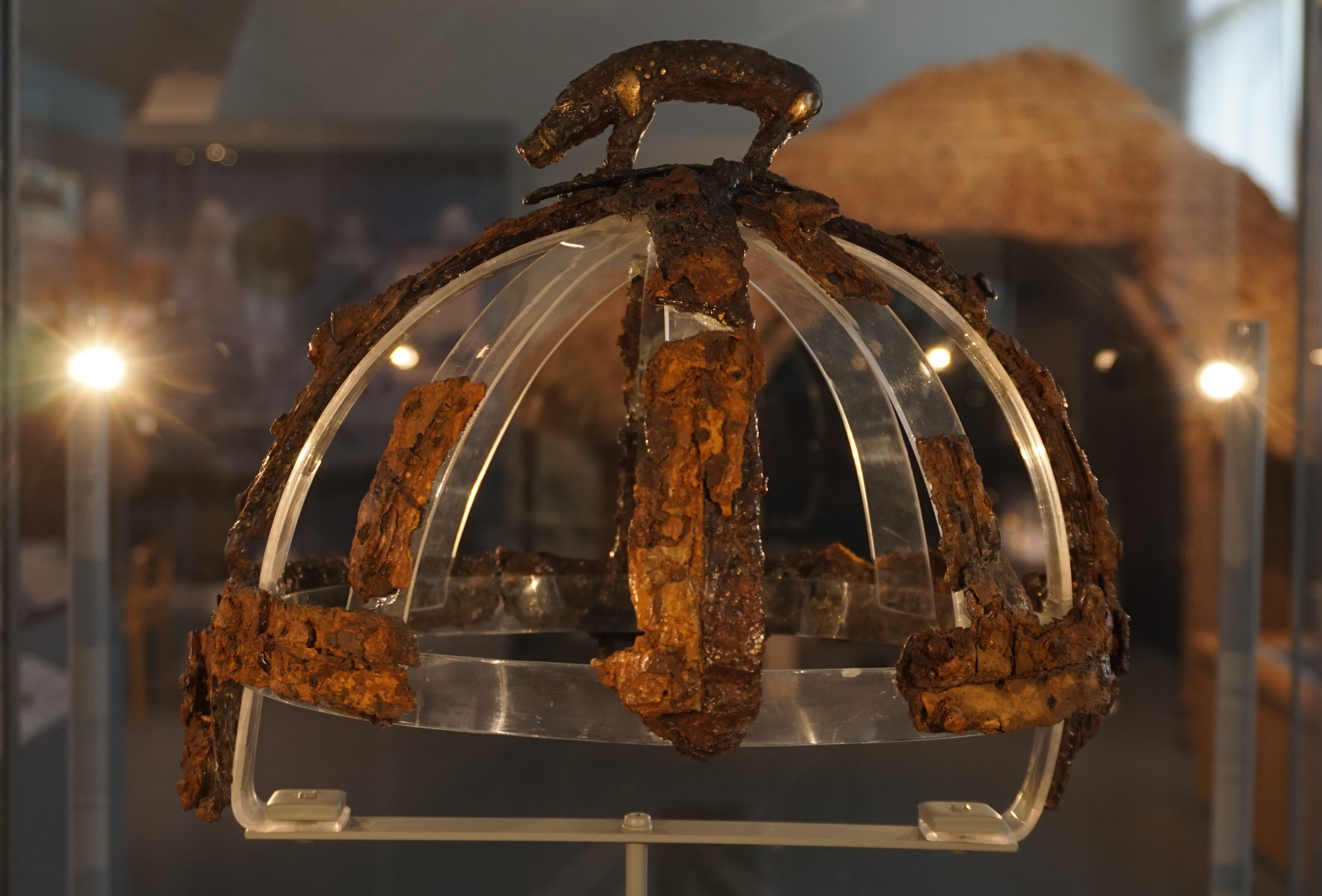
- The Benty Grange helmet, on a modern transparent support
- Material: Iron, horn
- Weight: 1.441 kg (3.18 lb) (replica)
- Discovered: 1848; Benty Grange farm, Monyash, Derbyshire, England; 53°10′29.6″N 01°46′58.7″W
- Discovered by: Thomas Bateman
- Present location: Weston Park Museum, Sheffield
- Registration: J93.1189

The Benty Grange helmet is an Anglo-Saxon boar-crested helmet from the 7th century AD. It was excavated by Thomas Bateman in 1848 from a tumulus at the Benty Grange farm in Monyash in western Derbyshire. The grave had probably been looted by the time of Bateman's excavation, but still contained other high-status objects suggestive of a richly furnished burial, such as the fragmentary remains of a hanging bowl. The helmet is displayed at Sheffield's Weston Park Museum, which purchased it from Bateman's estate in 1893.

The helmet was constructed by covering the outside of an iron framework with plates of horn and the inside with cloth or leather; the organic material has since decayed. The helmet would have provided some protection against weapons, but was also ornate and may have been intended for ceremonial use. It was the first Anglo-Saxon helmet to be discovered, with five others found since: Sutton Hoo (1939), Coppergate (1982), Wollaston (1997), Shorwell (2004) and Staffordshire (2009). The helmet features a unique combination of structural and technical attributes, but contemporaneous parallels exist for its individual characteristics. It is classified as one of the "crested helmets" used in Northern Europe from the 6th to 11th centuries AD.

The most striking feature of the helmet is the boar at its apex; this pagan symbol faces towards a Christian cross on the nasal in a display of syncretism. This is representative of 7th-century England when Christian missionaries were slowly converting Anglo-Saxons away from traditional Germanic paganism. The helmet seems to exhibit a stronger preference toward paganism, with a large boar and a small cross. The cross may have been added for talismanic effect, the help of any god being welcome on the battlefield. The boar atop the crest was likewise associated with protection and suggests a time when boar-crested helmets may have been common, as do the helmet from Wollaston and the Guilden Morden boar. The contemporary epic Beowulf mentions such helmets five times and speaks of the strength of men "when the hefted sword, its hammered edge and gleaming blade slathered in blood, razes the sturdy boar-ridge off a helmet".

== Description ==
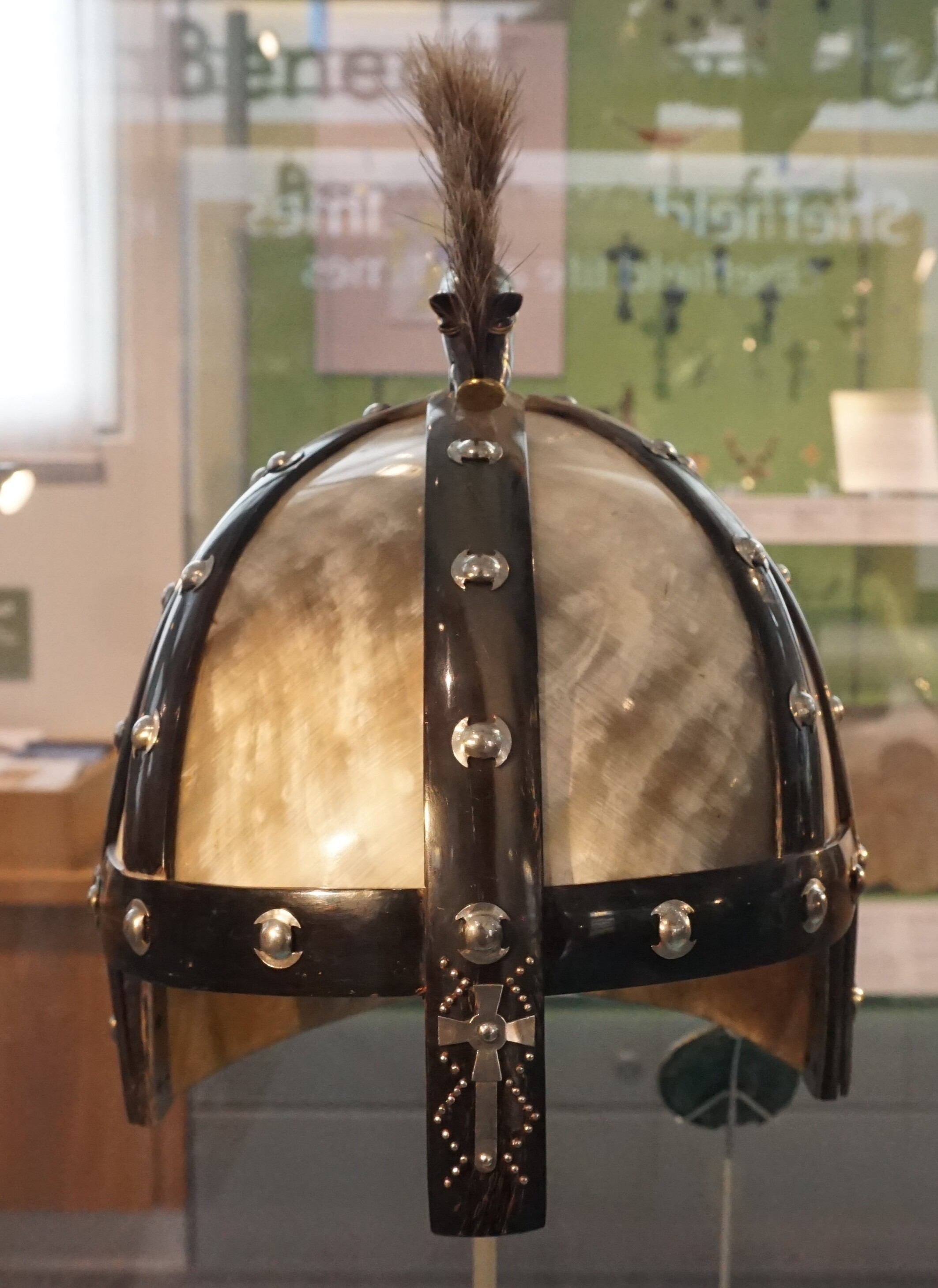
Replica of the Benty Grange helmet at Weston Park Museum in Sheffield

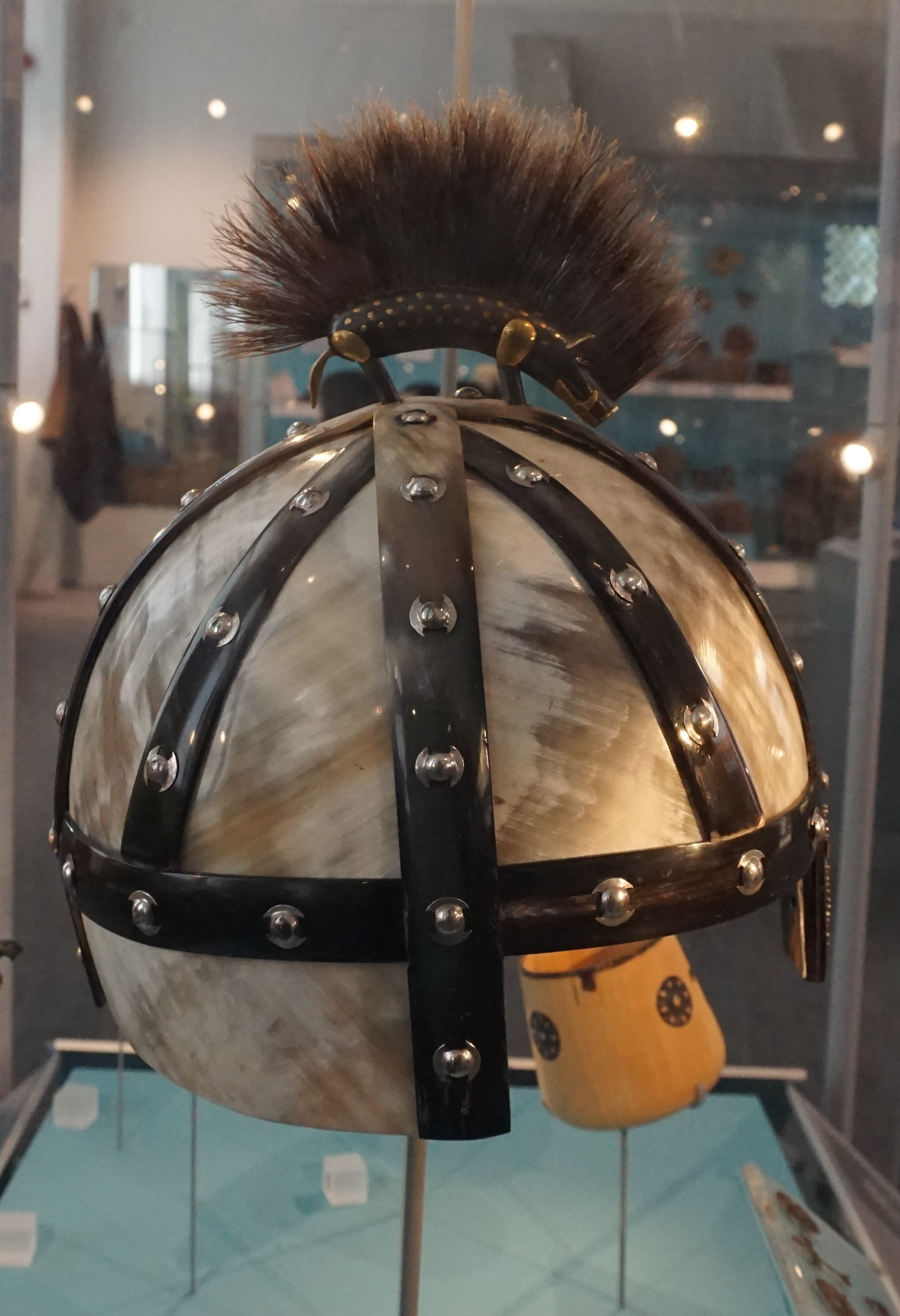
Side view of the replica

The Benty Grange helmet was made by covering an iron frame with horn. It probably weighed about 1.4 kg (3.1 lb), the weight of the Weston Park Museum's 1986 replica. The framework, which now exists in sixteen corroded fragments, originally consisted of seven iron strips, each between 1 and 2 millimetres thick. A brow band, 65 cm (26 in) long and 2.5 cm (1.0 in) wide, encircled the head. Two strips of the same width ran from front to back, and from side to side. The 40 cm (16 in) long nose-to-nape band extended 4.75 cm (1.87 in) in the front and 3.8 cm (1.5 in) in the back; the extension over the nose was straight, whereas the extension at the back was curved inwards, so as to fit the nape of the wearer. The lateral band ran from ear to ear; both ends are broken off slightly below the brow band, but it would have extended further as part of a cheek or ear protection. It was affixed to the outside of the dexter (wearer's right) side of the brow band, the inside of the sinister (wearer's left) side, and the outside of the nose-to-nape band. The four quadrants created by this configuration were each subdivided by a narrower subsidiary strip of iron, only one of which now survives. Each subsidiary strip was attached to the outside of the brow band 7 cm (2.8 in) from the centre of the lateral band. Here they were 22 mm (0.87 in) wide, and, while tapering towards a width of 15 mm (0.59 in), rose at a 70° angle towards the lateral band, which they overlapped at a 50° angle just beneath the crest. The inside of the helmet was most likely originally lined with leather or cloth, since decayed.

Eight plates of horn, probably softened and bent and suggested to be from cattle, (Note: Writing in 1974 about his 1940s examination of the helmet, Rupert Bruce-Mitford stated that "experiments were carried out by softening and spreading a horn from a shorthorn breed. It was clear that a much bigger horned breed of cattle must have been involved in the construction. This was presumably bos longifrons; and there is no need to postulate aurochs." Bos longifrons was thought then to be a species descended from aurochs and ancestor to modern cattle, but is now understood to be indistinct from the latter. On the 1986 replica, black-tipped white horns from a breed of Northumbrian cattle, which had been in the country for 800 years, was used.) were cut to fit the eight spaces created by the iron frame. No horn now survives, but mineralized traces on the iron strips preserve the grain pattern. The plates were fitted over the iron, thereby hiding it, and abutted at the centre of each strip. The joins were hidden by further pieces of horn that were cut to the width of the iron strips and placed on top. The three layers—iron at the bottom, followed by two layers of horn—were held together by a succession of rivets: iron rivets placed from inside the helmet, and rivets made of, or coated in, silver, with ornamental heads in the shape of a double-headed axe, placed from the outside, 4 cm (1.6 in) apart. Traces of horn on the rear extension of the nose-to-nape band, and on the rear brow band, suggest that the material was also used for a neck guard. These suggest that pieces of horn, extending 5 cm (2.0 in) from the centre of the brow band to the bottom of the rear nose-to-nape band, would have met each extension of the lateral band at a 5° angle, reaching them 6.4 cm (2.5 in) from the centre of the brow band.

In addition to the aesthetic elements incorporated into the basic construction of the helmet, two features provide added decoration: a cross on the nasal and a boar on the crest. The silver cross is 3.9 cm (1.5 in) long by 2 cm (0.8 in) wide, and consists of two parts. A silver strip was added underneath, elongating what was originally an equal-armed cross. It was placed atop a layer of horn and attached to the helmet with two rivets, one at the intersection of the two arms and one at the bottom. Around the cross in a zigzag pattern are twenty-nine silver studs, out of a suggested original forty, that were probably tapped into small holes drilled into the horn.

The most distinctive feature of the Benty Grange helmet is its boar, affixed to the apex of the helmet. The core of its body is made of two pieces of hollow D-sectioned bronze tubes, their flat sides approximately 2 mm (0.08 in) apart. The space between the two halves was filled in with a substance, likely horn or metal, which has now disintegrated; it perhaps projected upwards, forming the mane or spine of the boar, or, as has been interpreted on the replica, created a recess into which a mane of actual boar bristles could fit. On either side of the bronze core was affixed a plate of iron, forming the visible exterior of the boar. Four pear-shaped plates of gilded silver—cut down and filed from Roman silver, as evidenced by a classical leaf design on the reverse of the front left plate, and file marks on the obverse—acted as hips, through which passed two silver rivets, one atop the other, per end. These rivets held together the five layers of the boar, and were welded to the plates. Into the body of the boar were placed holes, probably punched, that held circular silver studs approximately 1.5 mm (0.06 in) in diameter. The studs, likely flush with the surface of the body, were filed down and gilded, and may have been intended to represent golden bristles. Eyes were formed with 5 mm (0.20 in) long pointed oval garnets set into gold sockets with filigree wire edging. The sockets were 8 mm (0.31 in) long by 3.5 mm (0.14 in) wide, and had 8 mm (0.31 in) long shanks, filled with beeswax, sunk into the head. Individual pieces of gilded bronze seem to have formed the tail, tusks, muzzle, jawline, and ears of the boar, but few traces of them now remain. Two sets of iron legs—probably solid originally, but rendered hollow by corrosion—attached the body to an elliptical bronze plate; both sets depict front legs, bent forwards without account for the anatomical differences between a boar's fore and hind limbs. The elliptical plate is 9 cm (3.5 in) long with a maximum width of 1.9 cm (0.75 in), and matches the curvature of the helmet. Four holes indicate attachment points for the legs and another three connected the plate to the frame of the helmet, in addition to a large rivet hole slightly behind the centre. The plate was probably affixed directly to the frame, the legs passing through holes in the horn.

== Function ==
The Benty Grange helmet would have both offered some protection if worn in battle, and indicated its wearer's status. As the Weston Park replica shows, it would have originally been an impressive object, and may have been intended for ceremonial use. Experiments using a mockup of the replica also showed that the helmet would have resisted blows with an axe, which damaged the horn without entirely breaking it. Arrows and spears pierced the horn, but they also pierced modern fibreglass and safety helmets.

Helmets were rare in Anglo-Saxon England, and the Benty Grange helmet, both by its richness and its scarcity, signified the high status of its owner. Such protection certainly seems to have been among the armour of the affluent. In the contemporary epic Beowulf, a poem about kings and nobles, they are relatively common, while the helmeted Vendel and Valsgärde graves from the same period in Sweden, thought to be the burials of wealthy non-royals, suggest that helmets were not solely for the use of the élite. Yet thousands of furnished Anglo-Saxon graves have been excavated since the start of the 19th century and helmets remain rare; this may partly reflect poor rates of artefact survival or even recognition, but their extreme scarcity indicates that they were never deposited in great numbers.

== Discovery ==
=== Location ===
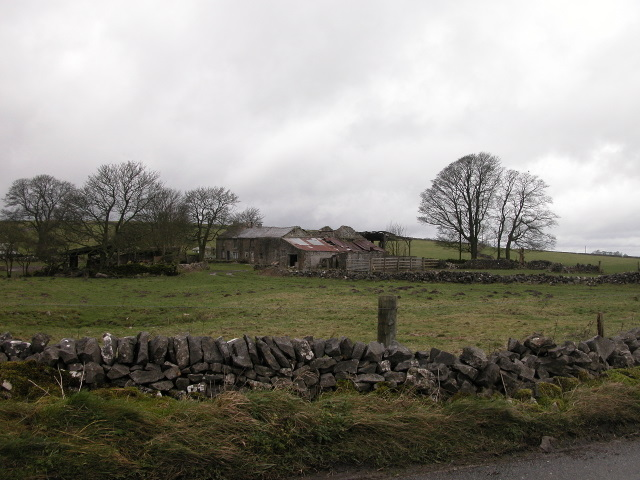
Benty Grange Farm, near Monyash in the Derbyshire Dales

The helmet was discovered in a barrow on the Benty Grange farm in Derbyshire, in what is now the Peak District National Park. Thomas Bateman, an archaeologist and antiquarian who led the excavation, (Note: Bateman excavated more than 500 barrows in his lifetime, earning him the moniker "The Barrow Knight.") described Benty Grange as "a high and bleak situation"; its barrow, which still survives, is prominently located by a major Roman road, now roughly parallel to the A515 in the area, possibly to display the burial to passing travellers. The barrow is one of several tumuli in the vicinity, and may have also been designed to share the skyline with two other nearby monuments, Arbor Low stone circle and Gib Hill barrow.

The 7th-century Peak District was a small buffer province between Mercia and Northumbria, occupied, according to the Tribal Hidage, by the Anglo-Saxon Pecsæte. (Note: The Tribal Hidage is a list of territories south of the Humber, sized by hides, which were used as a measure of taxation. Though the list has been variously dated between the mid-seventh and the late eighth centuries, it may mix earlier and later calculations, and include information from as late as the tenth century; it survives in several manuscripts, the latest of which dates to around the eleventh century.) The area came under the control of the Mercian kingdom around the 8th century; the Benty Grange and other rich barrows suggest that the Pecsæte may have had their own dynasty beforehand, but there is no written evidence for this.

=== Excavation ===
Bateman excavated the barrow on 3 May 1848. Although he did not mention it in his account, he was probably not the first person to dig up the grave. The fact that the objects were found in two clusters 6 feet (1.8 m) apart, and that other objects that normally accompany a helmet, such as a sword and shield, were absent, suggests that the grave had previously been looted. Given the size of the mound, an alternative (or additional) explanation is that it originally contained two burials, only one of which Bateman discovered. (Note: Llewellynn Jewitt suggested in 1870 that there had been two burials, writing that "In this mound, although a curious and unique helmet, the silver mountings of a leather drinking-cup, some highly interesting and beautiful enamelled ornaments, and other objects, as well as indications of the garments, remained, not a vestige of the body, with the exception of some of the hair, was to be seen. The lovely and delicate form of the female and the form of the stalwart warrior or noble had alike returned to their parent earth, leaving no trace behind, save the enamel of her teeth and traces of his hair alone, while the ornaments they wore and took pride in, and the surroundings of their stations, remained to tell their tale at this distant date.")

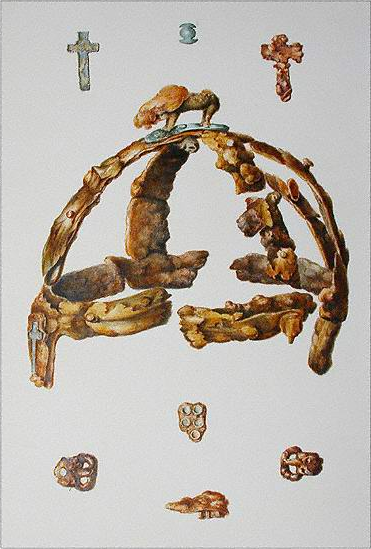
Watercolour by Llewellynn Jewitt depicting the Benty Grange helmet and associated finds

The barrow comprises a circular central mound approximately 15 m (50 ft) in diameter and 0.6 m (2 ft) high, an encircling fosse about 1 m (3.3 ft) wide and 0.3 m (1 ft) deep, and outer penannular earthworks around 3 m (10 ft) wide and 0.2 m (0.66 ft) high. The entire structure measures approximately 23 by 22 m (75 by 72 ft). Bateman suggested a body once lay at its centre, flat against the original surface of the soil; what he described as the one remnant, strands of hair, is now thought to be from a cloak of fur, cowhide or something similar. The recovered objects were found in two clusters. One cluster was found in the area of the supposed hair, the other about 6 ft (1.8 m) to the west. In the former area Bateman described "a curious assemblage of ornaments", which were difficult to remove successfully from the hardened earth. This included a cup identified as leather but probably of wood, approximately 3 in (7.6 cm) in diameter at the mouth. Its rim was edged with silver, while its surface was "decorated by four wheel-shaped ornaments and two crosses of thin silver, affixed by pins of the same metal, clenched inside". Also found were the remnants of three hanging bowl escutcheons, as well as "a knot of very fine wire", and some "thin bone variously ornamented with lozenges &c." attached to silk, but that soon decayed when exposed to air.

Approximately 6 ft (1.8 m) to the west of the other objects was found a jumbled mass of ironwork. Separated, this mass included a collection of chainwork, a six-pronged piece of iron resembling a hayfork, and the helmet. As Bateman described it:

The helmet has been formed of ribs of iron radiating from the crown of the head, and covered with narrow plates of horn, running in a diagonal direction from the ribs, so as to form a herring-bone pattern; the ends were secured by strips of horn, radiating in like manner as the iron ribs, to which they were riveted at intervals of about an inch and a-half: all the rivets had ornamented heads of silver on the outside, and on the front rib is a small cross of the same metal. Upon the top, or crown of the helmet, is an elongated oval brass plate, upon which stands the figure of an animal, carved in iron, now very much rusted, but still a very good representation of a pig: it has bronze eyes. There are also many smaller decorations, abounding in rivets, which have pertained to the helmet, but which it is impossible to assign to their proper places, as is also the case with some small iron buckles.

Bateman closed his 1849 account of the excavation by noting the "particularly corrosive nature of the soil", which by 1861 he said "has generally been the case in tumuli in Derbyshire". He suggested that this was the result of "a mixing or tempering with some corrosive liquid; the result of which is the presence of thin ochrey veins in the earth, and the decomposition of nearly the whole of the human remains." Bateman's friend Llewellynn Jewitt, an artist and antiquarian who frequently accompanied Bateman on excavations, painted four watercolours of the finds, parts of which were included in Bateman's 1849 account. (Note: Like the helmet, the four watercolours are now in the collection of the Weston Park Museum.) This was more than Jewitt produced for any other of their excavations, a mark of the importance that they assigned to the Benty Grange barrow.

The helmet entered Bateman's extensive collection, where it attracted interest. On 27 October 1848 he reported his discoveries, including the helmet, cup, and hanging bowl, at a meeting of the British Archaeological Association, and in 1855 it was catalogued along with other objects from the Benty Grange barrow. In 1861 Bateman died at age 39, and in 1876 his son, Thomas W. Bateman, loaned the objects to Sheffield. They were displayed at the Weston Park Museum through 1893, at which time the museum purchased objects, including the helmet, from the family; other pieces were dispersed elsewhere. As of 2024, the helmet remains in the collection of the museum. From 8 November 1991 to 8 March 1992 it joined the Coppergate helmet at the British Museum for The Making of England: Anglo-Saxon Art and Culture, AD 600–900.

The Benty Grange barrow was designated a scheduled monument on 23 October 1970. The list entry notes that "[a]lthough the centre of Benty Grange [barrow] has been partially disturbed by excavation, the monument is otherwise undisturbed and retains significant archaeological remains." It goes on to note that further excavation would yield new information. The surrounding fields were designated a Site of Special Scientific Interest in 2013, and see agricultural use. The nearby farmhouse was renovated between 2012 and 2014; as of 2023 is used as a holiday cottage.

=== Conservation ===
In 1948, the helmet was brought to the British Museum to undergo cleaning and study. Permission to carry out the work had been requested the previous year, when Rupert Bruce-Mitford, recently returned from World War II service in the Royal Signals to an assistant keepership at the museum, spent time in Sheffield examining the Benty Grange grave goods. A 1940 letter from T. D. Kendrick to Bruce-Mitford's army camp had assigned him his position, and responsibility for the Sutton Hoo discoveries—"Brace yourself for the task", the letter concluded. Upon his return, he therefore took to studying the comparison material; his work in 1947 included the excavation of the Valsgärde 11 boat-grave in Sweden alongside Sune Lindqvist, and the trip to Sheffield, intended to shed light on the Sutton Hoo helmet through comparison with the only other Anglo-Saxon helmet then known. Permission was obtained from the curator and trustees of the Weston Park Museum for the proposed work, and, by February 1948—when, shortly before the centennial of its excavation, Bruce-Mitford exhibited it to the Society of Antiquaries of London—the Benty Grange helmet was brought to London.

Work at the British Museum was overseen by keeper of the research laboratory Harold Plenderleith, who in some cases, particularly with the boar, did the work himself; additional input was provided by Bruce-Mitford, the technical attaché and authority on ancient metalwork Herbert Maryon, and the archaeologist and art historian Françoise Henry. In the hundred years following its exposure to the air the helmet had continued to corrode, and certain parts had become indiscernible. The boar was unrecognizable, and the silver rivets and cross were almost completely obscured. A strong needle was used to pick off the encrustation, revealing the underlying features. During this process, the boar, hitherto thought solid, snapped in two. Bruce-Mitford termed this occurrence "fortunate", for it revealed the boar's inner structure. Frederic Charles Fraser examined the remnants of horn at the Natural History Museum, and conducted experiments softening and shaping modern horn.

== Typology ==
The Benty Grange helmet is dated to the first half of the 7th century AD, on the basis of its technical construction and decorative style. It is one of six Anglo-Saxon helmets, joined by the subsequent discoveries from Sutton Hoo, York, Wollaston, Shorwell, and Staffordshire. These are all, other than the Frankish Shorwell helmet, examples of the "crested helmets" known in Northern Europe in the 6th through 11th centuries AD. Such helmets are characterized by prominent crests and rounded caps, traits shared by the Benty Grange example, and other than a Viking Age fragment found in Kiev, uniformly originate from England or Scandinavia; contemporary continental helmets were primarily spangenhelm or lamellenhelm.

The ultimate form of the helmet is unparalleled among surviving Anglo-Saxon and crested helmets, although individual characteristics are shared. While other Anglo-Saxon helmets were typically formed with wide perpendicular bands and four infill plates, (Note: This is true of the helmets from York, Wollaston, and Shorwell. The exception, besides the Benty Grange helmet, is the Sutton Hoo helmet, which appears to have had its cap raised from a single piece of iron. The Staffordshire helmet is still undergoing conservation work and research.) their Swedish counterparts from Vendel and Valsgärde display similar use of thin iron frameworks. The complicated construction of the Benty Grange boar, which combines garnet, filigree, gold, silver, iron, and bronze, is unique across ornamental Anglo-Saxon objects, but the general boar-crest is paralleled by the Wollaston and Guilden Morden boars. One other helmet exhibits the use of horn, but it is the spangenhelm-type helmet of a high-status child, discovered in Cologne.

== Iconography ==
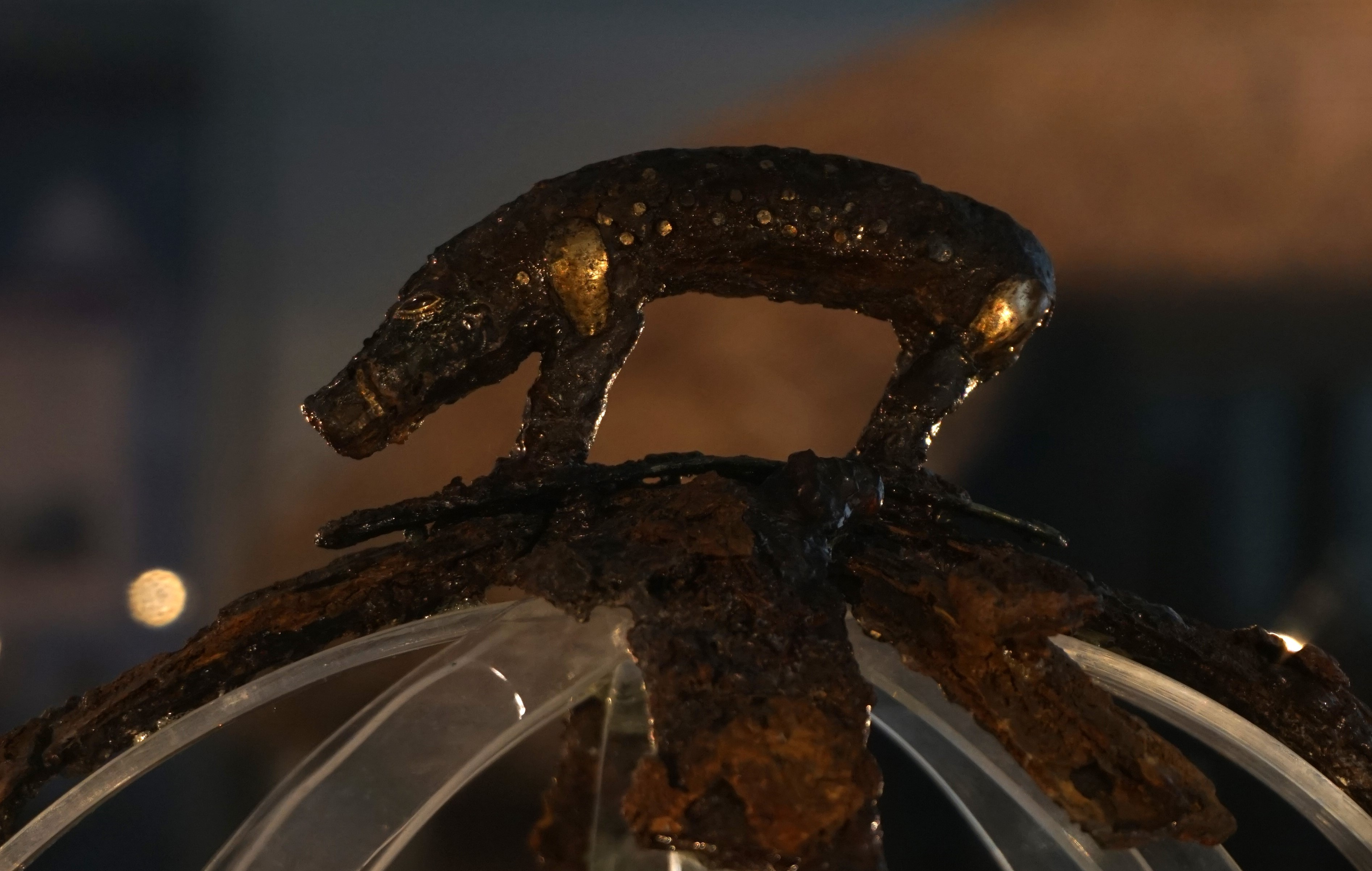
Close-up of the boar crest

The helmet was made during the nascent days of Christianity in Anglo-Saxon England, and exhibits both Christian and pagan motifs. The boar invoked a pagan tradition and the cross a Christian belief.

Roman Britain had been officially converted to Christianity in the 4th century, although Celtic paganism remained strong. In the 5th century Ireland was converted by British missionaries and in 563 Irish missionaries based in the monastery of Iona off the western coast of Scotland embarked on the conversion of the Picts. Christianity almost disappeared in southern Britain after its conquest by the pagan Anglo-Saxons in the 5th and 6th centuries, apart from the surviving Celtic areas of southwest England and Wales. In 597 Pope Gregory the Great sent the Gregorian mission to Kent to embark on the conversion of the Anglo-Saxons. It rapidly converted kingdoms as far north as Northumbria, but initial success was often followed by a period of apostasy and in several cases the final conversion was carried out by Irish missionaries from Iona. It is not known whether the Pecsæte were converted by adherents of the Roman or Irish Celtic tradition.

The Benty Grange helmet was made during this time of change, as evidenced by its syncretic display. It emphasises the pagan element, a large boar dominating a small cross. The cross may not necessarily be an indication of Christian belief; it may have instead been chosen for its amuletic effect. Whatever the politics behind religious conversion, the battlefield was not a place to discriminate against gods.

=== The boar ===
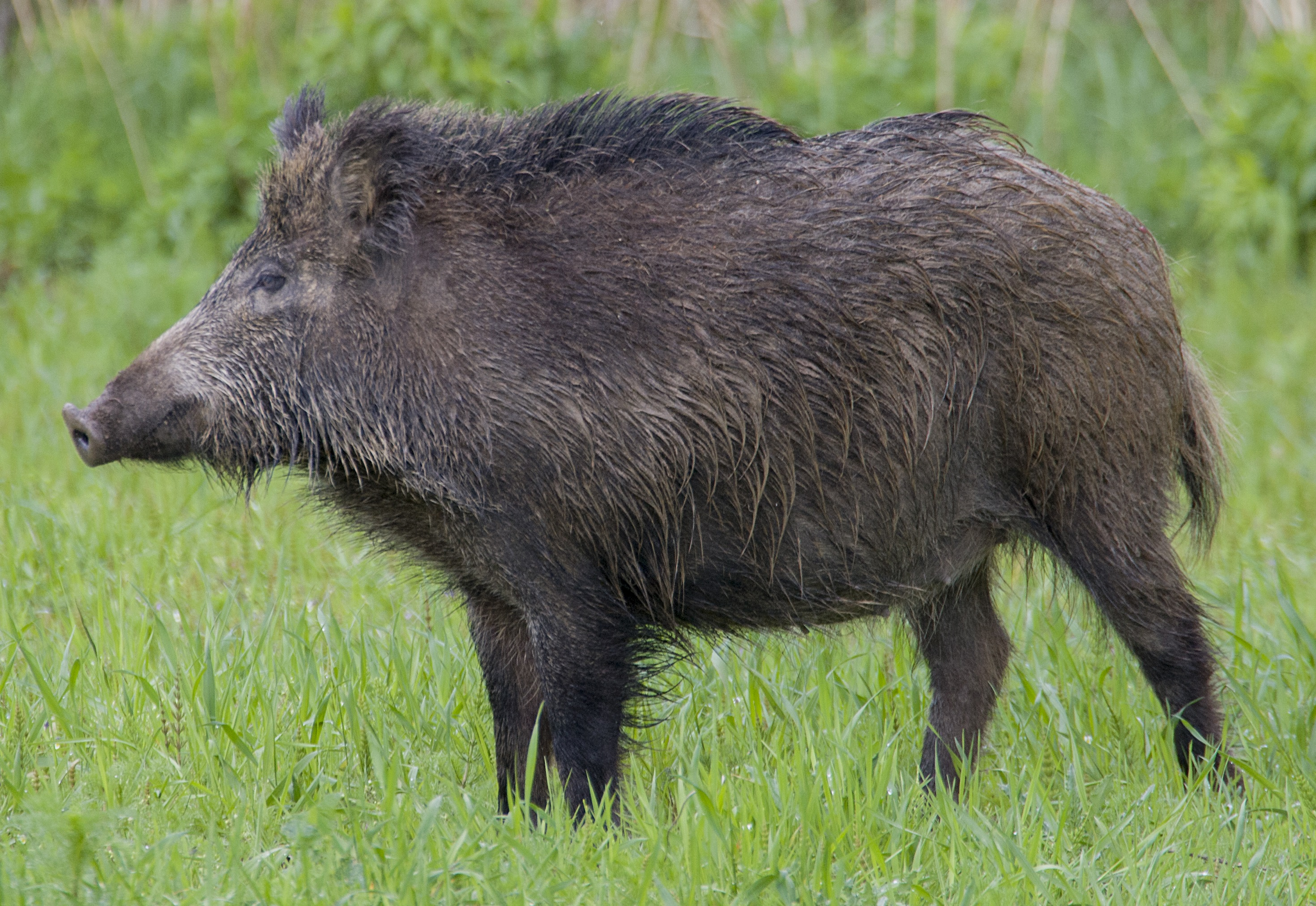
A Central European boar

The boar had symbolic import in prehistoric Europe, where, according to the archaeologist Jennifer Foster, it was "venerated, eulogised, hunted and eaten ... for millennia, until its virtual extinction in recent historical time." Anglo-Saxon boar symbols follow a thousand years of similar iconography, coming after La Tène examples in the 4th century BC, Gaulish specimens three centuries later, and Roman boars in the 4th century AD. They likely represent a fused tradition of European and Mediterranean cultures. The boar is said to have been sacred to a mother goddess figure among linguistically Celtic communities in Iron Age Europe, while the Roman historian Tacitus, writing around the 1st century AD, suggested that the Baltic Aesti wore boar symbols in battle to invoke her protection.

Boar-crested helmets are depicted on the turn-of-the-millennium Gundestrup cauldron, discovered in Denmark, and on a Torslunda plate from Sweden, made 500 years later. The Romans also included the boar as one of their many symbols—four legions, including the twentieth, adopted it as their emblem. The boar persisted in continental Germanic tradition during the nearly 400 years of Roman rule in Britain, such as in association with the Scandinavian gods Freyja and Freyr. Its return to prominence in the Anglo-Saxon period, as represented by the boars from Benty Grange, Wollaston, Guilden Morden, and Horncastle, may therefore suggest the post-Roman reintroduction of a Germanic tradition from Europe, rather than the continuation of a tradition in Britain through 400 years of Roman rule. Whatever its precise symbolism, the Anglo-Saxon boar appears to have been associated with protection; the Beowulf poet makes this clear, writing that boar symbols on helmets kept watch over the warriors wearing them.

=== Boar-crests in Beowulf ===
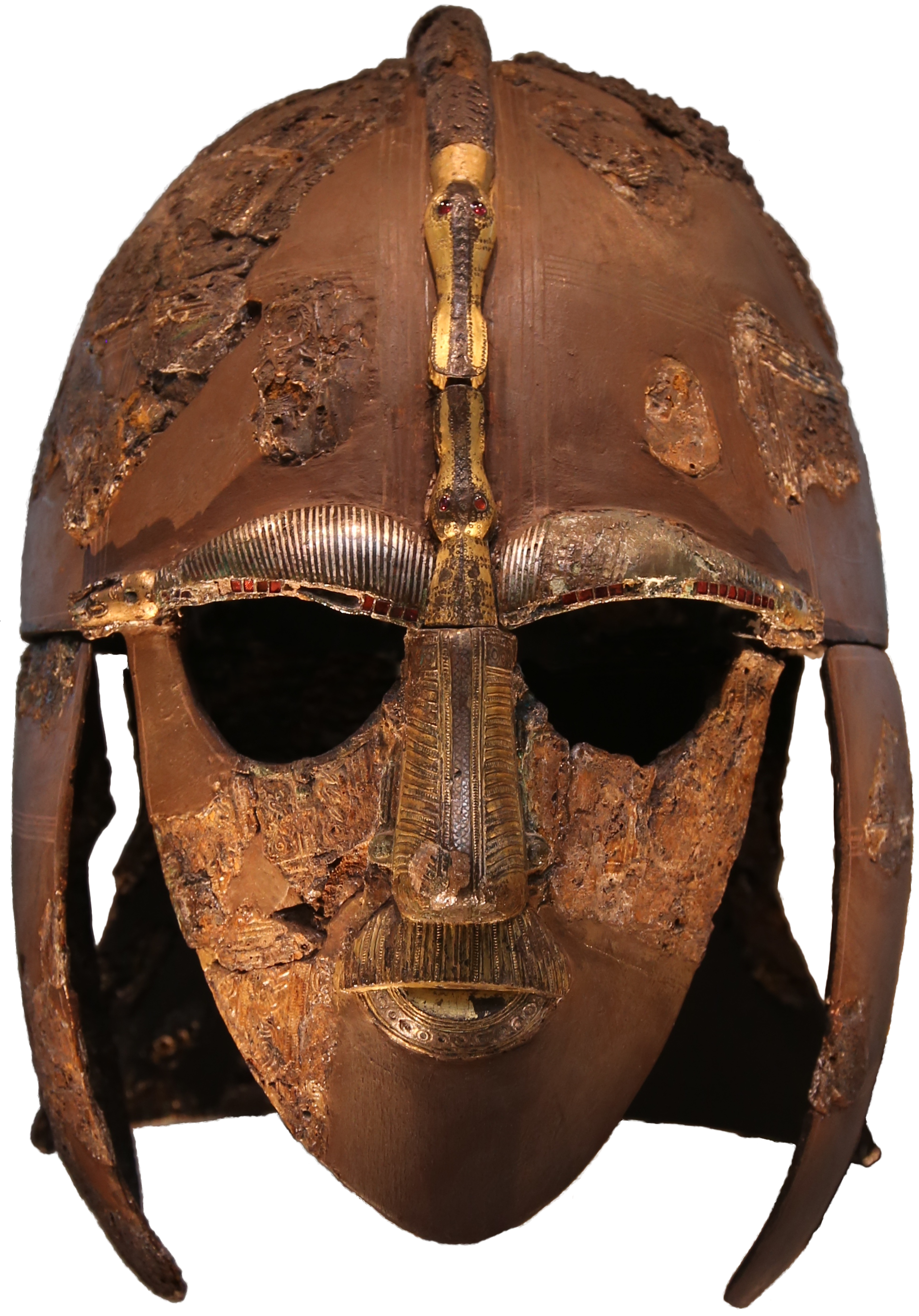
The Sutton Hoo helmet exhibits the other style of boar motif mentioned in Beowulf.

The Benty Grange helmet recalls the Anglo-Saxon poem Beowulf, in which boar-adorned helmets are mentioned five times. Three passages appear to describe examples that, like the Benty Grange helmet, are topped with a freestanding boar. (Note: In the other two instances boars are referred to in the plural, such as when Beowulf and his men leave their ship as "[b]oar-shapes flashed above their cheek-guards" (eoforlic scionon ofer hleorbergan). These references were perhaps made with the intention of recalling boars like those on the eyebrows of the Sutton Hoo helmet.) After Æschere is killed by Grendel's mother, King Hrothgar's lamentation speaks of such helmets.

"Ne frin þu æfter sælum! Sorh is geniwod
Denigea leodum. Dead is Æschere,
Yrmenlafes yldra broþor,
min runwita ond min rædbora,
eaxlgestealla, ðonne we on orlege
hafelan weredon, þonne hniton feþan,
eoferas cnysedan. Swylc scolde eorl wesan.
æþeling ærgod, swylc Æschere wæs!"

—Old English text
Translation:

"Rest? What is rest? Sorrow has returned.
Alas for the Danes! Æschere is dead.
He was Yrmenlaf's elder brother
and a soul-mate to me, a true mentor,
my right-hand man when the ranks clashed
and our boar-crests had to take a battering
in the line of action. Æschere was everything
the world admires in a wise man and a friend."

—English translation

The devastation wrought by Grendel's mother itself invokes a boar-crested helmet, for "[h]er onslaught was less only by as much as an amazon warrior's strength is less than an armed man's when the hefted sword, its hammered edge and gleaming blade slathered in blood, razed the sturdy boar-ridge off a helmet" (Wæs se gryre læssa efne swa micle, swa bið mægþa cræft, wiggryre wifes be wæpnedmen, þonne heoru bunden, hamere geþruen, sweord swate fah swin ofer helme ecgum dyhtig andweard scireð.) These two passages likely refer to boar-crests like those found on the Benty Grange and Wollaston helmets, and the detached Guilden Morden boar.

== Bibliography ==
- Allen, John Romilly (1898). "Metal Bowls of the Late-Celtic and Anglo-Saxon Periods". Archaeologia. LVI: 39–56. doi:10.1017/s0261340900003842.
- "Anglo-Saxon Antiquities". The Times. No. 20, 007. London. 30 October 1948. p. 4 – via Newspapers.com.
- "Anglo-Saxon Antiquities". The Morning Post. No. 23, 370. London. 1 November 1848. p. 2 – via Newspapers.com.
- "Anglo-Saxon Antiquities". The Morning Post. No. 5, 713. Ipswich. 4 November 1848. p. 4 – via Newspapers.com.
- Bateman, Thomas (1849). "Description of the Contents of a Saxon Barrow". The Journal of the British Archaeological Association. IV (3): 276–279. doi:10.1080/00681288.1848.11886866.
- Bateman, Thomas (1855). A Descriptive Catalogue of the Antiquities and Miscellaneous Objects Preserved in the Museum of Thomas Bateman, at Lomberdale House, Derbyshire. Bakewell: James Gratton.
- Bateman, Thomas (1861). Ten Years' Digging in Celtic and Saxon Grave Hills, in the counties of Derby, Stafford, and York, from 1848 to 1858; with notices of some former discoveries, hitherto unpublished, and remarks on the crania and pottery from the mounds. London: John Russell Smith. pp. 28–33.
- Benty Grange [@BentyGrange] (22 August 2014). "We are proud to open the doors to Benty Grange to our first guests. We couldn't have done it without @PeakVenues . THANKS" (Tweet) – via Twitter.
- "Benty Grange – Barn Conversion – Peak Venues". Peak Venues.
- "Benty Grange Helmet: Continuing Display, Weston Park Museum". Museums Sheffield. Archived from the original on 20 May 2024.
- "Benty Grange SSSI". Designated Sites. Natural England.
- Beowulf. n.d.

- Old English quotations above use the Klaeber text, published as Klaeber, Friedrich (1922). Beowulf and The Fight at Finnsburg. Boston: D.C. Heath & Company.

- Biddle, Martin (3 December 2015). "Rupert Leo Scott Bruce-Mitford: 1914–1994" (PDF). Biographical Memoirs of Fellows of the British Academy. XIV: 58–86.
- Blair, John (2014). "The Tribal Hidage". In Lapidge, Michael; Blair, John; Keynes, Simon & Scragg, Donald (eds.). The Wiley Blackwell Encyclopedia of Anglo-Saxon England (2nd ed.). Chichester: Blackwell Publishing. pp. 473–475. doi:10.1002/9781118316061.ch20. ISBN 978-0-470-65632-7.
- "Boar from replica Benty Grange helmet". I Dig Sheffield. Museums Sheffield.
- "The boar on the replica Benty Grange helmet". I Dig Sheffield. Museums Sheffield.
- "Boat Graves in Sweden". The Archaeological News Letter. 1 (5): 4, 7. August–September 1948. OCLC 804496158.
- Bowring, Joanna (2012). Turquet, Josephine (ed.). Chronology of Temporary Exhibitions at the British Museum (PDF). British Museum Research Publications. Vol. 189. London: The British Museum. ISBN 978-0-86159-189-3.
- Brown, Antony (October 2017). "Dowlow Quarry ROMP Environmental Statement Appendix 10.2: Setting Assessment" (PDF). ARS Ltd Reports. 2017 (82).
- Bruce-Mitford, Rupert (1956). "The Benty Grange Helmet". Annual Report for the Year Ending 31st March 1956. Sheffield: Sheffield City Museum. pp. 13–15. OCLC 694999446.
- Bruce-Mitford, Rupert (Autumn 1972). "The Sutton Hoo Helmet: A New Reconstruction". The British Museum Quarterly. XXXVI (3–4): 120–130. doi:10.2307/4423116. JSTOR 4423116.
- Bruce-Mitford, Rupert (1974). Aspects of Anglo-Saxon Archaeology: Sutton Hoo and Other Discoveries. London: Victor Gollancz Limited. ISBN 0-575-01704-X.
- Bruce-Mitford, Rupert (1978). The Sutton Hoo Ship-Burial, Volume 2: Arms, Armour and Regalia. London: British Museum Publications. ISBN 978-0-7141-1331-9.
- Bruce-Mitford, Rupert (1989a). "Early Thoughts on Sutton Hoo" (PDF). Saxon (10).
- Bruce-Mitford, Rupert (1989b). Anglo-Saxon and Mediaeval Archaeology, History and Art, with special reference to Sutton Hoo: The highly important Working Library and Archive of more than 6,000 titles formed by Dr. Rupert L.S. Bruce-Mitford FBA, D.Litt., FSA. Wickmere: Merrion Book Co. OCLC 858531182.
  - Includes prefatory essays My Japanese Background and Forty Years with Sutton Hoo by Bruce-Mitford. The latter was republished in Carver 2004, pp. 23–28.
- Butterworth, Jenni; Fregni, Giovanna; Fuller, Kayleigh & Greaves, Pieta (2016). "The Importance of Multidisciplinary Work Within Archaeological Conservation Projects: Assembly of the Staffordshire Hoard Die-Impressed Sheets". Journal of the Institute of Conservation. 39 (1): 29–43. doi:10.1080/19455224.2016.1155071.
- Carver, Martin (2004). "Before 1983" (PDF). Sutton Hoo Field Reports (Data Set). 2. doi:10.5284/1000266.
- Chaney, William A. (1970). The Cult of Kingship in Anglo-Saxon England: The Transition from Paganism to Christianity. Manchester: Manchester University Press. OCLC 963628882.
- Charles-Edwards, Thomas (2003). After Rome. Oxford, UK: Oxford University Press. ISBN 978-0-19-924982-4.
- Clutton-Brock, Juliet (1999). A Natural History of Domesticated Mammals (2nd ed.). Cambridge: Cambridge University Press. ISBN 978-0-521-63247-8.
- Cramp, Rosemary J. (1957). "Beowulf and Archaeology" (PDF). Medieval Archaeology (Data Set). 1: 57–77. doi:10.1080/00766097.1957.11735382.
- Davidson, Hilda Ellis (1968). "Archaeology and Beowulf". In Garmonsway, George Norman & Simpson, Jacqueline (eds.). Beowulf and its Analogues. London: J. M. Dent & Sons. pp. 350–360. OCLC 421931242.
- Foster, Jennifer (1977a). "Notes and News: A Boar Figurine from Guilden Morden, Cambs" (PDF). Medieval Archaeology (Data Set). XXI: 166–167. doi:10.5284/1000320.
  - Images on plate XIV
- Foster, Jennifer (1977b). "Bronze Boar Figurines in Iron Age and Roman Britain". British Archaeological Reports. 39. ISBN 978-0-904531-74-9.
- Frank, Roberta (2008). "The Boar on the Helmet". In Karkov, Catherine E. & Damico, Helen (eds.). Aedificia Nova: Studies in Honor of Rosemary Cramp. Publications of the Richard Rawlinson Center. Kalamazoo: Medieval Institute Publications, Western Michigan University. pp. 76–88. ISBN 978-1-58044-110-0.
- Goss, William Henry (1889). The Life and Death of Llewellynn Jewitt, F.S.A., Etc., with Fragmentary Memoirs of Some of his Famous Literary and Artistic Friends, Especially of Samuel Carter Hall, F.S.A., Etc. London: Henry Gray.
- Hatto, Arthur Thomas (August 1957a). "Snake-swords and Boar-helmets in Beowulf". English Studies. XXXVIII (4): 145–160. doi:10.1080/00138385708596994.
- Hatto, Arthur Thomas (December 1957b). "Notes and News: Snake-swords and Boar-helmets". English Studies. XXXVIII (6): 257–259. doi:10.1080/00138385708597004.
- Heaney, Seamus (2000). Beowulf: A New Verse Translation. New York: W. W. Norton. ISBN 978-0-393-32097-8.
- "Helmet from Benty Grange". I Dig Sheffield. Museums Sheffield.
- Historic England. "Benty Grange hlaew, Monyash (1013767)". National Heritage List for England.
- Hood, Jamie; Ager, Barry; Williams, Craig; Harrington, Susan & Cartwright, Caroline (2012). "Investigating and Interpreting an Early-to-Mid Sixth-Century Frankish Style Helmet" (PDF). The British Museum Technical Research Bulletin. 6. British Museum: 83–95. ISBN 978-1-904982-80-7.
- "Horn bands on replica Benty Grange helmet". I Dig Sheffield. Museums Sheffield.
- "Horn plates from the replica Benty Grange helmet". I Dig Sheffield. Museums Sheffield.
- Howarth, Elijah (1899). Catalogue of the Bateman Collection of Antiquities in the Sheffield Public Museum. London: Dulau and Co.
- Jewitt, Llewellynn (1870). Grave-mounds and their Contents: A Manual of Archæology, as Exemplified in the Burials of the Celtic, the Romano-British, and the Anglo-Saxon Periods. London: Groombridge and Sons.
- Keynes, Simon (2014). "Mercia". In Lapidge, Michael; Blair, John; Keynes, Simon & Scragg, Donald (eds.). The Wiley Blackwell Encyclopedia of Anglo-Saxon England (2nd ed.). Chichester: Blackwell Publishing. pp. 311–313. doi:10.1002/9781118316061.ch13. ISBN 978-0-470-65632-7.
- Kirby, David Peter (1991). "The Tribal Hidage". The Earliest English Kings. London: Unwin Hyman. pp. 9–12. ISBN 0-04-445691-3.
- Lester, Geoff (Fall 1987). "The Anglo-Saxon Helmet from Benty Grange, Derbyshire" (PDF). Old English Newsletter. 21 (1): 34–35. ISSN 0030-1973.
- Mayr-Harting, Henry (1991). The Coming of Christianity to Anglo-Saxon England (3rd ed.). University Park: Pennsylvania State University Press. ISBN 978-0-271-00769-4.
- Meadows, Ian (March 2004). "An Anglian Warrior Burial from Wollaston, Northamptonshire". Northamptonshire Archaeology Reports. 10 (110) (2010 digital ed.).
- Ozanne, Audrey (1962–1963). "The Peak Dwellers" (PDF). Medieval Archaeology. 6–7: 15–52. doi:10.1080/00766097.1962.11735659.
- "Proceedings of the Society of Antiquaries". The Antiquaries Journal. XXVIII (3–4). London: Society of Antiquaries of London: 221–228. July–October 1958. doi:10.1017/S0003581500017212. S2CID 246041487.
- "Replica Benty Grange helmet in use". I Dig Sheffield. Museums Sheffield.
- "Replica of the helmet from Benty Grange". I Dig Sheffield. Museums Sheffield.
- "Site record MDR11318 – Roman Road ('The Street') (conjectural route of), Buxton to Derby, High Peak and Derbyshire Dales". Derbyshire Historic Environment Record. Derbyshire County Council. 27 September 2023.
- Smith, Charles Roach (1852). "Anglo-Saxon and Frankish Remains". Collectanea Antiqua. II: 203–248.
- Smith, Reginald Allender (1908). "Thursday, 6th February, 1908". Proceedings of the Society of Antiquaries of London. 2nd series. XXII. London: Society of Antiquaries of London: 63–86. doi:10.1017/S0950797300002158.
- Speake, George (1980). Anglo-Saxon Animal Art. Oxford: Clarendon Press. ISBN 0-19-813194-1. LCCN 79-41091.
- Steuer, Heiko (1987). "Helm und Ringschwert: Prunkbewaffnung und Rangabzeichen germanischer Krieger" [Helmet and Ring-Sword: Ornamental Weapons and Insignia of Germanic Warriors]. In Häßler, Hans-Jürgen (ed.). Studien zur Sachsenforschung [Studies in Saxon Research] (in German). Vol. 6. Hildesheim: Lax. pp. 189–236. ISBN 3-7848-1617-7.
- Stjerna, Knut (1912). Essays on Questions Connected with the Old English Poem of Beowulf. Extra Series. Vol. III. Translated by Hall, John Richard Clark. London: Viking Club: Society for Northern Research.
- Tacitus (1868). "Germany and its Tribes". The Agricola and Germania of Tacitus. Translated by Church, Alfred John & Brodribb, William Jackson. London: Macmillan. ISBN 978-1-02-237238-2.
- Tacitus (1886). "Germania". In Church, Alfred John & Brodribb, William Jackson (eds.). The Agricola and Germania of Tacitus: With a Revised Text, English Notes, and Maps. London: Macmillan.
- Tweddle, Dominic (1992). The Anglian Helmet from 16–22 Coppergate. The Archaeology of York. Vol. 17/8. London: Council for British Archaeology. ISBN 1-872414-19-2. Archived from the original on 21 March 2024.
- "Watercolour of finds from Benty Grange including escutcheon and cup fittings". I Dig Sheffield. Museums Sheffield.
- "Watercolour showing fragments of metal chainwork". I Dig Sheffield. Museums Sheffield.
- "Watercolour showing fragments of metal chainwork". I Dig Sheffield. Museums Sheffield.
- "Watercolour showing the helmet from Benty Grange". I Dig Sheffield. Museums Sheffield.
- Way, Albert (1855). "Notice of a Bronze Relique, Assigned to the Later Roman or the Saxon Age, Discovered at Leckhampton, Gloucestershire". The Archaeological Journal. XII: 7–21.
- Webster, Leslie & Backhouse, Janet, eds. (1991). The Making of England: Anglo-Saxon Art and Culture, AD 600–900. Toronto: University of Toronto Press. ISBN 978-0-8020-7721-9.
- "Weekly List of Applications Validated by the Authority: Applications validated between 18/072012 – 24/07/2012" (PDF). Peak District National Park Authority.
- Wood, Ian (2014). "Conversion". In Lapidge, Michael; Blair, John; Keynes, Simon; Scragg, Donald (eds.). The Wiley Blackwell Encyclopedia of Anglo-Saxon England (Second ed.). Chichester, UK: Blackwell Publishing. pp. 123–124. ISBN 978-0-470-65632-7.
- Yorke, Barbara (1990). Kings and Kingdoms of Early Anglo-Saxon England. London: Routledge. ISBN 0-415-16639-X.

- Republished as an ebook as Yorke, Barbara (2003) [1990]. Kings and Kingdoms of Early Anglo-Saxon England (PDF). London: Routledge. ISBN 0-203-44730-1.
