= Damico =

Damico is a surname. Notable people with the surname include:

- Helen Damico (1931–2020), American literature scholar
- Kellen Damico (born 1989), American tennis player
