= Listed buildings in Monyash =

Monyash is a civil parish in the Derbyshire Dales district of Derbyshire, England. The parish contains 17 listed buildings that are recorded in the National Heritage List for England. Of these, one is listed at Grade II*, the middle of the three grades, and the others are at Grade II, the lowest grade. The parish contains the village of Monyash and the surrounding countryside. Most of the listed buildings are houses, cottages and associated structures, farmhouses and farm buildings. The other listed buildings include a church, a former chapel, a village cross, a public house, and a telephone kiosk.

== Key ==
Grade	Criteria
II*	Particularly important buildings of more than special interest
II	Buildings of national importance and special interest

== Buildings ==
Name and location	Photograph	Date	Notes	Grade
St Leonard's Church; 53.19515°N 1.77477°W		Early 13th century	The church has been altered and extended through the centuries, and was restored and extended in 1885–88 by William Butterfield. It is built in limestone with gritstone dressings, and has roofs mainly in stone slate, with some lead. The church consists of a nave with north and south aisles, a south porch, north and south transepts, a chancel and a west steeple. The steeple has a tower with three stages, buttresses, moulded string courses, a north clock face, a north gargoyle, an embattled parapet, and a recessed octagonal spire with two tiers of lucarnes.	II*
Village Cross; 53.19586°N 1.77701°W		Medieval	The oldest part of the cross is the base, with the shaft dating from later. The base consists of large limestone blocks with smaller square plinth. On this is a gritstone octagonal base, and a gritstone tapering shaft about 7 feet (2.1 m) high, with a small head.	II
The Bull's Head Public House; 53.19600°N 1.77662°W		1619	The public house, which was extended in the 18th century, is in limestone with quoins and tile roofs. The original part has two storeys and two bays, gritstone dressings, and a coped gable on the west. To the left is a blocked doorway with a quoined surround, a four-centred arched head, incised spandrels, and a dated lintel, to its right is a 19th-century doorway with a large lintel and a hood mould, and further to the right is a 20th-century doorway with a flat hood on brackets. The windows in this part are mullioned. The extension to the right has three storeys and two bays, and limestone dressings. The windows have chamfered surrounds, and those in the lower two floors have hoods.	II
Former Quaker Chapel; 53.19722°N 1.77701°W		c. 1711	The chapel was converted from a cottage, enlarged in the 19th century, and later used for other purposes. It is in limestone with dressings in limestone and gritstone and has a roof of stone slate and tile. There are two storeys and single-storey additions. The doorway has a large lintel, there is one tall sash window, and the other windows are mullioned. At the rear, the south front is open and carried on cast iron columns.	II
Manor House Farmhouse; 53.19332°N 1.77459°W		1714	The farmhouse, which was refronted in the 19th century, is in limestone with gritstone dressings, chamfered quoins, a moulded eaves cornice, and a tile roof with a coped north gable and a moulded kneeler. There are two storeys, a double pile plan and three bays. The central doorway has a moulded surround, an initialled and dated lintel, and a moulded hood on brackets. The windows are sashes with long-and-short surrounds and keystones. On the sides of the house are three-light mullioned windows.	II
Shuttle Hill Cottage; 53.19731°N 1.77693°W	—	1747	A pair of cottages with massive quoins and a slate roof. There are two storeys, and each cottage has two bays. The doorways in the centre have large lintels, most of the windows are mullioned, and some are inserted casements. Between the doorways is an initialled datestone.	II
One Ash Grange Farmhouse, cottage and barn 53.18388°N 1.74855°W	—	18th century	A farmhouse, cottage and barn under a continuous roof, they are in limestone with gritstone dressings, quoins, and a stone slate roof with coped gables and moulded kneelers on the west. There are two storeys with attics over the middle part, the house has six bays and the barn has two. Most of the windows are mullioned, and there are some sashes and casements, and a doorway with a segmental arched head. In the barn is a large segmental archway with a keystone.	II
Pigsties, One Ash Grange; 53.18411°N 1.74881°W		18th century	A row of pigsties in limestone with gritstone dressings and a stone slate roof. There is a single storey with four pens in front, enclosed by walls with slab copings. On the front are four gateways with feeding troughs between, consisting of twin niches with sloping stone slabs. Each sty has a low opening.	II
Sheldon House; 53.19782°N 1.77687°W		1774	A limestone house with quoins, string courses, and a stone slate roof. There are three storeys and two bays, the left bay projecting, with a porch in the angle. The windows are mullioned, and on the left bay is a square plaque with moulded edges inscribed with a circle and a date.	II
Ivy Cottage; 53.19572°N 1.77470°W		Late 18th century	A farmhouse, later a private house, in limestone with gritstone dressings, and a stone slate roof with moulded gable copings and kneelers. There are two storeys and four bays. The doorway has a large lintel and to its left is a single-light casement window. The other windows are mullioned with two casements, those in the ground floor with hood moulds.	II
Mere Farmhouse and outbuilding 53.19476°N 1.77742°W		Late 18th century	The farmhouse is in limestone with painted dressings and a tile roof. There are two storeys and two bays. The central doorway has a four-centred arch and a canopy, and the windows are mullioned with two lights. The outbuilding is attached to the south.	II
Townend Farmhouse; 53.19884°N 1.77694°W	—	Late 18th century	The farmhouse is in limestone with gritstone dressings, chamfered quoins, and a tile roof with coped gables and moulded kneelers. There are two storeys and four bays. The doorway has a chamfered quoined surround, and a lintel with incised voussoirs and a keystone. Over the doorway is a single-light window, and the other windows are mullioned with two lights.	II
Former Post Office, house and dairy 53.19583°N 1.77749°W		Early 19th century	A terrace of three cottages in limestone with limestone dressings and a tile roof. There are two storeys and six bays. The doorways have flush surrounds, there is one shop window, and the other windows are sashes.	II
The Whim Farmhouse; 53.19415°N 1.79783°W		Early 19th century	The farmhouse is in painted limestone with gritstone dressings, quoins, and a stone slate roof. There are two storeys and two bays. The central doorway has plain jambs and a lintel, and a moulded hood, and the windows are sashes.	II
Old Hall Cottages; 53.19419°N 1.77713°W		c. 1840	A terrace of four cottages, the left cottage added later. They are in limestone with gritstone dressings, quoins, and a tile roof hipped on the right. There are two storeys and six bays. The windows are sashes, some of the doorways have quoined surrounds, and some of the ground floor openings have Tudor-style hood moulds.	II
Chandlers; 53.19508°N 1.77753°W		Mid-19th century	A farmhouse in limestone with gritstone dressings, quoins, a plain eaves band, and a stone slate roof with coped gables and moulded kneelers. There are two storeys and three bays. The central doorway has a quoined surround, a fanlight, and a bracketed hood. The windows are sashes in quoined surrounds.	II
Telephone kiosk 53.19601°N 1.77732°W		1935	The K6 type telephone kiosk in an enclosure by the village green was designed by Giles Gilbert Scott. Constructed in cast iron with a square plan and a dome, it has three unperforated crowns in the top panels.	II
