= Benty Grange =

Site of Special Scientific Interest in Derbyshire, England

- Site of Special Scientific Interest
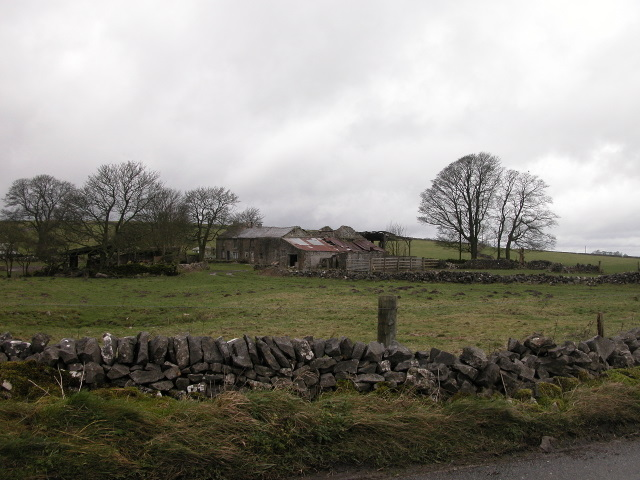
- Benty Grange Farm

- Location within Derbyshire
- Location of Benty Grange.
- Area of search: Derbyshire
- Coordinates: 53°10′30″N 1°46′48″W
- Area: 21.1 ha (0.21 km^{2}; 0.081 sq mi)
- Notification date: 19 June 2012

Benty Grange is a Site of Special Scientific Interest in the parish of Monyash in Derbyshire, England. 21.1 ha (52 acres) in size and with at least four grass species and ten other plant species, it is considered of national importance as one of the largest areas of unimproved species-rich neutral lowland grassland in the Peak District National Park. The area was confirmed as a Site of Special Scientific Interest on 8 March 2013, following notification of the designation on 19 June 2012.

Benty Grange is also the site of a large Anglo-Saxon barrow which on 23 October 1970 was listed as a scheduled monument. It was excavated on 3 May 1848 by the English antiquarian Thomas Bateman, who discovered a richly furnished burial which included the boar crested Benty Grange helmet, and fragments of the Benty Grange hanging bowl. The list entry for the barrow notes that other than this excavation, it is "undisturbed and retains significant archaeological remains."

== Description ==
Benty Grange is a 21.1 ha (52 acres) area of grassland in Monyash parish in Derbyshire, England. It covers eight plots of land tended by two owners, David Woolley and Mark Allen, and partially surrounds the Benty Grange farmhouse. Grasses in the area include Cynosurus cristatus, Anthoxanthum odoratum, Agrostis capillaris, and Festuca rubra; some other plants are Centaurea nigra, Ranunculus acris, Ranunculus bulbosus, Plantago lanceolata, Trifolium pratense, Leucanthemum vulgare, Lotus corniculatus, Hypochaeris radicata, Rumex acetosa, and Conopodium majus.

Notification of the designation as a Site of Special Scientific Interest was made on 19 June 2012. It was confirmed on 8 March 2013, over the objections of Woolley and five other parties in his support.

=== Barrow ===
Benty Grange also contains an Anglo-Saxon barrow which was designated a scheduled monument on 23 October 1970. The barrow has three elements: a central mound approximately .6 m (2 ft) high and 15 m (49 ft) in diameter, a surrounding fosse about .3 m (1 ft) deep and 1 m (3.3 ft) wide, and penannular outer banks around .2 m (0.66 ft) high and 3 m (10 ft) wide. Taken together, the entire barrow is approximately 23 by 22 m (75 by 72 ft). It was excavated on 3 May 1848 by English antiquarian Thomas Bateman, who discovered the Benty Grange helmet and the Benty Grange hanging bowl among the remains of a richly furnished burial. Historic England notes in the list entry for the barrow, however, that other for than Bateman's excavation the barrow is "undisturbed and retains significant archaeological remains", and that further investigation would return new information.

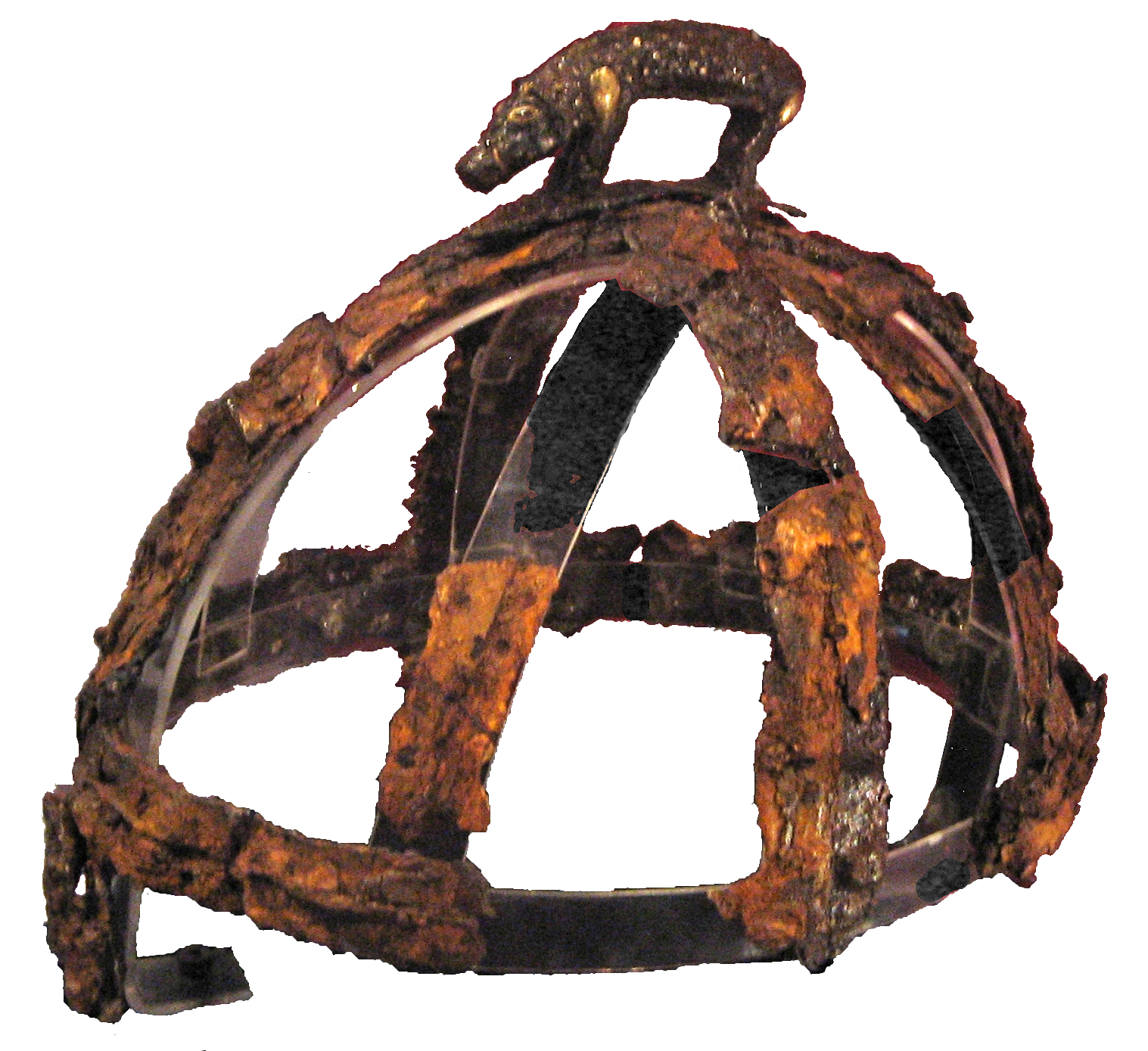
Benty Grange helmet

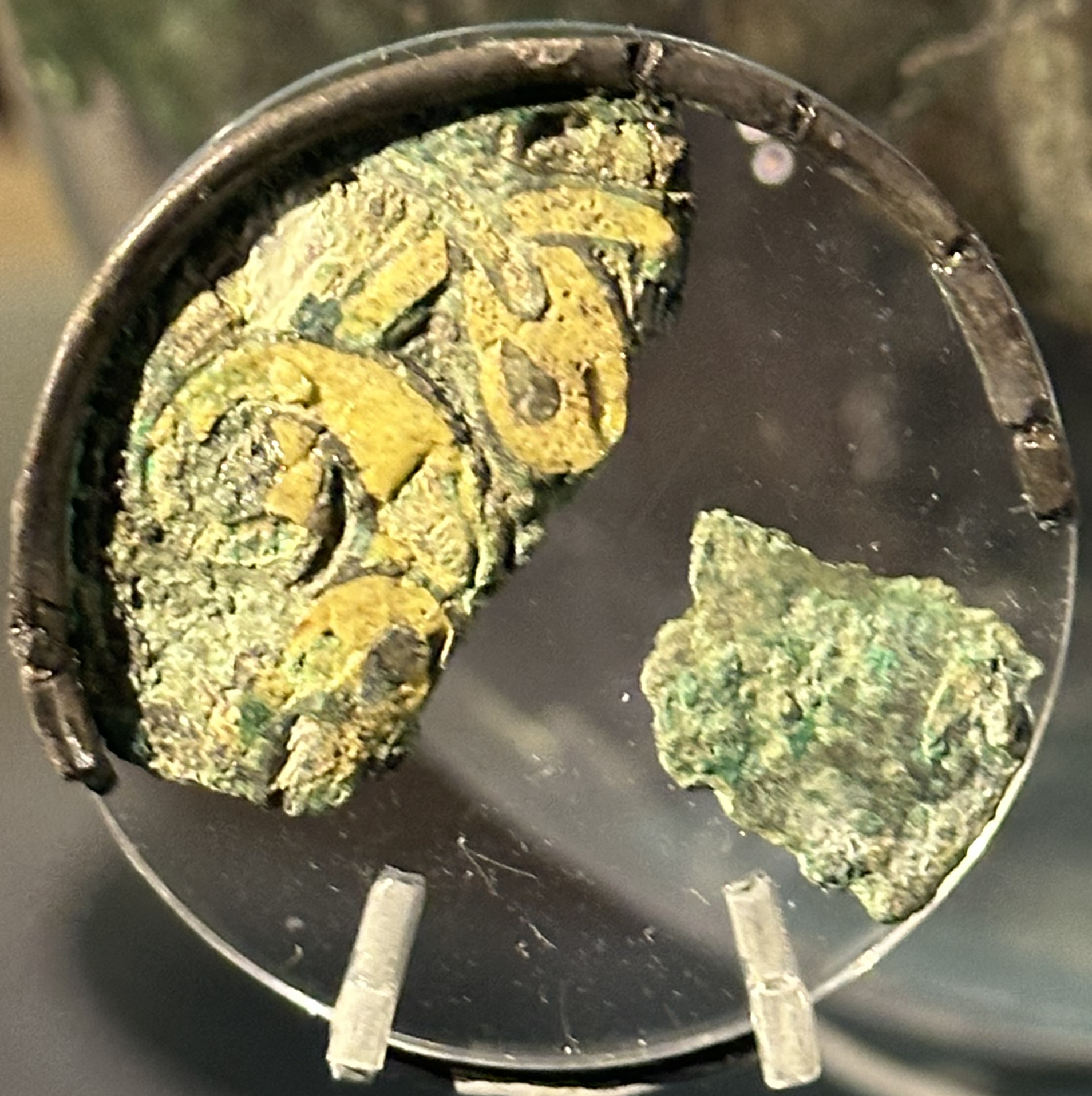
Benty Grange hanging bowl

== Bibliography ==
- Bateman, Thomas (1861). Ten Years' Digging in Celtic and Saxon Grave Hills, in the counties of Derby, Stafford, and York, from 1848 to 1858; with notices of some former discoveries, hitherto unpublished, and remarks on the crania and pottery from the mounds. London: John Russell Smith. pp. 28–33.
- "Benty Grange" (PDF). Designated Sites. Natural England. 19 June 2012.
- "Benty Grange Site of Special Scientific Interest (SSSI) – confirmation of notification" (PDF). National England. 6 March 2013. Archived from the original on 5 June 2014.
- "Benty Grange SSSI". Designated Sites. Natural England.
- Bruce-Mitford, Rupert (1974). Aspects of Anglo-Saxon Archaeology: Sutton Hoo and Other Discoveries. London: Victor Gollancz Limited. ISBN 0-575-01704-X.
- Fair, James (27 September 2018). "How Natural England lost its bite". The ENDS Report.
- Historic England. "Benty Grange hlaew, Monyash (1013767)". National Heritage List for England.
