= Catherine Karkov =

British art researcher

Catherine E. Karkov
- Occupation: Chair of Art History

Academic work
- Discipline: History of Art | Early medieval history, literature, and culture
- Institutions: University of Leeds

Catherine E. Karkov is professor of History of Art and head of the School of Fine Art, History of Art and Cultural Studies at the University of Leeds. Her research centres on early medieval art, especially Anglo-Saxon art, and she has published three monographs. Her first concerns Anglo-Saxon art; the second one on the relation between text and image in Anglo-Saxon literature; and the third on how Anglo-Saxon writers imagined England as a place, how Anglo-Saxon England is understood by modern audiences, and the "fraught history of 'Anglo-Saxon' studies".

== Work ==
Her second book focuses on MS Junius 11, she argues that a complete edition of the manuscript leaves out the many illustrations at its own peril; these illustrations occur at dramatic moments in the four poems and help elucidate the allegorical import of many passages.

As editor of Slow Scholarship, Karkov highlighted the ways in which research quality is measured in the UK (via the Research Excellence Framework), over work, publishing models which reward research that aligns with the status quo, an increasingly precarious workforce in Higher Education all contribute to making new and innovative scholarship difficult. The collection developed theories from the Slow Food movement to propose ways of creating thoughtful, new scholarship.

== Publications ==
=== Monographs ===
- Imagining Anglo-Saxon England: Utopia, Heterotopia, Dystopia (Boydell, 2020) ISBN 978-1783275199
- Slow Scholarship: Medieval Research and the Neoliberal University (Boydell, 2019) ISBN 978-1787447042
- The Art of Anglo-Saxon England (Boydell, 2011) ISBN 978-1843836285
- The Ruler Portraits of Anglo-Saxon England (Boydell, 2004) ISBN 978-1846152344
- Text and Picture in Anglo-Saxon England: Narrative Strategies in the Junius 11 Manuscript (Cambridge UP, 2001) ISBN 978-0521800693

=== Edited ===
- Disturbing Times: Medieval Pasts, Reimagined Futures (Punctum Books: 2020, with Anna Kłosowska and Vincent W.J. van Gerven Oei) ISBN 978-1-950192-75-5
- Cross and Cruciform in the Anglo-Saxon World: Studies to Honor the Memory of Timothy Reuter (Morgantown: West Virginia UP, 2010; with Sarah Keefer and Karen Jolly) ISBN 978-1933202501
- Poetry, Place and Gender: Studies in Medieval Culture in Honor of Helen Damico (Kalamazoo: Medieval Institute Press, 2009) ISBN 978-1580441278
- Early Medieval Studies in Memory of Patrick Wormald (Farnham: Ashgate, 2009, with S. Baxter and J. Nelson) ISBN 978-0754663317
- Cross and Culture in Anglo-Saxon England (Morgantown: West Virginia UniUP, 2008, with Sarah Keefer and Karen Jolly) ISBN 978-1933202235
- Karkov, Catherine E. & Damico, Helen, eds. (2008). Aedificia Nova: Studies in Honor of Rosemary Cramp. Publications of the Richard Rawlinson Center. Kalamazoo: Medieval Institute Publications, Western Michigan University. ISBN 978-1-58044-110-0.
