= Monyash =

Village in Derbyshire, England

Coordinates: 53°11′45″N 1°46′38″W

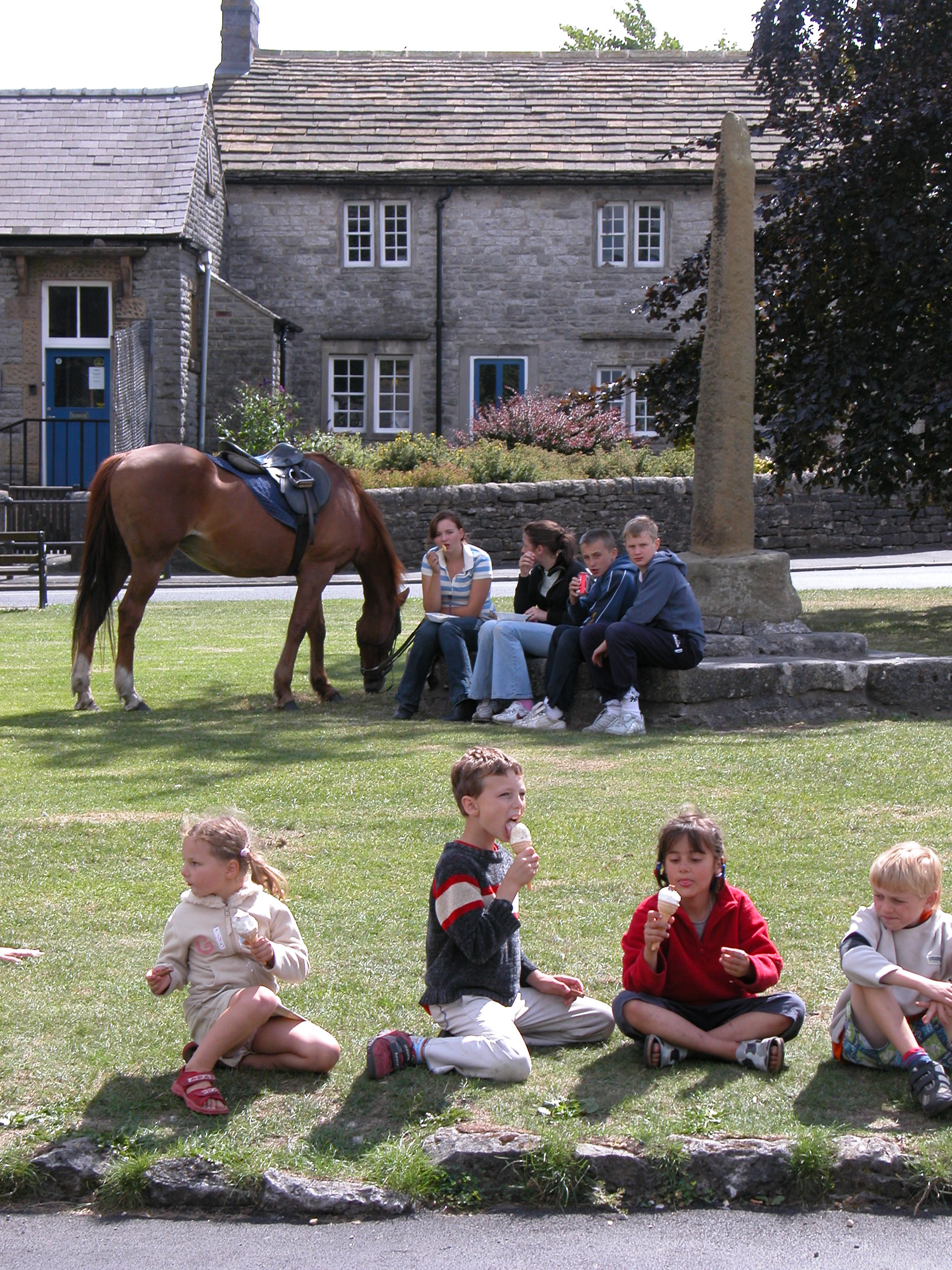
- Village green

- Location within Derbyshire
- Population: 314 (2011)
- OS grid reference: SK149665
- District: Derbyshire Dales
- Shire county: Derbyshire
- Region: East Midlands
- Country: England
- Sovereign state: United Kingdom
- Post town: BAKEWELL
- Postcode district: DE45
- Police: Derbyshire
- Fire: Derbyshire
- Ambulance: East Midlands
- UK Parliament: Derbyshire Dales

Monyash (/muhn-ee-ash/ munyash) is a village and civil parish in the Peak District, Derbyshire, England, 5 miles (8 km) west of the market town Bakewell. It is centred on a village green 265 metres (869 ft) above sea level at the head of Lathkill Dale in the limestone area known as the White Peak. At the 2011 census, it had a population of 314. Tourism and farming (milk, beef and lamb) are the predominant activities of the village. The area was once an important meeting place, a watering point for drovers’ animals at the intersection of several trade routes, and industrial centre supporting the local lead mining industry.

== History ==
People have been living in and around Monyash since Neolithic times (3750–1750 BC) and probably before then. The nearby impressive stone circle and henge, Arbor Low, was likely built around 2000 BC by people living in the village who also farmed the relatively fertile soils at the head of Lathkill Dale.

The village can attribute its existence, and its name, to water. Lying underneath the centre of the village is a narrow band of clay deposited during the Ice Age. This resulted in pools of standing water, a highly unusual feature in a limestone area. Over time meres (ponds) were fashioned into the clay by the villagers that enabled life before piped water. Only one remains today, called Fere Mere, which is situated behind the Primary School.

The Domesday Book of 1086 names the village as Maneis, a berewick of Bakewell and owned by the King. The name Maneis means "many springs or waters".

In an Anglo-Saxon tumulus on Benty Grange farm, in the south of the parish, the famous Benty Grange helmet was discovered in 1848.

During the 14th century Monyash prospered from the mining of lead and with the granting of a charter for a weekly market. Indeed, over the next few hundred years Monyash grew into a major lead mining area with its own Barmote Court. Besides farming, other activities included limestone quarrying and marble polishing. As a result of all this activity, by the middle of the 19th century, Monyash was a busy place, with a population of some 500 inhabitants, almost twice what it is today, with a wide range of trades including blacksmiths, cobblers, butchers, wheelwrights, wool merchants, joiners, dressmakers, shoe makers, and five pubs.

The village cross seen in the image of the village green is recorded as medieval dating from the time of Edward III, [1327-1377]. According the Derby HER (see external references).

== Buildings and structures ==
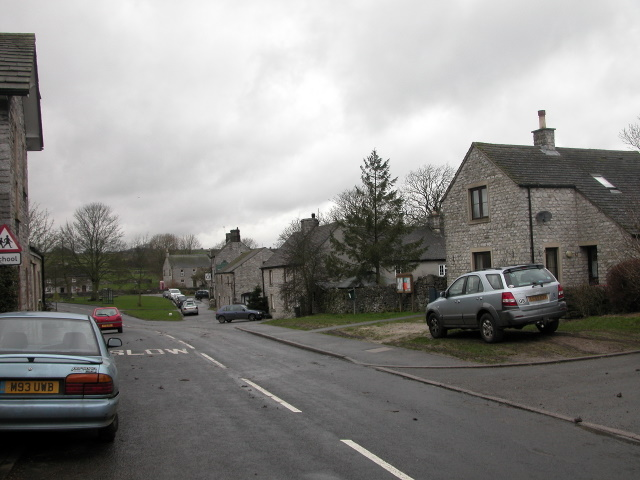
Housing on Main Street

St Leonard's Church, the parish church, was founded sometime between 1100 and 1192. It has a Norman piscina and sedilia. The building is a patchwork of additions and developments. The major enlargements took place around 1199, 1250, 1348 and 1370, followed by two major restorations in 1886–1888 (by William Butterfield) and 1996–2006. The church also contains a 15th-century font. Today the church is a grade II* listed building of national importance.

John Gratton (1640–1711), who lived in Monyash for 34 years, encouraged the development of the non-conformist movement, and from the late 18th century the village became a Quaker stronghold, often visited by the Radical Quaker statesman, John Bright. Many of the lead mines were in fact operated by the London Lead Company, a Quaker firm. On his death, Gratton left his cottage and some land, the cottage becoming the Friends' Meeting House, the 'Quaker Chapel'.

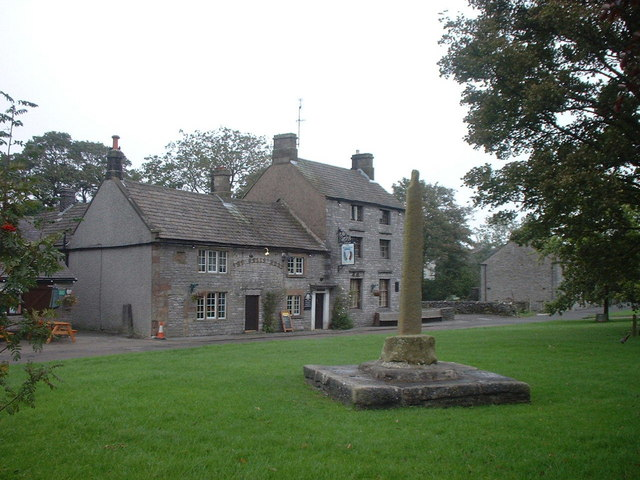
The Bulls Head

The present Methodist Chapel was built in two parts. The original Primitive Methodist chapel was erected in 1835 and is now the church hall. A new Primitive Methodist Chapel was joined onto it in 1888.

On the village green are the 'King' and 'Queen' trees, planted to celebrate the Coronation of King George V and Queen Mary in 1910.

The Pinfold, a pound, is located on the edge of Monyash, on the road towards Flagg. Stray cattle and sheep were rounded up by the Pinder into this small walled enclosure, from which they could be retrieved, after payment of a fee.

Today there is only one remaining pub (the Bull's Head), which dates from the late 17th / early 18th century. (During the Cold War, an early warning system was installed in the pub, circa 1981.) There is also a cafe (The Old Smithy Tea Rooms), and there are Public Toilets on the Bakewell side of the village, nearer Lathkill Dale.

The village has a newly refurbished play area which was designed by children from the local school.

== Festivals ==
Monyash also participates in the local custom of well dressing.

It has a school, a pub (The Bull's Head), a church, a chapel and a Quaker Meeting House.

The prehistoric Stone Circle Arbor Low is also just 2.8 miles from the village.

== See also ==
- Derbyshire lead mining history
- Listed buildings in Monyash
