= John Russell Smith =

English bookseller and bibliographer (1810–1894)

John Russell Smith (1810 – 19 October 1894) was an English bookseller and bibliographer. He is best known for his "Library of Old Authors" reprint series.

== Life ==
He was born at Sevenoaks, Kent in 1810, and was apprenticed to John Bryant of Wardour Street, London. He took a shop at 4 Old Compton Street, Soho, and concentrated on English topography and philology. Among his supporters was John Sheepshanks, the collector.

In 1842, there was a rift in the Archæological Association. One section of its members, including Thomas Wright, Mark Anthony Lower, James Orchard Halliwell-Phillipps, and Arthur Henfrey, transferred their publications to Russell Smith. The increase of business caused Russell Smith to move to 36 Soho Square.

Smith retired from business about 1884, when his stock and copyrights were sold; the "Library of Old Authors" was disposed of to the bookseller William Reeves, and his collection of engravings to Jonathan Nield. He died on 19 October 1894, in Kentish Town, aged 84.

== Works and publications ==
Smith issued in 1837 Bibliotheca Cantiana. The titles are classified with collations and notes; Smith left two copies, with manuscript annotations, to the British Museum. His Bibliographical List of the Works that have been published towards illustrating the Provincial Dialects of England, arranged by county, appeared in 1839, as well as Westmoreland and Cumberland Dialects.

Among the books Smith published were Robert Nares's Glossary (edited by Thomas Wright and Halliwell-Phillipps), William Barnes's Dialect Poems and Grammar, Edward Johnston Vernon's Guide to the Anglo-Saxon Tongue, and Joseph Bosworth's Anglo-Saxon Dictionary, abridged. He is best remembered for his "Library of Old Authors" series of reprints, mainly of sixteenth and seventeenth century literature, printed by the Chiswick Press and issued between 1856 and 1875.

Catalogues of secondhand books issued by Russell Smith included: one of topographical prints, drawings, and books printed before 1700 (1849); Shakesperiana (1864); Americana (1865); tracts, 26,000 in number (1874); and engraved portraits (1883). He contributed the list of English writers on fishes and fishing to Robert Blakey's Historical Sketches of Angling Literature (1855), with some copies separately issued as Bibliographical Catalogue of English Writers on Angling and Ichthyology (1856).

== Family ==
Smith married in 1844 Frances Caigou, daughter of the printer James Daniel Caigou. They had a son and a daughter.
