= Helen Damico =

American literary scholar

- Born: Helen Pittas; January 30, 1931; Chios, Greece
- Died: April 14, 2020 (aged 89); Akron, Ohio, United States
- Occupation: Literature scholar

Helen Damico (January 30, 1931 – April 14, 2020) was a Greek-born American scholar of Old English and Old English literature.

== Life and career ==
Born in Chios, Greece, Damico emigrated to the United States in 1937.

She earned her B.A. from the University of Iowa in 1952, and was on the faculty of Brooklyn College, followed by the University of Minnesota. She received her Ph.D. from New York University in 1980.

At the University of New Mexico she began teaching in 1981, later founding the Institute for Medieval Studies. She finally became Professor Emerita.

The author of Beowulf's Wealhtheow and the Valkyrie Tradition, Damico made important contributions to the study of women in Old English and Old Norse literature, and her work on Wealhþeow is frequently cited. She saw representations of the valkyrie in both Wealhþeow and Grendel's Mother in the Old English poem Beowulf (c. 700–1000 AD).

Damico was a recipient of the New Mexico Humanities Award for Lifetime Contributions to the Humanities, and a recipient of the Medieval Academy of America's CARA Award for Outstanding Service to Medieval Studies.

== Death ==
She died on April 14, 2020, as a result of COVID-19.

== Books authored and edited ==
=== Monographs ===
- Beowulf's Wealhtheow and the Valkyrie Tradition (1984)
- Beowulf and the Grendel-kin: Politics and Poetry in Eleventh-Century England (2015)

=== Edited collections ===
- Karkov, Catherine E. & Damico, Helen, eds. (2008). Aedificia Nova: Studies in Honor of Rosemary Cramp. Publications of the Richard Rawlinson Center. Kalamazoo: Medieval Institute Publications, Western Michigan University. ISBN 978-1-58044-110-0.
- Medieval Scholarship: Biographical Studies on the Formation of a Discipline (3 vols)
- Heroic Poetry in the Anglo-Saxon Period: Studies in Honor of Jess B. Bessinger, Jr. (with John Leyerle; Kalamazoo: Medieval Institute Publications, Western Michigan University, 1993)
- New Readings on Women in Old English Literature. Eds. Helen Damico and Alexandra Hennessey Olsen. Bloomington: Indiana University Press, 1990. 176–89

=== Essays ===
- "The Valkyrie Reflex in Old English Literature." In New Readings on Women in Old English Literature. Eds. Helen Damico and Alexandra Hennessey Olsen. Bloomington: Indiana University Press, 1990. 176–89
