= Staffordshire helmet =

7th century Anglo-Saxon helmet

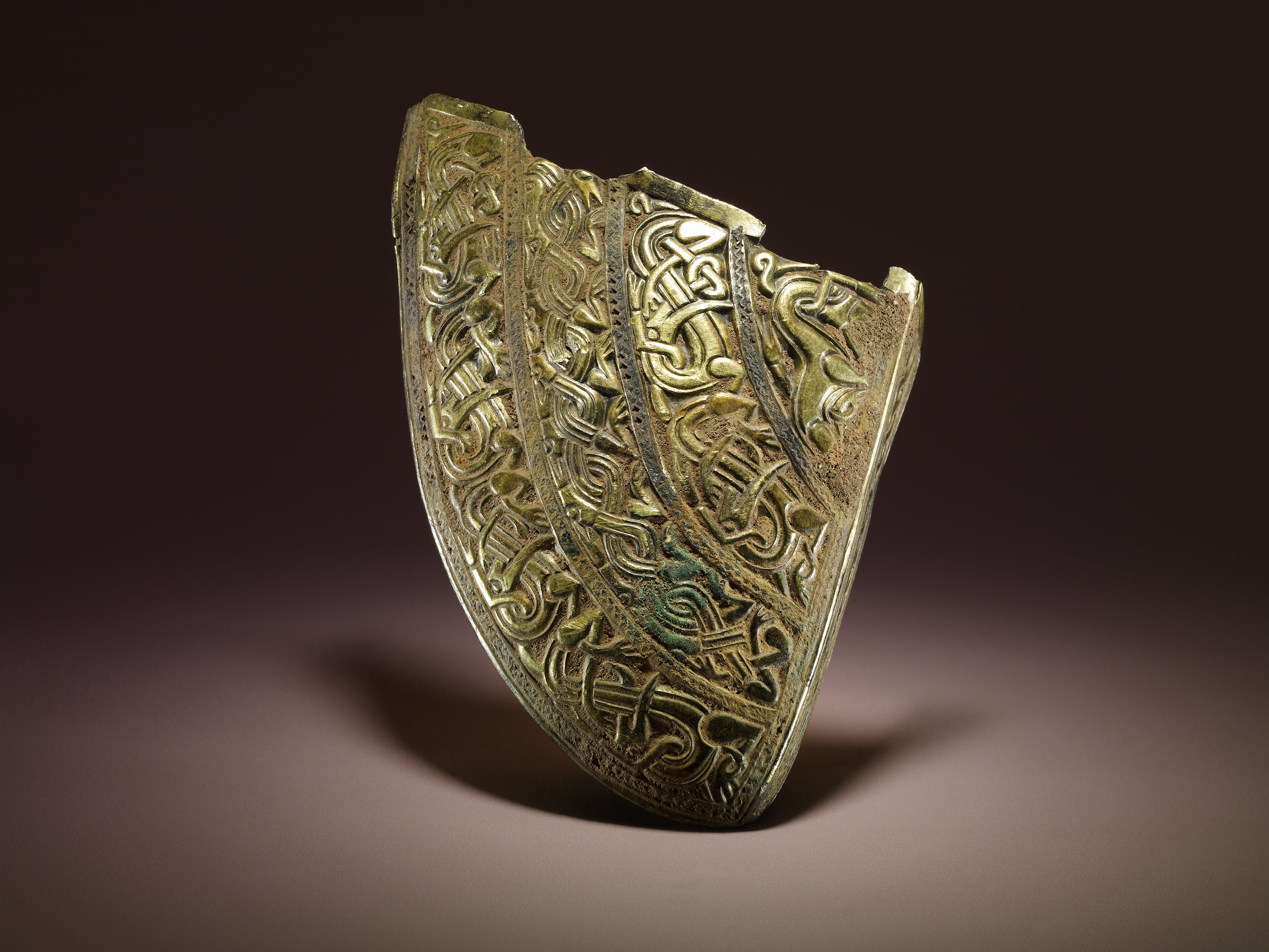
Cheek guard from the Staffordshire helmet

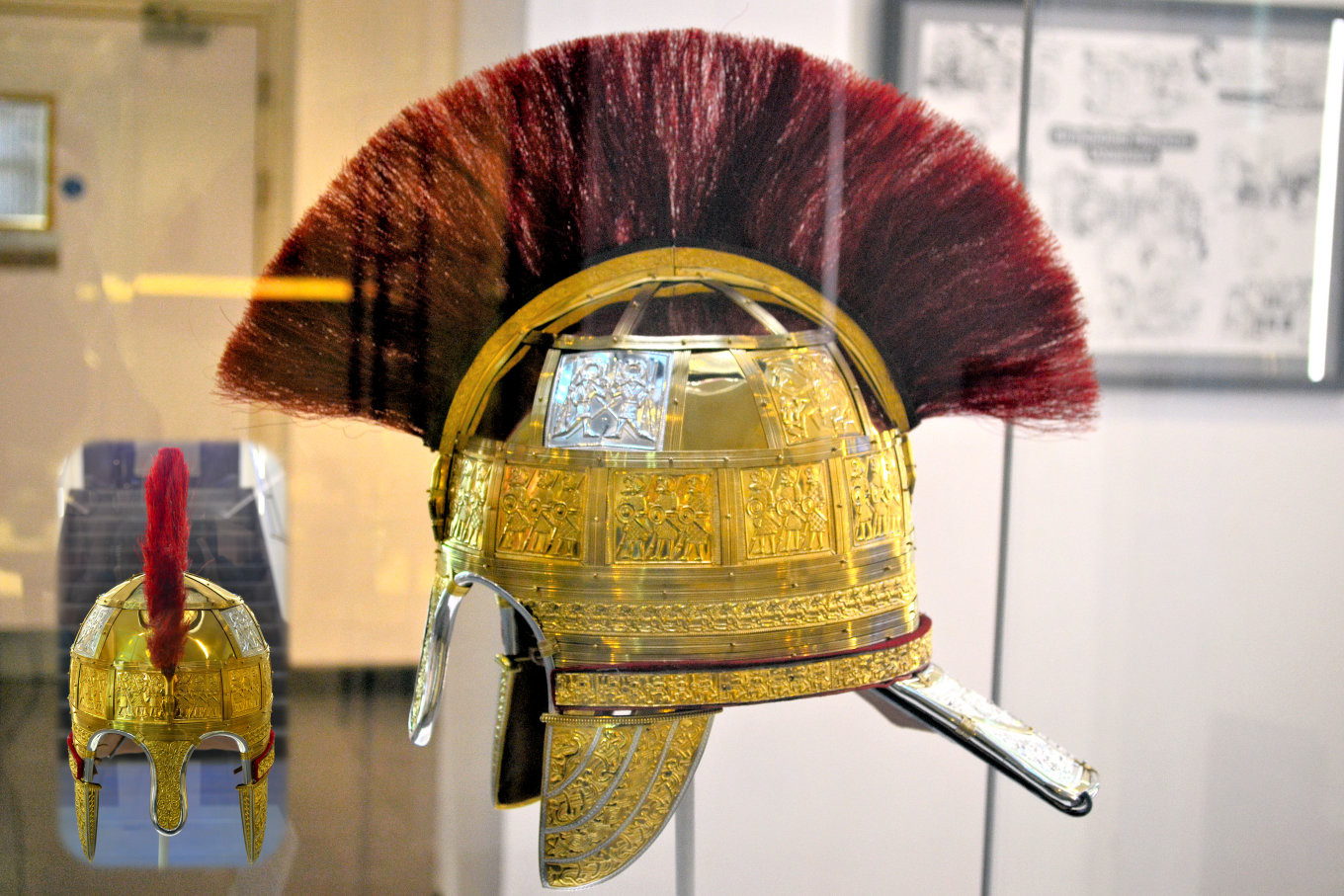
Replica of the Staffordshire helmet, Birmingham Museum and Art Gallery

The Staffordshire helmet is an Anglo-Saxon helmet discovered in 2009 as part of the Staffordshire Hoard. It is part of the largest discovery of contemporary gold and silver metalwork in Britain, which contained more than 4,000 precious fragments, approximately a third of which came from a single high-status helmet. Following those found at Benty Grange (1848), Sutton Hoo (1939), Coppergate (1982), Wollaston (1997), and Shorwell (2004), it is only the sixth known Anglo-Saxon helmet.

The helmet, along with the entire hoard, was purchased jointly by the Birmingham Museum & Art Gallery and the Potteries Museum & Art Gallery, and is currently undergoing conservation work. In 2012 a second find of metalwork, including the second cheek guard, was made at the original site.

The helmet is believed to have been made around AD 600–650. Two replicas of the crested helmet have been made for display in the museums in Birmingham and Stoke.

== Bibliography ==
- Blakelock, Eleanor S. (20 February 2014). "XRF Analysis of Silver Foils from the Staffordshire Hoard" (PDF). Staffordshire Hoard Research Reports (8). British Museum.
- Blakelock, Eleanor S. (2015). "XRF Study of Silver Objects from the Staffordshire Hoard" (PDF). Staffordshire Hoard Research Reports (19). British Museum.
  - Appendix 3
- Blakelock, Eleanor S. (2016). "The Analysis and Documentation of Niello Objects in the Staffordshire Hoard" (PDF). Staffordshire Hoard Research Reports (21). British Museum.
- Butterworth, Jenni; Fregni, Giovanna; Fuller, Kayleigh & Greaves, Pieta (2016). "The importance of multidisciplinary work within archaeological conservation projects: assembly of the Staffordshire Hoard die-impressed sheets". Journal of the Institute of Conservation. 39 (1). Institute of Conservation: 29–43. doi:10.1080/19455224.2016.1155071.
- Fern, Chris & Butterworth, Jenni (2022). Warrior Treasure: The Staffordshire Hoard in Anglo-Saxon England. Liverpool University Press. doi:10.2307/j.ctv2tjdgbz. ISBN 978-1-80085-481-9. JSTOR j.ctv2tjdgbz. S2CID 251477390.
- Fern, Chris & Speake, George (2014). Beasts, Birds and Gods: Interpreting the Staffordshire Hoard. Warwickshire: West Midlands History. ISBN 978-1-905036-20-2.
- Fern, Chris; Dickinson, Tania & Webster, Leslie, eds. (2019). The Staffordshire Hoard: An Anglo-Saxon Treasure. Research Report of the Society of Antiquaries of London. Vol. 80. London: Society of Antiquaries of London. doi:10.26530/20.500.12657/39941. hdl:20.500.12657/39941. ISBN 978-1-5272-3350-8.
- Hilts, Carly (April 2019). "Crowning Glory: Reconstructing the Staffordshire Hoard helmet". Current Archaeology (349). Current Publishing: 36–41. ISSN 0011-3212.
- Magnoler, Deborah L. (3 November 2011). "K453 and the 'Cheek piece' Group". Staffordshire Hoard. Archived from the original on 18 May 2017.
- "New finds discovered in Staffordshire Hoard field". Staffordshire Hoard. 18 December 2012.
- "New Secrets of Staffordshire Hoard Revealed". Popular Archaeology. 23. Summer 2016.
- Pilkington, Andrew (19 October 2012). "The Staffordshire Hoard Horseman Helmet Foil". Staffordshire Hoard.
- Ramirez, Janina (2 April 2019). "Staffordshire Hoard Helmet" (Podcast). Art Detective.
- "School of Jewellery helps to reconstruct Staffordshire Hoard Helmet". Birmingham City School of Jewellery. 23 November 2018.
- Shearman, Fleur; Camurcuoglu, Duygu; Hockey, Marilyn & McArthur, Graeme (October 2014). "Investigative Conservation of the Die-impressed Sheet from the Staffordshire Hoard" (PDF). Staffordshire Hoard Research Reports (17). British Museum.
- Williams, Howard (2022). "The Staffordshire Hoard Conservation Program: an interview with Pieta Greaves". In Williams, Howard; Reavill, Peter & Clague, Samuel (eds.). The Public Archaeology of Treasure. Oxford: Archaeopress. pp. 96–112. ISBN 978-1-80327-310-5. Archived from the original on 28 November 2022.
