= George Speake =

English art historian and archaeologist (1944/1945–2026)

George Speake FSA
- Born: 1944
- Died: 15 January 2026 (aged 81)
- Education: Slade School of Fine Art
- Alma mater: University of Oxford
- Known for: Leading authority on Anglo-Saxon animal art
- Scientific career
- Fields: Art history and archaeology
- Institutions: Institute of Archaeology at Oxford
- Thesis: The beginnings and developments of Salin's style II in England (1974)
- Doctoral advisor: Sonia Chadwick Hawkes
- Other academic advisors: Christopher Hawkes; Sonia Chadwick Hawkes

George Speake, FSA (1944 or 1945 – 15 January 2026) was an English art historian and archaeologist. He was an Honorary Research Fellow at the Institute of Archaeology at Oxford, and "a leading authority on Anglo-Saxon animal art." Speake was latterly the Anglo-Saxon Art and Iconography Specialist for the Staffordshire Hoard conservation team, and worked on the reconstruction of the Staffordshire helmet.

== Early life and education ==
George Speake was educated at the Slade School of Fine Art in the 1960s, and the University of Oxford, where he studied at St John's College and at the Institute of Archaeology, in the 1970s. At Oxford he studied under Christopher and Sonia Hawkes, obtaining a Ph.D. in 1974 with a thesis about Anglo-Saxon animal art.

== Career ==
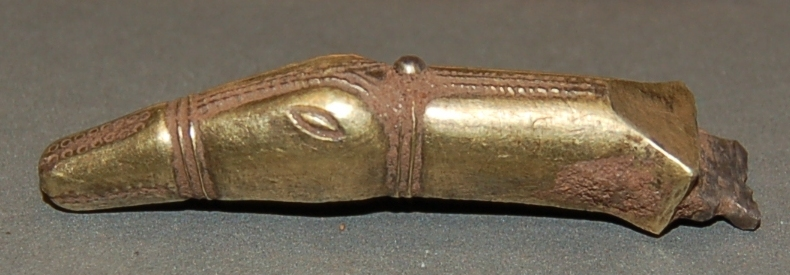
Horse head terminal from the Staffordshire helmet

Speake specialised in Anglo-Saxon art and iconography. As of 2016 he was working on the reconstruction of the more than 1,000 pieces of the Staffordshire helmet, following work on the Prittlewell burial, and teaching fine art and art history. In 2014 he coauthored a book on the Staffordshire Hoard, Beasts, Birds and Gods: Interpreting the Staffordshire Hoard, identifying among other characteristics an "eyeless, open-jawed serpent" depicted on the helmet's cheek guard. A paper on the helmet was due to be published in 2018. He was also an Honorary Research Fellow at the Institute of Archaeology at Oxford.

Speake's 1980 work Anglo-Saxon Animal Art and its Germanic Background, written as the basis for his Ph.D., is considered "a major break-through in Anglo-Saxon style studies". It provided a comprehensive look at "style II" art, the form of zoomorphic decoration used in Northern Europe from the middle of the sixth century AD to the end of the seventh. Hitherto the least understood style of Anglo-Saxon and Scandinavian animal art, style II is thought to have been reserved for the upper classes and is found prominently on the objects found in the Sutton Hoo ship-burial and in the Vendel boat graves. Speake's work was credited with discussing every known example of the style through 1974—the date of his Ph.D.—and with proving that it was introduced to England from Denmark, Norway, and Sweden.

== Personal life ==
Speake's wife, Birgitte, worked as the head of conservation at the Pitt Rivers Museum. They had 2 children:Maria and Caspar Speake. George Speake died on 15 January 2026, at the age of 81, leaving his twin brother John; older sister Heather and younger brother Dennis.

== Publications ==
- Speake, George (1970). "A Seventh-Century Coin Pendant from Bacton, Norfolk and its Ornament" (PDF). Medieval Archaeology. 14. Society for Medieval Archaeology: 1–16. doi:10.1080/00766097.1970.11735323.
- Hawkes, Sonia Chadwick; Speake, George & Northover, Peter (December 1979). "A Seventh-Century Bronze Metalworker's Die from Rochester, Kent". Frühmittelalterliche Studien. 13: 382–392. doi:10.1515/9783110242126.382.
- Speake, George (1980). Anglo-Saxon Animal Art. Oxford: Clarendon Press. ISBN 0-19-813194-1. LCCN 79-41091.
- Speake, George (1982). "A Romano-British sculptured relief from Stonesfield, Oxon". The Antiquaries Journal. LXII (2). Society of Antiquaries of London: 377–379. doi:10.1017/S0003581500065975.
- Speake, George (1989). "A Saxon Bed-Burial on Swallowcliffe Down". English Heritage Archaeological Reports. 10. London: Historic Buildings and Monuments Commission for England. ISBN 1-85074-211-1.
- Dickinson, Tania M. & Speake, George (1992). "The Seventh-Century Cremation Burial in Asthall Barrow, Oxfordshire: A Reassessment". In Carver, Martin (ed.). The Age of Sutton Hoo: The seventh century in north-western Europe. Woodbridge: Boydell Press. pp. 95–130. ISBN 0-85115-330-5.
- Speake, George (2007). "Interlace: Thoughts and Observations". In Henig, Martin & Smith, Tyler Jo (eds.). Collectanea Antiqua: Essays in Memory of Sonia Chadwick Hawkes. British Archaeological Reports. Vol. 1673. pp. 127–131. ISBN 978-1407301082.
- Speake, George (2012). "An Early Romano-British Villa at Combe East End". Oxoniensia. LXXVII. Oxfordshire Architectural and Historical Society: 1–90. ISSN 0308-5562.
- Fern, Chris; Speake, George (2014). Beasts, Birds and Gods: Interpreting the Staffordshire Hoard. Warwickshire: West Midlands History. ISBN 978-1-905036-20-2.
- Speake, George. Aspects of the Staffordshire Hoard Helmet (forthcoming).

== Bibliography ==
- Butterworth, Jenni; Fregni, Giovanna; Fuller, Kayleigh & Greaves, Pieta (2016). "The importance of multidisciplinary work within archaeological conservation projects: assembly of the Staffordshire Hoard die-impressed sheets". Journal of the Institute of Conservation. 39 (1). Institute of Conservation: 29–43. doi:10.1080/19455224.2016.1155071.
- "George Speake DFA(Lond) DPhil FSA" (PDF). Barbican Research Associates.
- Hawkes, Sonia Chadwick (September 1983). "Review: Anglo-Saxon Animal Art and its Germanic Background". The Antiquaries Journal. LXIII (3). Society of Antiquaries of London: 446–448. doi:10.1017/S0003581500067019.
- Higgitt, John (1982). "Review: Anglo-Saxon Animal Art and its Germanic Background". Journal of the British Archaeological Association. 135 (1): 62–64. doi:10.1179/jba.1982.135.1.62.
- Hills, Catherine (November 1981). "Review: Anglo-Saxon Animal Art and its Germanic Background". Antiquity. LV (215): 225–226. doi:10.1017/S0003598X00044288.
- "A hoard act to follow: catching up with the Staffordshire conservation team". Institute of Conservation. 8 February 2016.
- "Peopling Insular Art: Practice, Performance, Perception" (PDF). University of Glasgow. May 2017.
- Raw, Barbara C. (1981). "Review: Anglo-Saxon Animal Art and its Germanic Background". Medium Ævum. L (1): 327–328. JSTOR 43628628.
- "The Typology and Art History Team". Barbican Research Associates. Archived from the original on 4 November 2016.
- Young, Bailey K. (1983). "Review: Anglo-Saxon Animal Art and its Germanic Background". Revue Archéologique (2): 375–378. JSTOR 41737074.
