= Antiquities of the Jews =

Historiographical work by historian Flavius Josephus

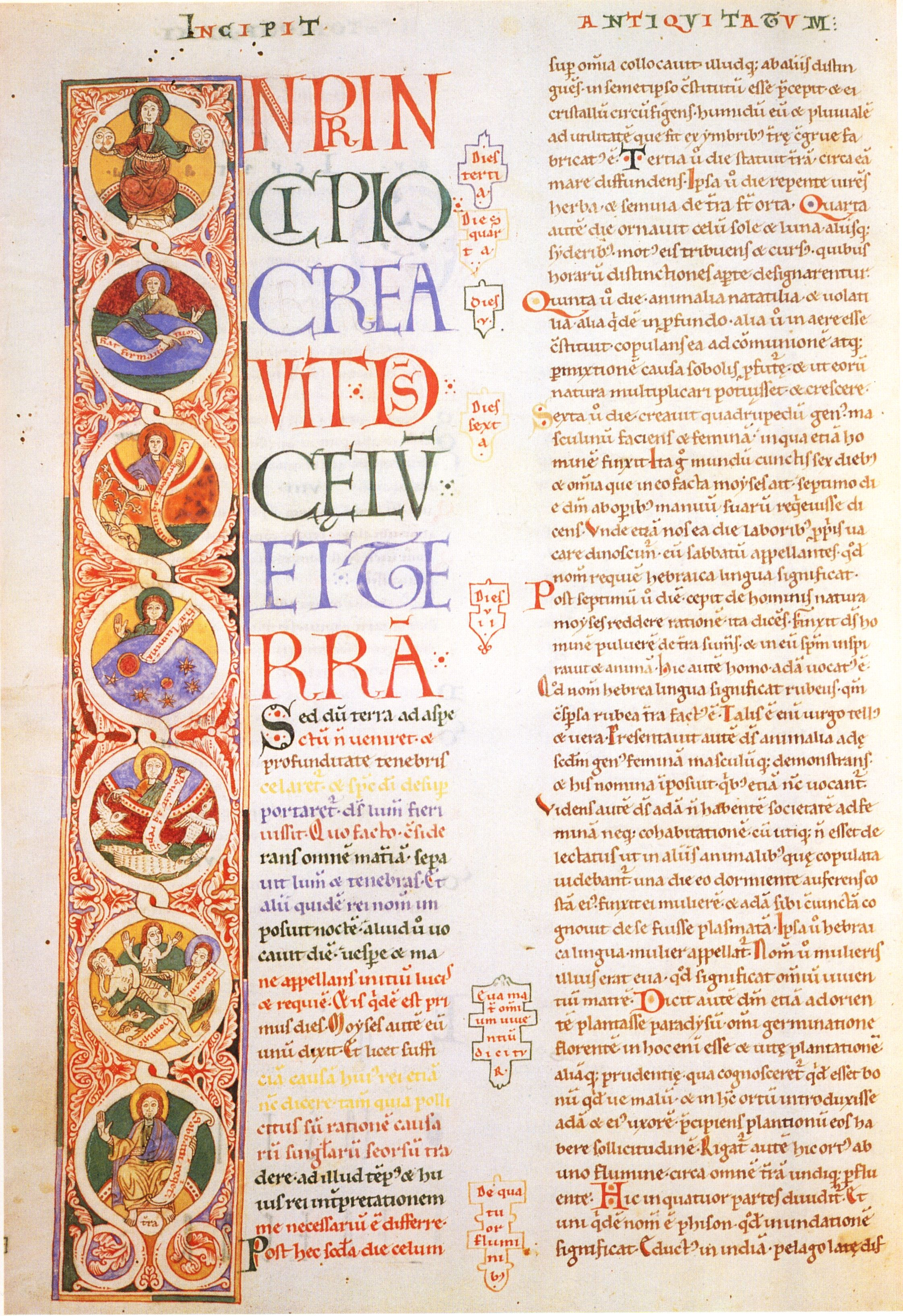
- 11th-century illuminated manuscript
- Author: Flavius Josephus
- Original title: Ἰουδαϊκὴ ἀρχαιολογία
- Translator: Thomas Lodge; William Whiston; Henry St. John Thackeray; Ralph Marcus
- Language: Koine Greek
- Subject: Jewish history
- Genre: historiography
- Published: 93/94 CE
- Publication place: Roman Empire
- English publication date: 1602
- Media type: Manuscript
- Dewey Decimal: 296.093
- LC Class: DS116.J7418
- Original text: Ἰουδαϊκὴ ἀρχαιολογία at Greek Wikisource
- Translation: Antiquities of the Jews at Wikisource

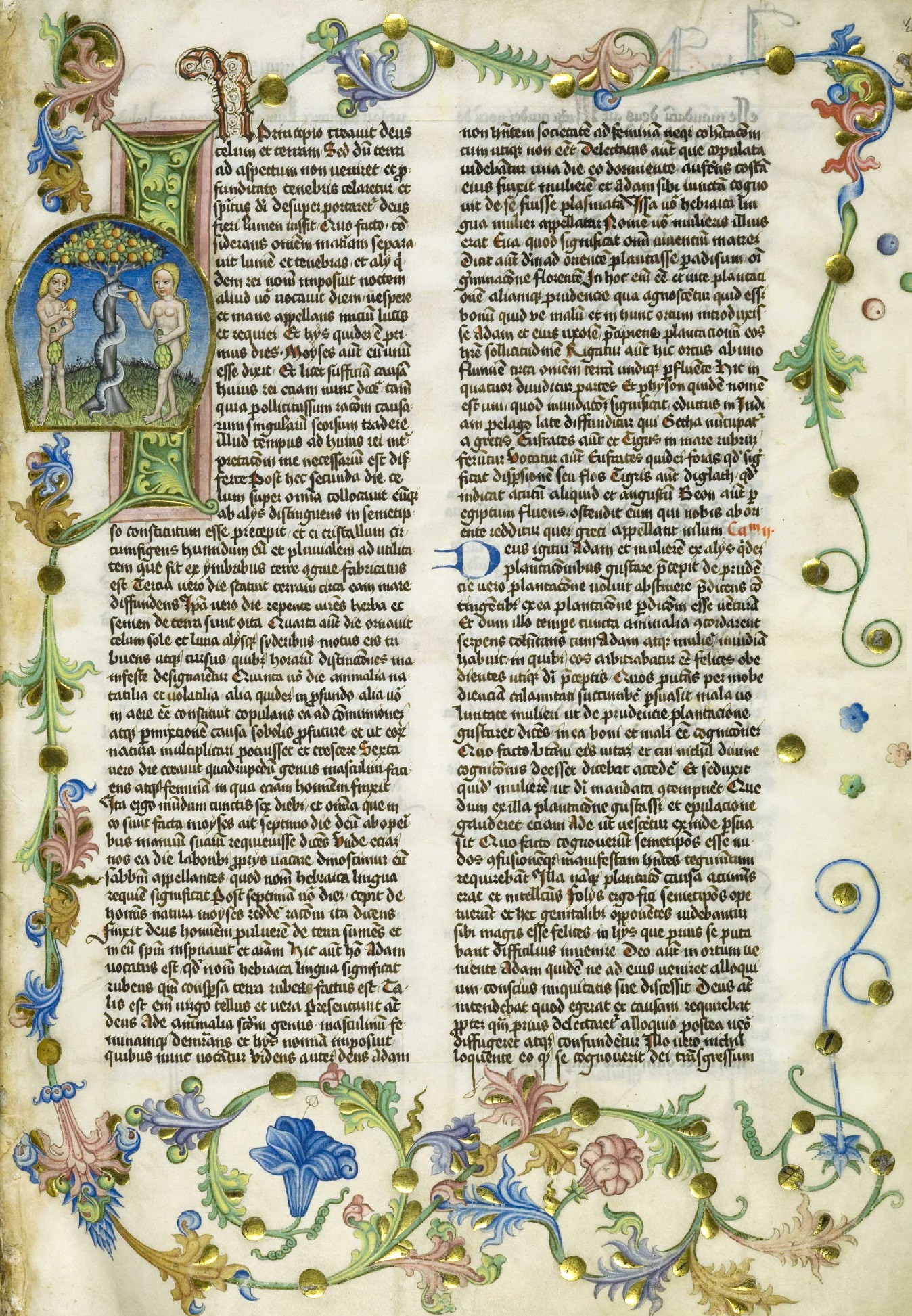
A leaf from the 1466 manuscript of the Antiquitates Iudaice, National Library of Poland

Antiquities of the Jews (Latin: Antiquitates Iudaicae; Greek: Ἰουδαϊκὴ ἀρχαιολογία, Ioudaikē archaiologia) is a 20-volume historiographical work, written in Greek, by the Roman-Jewish historian Josephus in the 13th year of the reign of the Roman emperor Domitian, which was 94 CE. It contains an account of the history of the Jewish people for Josephus's gentile patrons. In the first ten volumes Josephus follows the events of the Hebrew Bible beginning with the creation of Adam and Eve.

The latter ten volumes continue the history of the Jewish people beyond the biblical text and up to the First Jewish–Roman War (66–73 CE). This work, along with Josephus's other major work, The Jewish War (De Bello Iudaico), provides valuable background material for historians wishing to understand 1st-century CE Judaism and the early Christian period.

== Content ==
Josephus's Antiquities of the Jews is a vital source for the history of the intertestamental period and the Jewish war against Rome. Antiquities of the Jews is separated into twenty volumes:

Volume	From	To	Years covered
I	Biblical creation	Death of Abraham's son Isaac	3,833
II	History of Isaac's sons	The Exodus of Jews from Biblical Egypt	250
III	Exodus from Egypt	First 2 years of the 40 years in the wilderness	2
IV	The remaining 38 years in the wilderness	Death of Moses upon reaching Canaan	38
V	Joshua's replacement of Moses as leader	Death of the priest Eli	476
VI	The capture of the Ark by the Philistines	Death of King Saul	32
VII	David's ascension to the throne of the Kingdom of Israel	Death of King David	40
VIII	Solomon's ascension as King of Israel	The death of King Ahab in battle with the Syrian army, and the saving of the army by Jehoshaphat	163
IX	Reign of King Jehoshaphat	Fall of Samaria	157
X	Babylonian captivity of the Jews	Daniel and the destruction of the Neo-Assyrian Empire	182
XI	Start of the Persian Empire of Cyrus the Great	Death of Alexander the Great	253
XII	Death of Alexander the Great	Maccabean Revolt and the death of Judas Maccabeus	170
XIII	Origins of the Hasmonean dynasty	Death of Queen Alexandra	82
XIV	The death of Queen Alexandra	Death of Antigonus II Mattathias	32
XV	Herod the Great's taking of Jerusalem	Completion of King Herod's temple in Jerusalem	18
XVI	Completion of King Herod's temple	Death of Herod's sons	12
XVII	Death of Herod's sons	Banishment of King Archelaus	14
XVIII	The banishment of King Herod Archelaus	Banishment of the Jews living in Babylon	32
XIX	The banishment of the Jews living in Babylon	Cuspius Fadus, the Roman procurators of Judea	3
XX	The time of Emperor Claudius	Gessius Florus, Procurator of Judea. His antagonism of the Jews led to the Jewish Wars	22

In the preface of Antiquities of the Jews, Josephus provides his motivation for composing such a large work. He writes:

Now I have undertaken the present work, as thinking it will appear to all the Greeks worthy of their study; for it will contain all our antiquities, and the constitution of our government, as interpreted out of the Hebrew Scriptures.

Josephan scholar Louis Feldman highlights several of the misconceptions about the Jewish people that were being circulated in Josephus's time. In particular, the Jews were thought to lack great historical figures and a credible history of their people. They were also accused of harboring hostility toward non-Jews, and were thought to be generally lacking in loyalty, respect for authority, and charity. With these harsh accusations against the Jews fluttering about the Roman empire, Josephus, set out to provide a Hellenized version of the Jewish history. Such a work is often called an "apologia," as it pleads the case of a group of people or set of beliefs to a larger audience.

In order to accomplish this goal, Josephus omitted certain accounts in the Jewish narrative and even added a Hellenistic "glaze" to his work. For example, the "Song of the Sea" sung by Moses and the people of Israel after their deliverance at the Red Sea is completely omitted in Josephus's text. He does mention, however, that Moses composed a song to God in hexameter—a rather unusual (and Greek) metrical scheme for ancient Hebrew. Josephus also writes that Abraham taught science to the Egyptians, who in turn taught the Greeks, and that Moses set up a senatorial priestly aristocracy, which like Rome resisted monarchy. Thus, in an attempt to make the Jewish history more palatable to his Greco-Roman audience, the great figures of the biblical stories are presented as ideal philosopher-leaders.

In another example, apparently due to his concern with pagan antisemitism, Josephus omitted the entire episode of the golden calf from his account of the Israelites at Mount Sinai. It has been suggested that he was afraid that the biblical account might be employed by Alexandrian antisemites to lend credence to their allegation that the Jews worshiped an ass's head in the Temple (cf. Apion 2:80, 114, 120; Tacitus, Histories 5:4). He also stated that the Ancient Egyptians forced the Jewish slaves to build the pyramids, writing "They [the Egyptian taskmasters] set them also to build pyramids."

Josephus also adds a short account of his personal life, Vita, as an appendix to the Judean Antiquities.

Antiquities of the Jews contains a good deal of valuable, sometimes unique, historical material. This applies, for example, to the history of the Hellenistic states, Parthia, Armenia, the Nabatean kingdom, and the Roman Empire. In the Middle Ages and up to modern times the book was considered one of the most important sources in ancient Roman history, along with the works of Titus Livius, Tacitus, Suetonius, and Jerome. Because of this, Josephus is sometimes called the "Titus Livius of the Greeks".

The Jewish Encyclopedia speculates that much of Josephus's writings on Herod the Great and his sons draw from the work of Nicolaus of Damascus, a personal friend of Herod's, whose writings remain largely missing; once Nicolaus's narrative on Herod Archelaus ends, Josephus's narrative becomes less detailed. Josephus admitted being familiar with Nicolaus's work but also rebuked Nicolaus for exaggerating Herod's royal claims and benevolence, where Josephus treated Herod as a tyrant.

The extant copies of this work contain two passages about Jesus and James the Just. The long one has come to be known as the Testimonium Flavianum. Scholars usually agree on the authenticity of the second passage, while the first one is considered to be authentic, but to have been subjected to Christian interpolation.

== Manuscripts ==
The earliest Greek manuscript of Books 11–20 of the Antiquities dates from the 11th century, the Ambrosianus 370 (F 128); preserved in the Biblioteca Ambrosiana in Milan. However, the manuscript tradition is complex and many manuscripts are incomplete.

The works of Josephus Flavius were popular in late antiquity. Then appeared the translation of "Antiquities of the Jews" into Latin. It is attributed to either Jerome or his contemporary Tyrannius Rufinus. In medieval Europe, "Antiquities of the Jews" circulated widely, mainly in Latin translation (e.g Antiquities of the Jews from 1466 in the National Library of Poland).

This work of Joseph Flavius was translated into Old Bulgarian at the Preslav Literary School in the beginning of the 10th century during the time of Simeon the Great.

In the 9th–10th centuries, the so-called "Josippon", written in Hebrew, appeared in Italy. It described the events of world and Jewish history from the time of the construction of the Tower of Babel to the capture of Jerusalem by the Romans in 70 CE. Essentially, this chronicle was an abbreviated translation of Jewish Antiquities and The Jewish War, but Joseph ben Gorion was named the author. Josippon gained no less popularity than Antiquities of the Jews. With the advent of printing, it was published even before this major work of Josephus Flavius in 1476.

== Translations ==
In 1602, Thomas Lodge published an English translation of both the Antiquities and the Wars. This volume amounted to over 800 pages.

The first printed edition of Antiquities of the Jews in Greek appeared in 1544. Other publications followed—1553 (Antwerp), 1611 and 1634 (Cologne), 1687 (Oxford), 1691 (Leipzig), 1700 (Oxford), 1726 (Leiden), and so on. Already in the 15th–16th centuries, Jewish Antiquities was translated into Dutch, French, Italian, German and Spanish. The book was published both in modern languages and in Latin. The first Russian translation of Jewish Antiquities appeared in 1781. The first Italian translation dates to 1549 in Venice.

One of the best known translations of this work was provided by William Whiston in 1737, which has been in print continuously since then. The Loeb Classical Library published a 1926 translation by Henry St. John Thackeray and Ralph Marcus, normally preferred academically. A cross-reference apparatus for the works of Josephus and the Biblical canon also exists.

== Analysis ==
Fergus Millar assigns exceptional importance to the work. In his words, the work has "a claim to be regarded as the most significant single work written in the Roman Empire." He bases this assessment on its presentation of the Jewish past as an unbroken historical sequence from the world's creation up to Josephus's own day. For Millar, the work exemplifies the unusual survival of Jewish historical consciousness under Roman rule, given that other peoples absorbed into the Greco-Roman world typically saw their identity fade.

== See also ==
- Annals (Tacitus)
- Josephus on Jesus
- Pseudo-Philo
- Acme (enslaved woman)
