= Julia Velva =

British-Roman woman known from her tombstone in York

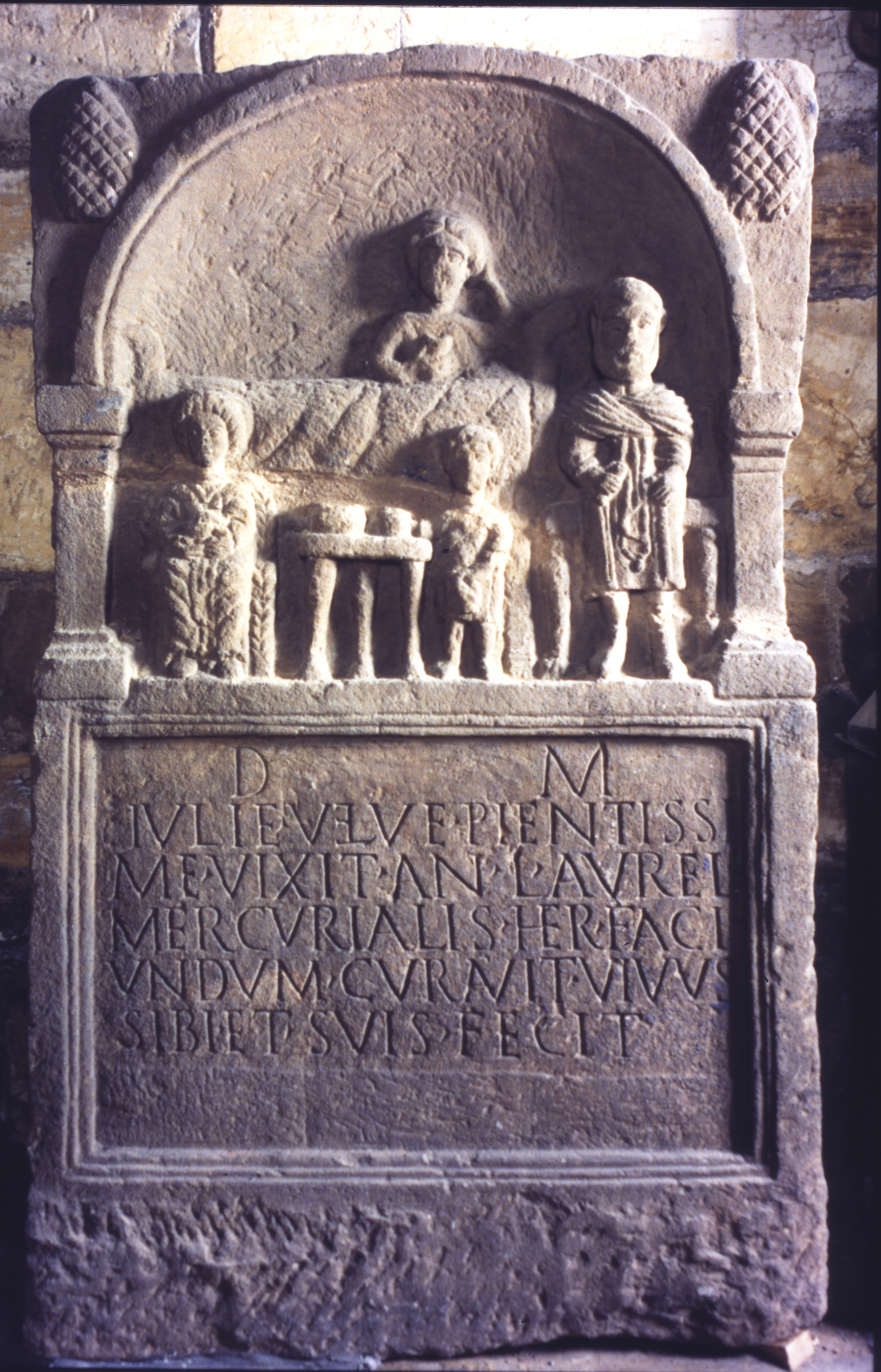
- The tombstone of Julia Velva in the collection of the Yorkshire Museum.
- Born: c.AD 160-190
- Died: c.AD 210-240; Eboracum (York, UK)

Julia Velva was a 2nd–3rd-century Roman woman known from her tombstone in York. The tomb is dated to approximately AD 210–240 and so the likely birth year of Julia was between AD 160 and 190.

== Tombstone ==
=== Discovery ===
The tombstone of Julia Velva was found at York on 11 July 1922 at a depth of 3.5 feet during the cutting of a road between The Mount and Southbank.

=== Content and interpretation ===
The tombstone depicts a feasting scene within a canopy. It measures 1.63 m high, of which 0.23 m was probably set into the ground, and is 0.99 m wide and 0.23 thick. Above the canopy is a pine-cone detail. Julia Velva reclines on a couch and holds a cup in her hand. The named heir, Aurelius Mercurialis, is standing in front of the couch. A table with a jug is in front of the couch and is attended by a servant or enslaved person. A woman sits on a wicker chair holding a bird. It would originally have been painted in bright, gaudy colours.

The Latin inscription is carved in six lines and reads: D(is) M(anibus) / Iulie Velve pientissi / me vixit an(nos) L Aurel(ius) / Mercurialis her(es) faci / undum curavit vivus /sibi et suis fecit. The translation is "To the spirits of the departed (and) of Julia Velva: she lived most dutifully 50 years. Aurelius Mercurialis, her heir, had this set up, and in his lifetime made this for himself and his family."

The imagery on the tombstone depicts a funerary feast, given in honour of Julia, hosted in a dining room or triclinium of a wealthy home. Although the feasting scene was shown in a dining room, Julia may be resting on a bed - perhaps the bed in which she died. The inclusion of pine-cones above the dining scene are a funerary reference to the god Attis who was turned into a pine tree after his death any may represent new life or new beginnings.

The inclusion of the phrase "she lived most dutifully" conforms to an ideal for Roman women to have lived and behaved in a specific way relative to her social status. It was most commonly used as a phrase on inscriptions dedicated by fathers or brothers of women. The lack of a shared name with Velva and Mercurialis (the dedicant) could be explained if she was his mother-in-law or a much loved freedwoman. Their relationship remains unclear. Her representation in a dynamic, social scene surrounded by family probably reflects an ideal of how she or her family wanted her to be remembered.

Patrick Ottaway noted that there might be meaning in the exactness of the inscription as there are 81 individual letters (ligatures counting as one), 16 words and 16 letter Is. Ottaways suggests that the square-roots of these numbers as whole numbers (9 and 4) might be a hidden attempt to use words for a hidden, almost magical purpose, in a world of poor numeracy. There are also four figures in the scene and the abbreviation of Julia Velva in Latin was IV, a visualisation of the number 4.

== Reception and display ==
The tombstone was originally loaned to the Yorkshire Museum in 1922 by the City Corporation. It is now part of the collection of the museum. In a 1924 book on Roman York, the tombstone is described as being on display in the museum.

A 2021 book by Patrick Ottaway focuses on Julia Velva and contextualises the archaeology of York and Britain at the time she was alive.

== See also ==
- Tombstone of Regina
