= Elisabeth Okasha =

Elisabeth Okasha FSA FSAS
- Born: Elisabeth Barty
- Occupations: Researcher, teacher
- Known for: Expertise in medieval inscriptions

Elisabeth Okasha (née Barty) is an expert in early medieval language and inscribed objects, and professor emerita of English language at University College Cork, where she served as Acting Director of UCC Language Centre between 2007-2019. She is a fellow of the Society of Antiquaries and the Society of Antiquaries of Scotland.

== Career ==
Okasha is recognised for her expertise in inscribed objects from the early medieval period, with her research into epigraphy spanning archaeology, history, and literature, especially Old English literature and language.

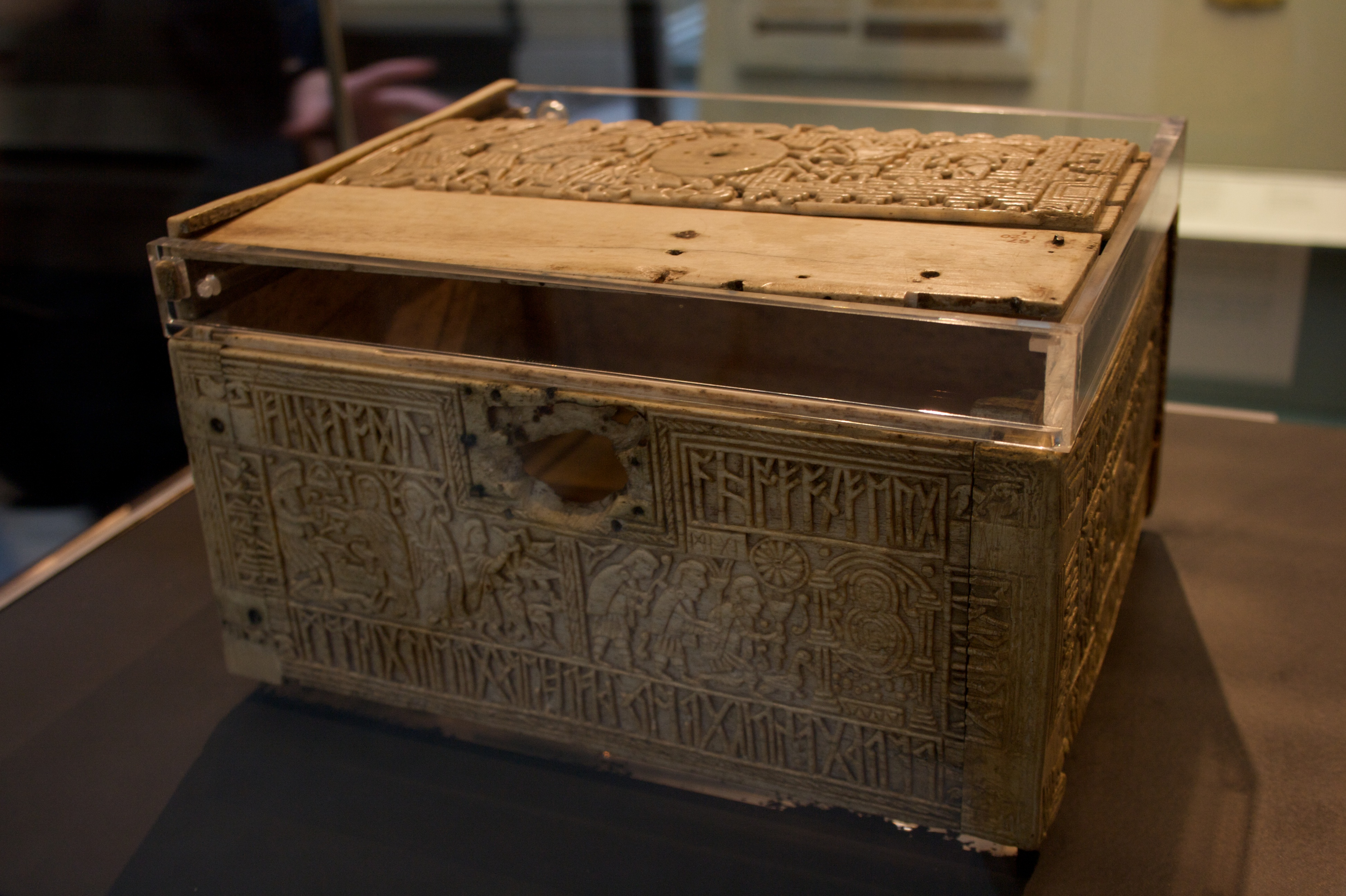
The Franks Casket on display at the British Museum.

Her Hand-List of Anglo-Saxon Non-Runic Inscriptions (1971) collated descriptions and transcriptions of 158 inscribed, or carved, objects from the early medieval England and Scotland, including jewellery, sculpture, and weapons, and notable objects including the Ruthwell Cross, Alfred Jewel, and Frank's Casket. Eight of the inscriptions had never been published before, with a reviewer noting that the work could become a 'standard reference'.

Okasha also worked on manuscript texts, publishing in 1968 the first transcription and translation of what was then called the "Leningrad Bede", now the "Saint Petersburg Bede"

In 2009, she was part of the British Museum team to examine the Staffordshire Hoard. She identified that there are 16 "accurate biblical quotations" within the Hoard's objects, with only two from the Old Testament.

She is a co-author, with Ann Preston-Jones, of the 'Cornwall' volume of the Corpus of Anglo-Saxon Stone Sculpture published in 2015, part of a long running project to document all sculpture from early medieval England edited by Rosemary Cramp. In the volume, Okasha and Preston-Jones put Cornish sculpture into context with Welsh, Irish, and other Western British examples, as well as the potential Scandinavian design influence evidenced in material culture but not present in any recorded settlements. A version of the academic volume was also published as a mass market book, which was awarded the 2022 Holyer an Gof 2022 prize for leisure and lifestyle.

Okasha taught at University of Aberdeen, University of East Anglia, Assiut University, Egypt, University of Dundee, and University College Cork. At Cork, she supported refugee and asylum-seeker students, enabling them to study English language.

== Personal life ==
Okasha was interviewed in 2012 for a St Andrews Special Collections feature, being one of eight generations of the Barty family to have attended the university. Her husband passed away in Bishoptown, Cork, Ireland, in 2024.

== Publications ==
- Elisabeth Okasha: Hand-list of Anglo-Saxon non-runic inscriptions. London: Cambridge University Press, 1971.
- Okasha, "Literacy in Anglo-Saxon England". Anglo-Saxon Studies in Archaeology and History. 8: 69–74. 1995.
- Okasha, with Leslie Webster and David Williams, "A Decorated and Inscribed Strap-End from Nuffield, Oxfordshire". The Antiquaries Journal. 101. 2001. ISSN 0003-5815.
- Okasha, with Ann Preston-Jones and Andrew Langdon, Preston Jones, Ann; Langdon, Andrew; Okasha, Elisabeth (2021). Ancient And High Crosses Of Cornwall: Cornwall's Earliest, Tallest and Finest Medieval Stone Crosses. doi:10.47788/NKIP4746. ISBN 978-1-905816-61-3.
- Elisabeth Okasha, with John Hines & Gaby Waxenberger, Hines, John; Okasha, Elisabeth; Waxenberger, Gaby (2023). "Discussion: A difficult runic inscription from King's Somborne, Hampshire". Runes:et:al. 1. doi:10.17904/ku.edoc.33409.
