= Tombstone of Regina =

Latin funerary epitaph for Romano-British woman from second century CE

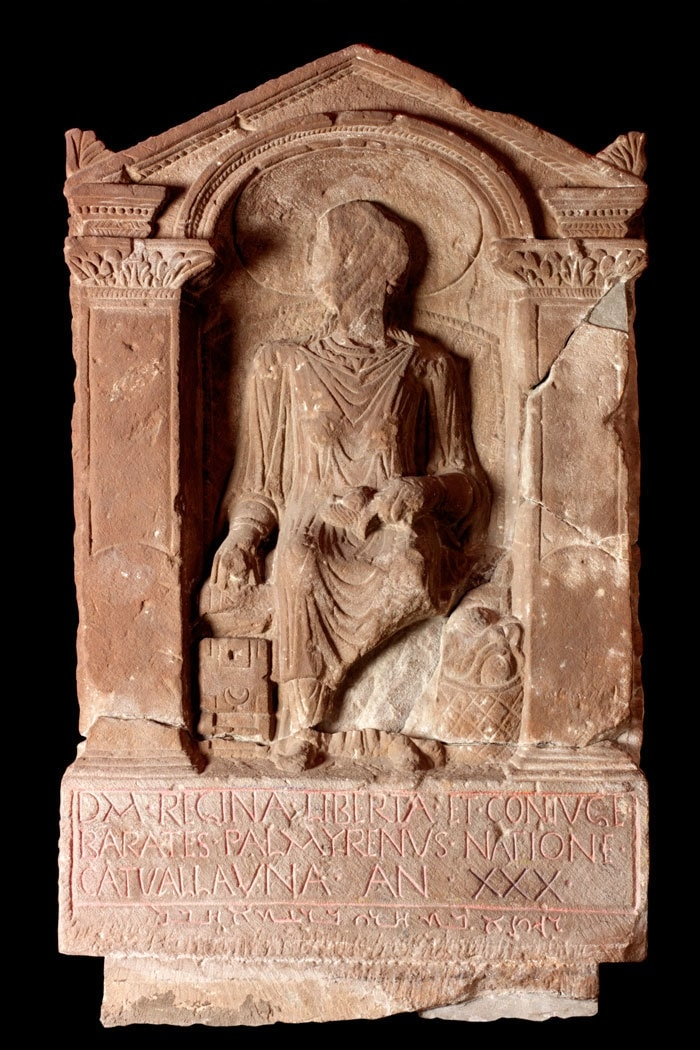
- The tombstone of Regina in the collection of Tyne and Wear Museums.
- Born: c.AD 100-200
- Died: c.AD 130-200; Arbeia (South Shields, UK)

Regina was a 2nd-century AD Romano-British freedwoman known from her tombstone at Arbeia (South Shields), United Kingdom, which contains a rare Palmyrene inscription. The historical and linguistic qualities of the commemoration, along with its emotional appeal, have made Regina second only to Boudica in fame among women of Roman Britain.

== Biography ==
Regina was either born into slavery or entered slavery in her youth. She is identified as a member of the Catuvellauni tribe in what is now called the East of England. She was married to a merchant from Palmyra named Barates and died aged 30 at South Shields.

== Tombstone ==
=== Discovery ===
The tombstone was discovered in Bath Street, South Shields, in 1878. The discovery, noted by the Shields Daily gazette was reported in the magazine The Academy on 2 November 1878.. A follow up on 9 November 1878 by William Wright makes the first translation of the Palmyrene inscription on the tombstone. It was subsequently reported in the British Archaeological Association journal by Walter de Gray Birch in 1878.

=== Iconography ===
The tombstone measures 1.118 metres (3.67 ft) x 0.711 metres (2.33 ft). Regina is shown sitting in a wicker chair within a gabled niche flanked by two pilasters. She wears a robe over her floor-length tunic. Although her face is now missing, she is shown to wear a large necklace and bracelets. In her hands she holds a distaff and spindle for spinning wool. At her sides are a basket of wool and a jewellery box. The carving is particularly fine for Roman Britain: Maureen Carroll said that it "stands out in the quality of its design and execution".

=== Inscription ===
There are two inscriptions. The main, Latin, inscription is carved over three lines. Beneath it is a single line in Palmyrene Aramaic:

DM‣REGINA‣LIBERTA‣ET‣CONIVGE‣

BARATES‣PALMYRENVS‣NATIONE‣

CATVALLAVNA‣AN‣XXX‣

𐡴𐡢𐡩𐡮𐡠 𐡡𐡶 𐡧𐡴𐡩 𐡡𐡴 𐡰𐡶𐡠 𐡧𐡡𐡫

[RGYNᵓ BT ḤRY BR ᶜTᵓ ḤBL]^{note 1}

The Latin text translates to: "To the spirits of the departed (and to) Regina, his freedwoman and wife, a Catuvellaunian by tribe, aged 30, Barates of Palmyra (set this up)" followed by the Palmyrene section: "Regina, the freedwoman of Barates, alas". The sculptor of the Latin text may have been bilingual or less-comfortable with carving in Latin as they mis-spelled Regina’s tribal affiliation ('Catvullavna' rather than 'Catuvellauna') and tried to correct it.

The use of the word 'alas' in the final line of the inscription hints at the grief felt by Barates to the loss of his wife, whom he had probably freed at some point in her life. This phrase, and the fact that he created a large commemoration stone both hints that he thought of his relationship as a happy one and that he wished to promote his own wealth and status. Neither Regina nor Barates were Roman citizens based on their use of a single name, and so their marriage may not have been recognised under Roman law, but the use of the word coniunx ("wife") suggests that they considered themselves as lawfully married. The name Regina translates as 'Queen' - this might have been her enslaved name or a new name taken upon her manumission.

The Palmyrene inscription is known as CIS II 3901 and NE 482 d.γ5.

== Public display ==
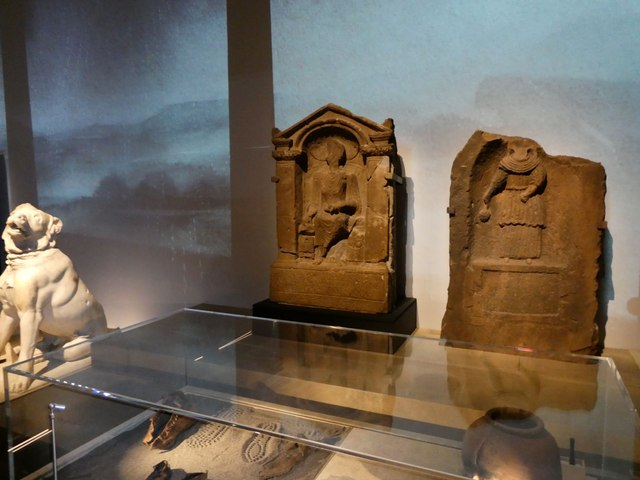
The tombstone (left) on display in the 'Legion' Exhibition at the British Museum in 2024

In 2024 the tombstone was sent on loan the 'Legion' exhibition at the British Museum. As of 2026 Regina's tombstone was on display in the 'Set in Stone' gallery at Arbeia Roman Fort.

== Reception ==
The tombstone has been covered and responded to in various media:

- A copy of the tombstone is in the collection of the British Museum.
- A 2013 iPad app titled 'The Mystery of Regina's Tombstone' was released by Braunarts and promoted by Mary Beard.
- In 2018 Regina's tombstone was noted as one of the 12 "Amazing Treasures" of the 'Civilisations Stories', a series of videos in support of the BBC Civilisations programming.
- A 2026 Country Life article included the Regina tombstone as the first item in an article highlighting what tourists should see in the North-East if they "want to learn more about the artistic history of [the] country".

== See also ==
- Claudia Aster inscription
- Julia Velva

== Notes ==
- ^note 1 This is the Palmyrene text transliterated into Latin lettering.
