= Acme (enslaved woman) =

Jewish slave and personal maid in the service of the Empress Livia Drusilla

- Died: 5 BC

Acme (Greek: Ἁκμή, romanized: Akmē, died 5 BC) was a Jewish slave and personal maid in the service of the Empress Livia Drusilla, wife of Caesar Augustus.

== Biography ==
Little is known about Acme's early life, other than she was a slave in the service of Empress Livia. She comes to prominence later in life when she was embroiled in a family conflict between Herod the Great and his son Antipater, which took place during the final nine years of Herod's life. Whilst Antipater was living in Rome, he recruited Acme to forge letters from Salome, his aunt and Herod's sister, to Empress Livia.

Acme's part in the conspiracy was discovered when a letter between Antipater and Acme was intercepted. This letter described a plan to forge incriminating letters which would lead to the execution of Salome by Herod. The purpose of the letters was to make Herod believe that Salome was conspiring against him by writing to important people in Rome.

Herod denounced the events to Emperor Augustus and, as a result, Acme was executed in 5 BC. Her death was reported to Herod by Caesar in a letter. After her death, Augustus allowed Herod to decide on the fate of Antipater; on returning to Judea, he executed his son immediately, five days before his own death.

== Historiography ==
The story of Acme's role in the Herod's family feud is related by Titus Flavius Josephus in The Antiquities of the Jews and in The War of the Jews. However, there are discrepancies between how the story is related between the texts. The execution of Acme is also used as evidence to date Herod's death more closely.

== See also ==
- Claudia Aster
- Slavery in ancient Rome
