= Tania Dickinson =

British archaeologist (born 1946)

Tania Dickinson FSA
- Born: 1946 (age 79–80)

Academic background
- Education: Institute of Archaeology
- Thesis: The Anglo-Saxon burial sites of the upper Thames region (1976)
- Doctoral advisor: Christopher Hawkes; Sonia Chadwick Hawkes

Academic work
- Discipline: Archaeology
- Sub-discipline: Early-medieval archaeology
- Institutions: University College, Cardiff; University of York
- Doctoral students: Patrick Ottaway

Tania Marguerite Dickinson FSA (born 1946) is a British archaeologist specialising in early-medieval Britain. Dickinson undertook undergraduate study at St. Anne's College, Oxford and postgraduate study at the Institute of Archaeology (Oxford). Her doctoral thesis, titled The Anglo-Saxon burial sites of the upper Thames region, and their bearing on the history of Wessex, circa AD 400-700, was supervised by Sonia Chadwick Hawkes and Christopher Hawkes (for the first year).

In 1973 she was appointed Lecturer in Archaeology at University College, Cardiff before moving to the University York as a lecturer in 1979. She remained at York until her retirement in 2011. Dickinson was one of the lead researchers on, and chair of, the Staffordshire Hoard Research Project (2014-2015). The final report for the project was published in September 2019.

== Select publications ==
- Dickinson, Tania M. & Speake, George (1992). "The Seventh-Century Cremation Burial in Asthall Barrow, Oxfordshire: A Reassessment" (PDF). In Carver, Martin (ed.). The Age of Sutton Hoo: The seventh century in north-western Europe. Woodbridge: The Boydell Press. pp. 95–130. ISBN 0-85115-330-5. Archived from the original (PDF) on 12 May 2019.
- 1993. 'Early Saxon saucer brooches: a preliminary overview', in W. Filmer‑Sankey (ed.), Anglo‑Saxon Studies in Archaeology and History 6, 11–44.
- 2005. 'Symbols of protection: the significance of animal-ornamented shields in Early Anglo-Saxon England', Medieval Archaeology 49, 109–163.
- 2011. 'Overview: mortuary ritual', in H. Hamerow, D. Hinton and S. Crawford (eds.), The Oxford Handbook of Anglo-Saxon Archaeology. Oxford, Oxford University Press.pp221–237.
- 2014. 'Jewellery', in M. Lapidge, J. Blair, S. Keynes and D. Scragg (eds.), The Wiley Blackwell Encyclopaedia of Anglo-Saxon England, Chichester, John Wiley & Sons. pp263–267.
- 2019. Editor, with Chris Fern and Leslie Webster. The Staffordshire Hoard: An Anglo-Saxon Treasure. London, Society of Antiquaries of London.
