= Vera Evison =

British archaeologist (1918–2018)

Vera Evison FSA
- Born: 23 January 1918; Lewisham, London, UK
- Died: 18 March 2018 (aged 100)
- Occupation: Archaeologist

Academic work
- Discipline: Archaeology
- Notable students: Sonia Chadwick Hawkes

Vera Ivy Evison FSA (23 January 1918 – 18 March 2018) was a British archaeologist and academic, who specialed in Post-Roman Britain and early-Medieval England. She was Professor of Archaeology at Birkbeck College, University of London.

== Career ==
Evison attended Lewisham Prendergast school until 1937, following this with a series of evening classes, in subject including archaeology, before studying BA English language and literature. Her studies were supported by working as a secretary for Kathleen Kenyon at the London University Institute of Archaeology. In 1947 she went to study archaeology in Stockholm under Nils Åberg. She also worked as a volunteer assistant at the British Museum, helping to unpack Anglo-Saxon objects (including grave goods from Sutton Hoo), once they were returned to the galleries after the Second World War.

She joined Birkbeck as a part-time lecturer in 1947, rising to professor in 1979 and retiring in 1983.

Evison also worked for the Ancient Monuments Inspectorate (for the Ministry of Works) excavating sites prior to their destruction. Through this she brought six Anglo-Saxon cemeteries to publication: Buckland (Dover); Great Chesterford (Essex); Holborough Hill (Kent); two at Beckford (Herefordshire); and Alton (Hampshire).

She was elected as Fellow of the Society of Antiquaries of London in May 1955.

== Select publications ==
- 1957. "A group of late Saxon brooches", The Antiquaries Journal 37 (3–4). 220–222.
- 1963. "Sugar-loaf shield bosses", The Antiquaries Journal 43(1). 38–69.
- 1966. "A Bronze Mount from the Roman Villa at Lullingstone, Kent", The Antiquaries Journal 46(1). 85–87.
- 1979. A corpus of wheel-thrown pottery in Anglo-Saxon graves
- 1996. (with Hill, P.). Two Anglo-Saxon cemeteries at Beckford, Hereford and Worcester CBA Research Reports 103. ISBN 978-1-872414-69-0.
- 2008. Catalogue of Anglo-Saxon Glass in the British Museum. ISBN 978-0-86159-167-1.
