= Sonia Chadwick Hawkes =

English archaeologist

Sonia Chadwick Hawkes FSA
- Born: Sonia Elizabeth Chadwick; 5 November 1933; Crayford, Kent, England
- Died: 30 May 1999 (aged 65); Oxford, England
- Occupations: Archaeologist; Curator; Lecturer
- Spouses: Christopher Hawkes (m. 1959; died 1992); Svetislav Petkovic (m. 1995)

Academic background
- Education: Bedford College, University of London
- Academic advisor: Vera Evison

Academic work
- Discipline: Archaeology
- Sub-discipline: Anglo-Saxon archaeology
- Institutions: Scunthorpe Museum (1958–59); University of Oxford (Institute of Archaeology) (1959–94)
- Doctoral students: Tania Dickinson; George Speake
- Notable students: Helena Hamerow; Ruth Mazo Karras

Sonia Chadwick Hawkes FSA (5 November 1933 – 30 May 1999) was a British archaeologist specialising in early Anglo-Saxon archaeology. She led excavations on Anglo-Saxon cemeteries at Finglesham in Kent and Worthy Park in Hampshire. Fellow medieval archaeologist Paul Ashbee described her as a "discerning systematiser of the great array of Anglo-Saxon grave furnishings". Hawkes worked at the Scunthorpe Museum and the University of Oxford. She co-founded the monograph series Anglo-Saxon Studies in Archaeology and History.

== Biography ==
=== Early life ===
Born Sonia Elizabeth Chadwick, on 5 November 1933 in Crayford, she was the only child of Albert Andrew Chadwick and Doris Chadwick (formerly Doris Benger). The Oxford Dictionary of National Biography notes that Albert Andrew Chadwick was an engineer, but gives no information on Doris Chadwick beyond her name.

Sonia Chadwick excavated at Lullingstone Roman Villa, Kent, as a school girl, and at an early medieval site at Morgan Porth Cornwall, from 1951 to 1953. The experience at Morgan Porth shaped her later interest in early medieval archaeology. She studied English at Bedford College, University of London, before undertaking postgraduate research supervised by Vera I. Evison.

=== Career ===
In 1956, Chadwick began a multi-year excavation at a prehistoric site on Longbridge Deverill Cow Down in Wiltshire. The work was carried out for the Ministry of Works and concluded in 1960.

Chadwick contributed to the inaugural volume of Medieval Archaeology in 1957, published by the recently established Society for Medieval Archaeology, editing a posthumous article on the early medieval art of the Jutes from Anglo-Saxonist Edward Thurlow Leeds. Chadwick's early research explored the decorated metalwork found in early medieval graves. She produced a study reassessing 1920s finds from the Anglo-Saxon cemetery at Finglesham, a prelude to her own excavations there from 1959. The field of Anglo-Saxon archaeology developed significantly in the early 20th century with systematic approaches to data; Hawkes was part of a wave of archaeologists including J. N. L. Myres, Vera I. Evison, and Audrey Meaney who continued this trend, investigating cemeteries to explore the history of England in the early Middle Ages.

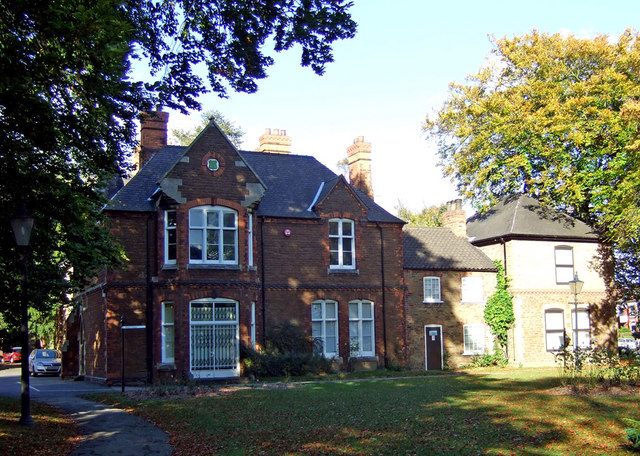
Sonia Chadwick worked at the Scunthorpe Museum (later renamed the North Lincolnshire Museum) from 1958 to 1959 as a curator.

In 1958, she was appointed curator of Scunthorpe Museum. The museum took over excavations at an Anglian cemetery in Fonaby, Lincolnshire; Chadwick was responsible for the finds and began indexing them – a project which was built on by Alison M. Cook and the finished product published more than two decades later.

Chadwick spoke about the work at Longbridge Deverill at the "Problems relating to the Iron Age in Southern Britain" conference in December that year, organised by the Council for British Archaeology at the Institute of Archaeology in Oxford. Chadwick met fellow archaeologist Christopher Hawkes at the conference and they married in January 1959. She left Scunthorpe Museum in 1959 to join the Institute of Archaeology at the University of Oxford, where Christopher lectured, as a research assistant. She remained with the Institute, later becoming a lecturer, until she retired in 1994. Christopher joined Sonia at Longbridge Deverill for the final season of excavation in 1960, which Paul Ashbee described as a "honeymoon joint enterprise".

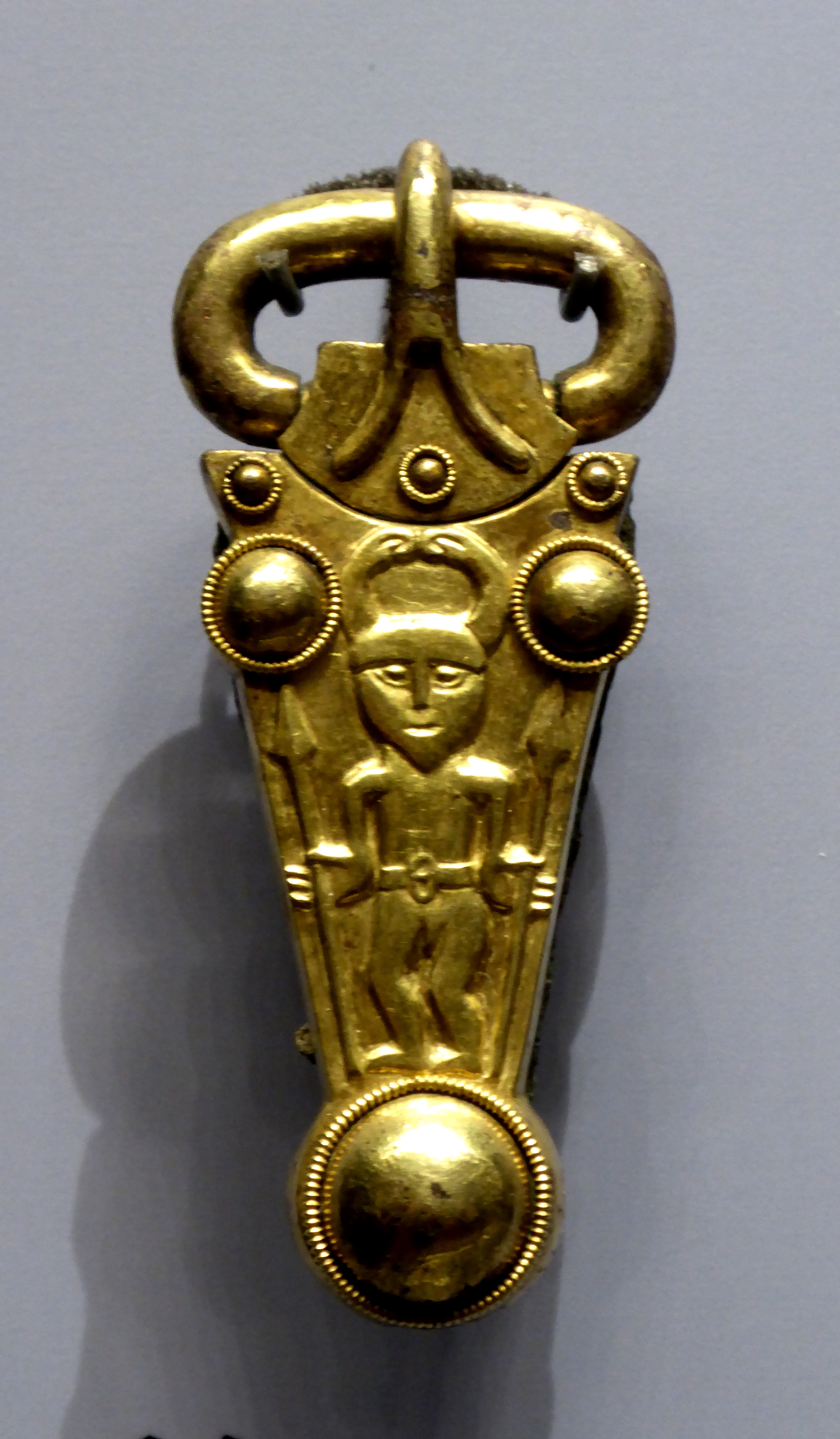
In 1964, Sonia Chadwick Hawkes discovered a gold buckle decorated with a figure dubbed the Finglesham Man. The buckle is on display in the Ashmolean Museum.

From 1959 to 1967, Hawkes led excavations at Finglesham Anglo-Saxon cemetery in Kent. Hawkes was elected a Fellow of the Society of Antiquaries (FSA) in 1961. Between 1961 and 1962, she also led excavations at an Anglo-Saxon cemetery at Worthy Park in Hampshire. From 1963 to 1971, Hawkes catalogued a collection of finds from the 18th-century antiquarian Bryan Faussett.

Hawkes' research focus was on Anglo Saxon cemeteries in Kent. A major piece of work on Late Roman zoomorphic belt fittings, "Soldiers and settlers", prompted much debate. Written in collaboration with Gerald Dunning, the paper was also translated into German. In the 1960s, Hawkes began a reassessment of material excavated at the early medieval cemeteries at Sarre and Bifrons in the 19th century. The results were not published in her lifetime.

In 1973, Hawkes was appointed lecturer in European archaeology at the University of Oxford. Updown early medieval cemetery in Kent was discovered that year, about a mile from the Finglesham cemetery. Hawkes became interested in the site due to its proximity to Finglesham where she had already worked; she worked with the owners and they commissioned her to conduct a rescue excavation in 1976 ahead of the East Kent Water Board's plans to run a pipeline through the site. The work uncovered 36 graves, but further excavation was curtailed after one of the landowners died, and Hawkes spent time publishing the results of the excavation.

The 1970s saw an increasing number of studies in the field of Anglo-Saxon archaeology; in the context of creating new venues for publication of detailed studies, Hawkes supported the foundation of the British Archaeological Reports book series. She had an advisory editorial role and the first book in the series was written by one of Hawkes' research students, Tania Dickinson. In 1979, she co-founded the publication series Anglo-Saxon Studies in Archaeology and History with James Campbell and David Brown, and organised a series of interdisciplinary seminars and conferences in Anglo Saxon studies. The first two volumes of Anglo-Saxon Studies in Archaeology and History were published in the British Archaeological Reports book series.

Sonia collaborated with her husband, Christopher Hawkes, as a researcher and they co-edited Greeks, Celts and Romans and Christopher contributed a section to Sonia's article on the Finglesham Man. They translated into English and printed Joachim Werner's 1982 article on the excavation and publication of the Sutton Hoo ship burial. Christopher's health began declining in the 1980s, and around this time Sonia and he spent time travelling in Europe. As Christopher's health worsened, Sonia spent more time caring for him and less time on research. After his death in 1992, Sonia "was tireless in ... ordering his books and papers".

Hawkes took early retirement in 1994. She married Svetislav Petkovic in May 1995, a retired factory inspector. Sonia Petkovic died in Oxford on 30 May 1999, having been diagnosed with cancer.

== Reception and legacy ==
At the time of her death, Hawkes had several unpublished projects, including a full write-up of the excavations at the early medieval cemetery at Finglesham. The Sonia Hawkes Archive, containing notes on unpublished excavations, was established at the University of Oxford. Helena Hamerow, a professor of medieval archaeology and a former student of Hawkes, led a project to digitise the archive with funding from the Arts and Humanities Research Council and the Römisch-Germanische Kommission. A number of Hawkes' works were bought to publication posthumously.

In December 2001, the Institute of Archaeology dedicated a plaque and a 1937 lithograph by Paul Nash, Landscape of the Megaliths, to the memory of Christopher and Sonia Hawkes. An edited volume was published in her honour in 2007, edited by Martin Henig and Tyler Jo Smith.

== Selected publications ==
The editors of the 2007 book dedicated to Hawkes noted that there is no comprehensive list of her publications.

=== Books ===
- Hawkes, S. C., Grainger, G. (2006). The Anglo-Saxon Cemetery at Finglesham, Kent. Oxford: Oxford University School of Archaeology.
- Hawkes, S. C., Grainger, G., Biddulph, E., and Dodd, A. (2003). The Anglo-Saxon cemetery at Worthy Park, Kingsworthy, Hampshire. Oxford: Oxbow.
- Hawkes, S. C. (2000). The Anglo-Saxon cemetery of Bifrons, in the parish of Patrixbourne, East Kent. Anglo-Saxon Stud Archaeol Hist 11: 1–94.
- Hawkes, S. C. (ed.) (1989). Weapons and Warfare in Anglo-Saxon England. Oxford: Oxford University Committee for Archaeology.
- Hawkes, C. F. C. and Hawkes, S. C. (eds.) (1973). Greeks, Celts and Romans. London: Dent.

=== Articles ===
- Hawkes, S. C. (1974). The Monkton Brooch. The Antiquaries Journal 54(2): 245–256. doi:10.1017/S0003581500042475
- Hawkes, S. C. (1969). "Finds from two Middle Bronze Age pits at Winnall, Winchester, Hampshire." Proceedings of the Hampshire Field Club and Archaeological Society 26: 5–18.
- Hawkes, S. C. and Page, R. I. (1967). Swords and runes in south-east England. The Antiquaries Journal 47 (1): 1–26. doi:10.1017/S000358150001341X
- Hawkes, S. C.; Dunning, G. C. (1961), "Soldiers and Settlers in Britain, Fourth to Fifth Century: With a Catalogue of Animal-Ornamented Buckles and Related Belt-Fittings", Medieval Archaeology, 5: 1–70, doi:10.1080/00766097.1961.11735646
- Chadwick, S. E. (1958), "The Anglo-Saxon Cemetery at Finglesham, Kent: a Reconsideration", Medieval Archaeology, 2: 1–71, doi:10.5284/1071329
