= Patrick Ottaway =

English archaeologist

- Education: University of Oxford; University of Leeds; University of York
- Scientific career
- Thesis: Anglo-Scandinavian ironwork from 16-22 Coppergate, York: c.850-1100 A.D. (1990)
- Doctoral advisor: Tania Dickinson and Stephen Roskams

Patrick Ottaway is an English archaeologist and author.

== Early life ==
Ottaway graduated from Oxford University, before undertaking a masters of economic history at Leeds University. He received a Doctorate of Philosophy in archaeology from the University of York in 1990; his thesis was titled 'Anglo-Scandinavian ironwork from 16-22 Coppergate, York : c.850-1100 A.D.' and was supervised by Tania Dickinson and Steve Roskams.

== Career ==
Ottaway began his career in Winchester, Hampshire, where he was the assistant city archaeologist between 1976 and 1981.

He became a senior project manager overseeing excavations in York. Until 2006, he was head of fieldwork at York Archaeological Trust.

Ottaway was honorary editor of The Archaeological Journal between 2007 and 2012. Between 2010 and 2018, he was chairman of the York Archaeological Forum, working with City of York Council on its archaeological and historical environment policies. He was chairman of the Council for British Archaeology Yorkshire Group between 1997 and 2001.

He is a Fellow of the Society of Antiquaries of London and a member of the Chartered Institute for Archaeologists.

Ottaway has appeared in the British archaeology programme Time Team and the BBC's Timewatch episode titled "The Mystery of the Headless Roman". In 2023, he appeared in the PBS series Secrets of the Dead, in the episode "Headless Romans".

In 1996, he published Romans on the Yorkshire Coast. Three years later, in collaboration with fellow archaeologist Richard Hall, he published 2000 Years of York. In 2018, his book Winchester: An Archaeological Assessment was reviewed by Current Archaeology.

As of 2024, Ottway is manager of PJO Archaeology in York.

== Selected works ==
Some of the works authored by Ottaway:

- Archaeology in British Towns (1992)
- Romans on the Yorkshire Coast (1996)
- 2000 Years of York (with Richard Hall; 1999)
- Winchester: An Archaeological Assessment (2018)
- Julia Velva: A Roman Lady from York (2021)
