= Claudia Aster inscription =

1st century CE Latin funerary epitaph

- L'iscrizione di Claudia Aster Hierosolymitana
- Type: Cippus, funerary inscription
- Material: marble
- Writing: Latin
- Created: 70–95 AD, probably Puteoli
- Discovered: 1761; Fuorigrotta, Campania, Italy
- Classification: Funerary epitaph
- Identification: CIJ I² 646; JIWE I 28; CIJud 6467
- Culture: Jewish diaspora in Roman Italy

A Latin funerary inscription from Campania, Italy, dated to the late first century AD, commemorates a 25-year-old woman named Claudia Aster. She was a captive from Jerusalem, probably Jewish, who reached Roman Italy as a slave, probably in the aftermath of the city's siege by Titus during the First Jewish–Roman War. The inscription was discovered in Fuorigrotta in 1761.

== Discovery ==
The item's findspot is known from an 18th-century report preserved by Michele Ruggiero in his collection of documents on antiquities from the Kingdom of Naples. A record signed by Sergeant Carlo Giorgi states that it was discovered in 1761 near Fuorigrotta, then a village west of Naples (now suburb of the city), on a rural property with a farmstead belonging to a man named Francesco Grillo, toward Bagnoli and Pozzuoli.

Giancarlo Lacerenza, a scholar of Jewish history and a specialist in epigraphy, writes that in classical antiquity this area was crossed by branches of the road between Naples and Pozzuoli (then known as Neapolis and Puteoli), where stopping points and large burial areas developed over time. Because the district had been transferred by the first century AD, no later than the reign of Vespasian, from the territory of Neapolis to that of Puteoli, he concludes that the inscription should be assigned to the territory of Puteoli rather than to Neapolis proper. He suggests that its most likely original setting was a funerary complex along the road branch between the exit of the Grotta di Seiano and Fuorigrotta, near modern Via Campegna.

The inscription was held, as of 1999, in the National Archaeological Museum, Naples, where it is catalogued as inventory no. 4368. As of 2021, it is part of the collection of the Museum of Italian Judaism and the Shoah in Ferrara, and on loan to the National Archaeological Museum in Naples.

== Description ==
The inscription is carved on a small travertine funerary stone (cippus), now heavily darkened, measuring 65 × 35 × 9 cm. The inscribed panel measures 41 × 33 cm, and the letters are approximately 2.5–3 cm high; no guide lines are visible. The front face preserves nine lines of Latin text, though the beginnings of the lines are damaged because a fracture runs along the entire left side of the stone. A horizontal line separates the inscribed panel from a lower section that was originally left blank and was probably intended to be set partly into the ground.

The inscription is difficult to read because many of its letter forms are ambiguous, especially after the first few lines, and the damage along the left edge has removed the opening letters of every line. These factors have contributed to the absence of a universally accepted reading of the text.

== Text ==
On the basis of his own direct examination of the stone under varying lighting conditions, Giancarlo Lacerenza republished the inscription in 1999 as follows:

=== Latin text ===
1. [CL]AVDIA·ASTER
2. [HI]EROSOLYMITANA
3. [CA]PTIVA·CVRAM EGIT
4. [TI.]CLAVDIVS AVG·LIBERTVS
5. [PRO?]CVLVS·ROGO VOS·FAC
6. [ITE]·PER·LEGEM NE QVIS
7. [MI]HI TITVLVM DEICIAT CV
8. [RA]M AGATIS VIXIT ANNIS
9. XXV

=== Transliteration ===
[Cl]audia Aster [Hi]erosolymitana [ca]ptiva curam egit [Ti(berius)] Claudius Aug(usti) libertus [Pro?]culus. Rogo vos facite per legem ne quis [mi]hi titulum deiciat; cu[ra]m agatis. Vixit annis XXV.

=== Translation ===
For Claudia Aster, of Jerusalem, a captive. [Set up] by Tiberius Claudius [Pro?]culus, an imperial freedman. I ask you: act in accordance with the law, so that no one may remove my inscription; take care of it. She lived 25 years.

=== Discussion ===
The inscription was first published by the classical scholar Theodor Mommsen in the 19th century (as IRNL 6467). It was also included in early publications by art historian Raffaele Garrucci, and was later discussed by archaeologist Giovanni Battista de Rossi and C. Giorgi before being re-edited on the basis of direct examination by Giancarlo Lacerenza in 1999.

Giancarlo Lacerenza accepted Claudia and Hierosolymitana as secure restorations, while noting that captiva is not entirely certain because the crucial letter is damaged.

==== The patron's cognomen ====
The reconstruction of the patron's cognomen has been disputed. Theodor Mommsen initially restored the name as Arescusus, later revising it to Masculus, which subsequently became the most commonly accepted reconstruction. Philologists Heikki Solin and Olli Salomies noted, however, that although Proculus is the most likely option, there are numerous possible restorations, as there are 53 names ending in -culus attested in the Roman onomasticon. Lacerenza likewise preferred Proculus as a more plausible, though still uncertain, reconstruction.

==== Legal clause ====
In the legal clause, Theodor Mommsen had restored the text as fac(ite) praeter legem, but Lacerenza argued instead for a reading with per legem, while noting that the apparent form legim should be corrected to leg<e>m, probably resulting from a stonecutter's error rather than a meaningful alternative spelling. He regarded the readings mihi, titulum deiciat, and curam agatis as secure, rejecting earlier proposals such as Mommsen's efficiat, which was later revived by David Noy.

== Analysis ==
The inscription indicates that Claudia Aster was a Jerusalemite and, in all probability, Jewish. The exact date of her removal from Jerusalem cannot be established, though it likely followed the Roman siege of the city in 70 AD. She is believed to have been enslaved at a young age. If she was captured as an infant, the inscription would date no later than 95 AD. The name Aster is thought to derive from Esther, the biblical Jewish queen of Persia who is the main figure in the Book of Esther and the story of Purim. This would make it one of the earliest attestations of the name.

Aster was purchased and manumitted by the imperial freedman Ti. Claudius [Pro]culus, whose gentilicium she then adopted. Some earlier scholars interpreted Claudia Aster and Ti. Claudius [Pro]culus as husband and wife. This interpretation has received support from scholars such as David Noy, who writes that the fact that Claudia Aster had been below the legally defined minimum age for manumission under the Lex Aelia Sentia, with marriage constituting one of the exceptions permitting such an act. Lacerenza regarded this as unlikely because the inscription contains no indication that she was his wife. Instead, he suggested that the relationship may have been one of concubinage. Historian and jurist Jean Juster proposed that Ti. Claudius [Pro]culus was himself Jewish and arranged Claudia Aster's burial in fulfillment of a communal obligation toward a fellow Jew (rather than in a purely personal capacity). Other scholars noted that the inscription itself provides no evidence sufficient to establish his Jewish identity.

Scholars have also debated whether the inscription's appeal to lex refers to the Torah (Pentateuch) or to Roman funerary law. Since "law" (as in the "Law of Moses") was a common Jewish designation for the Torah and appears in that sense in other Jewish epitaphs, some scholars have compared the phrase with Jewish inscriptions (such as the 4th-century AD inscription of Aurelius Samohil from Catania) in which lex or nomos (Greek) explicitly denotes Mosaic Law. Other scholars, including Jean Juster, interpreted the clause instead as an appeal to Roman law governing the protection of tombs, an interpretation some later scholars have also considered more likely if the inscription originally stood outside a Jewish burial setting. Because the Claudia Aster inscription does not specify which law is intended, the issue remains unresolved.

== In popular culture ==
- Claudia Aster is the central figure in Rebel Daughter, a 2021 historical fiction novel by Lori Banov Kaufmann, which received the National Jewish Book Award.

== See also ==
- First Jewish–Roman War#Aftermath
- History of the Jews in Italy
- Jewish diaspora
- Acme (enslaved woman)
- Tombstone of Regina
- Slavery in ancient Rome

== Bibliography ==
=== Sources ===
- Kaufmann, Lori Banov (2021). "Rebel Daughter". Penguin Books New Zealand. Penguin Random House.
- Lacerenza, Giancarlo (1999). "L'iscrizione di Claudia Aster Hierosolymitana". In Cagnin, Luigi (ed.). Biblica et Semitica: Studi in memoria di Francesco Vattioni. Istituto Universitario Orientale, Dipartimento di Studi Asiatici, Serie Minore (in Italian). Vol. LIX. Napoli. pp. 303–313.
- Noy, David (1993). Jewish Inscriptions of Western Europe. Volume I, Italy (excluding the City of Rome), Spain and Gaul. Cambridge: Cambridge University Press. pp. 43–45. ISBN 0-521-61977-7.
- Price, Jonathan (2011). "The Jewish Population of Jerusalem from the First Century BCE to the Early Second Century CE: The Epigraphic Record". In Popović, Mladen (ed.). The Jewish Revolt against Rome: Interdisciplinary Perspectives. Brill. pp. 399–418. doi:10.1163/9789004216693_017. ISBN 978-9-004-21668-6.
- Rocca, Samuele (2022). In the Shadow of the Caesars: Jewish Life in Roman Italy. The Brill Reference Library of Judaism. Vol. 74. Brill. ISBN 978-9-004-51704-2.
- Schneider, Emily (2021). "Rebel Daughter". Jewish Book Council.
