= Pieta Greaves =

British archaeologist (1979–2025)

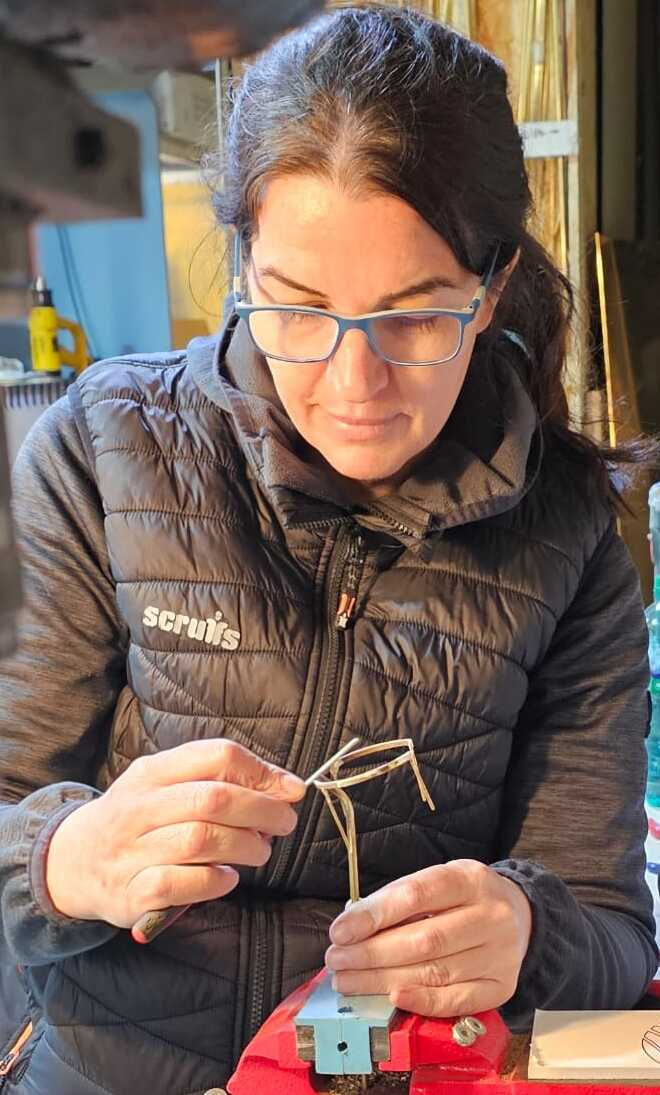
- Greaves in 2025
- Born: 10 March 1979
- Died: 20 April 2025 (aged 46)

Academic background
- Education: University of Auckland (BA); Cardiff University (BSc)
- Alma mater: University of Edinburgh (MSc)

Academic work
- Discipline: Conservation of artefacts Archaeology

Pieta Greaves (10 March 1979 – 20 April 2025) was a New Zealand born British archaeologist and conservator known for her work on the Staffordshire Hoard and her contributions to heritage conservation in the United Kingdom and internationally.

== Background ==
Greaves was born on 10 March 1979. She undertook a BA in anthropology, geography and ancient history at the University of Auckland (2001), then going on to earn a BSc in Conservation of Objects in Museums and archaeology (2007) at Cardiff University. She completed a M.Sc. in architectural conservation in 2013 at Edinburgh College of Art. Greaves died on 20 April 2025, at the age of 46.

== Career ==
Greaves was an established conservator, having worked on and led a multitude of conservation projects. During her career she had considerable experience with on-site work, collections within historic buildings, churches, museums, outdoor monuments and public art, working in the UK and abroad.

Greaves served as a senior conservator at AOC Archaeology, working on the conservation of a tenth-century Viking boat burial discovered in 2011 at Swordle Bay, Ardnamurchan, Scotland.

One of the most high-profile projects for which Greaves was responsible was the Staffordshire Hoard, where she was Conservation Coordinator, responsible for delivering the conservation program, ongoing public engagement, and gallery installations. Greaves' work with the hoard also contributed to a range of research and knowledge creation about the Anglo-Saxon past and under her leadership the hoard conservation team won the Pilgrim Trust Award for Conservation (2015 Icon Awards) and the Archaeological Institute of America Conservation Management Award (2014).

In 2016, Greaves established "Drakon Heritage and Conservation" with Jenni Butterworth, providing a range of services in archaeology, project management and in Greaves' case, in object conservation treatments.

== Publications ==
=== Author ===
1. Greaves, P (2025). My Archaeology, reflections on a career in archaeology and conservation. British Archaeology, 201, 52–53

=== Co-author ===
1. Butterworth, J., Fregni, G., Fuller, K., & Greaves, P. (2016). The importance of multidisciplinary work within archaeological conservation projects: assembly of the Staffordshire Hoard die-impressed sheets. Journal of the Institute of Conservation, 39(1), 29-43.
2. Helmke, C., Hammond, G., Guderjan, T., Greaves, P., & Hanratty, C. (2019). Sighting a Royal Vehicle: Observations on the Graffiti of Tulix Mul, Belize. The PARI Journal, 19, 10-30.
3. Greaves, P., & Guderjan, T. (2012). Excavations at Bedrock 2011. The 20th annual report of the Blue Creek Archaeological Project, 29-40.

=== Contributions to archaeological reports and publications ===
1. Fern, C., Dickinson, T., & Webster, L. (2019). The Staffordshire Hoard. An Anglo-Saxon Treasure. Society of Antiquaries of London.
2. Williams, H., Clague, S., & Reavill, P. (Eds.). (2022). The Staffordshire Hoard Conservation Program. An Interview with Pieta Greaves. In The Public Archaeology of Treasure. Archaeopress. (pp 96-112)
3. Noble, G., & Brophy, K. (2011). Ritual and remembrance at a prehistoric ceremonial complex in central Scotland: excavations at Forteviot, Perth and Kinross. Antiquity, 85(329), 787–804.
