= Staffordshire Hoard =

Anglo-Saxon hoard discovered in 2009

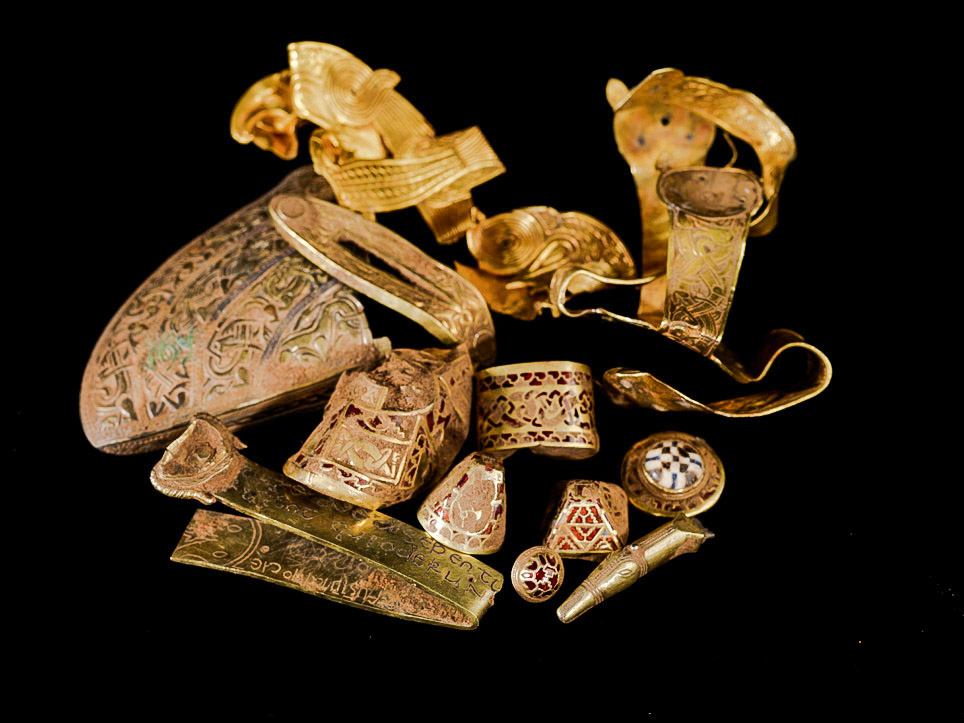
- A selection of highlight pieces from the Staffordshire Hoard (top) and a gold sword hilt fitting with cloisonné garnet inlay (below), uncleaned by conservators, still showing traces of soil

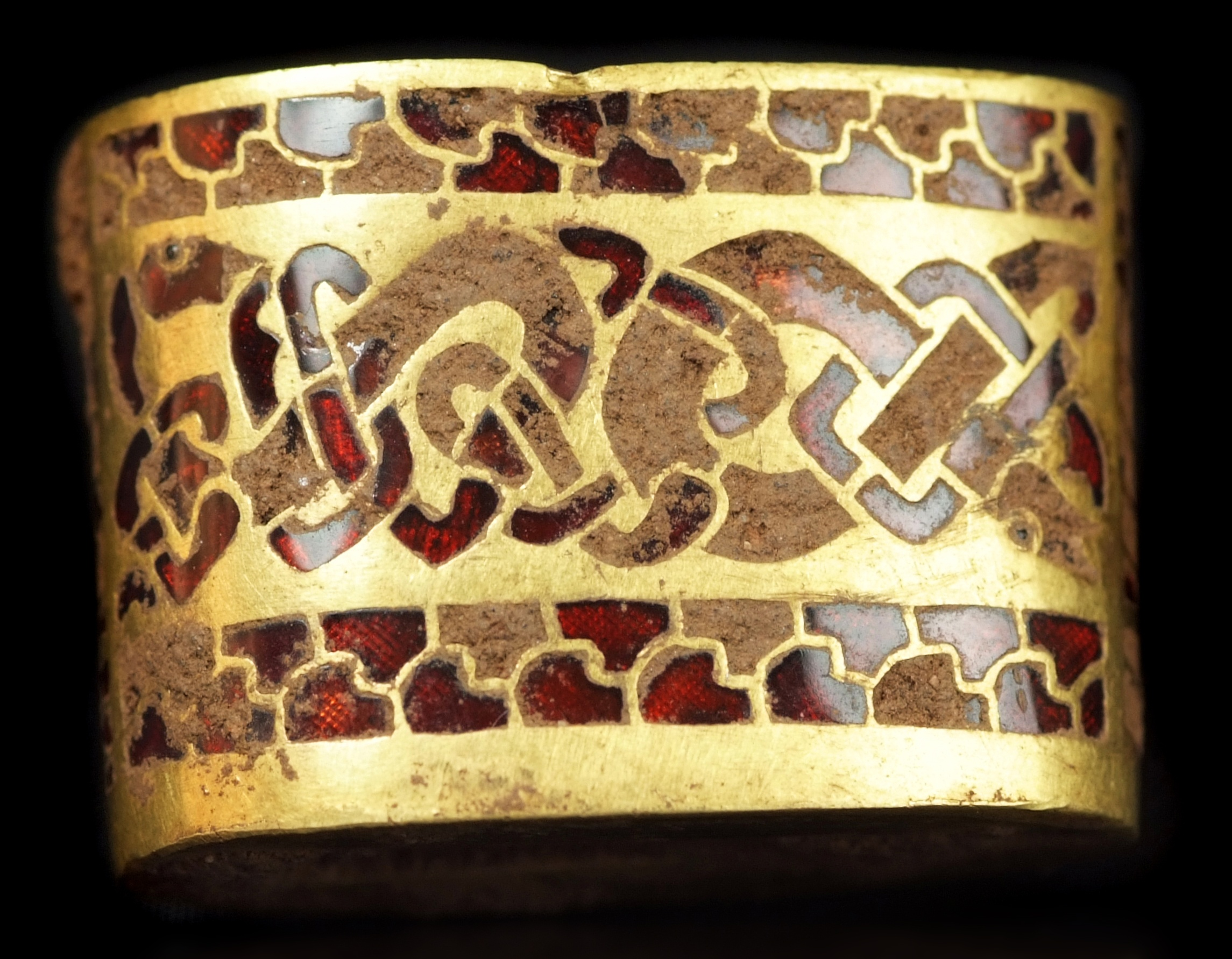
- Material: Gold; Silver; Stone; Garnet
- Size: almost 4,600 items
- Writing: Latin
- Created: c. 7th to 8th centuries
- Discovered: 2009; Hammerwich near Lichfield, Staffordshire, England; 52°39′19″N 1°54′24″W
- Discovered by: Terry Herbert
- Present location: Birmingham Museum and Art Gallery; Potteries Museum & Art Gallery, Stoke-on-Trent

The Staffordshire Hoard is the largest hoard of Anglo-Saxon gold and silver metalwork yet found. It consists of almost 4,600 items and metal fragments, amounting to a total of 5.1 kg (11 lb) of gold, 1.4 kg (3 lb) of silver and some 3,500 pieces of garnet cloisonné jewellery. It is described by the historian Cat Jarman as "possibly the finest collection of early medieval artefacts ever discovered".

The hoard was most likely deposited between 650 and 675 CE, and contains artefacts probably manufactured during the 6th and 7th centuries. It was discovered in 2009 in a field near the village of Hammerwich, near Lichfield, in Staffordshire, England. The location was in the Anglo-Saxon kingdom of Mercia at the time of the hoard's deposition.

The hoard is of "radical" importance in Anglo-Saxon archaeology. The artefacts are nearly all martial in character and contain no objects specific to use by women. The average quality of the workmanship is extremely high and especially remarkable in view of the large number of individual objects, such as swords and a helmet, from which many of the fragments in the hoard came.

The hoard was purchased jointly by the Birmingham Museum and Art Gallery and the Potteries Museum & Art Gallery for £3.285 million under the Treasure Act 1996.

== Contents ==
The hoard includes almost 4,600 items and metal fragments, totalling 5.094 kg (11.23 lb) of gold and 1.442 kg (3.18 lb) of silver, with 3,500 cloisonné garnets and is the largest treasure of Anglo-Saxon gold and silver objects discovered to date, eclipsing, at least in quantity, the 1.5 kg (3.3 lb) hoard found in the Sutton Hoo ship burial in 1939.

Apart from three religious objects the items in the hoard are military, and there are no domestic objects, such as vessels or eating utensils, or feminine jewellery, which are the more common Anglo-Saxon gold finds. Reportedly, the contents "show every sign of being carefully selected". There is broad agreement that the typical object in the hoard was made in the 7th century, with the date of the deposition of the hoard of course post-dating the manufacture of the latest object it includes.

Along with other discoveries, examination of the hoard showed Saxon goldsmiths were able to alter the surface of the gold by depletion gilding to give the appearance of a higher gold content, a technique not previously credited to them. As with other Anglo-Saxon jewellery, the garnets in 28 pieces may have come from as far away as Sri Lanka or Afghanistan, probably in the Roman period.

A summary of the preliminary contents of the hoard, as of late 2009, is shown in the table below. This excludes items such as the gold horse's head that were in one of the 33 soil blocks that had not been examined at the time of publication of these figures.

Summary of items found
Description	Gold	Silver	Base metal	Composite metals	Stone or glass	Uncertain	Total
Appliqué	1						1
Bead					1		1
Boss	6	1					7
Brooch		1					1
Buckle and plate	2						2
Button	1						1
Cross	5						5
Dome		1					1
Edging	11	69	6	1			87
Fish	1						1
Fitting	35	11	3	4			53
Foil	16						16
Fragment	79	177	29	19	4	7	315
Garnet					26		26
Glass gem					1		1
Mount	15	4					19
Panel	3						3
Pin	2	5					7
Plate	58	13	1	1	1		74
Ring	12	1					13
Rivet	27	29	5	4			65
Setting	2				1		3
Sheet metal	36	233	12	3		2	286
Slag						2	2
Snake	5						5
Spillage			1				1
Stone					1		1
Strip	94	102	5	1		1	203
Stud	9	3	1				13
Sword hilt plate or fitting	178	29	8	1		1	217
Sword pommel	69	10	5	2			86
Sword pyramid	8	1		1			10
Sword scabbard loop	1						1
Wire	34	13	1			1	49
Unidentified	2	4	1	2	1	8	18
Total	712	707	78	39	36	22	1,594

=== Weaponry ===
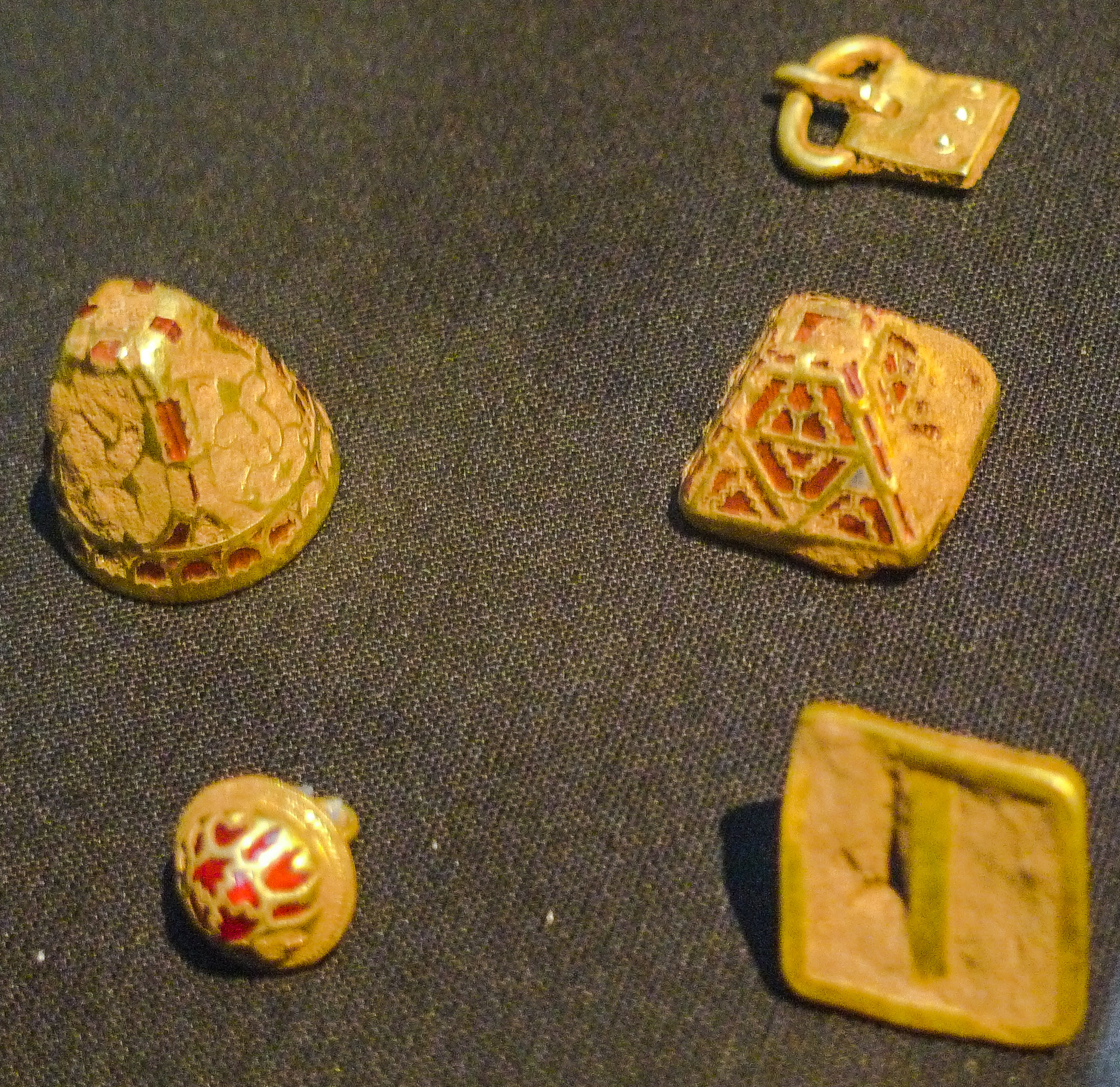
Assorted uncleaned gold fittings, three with cloisonné gold and garnet

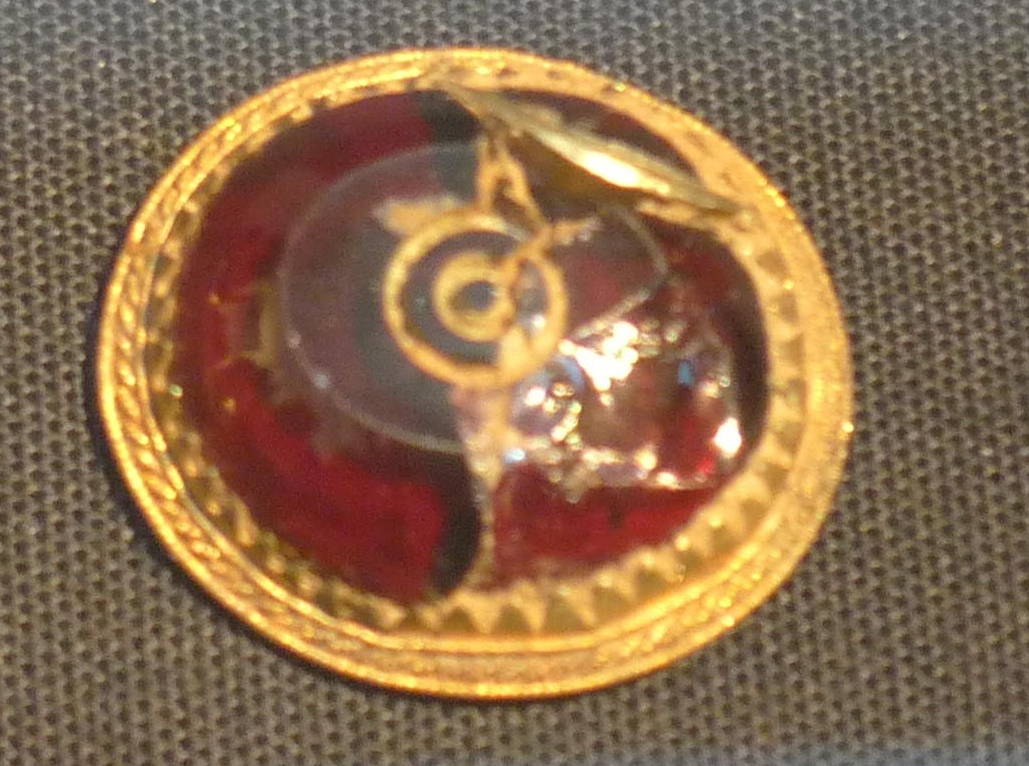
Sword fitting with garnet

The contents include many finely worked silver and gold sword decorations removed from weaponry, including 66 gold sword hilt collars and many gold hilt plates, some with inlays of cloisonné garnet in zoomorphic designs (see lead picture). The 86 sword pommels found constitute the largest ever discovery of pommels in a single context, with many different types (some previously unknown) supporting the idea that the pommels were manufactured over a wide range of time.

=== Crosses ===
The Staffordshire Hoard official press statement notes that the only items in the hoard that are obviously non-martial are two (or possibly three) crosses. Sharp (2016) has shown there are possibly many pieces with a Christian connection and the hoard is a mixture of many Christian and non-martial items. The largest of the three crosses is missing some decorative settings (yet some are present but detached) but otherwise remains intact. It may have been an altar or processional cross. It could also have been attached to the front of a book, such as a Gospel Book. Yet the cross is folded.

As to the reason or reasons for this, three explanations have been put forward. One is that the folding was done prior to burial "to make it fit into a small space". A second explanation suggests that this is a sign that the burial deposit was made by pagans, who had no particular esteem for the Christian character of the objects. A third view runs in an opposite direction, namely, that this was done with reverence by Christians in order to remove the sacred character of this cross, and other Christian pieces, prior to burying them.

=== Gold strip ===
One of the most intriguing items in the hoard is a small strip of gold (St.H 550), measuring 179 mm × 15.8 mm × 2.1 mm (7.047 in × 0.622 in × 0.083 in) when unfolded, inscribed with a biblical quotation, from Numbers 10:35, in insular majuscule, on both sides, as

(outside) [S]URGE:DNE:DISEPENTURINIMICITUIE/T | [F]UGENT QUIODERUNTTEAFACIETUA
(inside) SURGE DNE DISEPINTUR [...MIC]ITUIE/TFUGIU[N/T]QUIO DE | [R]UNTTE AF ACIE TU[..]DIUIE NOS[.R.]

The Nova Vulgata reading of this passage is:

Surge Domine et dissipentur inimici tui et fugiant qui oderunt te a facie tua
(KJV: "Rise up, LORD, and let thine enemies be scattered; and let them that hate thee flee before thee.")

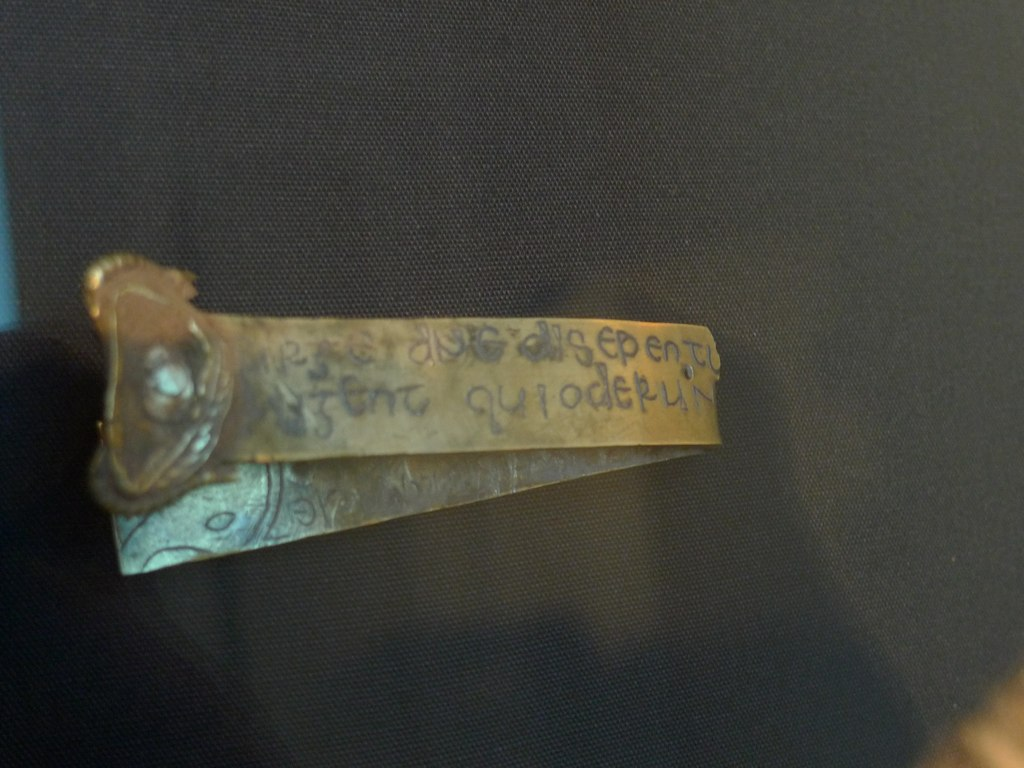
Gold strip with inscription

The reading of the additional words on the second version of the text, [a]diuie nos[.r.], is unclear; they may be practice letters 2 meaning that the inside face was not supposed to be visible, and contains an abandoned attempt at the inscription.

The passage is quoted fairly often, notably in the Life of the Mercian Saint Guthlac (d. 714), most likely composed in the 730s. The passage occurs in the context of Guthlac's meeting with Æthelbald, the later king of Mercia, in which the saint foretells that the king's enemy would "flee from your face". The parallel verse from Psalm 67 (Hebrew numbering 68), verse 2, occurs when Guthlac is driving away demons who appeared to him in a vision. Sharp (2016) has suggested the inscription shows angst in the face of a great threat and this could only have been the Viking invasion. The incised strip appears to be the stem of a cross and this indicates a Viking threat to a church. Paleographically, the inscription most likely dates to the 8th century, with the late 7th or early 9th not to be ruled out. Elisabeth Okasha notes that the closest parallel to the script used is the inscription in the lead plate from Flixborough, dated to the 8th or 9th century.

The gold strip may have been originally fastened to a shield or a sword belt, or alternatively, it may have been part of the arm of a cross; a round cabochon jewel would have been fitted to the terminal end, and the other end would have fitted into the central fitting of the cross.

== Context and purpose ==
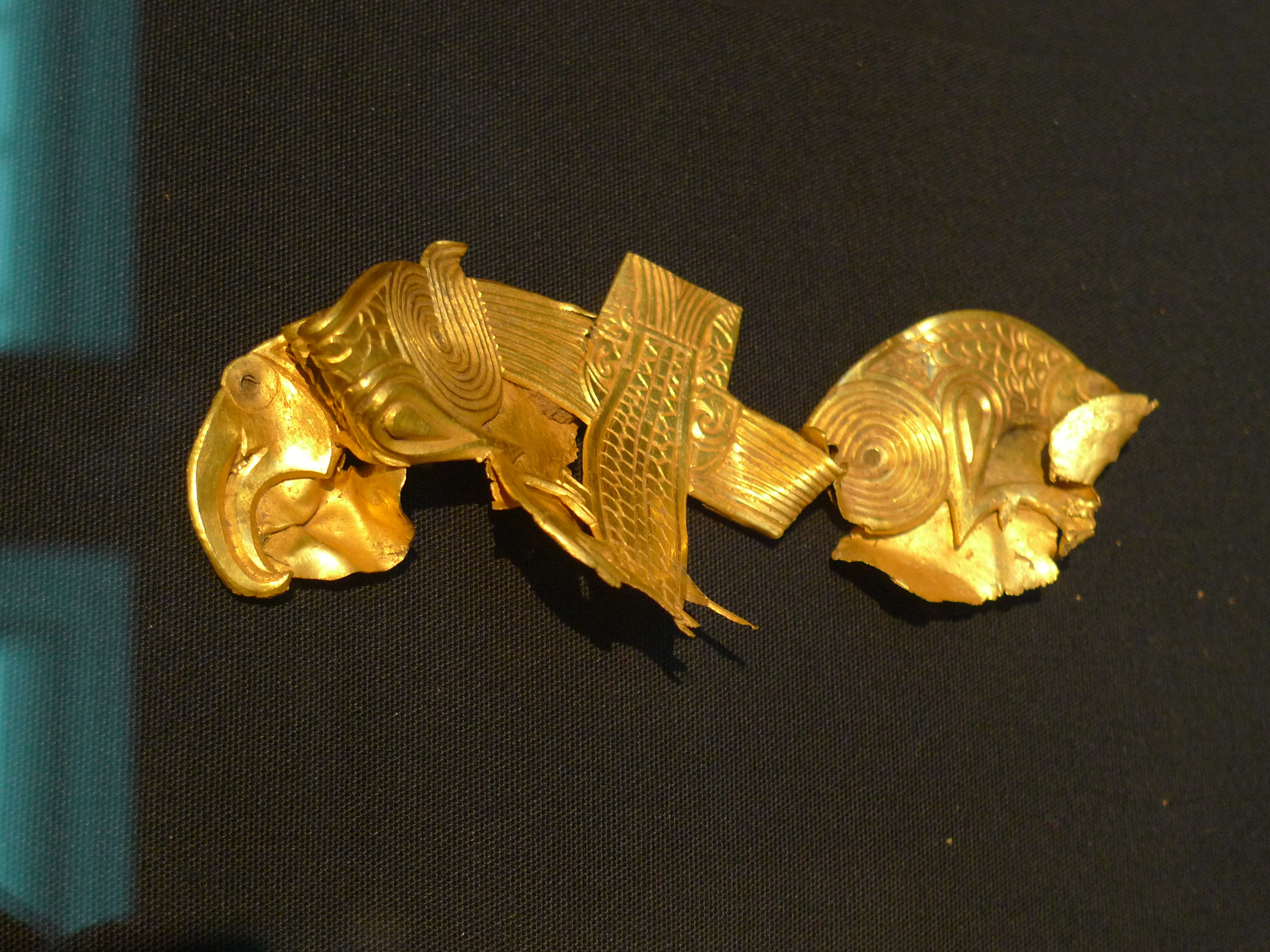
Sheet gold plaque

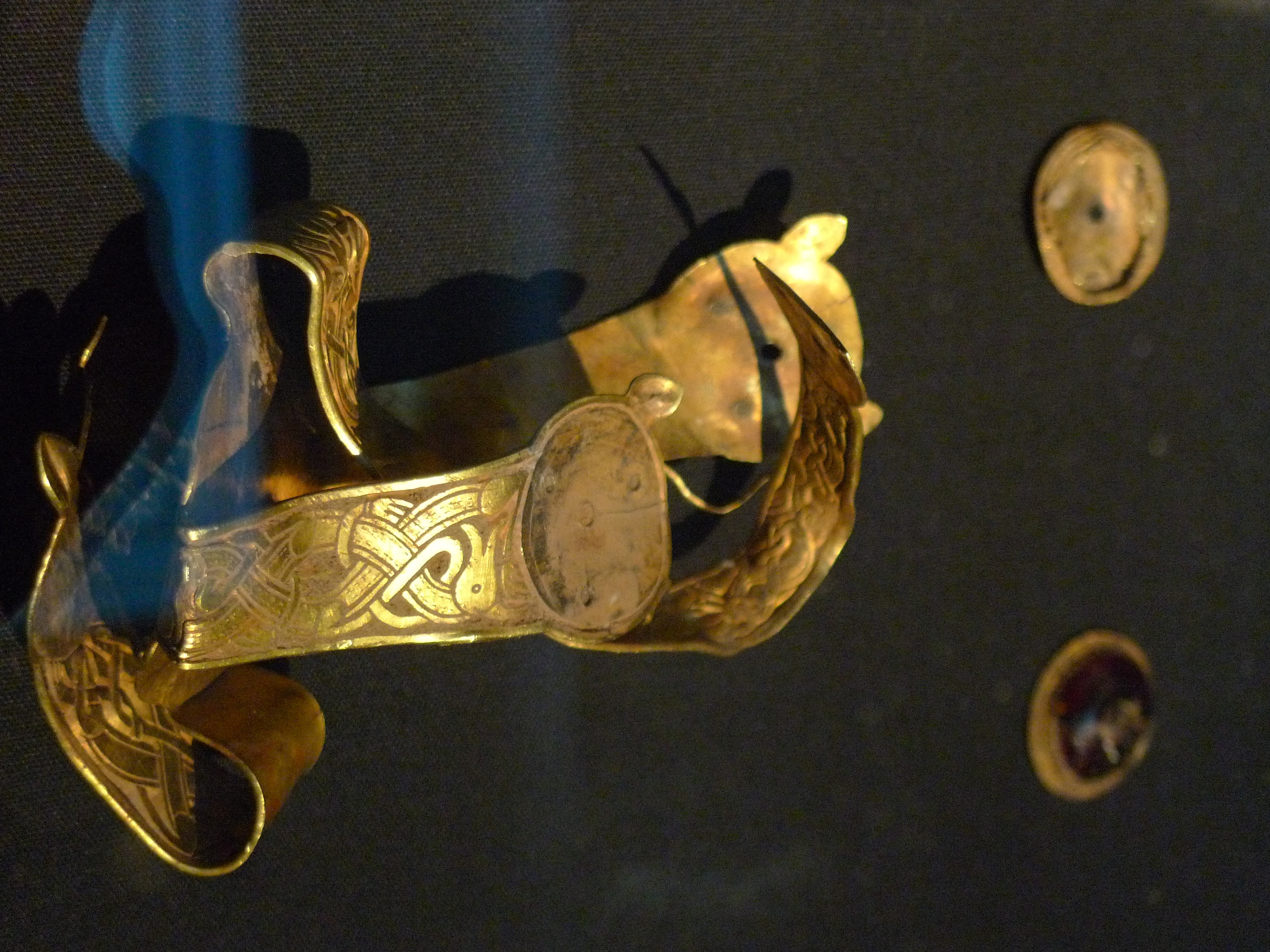
Folded panel from a cross, with interlace

The hoard was deposited in a remote area, just south of the Roman Watling Street, some 4 kilometres (2 mi) west of Letocetum, at the time part of the extra-parochial area of Ogley Hay (now part of the Hammerwich parish), in the highland separating the Pencersæte and Tomsæte within the kingdom of Mercia.

The quality of the artefacts buried in the hoard is very high. The apparent selection of "martial" artefacts, especially the decoration of swords, does not suggest that the hoard consists simply of loot. Most of the gold and silver items appear to have been intentionally removed from the objects they were previously attached to. Brooks (2010) associates the predominantly warlike character of the artefacts in the hoard with the custom of giving war-gear (heriot) as death duty to the king upon the death of one of his noblemen. The removal of the sword pommel caps finds a parallel in Beowulf which mentions warriors stripping the pommels of their enemies' swords. (Note: The Old English poem Beowulf contains lines that experts believe may describe circumstances similar to the burial of the hoard: "One warrior stripped the other, looted Ongentheow's iron mail-coat, his hard sword-hilt, his helmet too, and carried graith to King Hygelac; he accepted the prize, promised fairly that reward would come, and kept his word. They let the ground keep that ancestral treasure, gold under gravel, gone to earth, as useless to men now as it ever was.") Wall (2015) postulates a connection to Peada, briefly king of Mercia in 655–656 CE. Sharp (2016) connects the deposition of the Hoard with the Viking attack on Lichfield in 875 and postulates its loss at the same time as the removal of the St. Chad's Gospel from Lichfield into the Welsh area of Mercia.

== Discovery and excavation ==
Gold artefacts were discovered by Terry Herbert, a member of Bloxwich Research and Metal Detecting Club, (Note: One day, or perhaps one night, in the late seventh century an unknown party traveled along an old Roman road that cut across an uninhabited heath fringed by forest in the Anglo-Saxon kingdom of Mercia. Possibly they were soldiers, or then again, maybe thieves — the remote area would remain notorious for highwaymen for centuries — but at any rate they were [certainly] not casual travelers. Stepping off the road near the rise of a small ridge, they dug a pit and buried a stash of treasure in the ground. For 1,300 years the treasure lay undisturbed, and eventually the landscape evolved from forest clearing to grazing pasture to working field. Then treasure hunters equipped with metal detectors — ubiquitous in Britain — began to call on farmer Fred Johnson, asking permission to walk the field. "I told one I'd lost a wrench and asked him to find that," Johnson says. Instead, on 5 July 2009, Terry Herbert came to the farmhouse door and announced to Johnson that he had found Anglo-Saxon treasure. The Staffordshire Hoard, as it was quickly dubbed, electrified the general public and Anglo-Saxon scholars alike. Spectacular discoveries, such as the royal finds at Sutton Hoo in Suffolk, had been made in Anglo-Saxon burial sites. But the treasure pulled from Fred Johnson's field was novel — a cache of gold, silver, and garnet objects from early Anglo-Saxon times and from one of the most important kingdoms of the era. Moreover, the quality and style of the intricate filigree and cloisonné decorating the objects were extraordinary, inviting heady comparisons to such legendary treasures as the Lindisfarne Gospels or the Book of Kells. — C. Alexander (2011)) on 5 July 2009, when he was searching an area of recently ploughed farmland near Hammerwich, Staffordshire, with a metal detector. Over the next five days, 244 gold objects were recovered from the soil. At this point Herbert contacted Duncan Slarke, the finds liaison officer for the Staffordshire and West Midlands Portable Antiquities Scheme. The landowner, Fred Johnson, granted permission for an archaeological excavation to search for the rest of the hoard.

=== 2009 excavation ===
Excavation work was funded by English Heritage who contracted Birmingham Archaeology to do the fieldwork. Ploughing had scattered the artefacts, so an area 9 by 13 metres (30 by 43 ft) was excavated in the search. Because of the importance of the find, the exact site of the hoard was initially kept secret. A geophysical survey of the field in which the hoard was found, discovered what could be a ditch close to the find. Although excavations revealed no dating evidence for the feature, further investigation is planned. In total over 3,500 pieces were recovered. A final geophysical survey using specialist equipment provided by the Home Office did not suggest any further artefacts remained to be found.

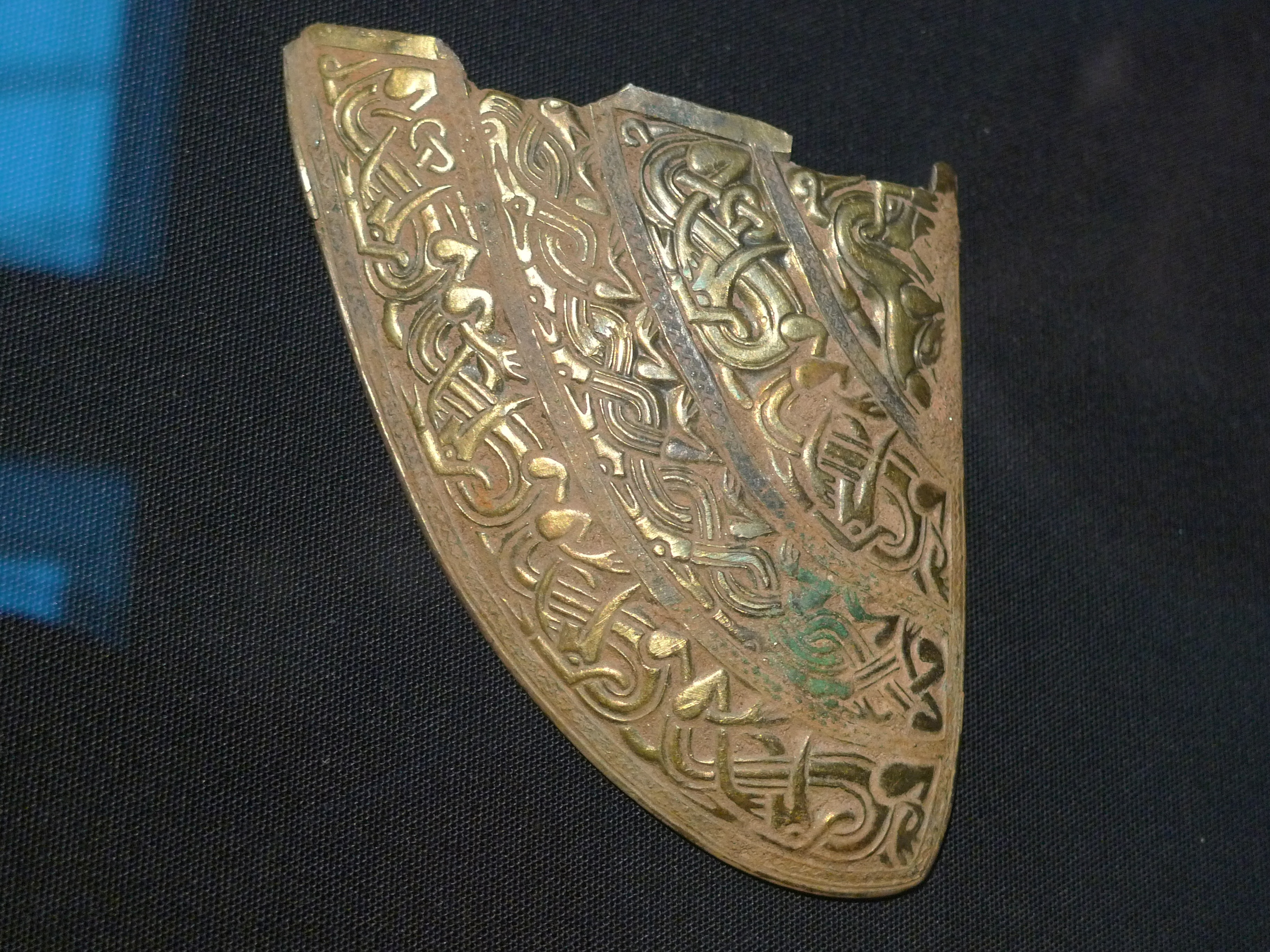
Cheek piece from the Staffordshire helmet

The discovery was publicly announced on 24 September 2009, attracting worldwide attention. An official website set up to showcase finds from the Hoard received over 10 million views in the first week after the announcement. Whilst Birmingham Archaeology continued to process the find, items from the Hoard were displayed at the Birmingham Museum and Art Gallery until 13 October 2009, attracting 40,000 people. Andrew Haigh, the coroner for South Staffordshire, declared the hoard to be treasure, and therefore property of the Crown. A further selection of pieces from the Hoard was displayed at the Potteries Museum & Art Gallery, Stoke-on-Trent. Key items and numerous smaller pieces were then taken to the British Museum, London, where cataloguing, and some initial cleaning and conservation work commenced.

As of 24 September 2009, 1,381 objects had been recovered, of which 864 have a mass of less than 3 grams (0.096 ozt), 507 less than 1 gram (0.032 ozt), leaving just 10 larger items. X-rays of unexamined lumps of earth suggested that there are more to be revealed. Early analysis established that the hoard was not associated with a burial.

=== 2010 excavation ===
In late March 2010, a team of archaeologists carried out a follow-up excavation on the site, digging 100 metres (110 yd) of trenches and pits in the field. According to Staffordshire county archaeologist Stephen Dean, there was no more gold or treasure to recover from the site, and the aim of the new excavation was to look for dating and environmental evidence. Archaeologists hoped to be able to use this evidence to determine what the landscape looked like at the time that the hoard was deposited.

=== 2012 finds ===
In December 2012, it was announced that 91 additional items of gold and silver metalwork had been found in the field where the Staffordshire Hoard was discovered in 2009. The finds were made in November 2012 when archaeologists and metal detectorists from Archaeology Warwickshire, working for Staffordshire County Council and English Heritage, visited the field after it had been ploughed. Many of the pieces are less than 1 gram (0.032 ozt) in weight, but there are some larger pieces, including a cross-shaped mount, an eagle-shaped mount, and a helmet cheek piece that matches one from the 2009 discovery. These additional pieces are believed to be part of the original hoard.

In January 2013, 81 of the 91 items were declared treasure at a coroner's inquest, and, after they have been valued by the Treasure Valuation Committee, Staffordshire County Council will have an opportunity to purchase the items so that they can be reunited with the rest of the hoard. Although these items were found by archaeologists, the money raised by their sale will be shared between Herbert and Johnson as they were responsible for the original discovery of the hoard. The ten items not declared treasure were identified as modern waste material.

Kevin Leahy of the British Museum has stated that the ten items not declared as belonging to the original hoard may represent part of a different Anglo-Saxon period hoard. Two of these ten items are high-quality pieces of copper alloy, but they are different in style to the gold and silver items of the original hoard. He concludes that "Anglo Saxons clearly visited the site more than once to bury items".

=== Valuation and sale ===
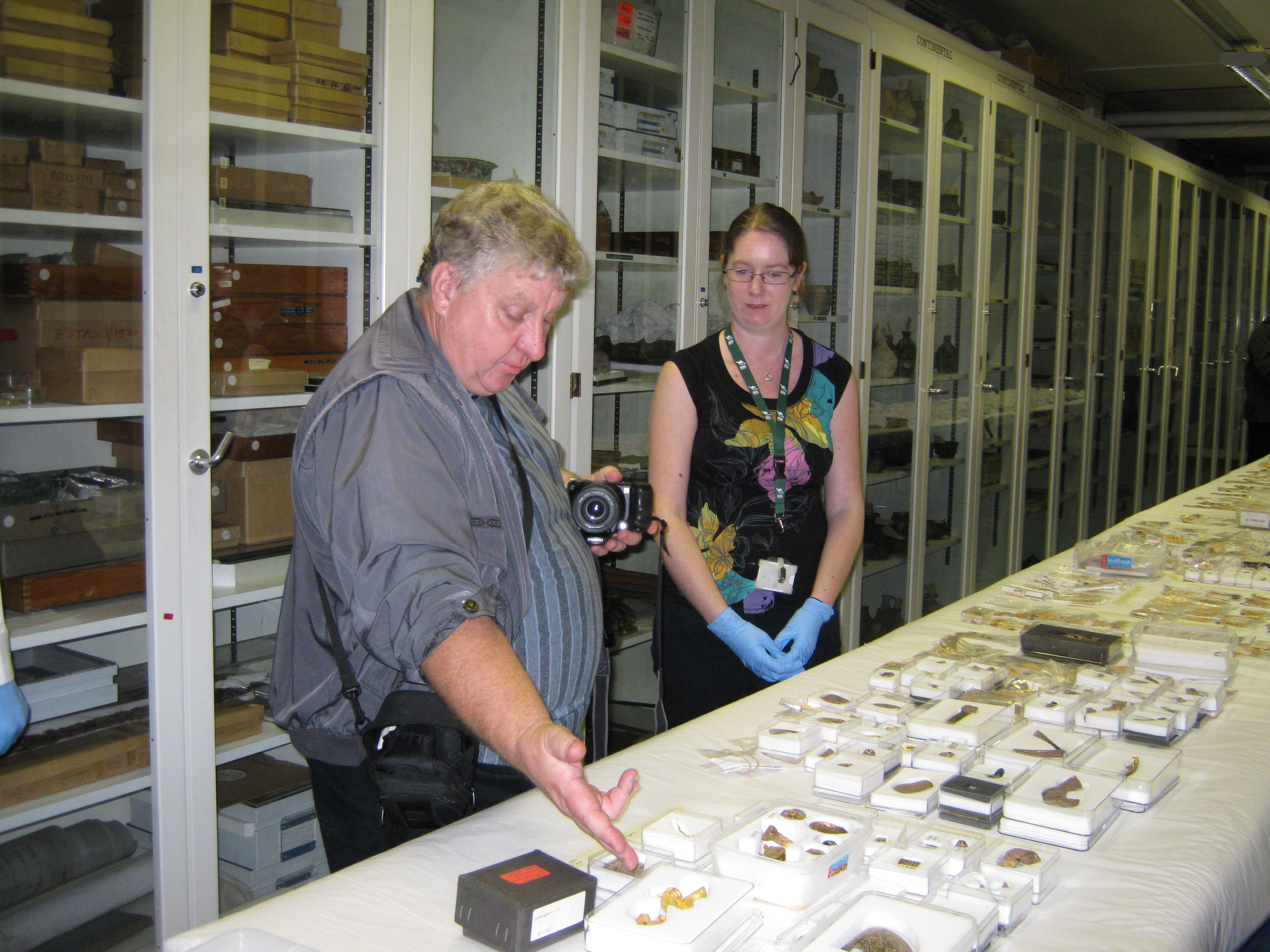
Terry Herbert examining items from the Staffordshire Hoard at the British Museum in October 2009. The items have been laid out for valuation by the Treasure Valuation Committee.

On 25 November 2009, the hoard was valued by the Treasure Valuation Committee at £3.285 million, which, under the provisions of the 1996 Treasure Act, is the sum that must be paid as a reward to the finder and landowner, to be shared equally, by any museum that wishes to acquire the hoard.

After the hoard was valued, it was announced that the Birmingham Museum and Art Gallery and the Potteries Museum & Art Gallery intended to acquire the entire hoard jointly, and a public appeal was launched to raise the amount needed. The Art Fund co-ordinated the appeal. If the sum had not been raised by 17 April 2010, the hoard might have been sold on the open market and the unique collection permanently broken up. On 23 March 2010 it was announced that the sum had been raised three weeks before the deadline, after a grant of £1.285 million from the National Heritage Memorial Fund (NHMF) was added to the money already collected from individuals, councils, and other groups and associations. Although the purchase price has been achieved, the Art Fund appeal continued, in order to raise a further £1.7 million to help fund the conservation, study and display of the hoard.

Terry Herbert, the finder of the hoard, and Fred Johnson, the farmer on whose land the hoard was found, each received a half share of the £3.285 million raised by the Birmingham Museum & Art Gallery and the Potteries Museum & Art Gallery. The two men were later reported to have "fallen out" over the division of the money.

=== Display ===
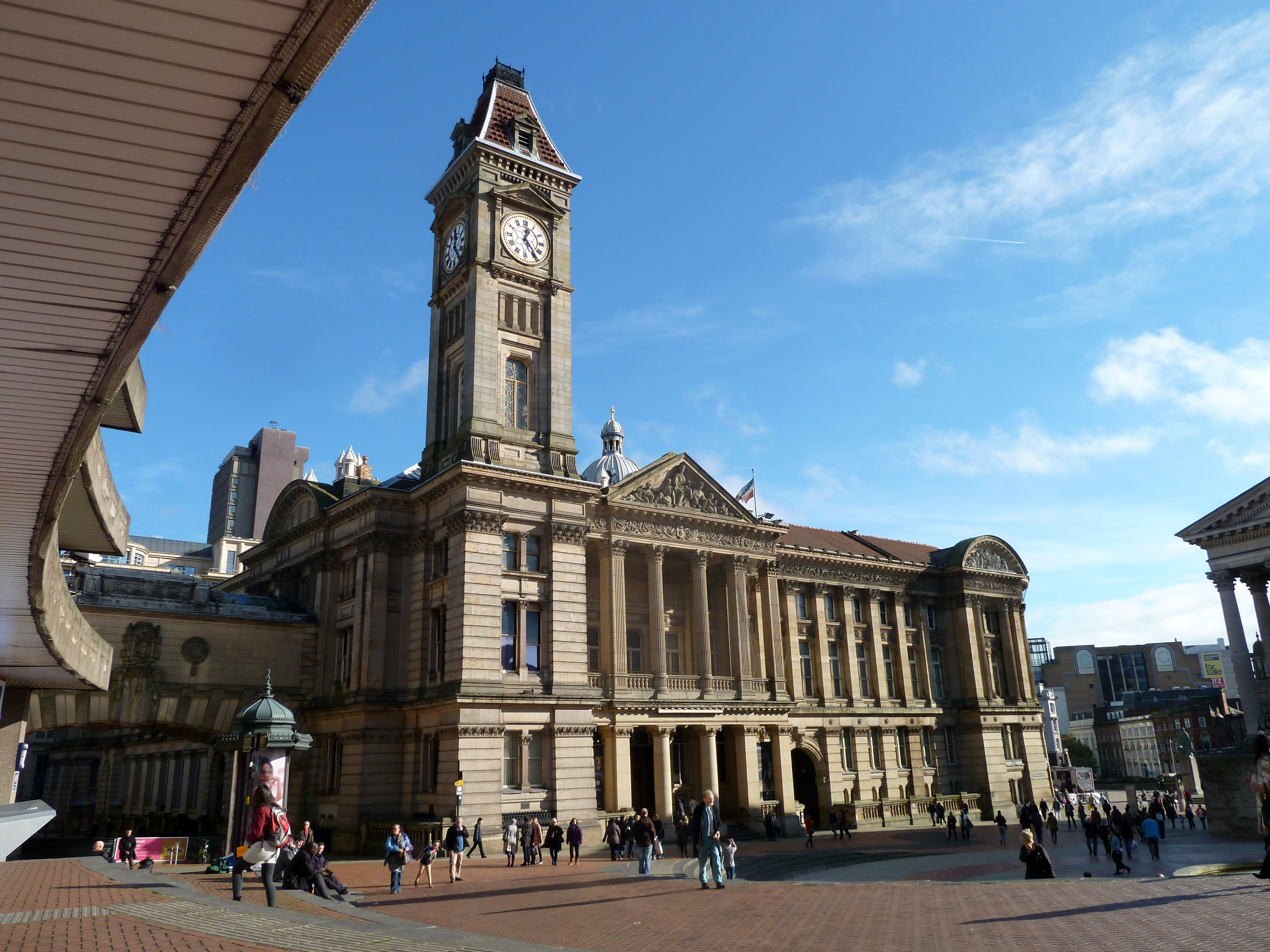
Birmingham Museum and Art Gallery

The hoard was first displayed at the Birmingham Museum and Art Gallery (from 24 September 2009 until 13 October 2009), and subsequently part of the hoard was put on display at the British Museum (from 3 November 2009 until 17 April 2010). Eighty items from the hoard, including a gold horse's head that has not previously been exhibited, went on display at the Potteries Museum & Art Gallery in Stoke-on-Trent from 13 February 2010 until 7 March 2010. Items from the hoard were on display at the National Geographic Museum in Washington, D.C., United States, from 29 October 2011 to 4 March 2012. Birmingham Museum has had a permanent gallery dedicated to the hoard since 2014, and the Potteries Museum has a hoard exhibition, and there are regular loans made to historic Mercian sites Tamworth Castle and Lichfield Cathedral, as part of the Mercian Trail. Two replicas of the helmet have been made for display in the museums in Birmingham and Stoke.

On 26 January 2012, the hoard was featured in the hour-long BBC Two documentary Saxon Hoard: A Golden Discovery presented by TV historian Dan Snow. A similar show, titled Secrets of the Saxon Gold, was aired on 22 April 2012 as a Time Team special, presented by Tony Robinson.

In 2016, weapon fittings from the hoard went on a national tour of the U.K., "Warrior treasures: Saxon gold from the Staffordshire Hoard", to the Royal Armouries, Leeds (May–October) and Bristol Museum & Art Gallery (October 2016–April 2017).

In 2020, part of the hoard was to be displayed at the National Trust's Sutton Hoo visitor centre, alongside items usually on display in the British Museum, running from May to November 2020, but was disrupted by COVID-19.

== Research and conservation ==
A major research and conservation project began in 2012 to clean, investigate and research the Staffordshire Hoard objects. The project is funded by Historic England, Birmingham Museums Trust and the Potteries Museum & Art Gallery, Stoke, with the support of other patrons.

The first phase of the research project ran from 2012 to 2014 and was mainly focused on cleaning and cataloguing the objects, as well as conducting a programme of scientific analysis at the British Museum. A 'grouping exercise' brought all the objects together in 2014 for several weeks' intensive study and following this, a second phase concentrated on joining broken objects, further scientific analysis and typological study. Study of the objects was completed in 2016, and work continues on the final publication of the results, which will include an online catalogue as well as research publication.

The research project has revealed many new insights into the collection, including a number of new objects and information about the manufacture of the metalwork and construction of the objects. Byzantine coins, for example, are believed to be a primary source for the gold found in the items, and the garnets were probably recycled from Roman objects, with some sourced in India and Sri Lanka.

== See also ==
- Staffordshire helmet
- History of Anglo-Saxon England
- List of hoards in Great Britain
- Forsbrook Pendant, an item of Anglo-Saxon jewellery found in Forsbrook, Staffordshire
- Leekfrith torcs, four Iron Age gold torcs found in Staffordshire
- Lenborough Hoard, a hoard of 5,251 late Anglo-Saxon silver coins
- Vale of York Hoard, a 10th-century Viking hoard of over 617 silver coins and other items

== Footnotes ==
The poem Beowulf contains lines that experts believe may describe circumstances similar to the burial of the hoard:

"One warrior stripped the other, looted Ongentheow's iron mail-coat, his hard sword-hilt, his helmet too, and carried graith to King Hygelac; he accepted the prize, promised fairly that reward would come, and kept his word. They let the ground keep that ancestral treasure, gold under gravel, gone to earth, as useless to men now as it ever was."

translation of Beowulf by Heaney (1999)

The quote, above, is conflated from Seamus Heaney's 1999 translation of two passages, 2985–2990 and 3166–3168.

Original Beowulf text, trans. on far right:

þenden reafode	rinc oðerne,	[2985]	One warrior stripped the other,
nam on Ongenðio	irenbyrnan,		looted Ongentheow's iron mail-coat,
heard swyrd hilted	ond his helm somod,		his hard sword-hilt, his helmet too,
hares hyrste	Higelace bær.		and carried graith to King Hygelac;
He ðam frætwum feng	ond him fægre gehet		he accepted the prize, promised fairly
leana mid leodum,	ond gelæste swa;		that reward would come, and kept his word.
⋮	⋮
forleton eorla gestreon	eorðan healdan,	[3166]	They let the ground keep that ancestral treasure,
gold on greote,	þær hit nu gen lifað		gold under gravel, gone to earth,
eldum swa unnyt	swa hit æror wæs.		as useless to men now as it ever was.
