= Rodi Kratsa-Tsagaropoulou =

Greek politician

- Ρόδη Κράτσα-Τσαγκαροπούλου
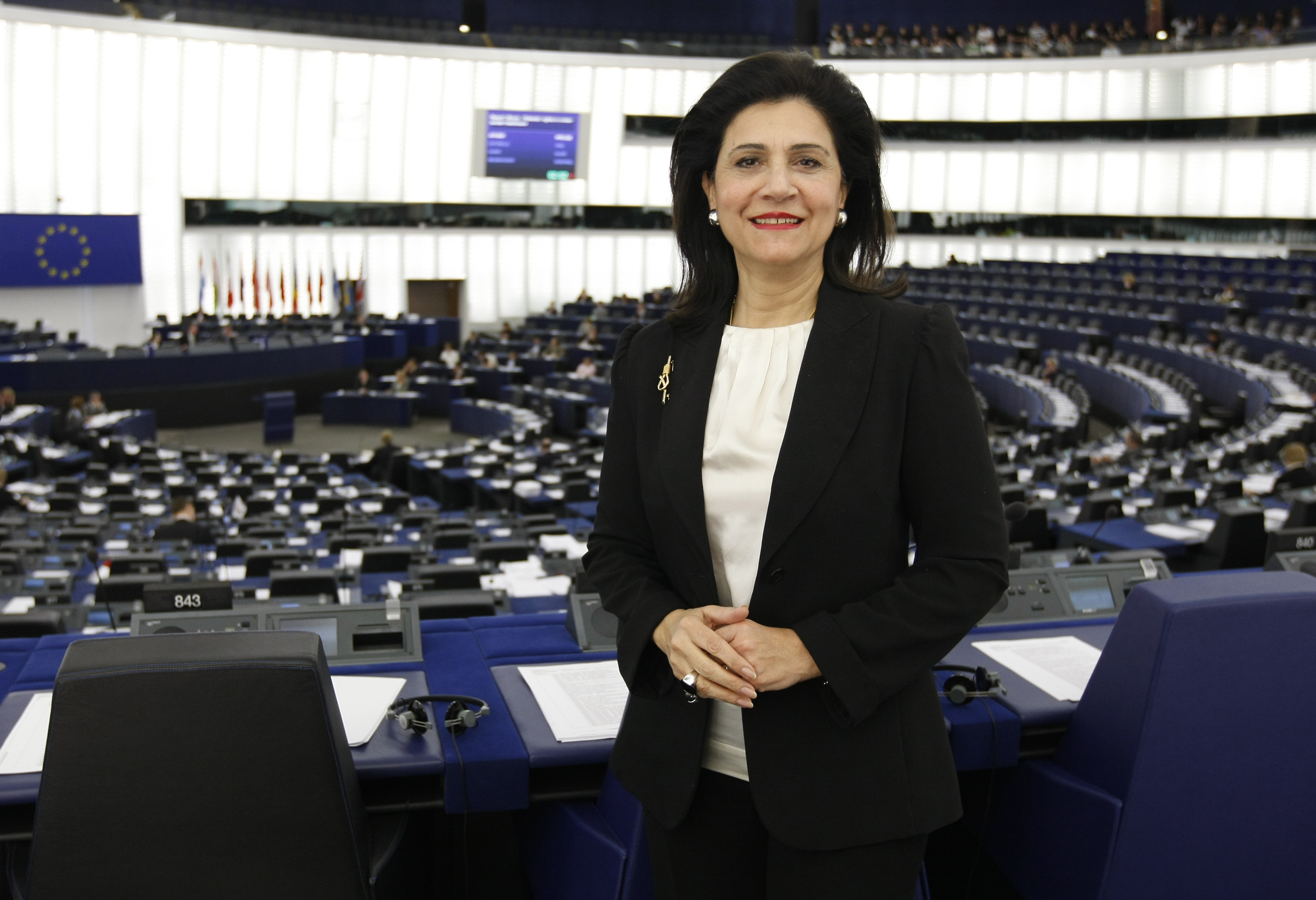
- Kratsa-Tsagaropoulou in 2009

Regional Governor of the Ionian Islands
- In office 1 September 2019 – 31 December 2023

First Vice-President of the European Parliament
- In office 16 January 2007 – 14 July 2009
- President: Hans-Gert Pöttering
- Preceded by: Alejo Vidal-Quadras Roca
- Succeeded by: Giovanni Pittella

Member of the European Parliament for Greece
- In office 20 July 1999 – 30 June 2014

Personal details
- Born: Zakynthos, Greece
- Party: New Democracy
- Spouse: Apostolos Kratsas
- Children: 2

Rodi Kratsa-Tsagaropoulou is a politician with a long career in both European and Greek politics. She holds global and local experience in high-ranking positions. During her career she has been mainly involved in European integration, peace, sustainable development, human rights, economic affairs and international cooperation. Her work has been recognised with several high honors and awards by states and institutions. She is currently a Member of the UN Alliance of Civilisations Chair at Euro-Mediterranean University of Morocco (UEMF).

She was elected First Vice-President of the European Parliament and served two terms as Vice-President (2007–2009 and 2009–2012), the highest position ever held by a Greek person in that institution.

During her fifteen years (1999–2014) as a Member of the European Parliament, in the European People’s Party group (EPP), she was active in significant parliamentary committees, notably those on Economic and Monetary Affairs, Transport and Tourism, Budgetary Control, Regional Development, Social Affairs and Gender Equality. She worked on the strengthening of the European integration as well as the international role of the EU. She has undertaken an active role in delegations in the Mediterranean, Middle East, Caucasus countries and Latin America and has taken part and led a number of missions in different parts of the world.

In 2014 she was appointed President of the Konstantinos Karamanlis Institute for Democracy in Greece.

Kratsa-Tsagaropoulou was elected as the Regional Governor the Ionian islands, Greece, serving from September 2019 to December 2023. She was the first woman to ever hold this position. In this role, she focused on promoting responsible tourism, cultural heritage and conservation, sustainable development and modern infrastructure. She also addressed environmental and climate challenges and managed local issues in the framework of the UN 2030 Agenda of Sustainable Development Goals (SDGs).

Kratsa-Tsagaropoulou is also active in civil society and a founding member since 1987 and then President of the Women of Europe International Association (AIPFE) across the EU and beyond.

== Early life and education ==
Kratsa-Tsagaropoulou was born and brought up on the island of Zakynthos, Greece, where she lived until she was 16 years old. She was the first child of Spiridon Tsagaropoulos and Vasiliki Tsagaropoulou (née Deligianopoulou). Her family were merchants for many generations and her brother Iakovos Tsagaropoulos continued the family business, until he passed away in 2023.

Kratsa-Tsagaropoulou relocated to Athens to finish high school and then moved to Switzerland for preparatory university classes and lived between Geneva, Lausanne and Fribourg. She then studied Sociology, specialising in urban and political sociology, at the University of Geneva, Switzerland. Her postgraduate studies followed at the Institute of European Studies (today Institute of Global Studies) of the University of Geneva focusing on European integration and intercultural dialogue. During her student years she was active in civil society, particularly in the International European Movement (IEM) and Jeunes Européens Fédéralistes (JEF) as well as female empowerment, values that followed her through her life. After her studies she returned to Greece and worked at the Ministry of Coordination and Finance at the department for the preparation of the adhesion of Greece in the European Communities.

She finalised a masters programme in 2026 at the National and Kapodistrian University of Athens on International & European Governance and Politics focusing on Cultural Governance and Security.

Kratsa-Tsagaropoulou has also been awarded a Doctor Honoris Causa by the Euro-Mediterranean University of Slovenia (EMUNI) on Euromediterranean Relations & International Cooperation in 2010 and a Doctor Honoris Causa on Euromediterranean Relations by the Sidi Mohamed Ben Abdellah University of Fes, Morocco in 2011.

== Political career ==
=== European and international politics ===
Kratsa-Tsagaropoulou was first elected as a Member of the European Parliament (MEP) in 1999 with the European People’s Party (EPP). She was re-elected in 2004 and in 2009. She made numerous contributions through her legislative work but also with initiatives and projects at a European and international level.

As a three-term MEP (1999-2014), she was a rapporteur for significant reports and participated in drafting resolutions on crucial issues including the EU funding for international development, the situation of women in the Mediterranean region, the global financial crisis. She was also a founding member of several European Parliament intergroups acros political parties focusing on Islands, Tourism, Social Economy, Cultural, Francophonie and Linguistic Diversity.

Kratsa-Tsagaropoulou worked on strengthening partnerships between the EU and other countries and was part of Delegation for Relations with South Caucasus, Delegation to the Parliamentary Assembly of the Union for the Mediterranean (PA-UfM), Delegation for relations with the Mashreq countries (Egypt, Jordan, Lebanon and Syria) and Delegation to the Euro-Latin American Parliamentary Assembly (EuroLat).

She has been a member of European Parliament committees, such as Economic and Monetary Affairs, Budgetary Control, Regional Development, Social Affairs, Transport & Sustainable Tourism and Women's Rights & Gender Equality.

=== Vice-President of the European Parliament ===
In 2007 she was elected First Vice-President of the European Parliament, the highest position ever held by a Greek person in that institution. She held a top leadership position at one of the largest democratic assemblies in the world with a range of responsibilities: legislative conciliation and negotiation with the European Commission and the Member States (Council of Europe) with the objective of reaching an agreement for crucial issues of the European citizens, Information and Communication Policy of the European Parliament launching the innovative project of the Parlamentarium and Euro-Mediterranean cooperation and the Union for the Mediterranean (UfM). She also represented the President of the European Parliament at high-level international summits, including G8 and G20 meetings.

=== Euro-Mediterranean relations and intercultural dialogue ===
Kratsa-Tsagaropoulou was specifically responsible for Euro-Mediterranean cooperation since the Barcelona Process. She was involved in the creation of the parliamentary assembly of the Union for the Mediterranean (UfM). Notably, she initiated and established the assembly's Committee on Women's Rights and served as its first President. She was also a key person in the creation of the Euro-Mediterranean University of Slovenia (EMUNI) in Porto Roz and the Euro-Mediterranean University of Morocco (UEMF) in Fez fostering higher education, research dialogue and cooperation. She acted as a rapporteur for significant resolutions concerning the region, including the MEDA programs (the EU's financial instrument for the Euro-Mediterranean partnership).

=== Maritime and Tourism ===
Kratsa-Tsagaropoulou was a member of the Parliamentary Committee on Transport and Tourism (TRAN). She advocated for a common European tourism policy to boost international competitiveness, employment and regional development. As Vice-President of the European Parliament she was Chair of the Conciliation Committee and achieved the adoption of the first European Maritime Safety Package.

Kratsa-Tsagaropoulou initiated and established a European Maritime Day, on May 20, which was jointly voted by the Council, Parliament, and Commission in 2008 to raise awareness of the importance of seas and oceans to European citizens' daily lives, the sustainable ‘blue economy’ and growth.

She was a founding member of the European Parliament intergroup for Tourism and Islands, advocating for the particular needs of the islands.

=== Women’s Affairs ===
During her tenure as first Vice-President of the European Parliament (2007–2012), she launched and chaired the High-Level Group on Gender Equality, to monitor gender mainstreaming into the work of all parliamentary committees, the European budget, and internal staff policies. She was a long-standing member of the Committee on Women's Rights and Gender Equality (FEMM), serving as a coordinator and leading various legislative initiatives and procedures. She has taken part in missions of committee FEMM of the European Parliament in countries of East and Central Europe during the pre-enlargement period for the information and preparation of women’s participation as EU citizens.

Kratsa-Tsagaropoulou led and launched in 2012 an initiative report from the European Parliament to address the considerable imbalance between women and men in economic decision-making at the highest level, demanding at the European Commission a legislative proposal. In 2013 the European Commission submitted a proposal and then the European Parliament adopted a Directive, by a substantial majority, with lead Rapporteurs Rodi Kratsa-Tsagaropoulou and Evelyn Regner. The proposal of the Directive on gender balance among non-executive directors of companies listed on stock exchanges set the aim of a minimum of 40% of non-executive members of the under-represented sex on company boards, to be achieved by 2020 in the private sector and by 2018 in public-sector companies. The directive remained blocked in the Council for 10 years due to the lack of a favourable qualified majority. The Council and Parliament finally reached a provisional agreement on 7 June 2022 and the Directive entered into force on 7 December 2022.

During the preparation of the Treaty of Lisbon she was a vocal advocate to introduce in Article 2 on European values, equality between men and women as a specific value, in parallel to ‘equality’ in general.

=== Cultural and creative policy ===
Kratsa-Tsagaropoulou in the framework of the programme ‘Creative Europe,’ highlighted the importance of Creative and Cultural Industries in Europe led by her belief that the luxury goods sector is crucial to Europe’s sustainable growth and reagional development, based on cultural heritage and craftsmanship. She collaborated with the Comité Colbert and other stakeholders to support the production of high-end goods made in Europe.

As Vice-President of the European Parliament, she played a key role in the LUX Prize (now the LUX Audience Award), the European Parliament's flagship film prize, designed to promote cultural diversity and spark debate on social and political issues and intercultural communication through cinema.

Kratsa-Tsagaropoulou was centrally involved in the planning and oversight of the House of European History. It is an innovative and technologically enabled project about transnational phenomena which have shaped the cultural and political history of Europe. The House of European History, much like the Parlamentarium, was a cornerstone of the communication strategy led by Rodi Kratsa-Tsagaropoulou to bridge the gap between European institutions and citizens by highlighting the continent's shared cultural and political history.

=== National politics ===
==== Local and Regional Governance ====
Kratsa-Tsagaropoulou was elected as a member of the City Council of Athens (Municipality) in 1998 with the faction of Mayor Dimitris Avramopoulos (later Greek Minister of Foreign Affairs, Greek Minister of Defence and European Commissioner of Migration). She was appointed as representative of the Athens Municipality at the network of the European capitals. She was also involved in the municipality strategy for tourism and culture.

Kratsa-Tsagaropoulou was later elected Regional Governor the Ionian islands in 2019. After a long career in European politics, she returned to regional governance and made history as the first woman elected to this post. During her tenure as Governor (2019-2023) she focused on an agenda of sustainable tourism and modern infrastructure development, boosting the local economy and enhancing civil protection while preserving cultural heritage and marine environment. She launched a new infrastructure policy for waste management for each island according to the Green agenda of the EU. In 2021 she founded in collaboration with the Greek government the FODSA of the Ionian islands - Solid Waste Management Body, of which she served as the first President of the Executive Board.

Kratsa-Tsagaropoulou launched The Ionian Film Office, based in Corfu, with the aim of attracting and supporting film and audiovisual productions on the Ionian islands. She signed a memorandum of cooperation between the Ionian Islands Film Office and Mission Cinéma of the Paris Municipality. During her tenure it attracted high quality productions, such as Hollywood feature films The Return and My Big Fat Greek Wedding 3, also Maestro in Blue, the first Greek series featured on Netflix and supported the first sustainable movie in Greece, The Eye. As a Governor, Kratsa-Tsagaropoulou, partnered with regions of neighbouring countries through the European Interreg Programme focusing on projects of Culture, Infrastructure and Climate Change. She was a member of the Greek delegation of the European Committee of the Regions (based in Brussels) and member of the Conference of Peripheral Maritime Regions (CPMR) - Islands commission advocating for an integrated European policy for islands.

During the covid pandemic, the Region of the Ionian islands achieved the highest rate of vaccination, compared to other regions in Greece. The Regional government also supported the local economy from the financial and social consequences of the crisis with various national and European funding programmes.

In 2022 the Region of the Ionian islands ranked at the top of the index of the United Nations Sustainable Development Goals (SDG’s) along with the Thessaly region. As Regional Governor of the Ionian Islands, she supported the Kefalonia-Ithaca Geopark by securing European and national funding through operational programmes and worked for its inscription on the list of UNESCO Global Geoparks.

Kratsa-Tsagaropoulou as a Governor funded and implemented the restoration and the protection of historical monuments, the development of museums and of tangible and intangible cultural heritage and the protection of the Old Town of Corfu (UNESCO World Heritage). She built partnerships with the government, local municipalities and public stakeholders and also collaborated at a strategic level with the UNESCO Chair on Threats to Cultural Heritage and to Cultural Heritage-related Activities at the Ionian University. Kratsa-Tsagaropoulou was named European Climate Ambassador by the European Commission.

== Positions held ==
Kratsa-Tsagaropoulou is a founding member. since 1987, and later President of the International Organization for the Promotion of Women of Europe (Association Internationale, pour la Promotion des Femmes d'Europe - AIPFE) based in Brussels. Through its numerous activities, AIPFE contributed to the positive role of women in society. AIPFE created the annual ‘Women of Europe Award’ recognising women’s role for Europe and also ‘Club de Rhodes,’ an international women's club of reflection on European and global affairs. AIPFE organised the Budapest meeting in collaboration with UNESCO, a joint event for the ‘Women of Europe Award’ laureates to build bridges with women in the newly post-communist societies. This meeting was one of the first major gatherings of women from Western and Eastern Europe following the fall of the Berlin Wall.

In 1989 she founded and was the President of the European Centre for Communication and Information (ECCI) in Athens in order to raise awareness about the project of a united Europe and its citizens. ECCI also organised a national competition of ‘Children designing Europe’ with great participation for three years in a row.

In 2014 she was appointed and served as President of the Konstantinos Karamanlis Institute for Democracy in Greece, a political foundation of promotion of liberal democracy and social market economy, of peace and European integration. Kratsa-Tsagaropoulou was a member of the board since its creation in 1998.

== Other activities ==
=== Boards and Memberships ===
Kratsa-Tsagaropoulou is currently a member in different Boards and organisations:

- Executive Board of the Euro-Mediterranean University of Morocco (Université Euro-Méditerranéenne à Fès - UEMF)
- Member of the UN Alliance of Civilisations Chair at UEMF, founded in Euromed University of Fes
- Member of the International Association SAVE TYR (IAST) and President of the Greek Committee for the protection of the archaeological and cultural heritage of Tyr (Lebanon), a UNESCO World Heritage site, and of the pre-historic civilisations of the Mediterranean
- Member of “Comité Suisse pour la Réunification des Marbres de Parthénon“ and the International Association for the Reunification of the Parthenon Sculptures (IARPS), in accordance to the recommendations and decisions of the UNESCO Intergovernmental Committee for Promoting the Return of Cultural Property (ICPRCP)
- Member of the international Think Tank Nizami Ganjavi International Center (based in Azerbaijan)
- Member of the Group of High Level Experts for the reform of Regional cohesion and policy in the European Union
- Member of the Greek representation at the Congress of Local & Regional Authorities of the Council of Europe (based in Strasbourg)
- Honorary Member of Women's International Shipping & Trading Association (WISTA)
- Honorary Member of International Chamber of Commerce (Greece) Women’s Section

Kratsa-Tsagaropoulou has served as a member to the following ones:

- Member of the Board of the historic European Center of Culture “Centre Européen de la Culture” (Geneva)
- Member of the Cultural Council of the Union for the Mediterranean (French Republic 2009)
- Founding Member of the Francophonie and Cultural Diversity intergroup in the European Parliament
- Founding member and Vice-President of the Greek Committee for the European Movement in Greece
- Member of the Board of the Foundation Marianna V. Vardinogiannis, founded by the late Goodwill Ambassador of UNESCO Marianna Vardinogiannis advocating for Human Rights, particularly on health and education
- President of the Executive Board of FODSA of the Ionian islands - Solid Waste Management Body.
- Member of the national Greek delegation at the European Committee of the Regions of the European Union (based in Brussels)
- Member of Euro-Mediterranean Regional Local Assembly (ARLEM)

=== International Conference Participation ===
In front of the International Monetary Fund (Washington) September 2011

Kratsa-Tsagaropoulou has taken part in fora by the International Monetary Fund and the World Bank as well as a number of international conferences: Crans Montana Forum, Doha Forum (Qatar), WISE Forum (Qatar), Women as Global Leaders Conference (UAE), Education Without Borders (UAE), Festival of Thinkers (UAE), MEDays Forum (Morocco), Club de Monaco (on Mediterranean and Middle East issues), Women in Parliaments in South East Asia (Konrad Adenauer forum), Delphi Forum (Greece). She was particularly active in the UAE Leadership Council.

== Personal and family life ==
Rodi Kratsa-Tsagaropoulou is married to former Member of Greek Parliament and former Minister of Transports and Communications, Apostolos Kratsas. They have two children, George, who studied Law in London (QMUL, LSE) and Paris (Assas II) with a PhD in Financial Law (UCL), and Constance, who studied Law and Economics in London (QMUL, UCL) and holds an MBA from Said Business School (Oxford University).

== Honours and awards ==
Her work has been recognized with several high honors and awards, These include

- Officer of the National Order of the Legion of Honour (Officier de la Légion d'honneur) by the Republic of France - 2009
- Knight of the National Order of the Legion of Honour (Chevalier de la Légion d'honneur) by the Republic of France - 2004
- Commander of the National Order of the Cedar by the Republic of Lebanon - 2010
- Anna Lindh Award for the Dialogue Between Cultures - 2007
- Doctor Honoris Causa of the Euro-Mediterranean University of Slovenia (EMUNI) - 2010
- Doctor Honoris Causa of Sidi Mohamed Ben Abdellah University of Fes, Morocco - 2011
- Elissa Didon Prize for Women’s Empowering by International Association SAVE TYR (IAST) - 2014
- 'Champion' for the Protection of the Jordan River by the international NGO ‘Friends of the Earth - Middle East’ - 2010
- MEDays Award for education, culture and research in the Mediterranean area, Morocco - 2010
- Member of the Academy Studium of Casale Monferrato (Accademia di Casale e del Monferrato per l'Arte, la Letteratura, la Storia, le Scienze e le Varie Umanità), Italy - 2010
- Gold Medal by the University of the Aegean, Greece - 2009
- WISTA’s Personality of the Year by Women’s International Shipping & Trading Association (WISTA) - 2008
- Lady “Archontisa” of the Greek Orthodox Patriarchate of Alexandria and Africa, Theodoros II
- Knight “Stavroforos” of the Holy Sepulchre by the Patriarch of Jerusalem, Theophilos III
