= Tyler Jo Smith =

Archaeologist, academic, and author (born 1967)

- Born: April 4, 1967 (age 59)
- Occupations: Archaeologist, academic, and author

Academic background
- Education: Davidson College; University of Oxford
- Academic advisor: John Boardman

Academic work
- Institutions: University of Virginia

Tyler Jo Smith (born April 4, 1967) is an archaeologist, academic, and author. She is a professor of classical art and archaeology in the Department of Art as well as the director of the Interdisciplinary Archaeology Program at the University of Virginia.

Smith is most well known for her contributions to classical archaeology and the archaeology of the Eastern Mediterranean, particularly in the realms of ancient Greek pottery and material culture. Her work extends to landscape and survey archaeology, as well as the history of alcohol. She is one of the founders of Kerameikos.org, an initiative focused on Athenian pottery and supported by funding from the NEH, using linked open data. Furthermore, she is the recipient of the Development Award from the Classical Association of the Middle West and South, as well as of multiple teaching awards. Among her authored works are her publications in academic journals, including American Journal of Archaeology as well as books such as Komast Dancers in Archaic Greek Art and Religion in the Art of Archaic and Classical Greece.

Smith is an elected fellow of the Society of Antiquaries of London as well as a senior associate fellow of Institute of Classical Studies. In 2015, she served as a visiting research fellow at the Trendall Centre at La Trobe University in Melbourne. Moreover, in 2017, she was a visiting scholar at L'École des hautes études en sciences sociales in Paris.

== Education ==
Smith earned her A.B. degree in Classical Languages and Literature from Davidson College in 1989, and subsequently pursued an M.Phil in Classical Archaeology at Merton College, Oxford, completing it in 1992. She later achieved a D.Phil. in Classical Archaeology from the same institution in 1997.

== Career ==
Smith began her academic career in 1993 at Virginia Tech in 1997. In 2013 she lectured on ancient Mediterranean Art and Archaeology during a summer voyage of Semester at Sea. From 2018 to 2019, she held the Elizabeth A. Whitehead Professorship at the American School of Classical Studies in Athens. Moreover, she holds the position of professor of classical art and archaeology in the Department of Art at the University of Virginia, and is affiliated faculty in the Department of Classics.

Smith served on the board of directors of the American Research Institute in Turkey. Additionally, she has been a member of the scientific committee for the annual World Congress on Dance Research (UNESCO) in Athens, Greece since 2019. In 2021, she joined the development committee of the British School at Athens, and in 2022, she became a member of the Anthony Fauci Award in STEM and Classics Subcommittee. Moreover, since 2011, she has held the position of director of UVA's Interdisciplinary Archaeology Program.

Smith was a finds specialist at Kato Phano and Knossos, and a pottery and sculpture specialist at the Hacımusalar Höyük Excavations and at Morgantina. She has served as the lab director for the Caesarea Coastal Archaeological Project since 2022 and as the director of its academic programs.

== Works ==
In 2010 Smith authored the book Komast Dancers in Archaic Greek Art. The book provided an analysis of the significance and regional variations of komast figures in ancient Greek art, particularly on black-figure vases, highlighting their association with the worship of Dionysos, the origins of Greek drama, and their role in spreading human figural representation during the sixth century BC. John H. Oakley, in his review of the book said "Smith's monograph is an excellent and thorough study of a popular motif used in archaic Greek art throughout most of the Greek world, and every university library and scholar of Greek vase painting should own a copy of this book. Studies like this take years to complete and are the building blocks for advancing our understanding of Greek art. We need more like this one." Her more recent book Religion in the Art of Archaic and Classical Greece explores the relationship between art and religion in ancient Greek society, focusing on how small-scale art objects depict religious practices and experiences during the Archaic and Classical periods. Moreover, in 2012, she co-edited A Companion to Greek Art with Dimitris Plantzos, which was reissued in paperback in 2018.

== Research ==
Smith, through her research, examined the iconography of Athenian black-figure vases from the Archaic period found at the Berezan archaeological site, discussing their significance in understanding ancient Greek visual culture and societal aspects depicted through themes such as mythology, religion, and everyday life. In related research, she explored the use of Greek vase-painting, particularly early Athenian red-figure dance scenes found on drinking-cups, as a source for understanding ancient Greek dance and performance, emphasizing the benefits of modern online resources for studying dance iconography.

Smith's 2014 publication with Ethan Gruber explored applying linked open data methodologies to create a discipline-specific thesaurus for Greek pottery, integrating existing vocabulary systems, and demonstrating its utility through web-based tools for data analysis and visualization. In the same year, she also provided a multi-faceted approach to teaching death in the classroom within the context of Classical studies, focusing on ancient Greek culture, aiming to address discomfort through contextualization, visual and material evidence, and various teaching techniques. Later, in 2018, she explored the importance of rock-cut votive reliefs in Pisidia, analyzing their modern recovery, permanency in landscape, devotional significance, and cross-regional relevance, highlighting their enduring significance beyond antiquity. In 2020, she authored a book chapter in the book titled The Cambridge Companion to Ancient Athens, wherein she examined the diverse roles and significance of animals in ancient Athenian society, drawing from sources such as texts, inscriptions, archaeology, and visual arts, with a focus on their involvement in everyday life, mythology and religion, as well as performance and competition. Her 2022 work in a volume in honor of Gocha R. Tsetskhladze examined an Athenian black-figure skyphos featuring three Gorgons, analyzing its iconography, audience, cultural context, connection to Perseus, figure poses, potential performance relevance, and its discovery on Berezan. Her more recent work surveyed recent publications (2017–2023) on ancient Greek art, categorizing them by themes and materials, and concludes with observations on prevalent subjects like the body, aesthetics, religion, and intercultural connections.

== Awards and honors ==
- 2010 – Award for Excellence in College Teaching, Classical Association of the Middle West and South.
- 2013–2014 – Student Council Distinguished Teaching Award, University of Virginia.
- 2021 – Z Society Distinguished Faculty Award, University of Virginia, 2021.
- 2022 – Jefferson Scholars Foundation Award for Excellence in Teaching, University of Virginia.

== Bibliography ==
=== Books ===
- Komast Dancers in Archaic Greek Art (2010) ISBN 9780199578658
- A Companion to Greek Art, with D. Plantzos (2012; 2nd edn. 2018) ISBN 9781119266815
- Religion in the Art of Archaic and Classical Greece (2021) ISBN 9780812252811

=== Selected articles ===
- Smith, T. J. (2009). "East Greek pottery in the collection of the British School at Athens". The Annual of the British School at Athens, 104, 341–360.
- Smith, T. J. (2011). "Highland gods: Votive reliefs from the Pisidian Survey". Anatolian Studies, 61, 133–150.
- Smith, T. J. (2014). "Myth, cult, and performance: Sir John Soane's Cawdor Vase". Bulletin of the Institute of Classical Studies, 57(1), 96–123.
- Smith, T. J. (2018). "Interaction, cult and memory: Another look at the rock-cut votive reliefs of southwest Anatolia". Colloquium Anatolicum, 17, 119–136.
- Smith, T.J. (202). "Orchesis Kallinikos: Lillian B. Lawler's Greek Dance Legacy", Classical World 113, 197–222.
- Smith, T. J. (2021). "Bodies in Motion: Dance, Gesture, and Ritual on Greek Vases", Greek and Roman Musical Studies 9, 49–84.
