= Accademia di Casale e del Monferrato per l'Arte, la Letteratura, la Storia, le Scienze e le Varie Umanità =

Academy in Italy

The "Studium", or in full the Accademia di Casale e del Monferrato per l'Arte, la Letteratura, la Storia, le Scienze e le Varie Umanità (Casale and Monferrato Academy for Art, Literature, History, Sciences and the Various Humanities), was significant in the Middle Ages as a major center in Casale Monferrato for academic and scholarly achievement. It possessed several scientific sections devoted to science, history, literature, music and art.

The Academy was founded in 1476 by Guglielmo VIII Paleologo, Marquis of Montferrat. Over time, the society witnessed a slow and inexorable decline. However, in 1978, the academy was revitalized by a group of scholars, scientists and academicians who wished to advance its cause in international culture.

Alfredo degli Uberti (1923-2007) served as the academy's pro-rector from 1980 till 2002. degli Uberti, a knight of several noted chivalric orders (Equestrian Order of the Saint Gregory the Great, The Sacred Military Constantinian Order of Saint George and honorary member of the Accademia di Marina di Santo Stefano di Pisa) also served as vice-president of Kiwanis Club of Casale Monferrato (1978-1979). From 1981 to his death in 2015, the President of the Senato Accademico has been Infante Carlos, Duke of Calabria, Head of the House of Bourbon-Two Sicilies. From November 2015 Presidency has been taken over by H.R.H. Maria Teresa di Borbone Parma (1933-2020). From 2012 the pro-rector is Maria Loredana Pinotti.

Today, the academy conducts numerous conferences as well as producing several scientific publications. In April of each year, the Academy holds an international meeting of leading Italian and corresponding scholars.

== Membership ==
Election to the Academy is by nomination of three academicians and majority ballot. The Studium has less than 40 academicians of which several are Nobel Prize laureates.

== Notable members ==
Arts

- Pietro Annigoni
- Venanzo Crocetti
- Luciano Minguzzi
- Marco Horak

Diplomats

- Andrea Cordero Lanza di Montezemolo
- Prince Nikolaus of Liechtenstein
- Laurent Stefanini
- Marcia Covarrubias Martínez

History

- Vicente de Cadenas y Vicent
- Jacques Le Goff
- Eric Mension-Rigau

Music

- Massimo Mila
- Carolina Murat

Science

- Rita Levi Montalcini
- Salvador E. Luria
- Guido Peter Broich
- Paolo Adravanti

Literature

- Eugenio Montale
- Mario Luzi
- Alessandro Cutolo
- Ignazio Silone
- Giuseppe Pittano
- Nantas Salvalaggio
- Mohamed Salmawy

Statesmen

- Riccardo Triglia
- Otto von Habsburg
- Walburga Douglas
- Giovanni Goria
- Giovanni Spadolini
- Pier Luigi Romita
- Angelino Alfano
- Gianfranco Micciché
- Guido de Marco
- Sandro Pertini
- Rodi Kratsa-Tsagaropoulou
- Prince Leka of Albania
- Apostolos Kratsas
- José Ramos-Horta
- Antonio Tajani

Various Humanities

- Valentina Cortese
- Peter Kolosimo
- Owana Salazar
- Ilias Lalaounis
- Fabrizio Menchini Fabris
- Sami Aldeeb
- Emma Viora di Bastide Zavattaro Ardizzi
- Giovanni Tonucci

Public Entities

- International Committee of the Red Cross
- Royal College of Spain in Bologna
- Istituto Superiore Statale "Leardi" in Casale Monferrato
- Real Hermandad de Nobles Espanoles de Santiago en Naples
- Corpo militare della Croce Rossa Italiana
- Corpo delle infermiere volontarie della Croce Rossa Italiana
- Real Asociación de Hidalgos de España
