= MEDays =

Annual international forum in Tangier, Morocco

MEDays : The Southern Forum
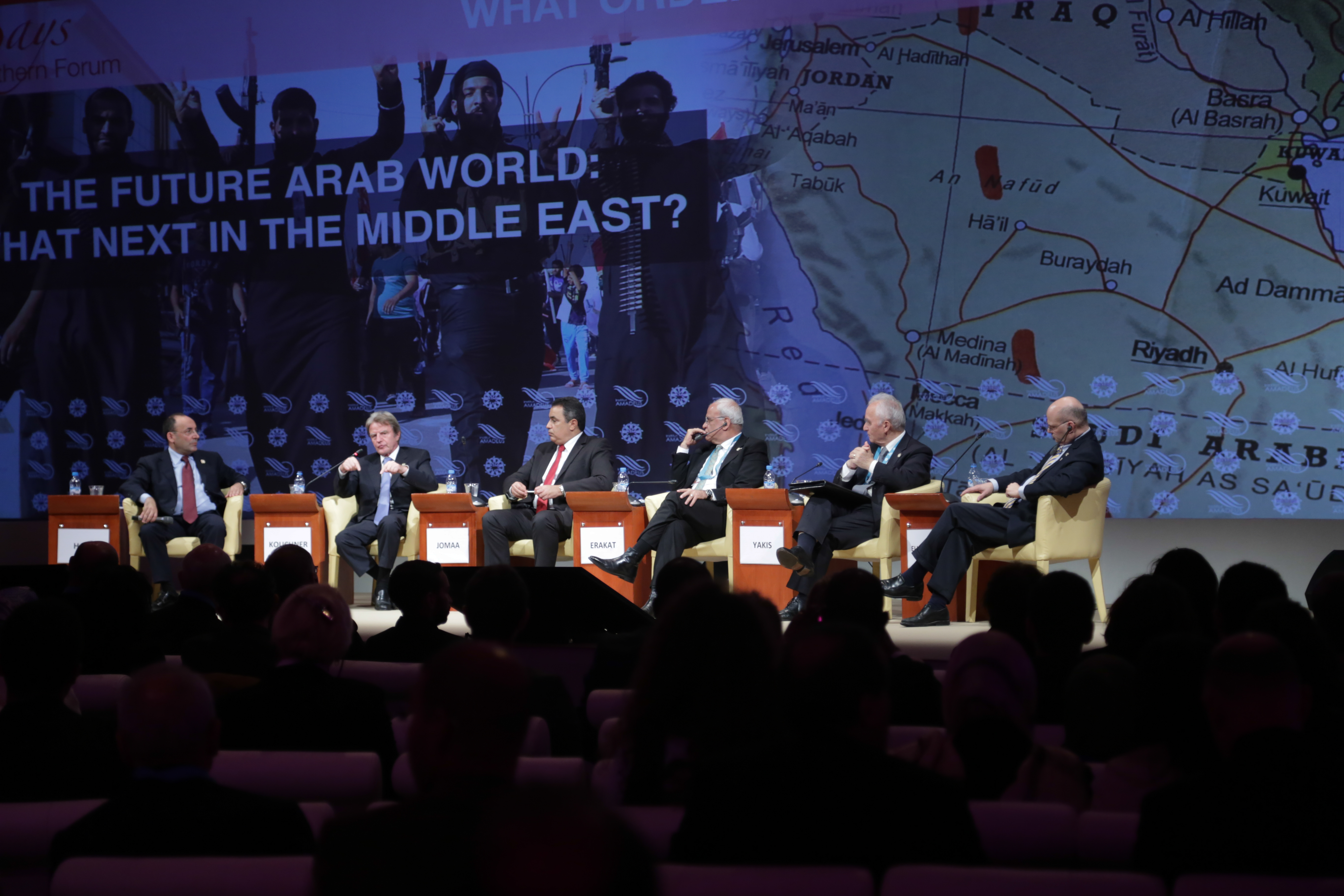
- Location: Tangier
- Founded: 2008
- Leader: Brahim Fassi Fihri
- Patron: Mohammed VI of Morocco
- Organizer: Amadeus Institute
- Website: www.medays.org

MEDays is an annual international forum which is organized every year in Tangier under the patronage of King Mohammed VI, and is the main event organized by the Amadeus Institute. During several days, it confronts and brings together different readings, opinions and recommendations from high level international policymakers on essential topics and issues concerning the South. The Amadeus Institute organized the ninth edition of the international MEDays Forum from 7 to 10 December 2016.

Today the MEDays Forum is considered a strategic meeting for global players involved in the geostrategic, political, economic and social spheres of southern countries and more specifically the Mediterranean, African and Arab regions - but also with an opening on the Latin American regions and Asia. The South has now its own forum. According to the president of the Amadeus Institute, 'The MEDays has fulfilled a gap in this geographic zone and is a catalyst for world economy.'

A community of more than 200 speakers of high standards is present each year at the MEDays forum and participates in more than twenty panels to open up practical propositions and concrete sectoral solutions. Among them are heads of states and ministers, government officials, entrepreneurs, representatives from intergovernmental organizations, experts and civil society representatives.

More than 2500 participants attend the Forum include governmental representatives, public administrators, business leaders, researchers and graduate students, civil society and international governmental experts.

== Format ==
Far from being a traditional conference, the MEDays format is closer to a TV broadcast debate: speakers do not make presentations, instead they respond to solicitations and enquiries from the moderator. In parallel panels, the format is slightly different as the audience can interact directly with experts on the panel.

The MED ays offers a parallel business forum "Business MED ays" composed of plenary sessions, workshops and informal meetings, dedicated to business participants. Business MED aysis unique single space to create practical and concrete business opportunities in the various geographical areas with close interest to the Forum.

== MEDays 2008 : the launching ==
The 2008 MEDays edition, 'The Southern Forum for a New Mediterranean’ took place in Tangiers on 26, 27 and 28 November. This was marked by a regional context coinciding with the launching of the Union for the Mediterranean in Paris on 13 July 2008.

This first edition had as its principal theme The Union for the Mediterranean, which aimed to firstly stimulate a better understanding of questions relevant to political, economic and social trials regarding the region, in order to implement this new concept of the Mediterranean.

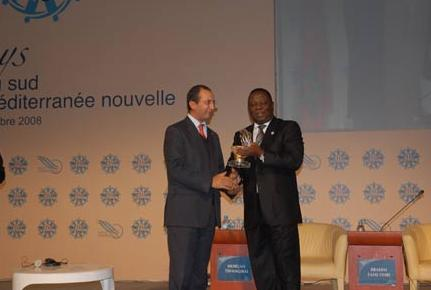
Morgan Tsvangirai won the « MEDays Award 2008 »

More than 500 participants took part in this first edition. A community of high level speakers coming from all around the Mediterranean and from Africa and North America animated panels with strong debates and innovative propositions. Among them, one could find government representatives, policymakers, public administrators, and CEOs, university graduates, researchers, civil servants and experts from intergovernmental organisations.

The first MEDays forum kept its promise. Discussions from panels and remarks made by high-level personalities resulted in a series of propositions addressed to southern Mediterranean countries.

Reflections carried out by the 2008 MEDays led to a common engagement via the declaration of Tangiers, which was communicated to all the main political and economic decision makers from the region. The declaration insisted on the specific character of the Mediterranean identity as an important component of in shaping the citizen coming from the Mediterranean region.

Participants from the forum have also called on Algeria to go back to a return of reason and to spirit of responsibility with regards to the normalization of its relations with Morocco. As a pressing measure, they recommended the urgent reopening of the border frontiers between the two countries. The Amadeus Institute was equally engaged in encouraging actions intended to harmonize legislation between the two shores of the Mediterranean.

== MEDays 2009 : the consolidation ==
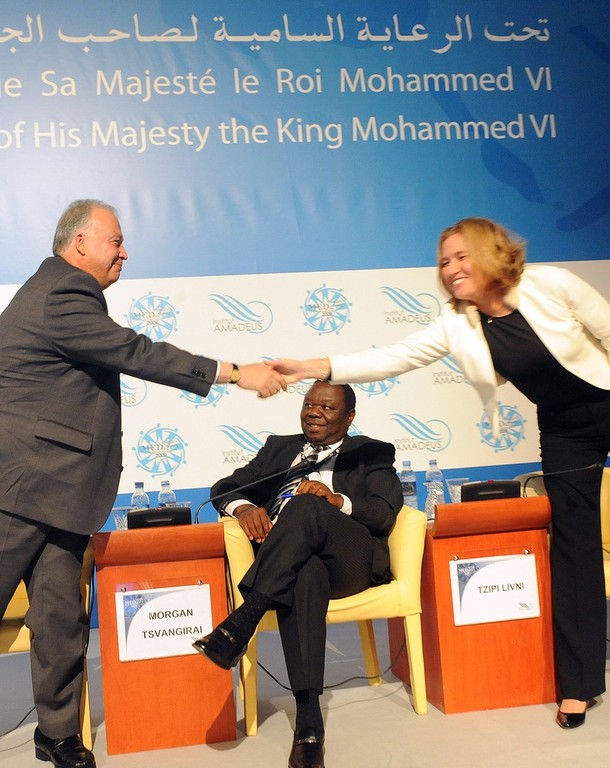
Tsipi Livni and Rafik Houssaini shake hands before the Middle East special session of the MEDays Forum 2009

The main theme of the 2009 MEDays Forum was "responsible co-development". For its second edition, MEDays gathered 174 speakers and 1300 participants. Ministers, high executives and civil society representatives from more than 70 different counties animated the discussions during those three days. Similarly to 2008, the forum architecture was composed of 6 plenary sessions and 20 simultaneous panels.

Participation and media coverage improved dramatically from one year to another, which confirmed MEDays as a valuable event especially considering the quality of speakers, the great freedom of speech and an outstanding logistic organization.

Success was proved by great interest in the chosen themes, the high standard of speakers and the innovative propositions put forward by speakers, an essential factor to affect policy making in the region.

The Forum provided an opportunity for discussion on the roots of the global economic crisis and its effects on the region. The participation of officials involved in shaping their countries' policies was considered relevant to the organization of the event, which sought to foster an exchange of views and direct personal contact among participants.

Given all these developments, this explains why the MEDays Forum has become a valuable place to tackle issues pertaining to the South.

=== Debates that are breaking taboos ===
==== Restarting an Israeli-Palestinian dialogue in total crisis ====
Many observers were surprised by the achievement of the MEDays Forum which managed to bring together on the same panel the former Israeli Minister of Foreign Affairs Tzipi Livni and Rafic Husseini who at the time was the director of the PA cabinet of the Palestinian president Mahmoud Abbas. This is the first time that an Arab country gathers in an informal setting and in a visible manner official representatives from both parties.

==== Dealing with drug traffickers’ danger in Africa's Sahel-Saharan zone ====
Cocaine from South America, bound for Europe, transits through the African continent where local conflicts, the absence of strong states, corruption and poverty facilitates this process. Heroin from Asia is traded for cocaine in a very porous Sahel-Saharan area based on « one for one », creating de facto a kind of new currency in the region. Drug trafficking evolving from caravan transport to super jumbo, is becoming stronger not just as a result of international organized crime but due to terrorists’ activities in the Sahel-Saharian region.

=== Innovative proposals ===
==== An observatory monitoring conflicts’ breakout in Africa ====
The MEDays Forum proposes an original architecture in terms of conflict prevention: the creation of an observatory monitoring conflicts breakout in Africa with regional antennas. The purpose of this observatory would be to launch alert messages on harmful political developments in any African country. Managed by African contingents under UN supervision, the observatory could take action by addressing a direct diplomatic message to authorities or different political parties from countries where the political situation is worsening.

==== A contribution on shipped merchandise in the Mediterranean ====
70% of boats crossing through the Mediterranean do not stop at harbors along the coast. They use the maritime space without contributing economically in the countries of the periphery and mobilize resources since they benefit from maritime security and other services, generating more costs for collectivities and greater risks of pollution. A contribution of €0.5 per ton of shipped merchandise withdrawn at the Suez and Gibraltar Detroit would generate €500 million in its first year.

==== Mediterranean Investment Bank ====
The creation of a Mediterranean Investment Bank that could finance investments and cooperation projects in the Mediterranean region was at the heart of proposals presented at the MEDays 2008 and 2009. An agreement was reached between large financial institutions from Member countries of The Union for the Mediterranean and a schedule and deadline were introduced for the creation of such a bank. Charles Milhaud, present at the MEDays in 2009, was asked by Nicolas Sarkozy to work on the potential financing of Co-development within the UfM framework in order to define the possibility of creating the Mediterranean Investment Bank.

== MEDays 2010 : the durability ==
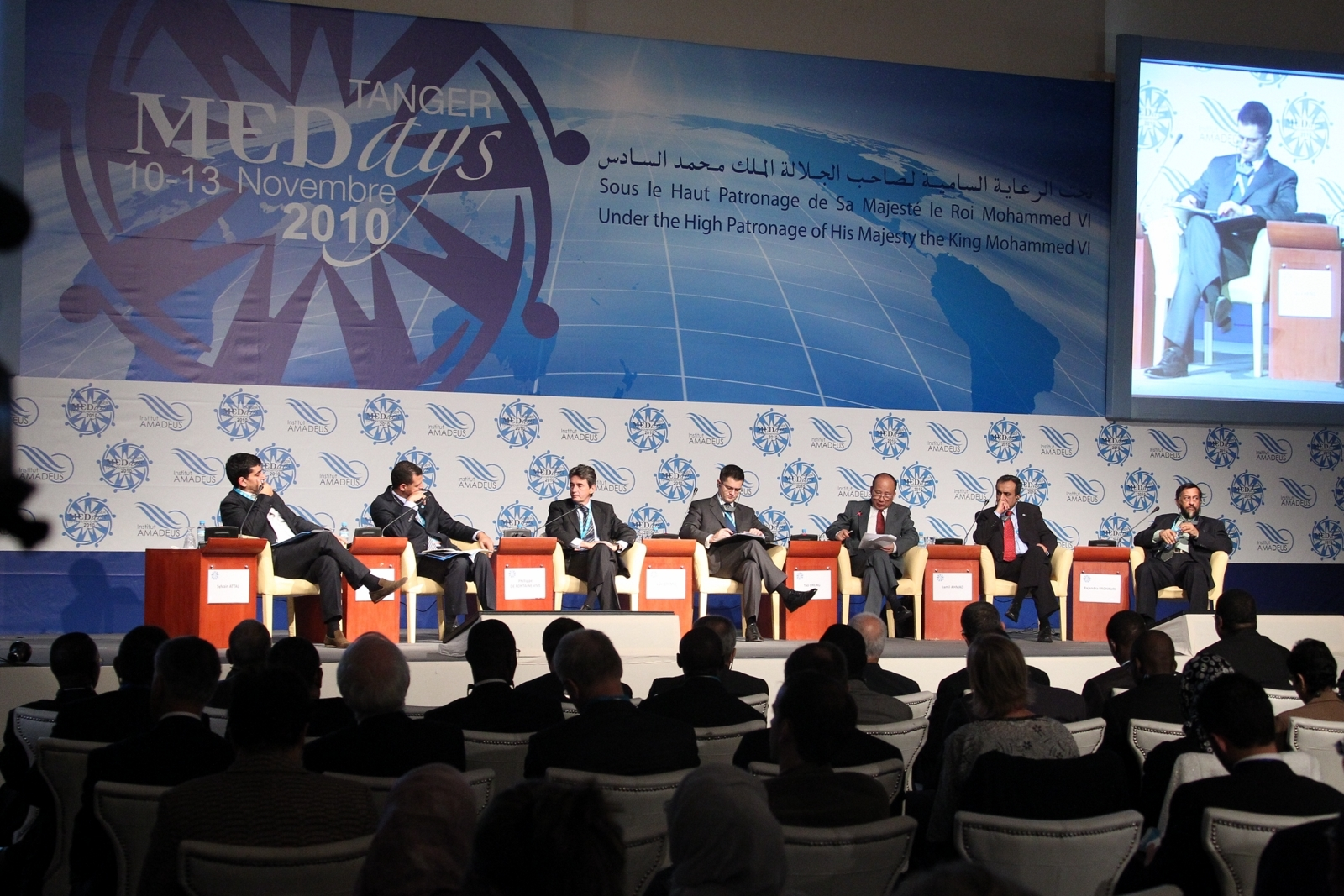
View of a plenary session at the MEDays 2010

The third edition of MEDays had as an objective to render this forum durable as a major event on the international agenda and more importantly to make of it the reference reunion of the South region. New horizons of interregional cooperation were at the heart of the debates, especially the tricontinental, also called the "3A": Africa, South America and Asia. In 2010, almost 200 speakers coming from more than 80 countries as well as 1500 participants (around 40 ministers and 100 journalists) gathered in Tangier. The third edition of MEDays allowed the Forum to be listed for good in the agenda of important international conferences.

The outcome of this third forum confirms its place among the most prestigious annual international conferences: over 175 high level personalities took part in this third MEDays Forum including Edmund Phelps, 2006 Economy Nobel Prize winner, Dr. Rajendra Kumar Pachauri, chair of the Intergovernmental Panel on Climate Change that was jointly awarded the 2007 Nobel Peace Prize, Cheick Sidi Diarra, UN Deputy Secretary General and Special adviser for Africa, Rodi Kratsa-Tsagaropoulou, Vice President of the European Parliament, Angelino Garzón, Vice President of Colombia, Saeb Erekat, Chief Negotiator of the Palestinian Authority, Philippe de Fontaine-Vive, Vice President of the European Investment Bank, over forty ministers and many other prestigious guests coming from over 80 countries.

Many national and international media have covered the Forum, including among others BBC, Euronews, France 24, RFI, Al Hayat, El Pais, Jeune Afrique, Les Afriques, New African, New York Times, The Daily China and The Times.

=== MEDays 2010 outcomes ===
The closing of these four days of work offered the opportunity to communicate its first conclusions, synthesized by the Chairman of the Amadeus Institute in six key recommendations from the 2010 Tangier Declaration:

- Work tirelessly in favor of greater coordination between countries of the South, all
- Call heads of state to recognize the creation of a Palestinian State based on the 4 June 1967 borders
- Move from north–south dialogue to joint action, in a spirit of co-responsibility
- Develop technical and scientific cooperation between countries of the South, with the support of the North to provide the scientific instruments necessary to find solutions to the specific problems faced by the South
- Pursue and deepen regional and sub-regional integration efforts through the definition of integrated sectoral and territorial strategies
- Take into account, in all investments and politics, the importance of training, capacity building and the exchange of good practices and accelerate engagements in favor of education for all

The day before, Miguel Ángel Moratinos former Spanish Minister of Foreign Affairs, publicly called heads of states throughout the world to recognize the Palestinian State as a solution to resolve the conflict, the peace process being frozen as a result of the Israeli decision to suspend the moratorium on settlements.

=== MEDays 2010 Awards ===
Four awards presented at the MEDays 2010 were attributed to:

- The MEDays Distinguished Award recognizes a personality representing the values of peace and democracy. It was attributed to Dr Abdullah Abdullah for his courageous choice to abandon the presidential electoral competition in 2009 even though he was in second position. Dr. Abdullah Abdullah has put political interest aside to preserve Afghanistan's stability and general interest.
- The MEDays Award for Environment & Sustainable Development recognizes the action of a personality playing an imperative role in terms environment protection and sustainable development worldwide. It was attributed to Dr. Rajendra Kumar Pachauri, for his initiatives and his work as the head of the Intergovernmental Panel on Climate Change (IPCC). This award intends to stress the urgency to take immediate decisions to face up to climate challenges, while rethinking the conclusions of the IPCC report.
- The MEDays Award for Education, Culture & Research recognizes the action of a personality playing an imperative role for the development of education and culture. It was attributed to Mrs. Rodi Kratsa-Tsagaropoulou, vice president of the European Parliament, for her involvement in euro-Mediterranean exchanges with regards to higher education. One of her great achievement is the recent creation of the Euro-Mediterranean University of Fes.
- The Young Entrepreneur Business Award encourages young entrepreneurs' initiatives in the MENA region. This new award was attributed for the first time to Mr. Youssef Chraibi. This young businessman co-founded Marketo.com when he was only 24, and created Outsourcia in 2003, a Moroccan company specialized in managing customer relations and in externalizing companies’ services. Moreover, he is chairman of the Moroccan Association of Customer Relations. This award is presented in partnership with the Geneva-based International Trade Center and the Euromed Capital Forum.

== MEDays 2011 : the confirmation ==
The 4th edition of MEDays took place in a historically exceptional context at the national, regional and international levels. 2011 has been a year of unprecedented upheavals, both fortunate and unfortunate. From January onward, the Arab world has been changing rapidly, with the onset of the Arab Spring. The revolutions in Tunisia and Egypt led to the downfall of their respective dictators, and subsequently sparked the uprisings in Libya, Yemen and Syria.

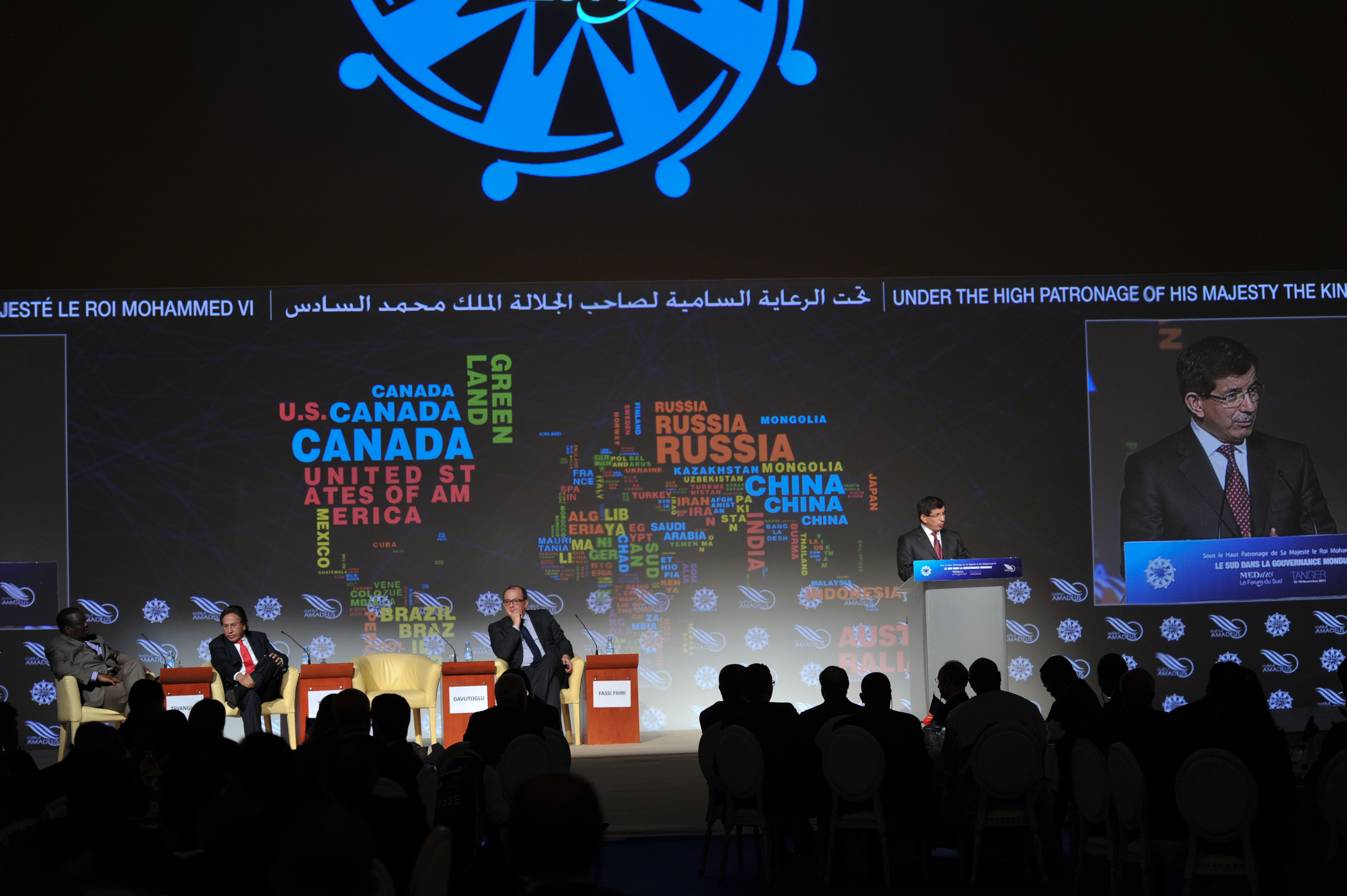
Ahmet Davutoğlu, in the Opening Session of the MEDays 2011 Forum

For the first time, the MEDays Forum brought together the main actors of change in the region with key international decision makers as part of an informal international conference. Key speakers included Ahmet Davutoğlu, the Turkish Minister of Foreign Affairs; Saeb Erekat, Chief Negotiator of the Palestinian Authority; Alejandro Toledo a former President of Peru; Abdel Rahman Shalgham, the Libyan Permanent Representative to the United Nations; Morgan Tsvangirai, the Prime Minister of Zimbabwe; Andrés Pastrana Arango, a former President of Colombia; Sven Alkalaj, the Minister of Foreign Affairs of Bosnia; Bernardino Leon, the Special Representative of the European Union for the Mediterranean; and Cheick Sidi Diarra, the Deputy Secretary General of the United Nations, etc.

In addition to these figures, many ministers from nearly 80 countries also participated in MEDays, including representatives from Mali, Hungary, Liberia, Togo, Benin, Comoros, Senegal, Brazil, Tunisia, Pakistan, China, Dominica, and Grenada.

=== Conclusions ===
The first one is the need for an overhaul reform in governance of the international institutions to better represent emerging countries in the decision-making structures. The second is that the developments and transformations in the Arab world in 2011 clearly showed that there can be no development without economic and social democratic opening. The new transitional governments in the region are facing serious challenges within a global fragile context—building skills, employment, economic growth and equal distribution of wealth.

More than ever, it is necessary for the G20 to accompany the processes of democratic transitions underway in the region. The Union for the Mediterranean, which was definitely burned down on Tahrir Square, must be rethought not only to support the process of democratization but to promote co-development as well. It is therefore imperative to create a new "Pact for Democracy and Development" based on a foundation of shared values and a common economic space. In practical terms, this process must go beyond the hindrances identified in the Euro-Mediterranean partnership since 1995. Because democracy goes hand in hand with development, we do hope that the "Deauville Partnership" will accompany political transitions under way in our countries.

=== MEDays 2011 Award ===
The MEDays Forum is also an opportunity for the Amadeus Institute to reward outstanding initiatives with the MEDays prizes.

Fours prizes have been awarded this year: the MEDays Grand prize, the MEDays prize for the Environment and Sustainable Development, the MEDays prize for Education, Culture and Research, as well as the Business MEDays prize. Through these four prizes, the Amadeus Institute ambitions to single out and promote individuals or people that have made a unique contribution to the South's development. The Grand prize has this year been awarded to the Libyan people and their revolution. The Amadeus Institute felt compelled to acknowledge their sacrifices to win freedom and bring down four decades of dictatorship.

The prize has symbolically been accepted by Abdel Rahman Shalgham, the representative of the Free Libya at the United Nations. The prize was handed out by Zimbabwean Prime Minister Morgan Tsvangirai, the 2008 laureate of the MEDays Grand prize who had pulled out of a contested run off in the 2008 presidential elections in Zimbabwe.

The MEDays prize for Education was awarded this year to the Malian born Cheick Modibo Diarra for his extraordinary achievements in favour of education in Africa. After his career with NASA as an astro-scientist, Dr. Diarra was relentless in promoting free and accessible education for all African youngsters and has been behind the creation of several foundations working on this very issue.

South Korea has been rewarded with the MEDays Prize for the Environment and Sustainable Development. The Institute felt compelled to single out the tremendous efforts undertaken by the South Korean authorities to foster policy initiatives in favour of alternatives energies. Boo Nam Sin, the South Korean Ambassador for Green Growth, accepted the prize at the MEDays forum on behalf of his country.

The Business MEDays prize was awarded to the Attijari Wafabank banking group. As a Moroccan company with business operations across Africa, it represents a generation of domestic businesses with pan-African ambitions. Within a few years, Attijariwafa Bank became the largest bank in the Maghreb region and Senegal, the second-largest in Mali and Benin, and the third-largest in Cameroon and Gabon. It also ranked among the five largest banking groups in Tunisia.

== MEDays 2012 : the maturity ==
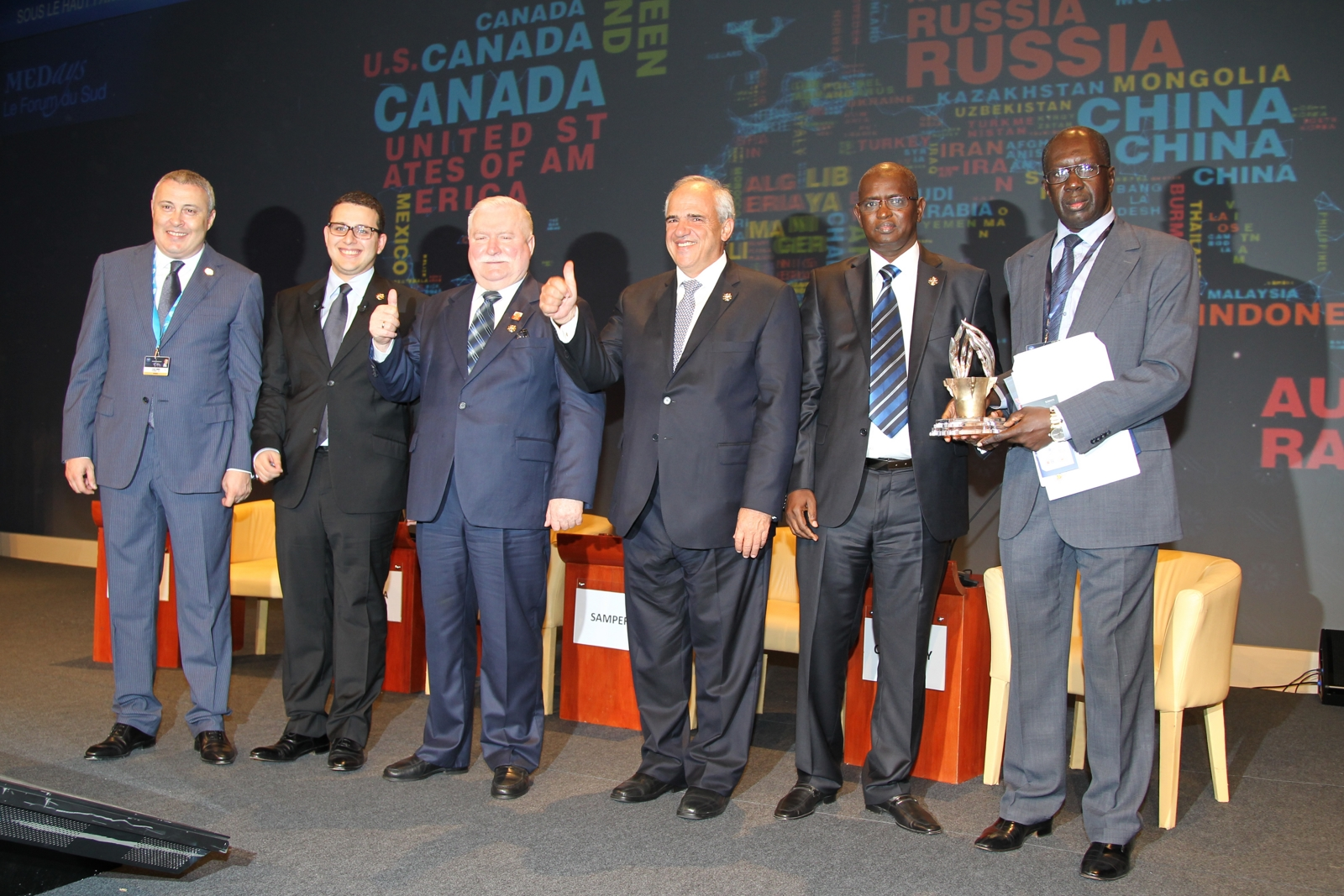
Picture took after the Opening Session of the MEDays 2012 Forum

In the wake of the 2011 edition, MEDays 2012 highlighted major economic and geopolitical issues that raise questions about the advent of new order across the planet. In accordance with its role as the voice for the developing countries, the forum shed light on the reality that the power of emerging countries continues to constitute a key parameter of the new world order.

Two moments strongly marked the 5th edition of the MEDays Forum: the session about Syria and that of Sahel. Syria is at an impasse: the challenge is at national and regional levels. It is even more exacerbated by the sharp fight within the United Nations Security Council where no agreement could be found between, on the one side the United States and Europe –backed up by the majority of Arab countries – and China and Russia on the other side.

Representatives from more than 85 countries attended the 2012 edition. About 30 ministers from Africa (in particular from English speaking Africa), socio-economic and political leaders from Europe, the United States, Latin America, small islands in the Caribbean and the Pacific, as well as significant official delegations from China, Pakistan, the Philippines and Malaysia joined the forum. The MEDays Forum is committed to highlight the active role of emerging markets as the North's key partners in fostering economic growth and to focus on the need for dialogue and north–south cooperation.

Among the key speakers, one will find Lech Wałęsa, Nobel Peace Prize and former President of Poland; José Luis Rodríguez Zapatero, Former President and the Spanish Government; Ernesto Samper a former President of Colombia; Amr Moussa, former Secretary General of the Arab League; Cheick Modibo Diarra, the Prime Minister of Mali at this time; Bernardino Leon, the Special Representative of the European Union for the Mediterranean, etc.

=== Conclusions ===
The uprising of the Syrian population has occurred in the aftermath of the revolutions of the Arab Spring. The Syrian conflict is today dragging on mainly because of the uncertain effects of a change of regime on the regional chessboard but also a balance of power blocked on the ground/field. It is extremely difficult to predict the outcome of the conflict. However, what is certain is that the major challenge for Arab regimes, the Golf petro monarchies and Israel is to break the highly threatening alliance between the Shias in Iran, Damascus and the Hezbollah.

Only a few days after the Doha conference, members of the Syrian opposition came to Tangier in order to take stock of their new strategy for the first time as a single entity.

In the Sahel, the military intervention under the aegis of ECOWAS is inexorable. Not only the preservation of the unity of Mali should be ensured but the whole Sahel-Saharian region should be pacified. Raging terrorism, drug trafficking and organized crime coupled with the emergence of AQIM have made the region a powder keg. Experts and officials in Tangier have all called the international community to support ECOWAS in its efforts to guarantee the territorial integrity of Mali.

The MEDays forum also aims to be operational and for that purpose, it launched the Initiative of Tangier. This year, the Initiative addressed the perilous issue of falsified medicines in Africa. One of its objectives is to sensitize both the populations and the decision makers to the human damages of this deadly traffic and encourage authorities to improve health supervision. In partnership with the main stakeholders, the Amadeus Institute is firmly committed to keep discussing and working on that issue throughout the year.

=== MEDays 2012 Award ===
Every year, the MEDays Prizes are given out to reward individuals, institutions, organizations or companies that have substantially contributed to the development of Southern countries or enhanced north–south cooperation.

In 2012, the MEDays Grand Prize was awarded to Senegal as an acknowledgment of the significant progress made towards democracy and for achieving political stability in an unstable region. The prize has been accepted by the spokesperson of the Senegalese government and President Macky Sall's special envoy to MEDays, Mr. Abdulatif Coulibaly. The 2012 presidential elections in Senegal were a tribute to the vitality of the Senegalese democracy and can serve as a model to both Africa and the international community.

Mr. Karim Helal, the chairman of the Egyptian-ASEAN Business Association, was awarded the 2012 Business MEDays prize for his contribution to the enhancement of economic ties between South Asian emerging countries and Egypt. Fostering exchanges between Asia and Africa could be a crucial value added to the continent's development dynamic. The potential for that is quite substantial: out of the 25% of South- South trade in global exchanges, 85% are made among Asian countries.

The first of its kind, the MEDays Prize for Political Initiative was granted to Mrs. Fawzia Koofi, the Deputy President of the Afghani National Assembly for her strong and continued commitment to the promotion of gender equality in a troubled country, Afghanistan.

The MEDays Prize for Environment was awarded to Turkey for both its efforts to diversify its energy mix through a series of public investments and for its extensive efforts to ensure energy security in an unstable area. Mr. Murat Mercan, Turkey's Vice-Minister for Energy and Natural Resources, accepted the award on behalf of Turkey.

== MEDays 2013: The Globalization ==
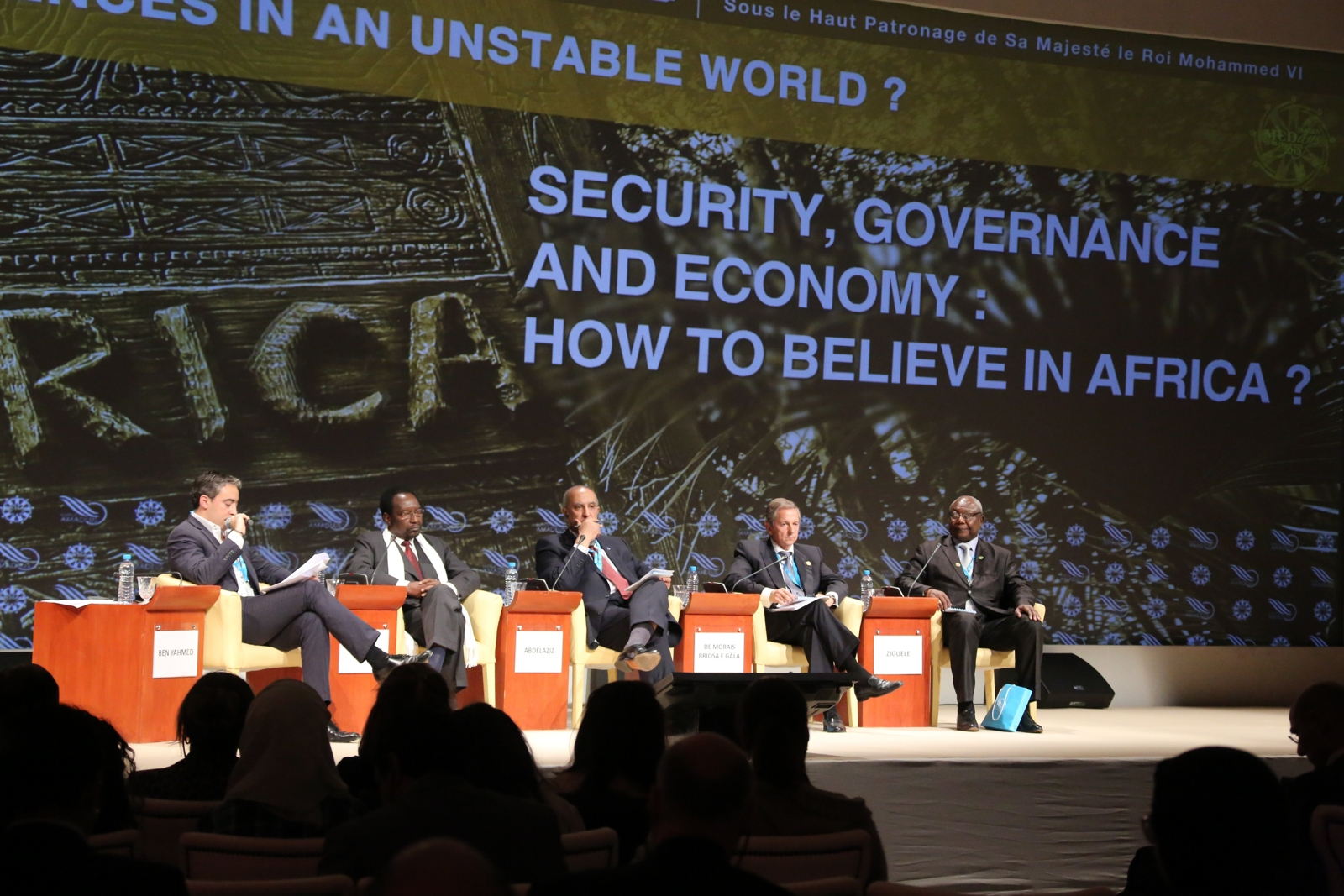
Special Session on African Challenges during the MEDays 2013

The sixth edition of the MEDays Forum had the aim to emphasize the role of emerging countries as key partners of the North to boost economic growth, and the necessity of strengthening north–south dialogue and cooperation. 120 speakers from 50 countries met in Tangier around the theme "What emergences in an unstable world?"

MEDays 2013 was a space for dialogue, exchange, consultation, proposition between international decision-makers and major political and economic actors. As a platform for reflection and debate around different priority problematic and themes, the MEDays Forum was put in place in order to contribute to the international debate in the light of Southern countrie's ambitions (developing and emerging countries). It is, indeed, a committed and forward-looking representative.

Beyond this positioning, MEDays Forum aimed to strengthen the brand image of Morocco at the international level, while putting forward the strategic orientations defined by King Mohammed VI. The forum is also taking an important educational role with Moroccan citizens since the forum is open to the public and welcomes each year around 2500 participants, among them 1000 students in 2013.

Key speakers included Dioncounda Traoré, Stjepan Mesić, Yves Leterme, Bertie Ahern, Mahmoud Jibril, Riyad al-Maliki, and Yvo De Boer.

== MEDays 2014: The Consecration ==
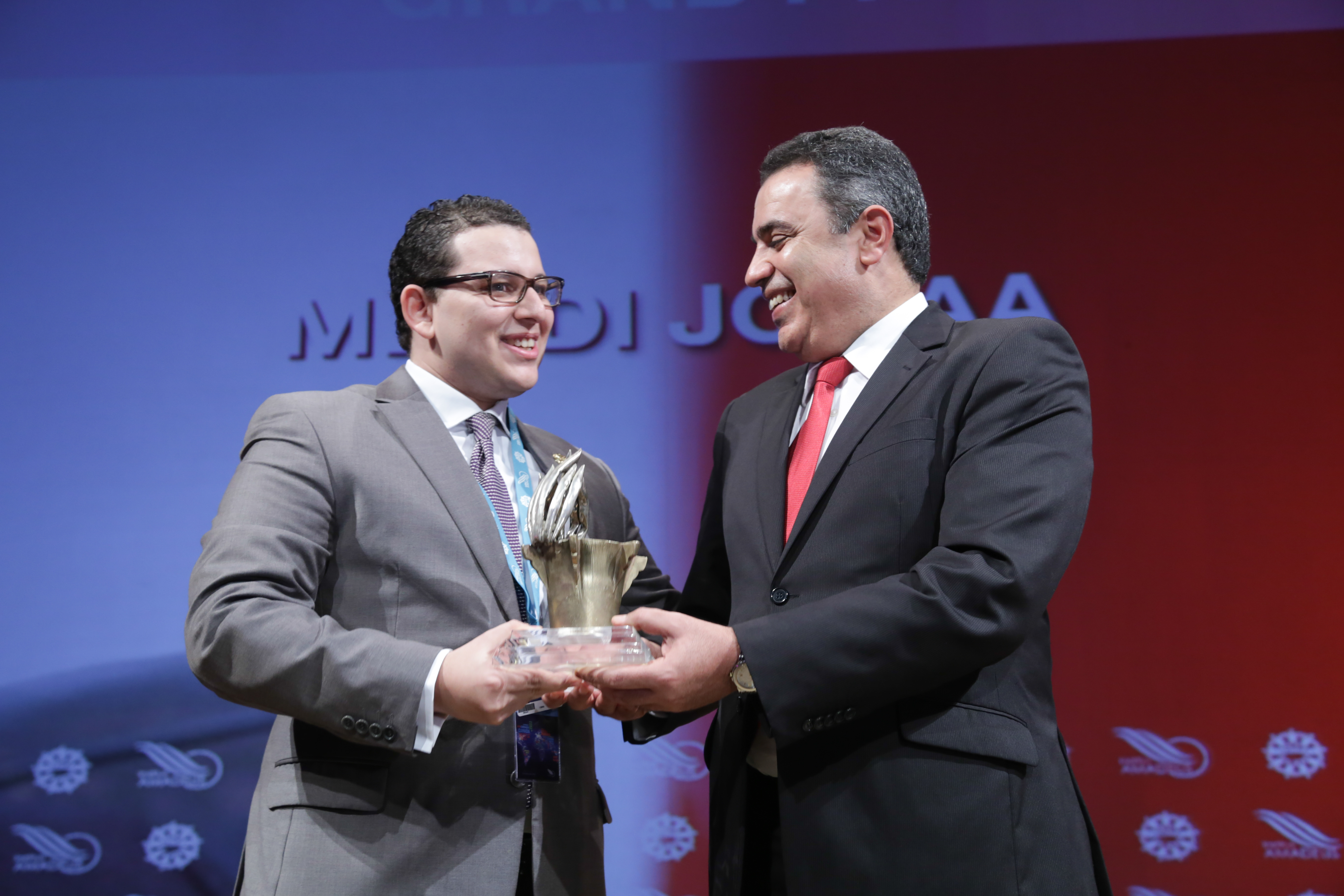
Brahim Fassi Fihri and Mehdi Jomaa during the MEDays 2014

In a difficult regional and international context, MEDays Forum appeared as a necessary platform in the Arab world. The multipolarity of political and security crisis in the South of the Mediterranean, in Iraq, in Ukraine, and in the African continent, have allowed MEDays to be at the heart of international headlines, while enhancing the relevance of the positions taken by Morocco, on the themes addressed. In 2014, around 120 speakers from 72 countries have accepted our invitation to debate around the theme "What order in the chaos?"

MEDays forum in its 7th edition was the occasion; after 4 days of fruitful and sometimes laborious debate, which were often contradictory but always rewarding, to draw up a striking and unanimous finding: the South is at a turning point.

This part of the world enters into a new era, Strengthened by records in terms of governance, and economic results of geostrategic affirmation.

The growth witnessed in Africa and Asia is not always inclusive, and nothing indicates that reforms are going to be sustained, and that they are going to be able to introduce a sustainable socio economic development.

The Middle East is more than ever a powder keg. The recent events in Ukraine bear the scent of the cold war. China is progressing slowly but surely in the international scene. The United Nations are paralyzed and the United States are looking west when Europe, slowed by a socio-economic crisis that strengthens nationalism and populism, has visibly given up to be (trade off) an inevitable actor of the international scene. Facing this disorientation, what legibility in chaos?

Like the three preceding editions, MEDays 2014 was bound to a double context, still very complicated in the global and regional scale. The multiplication (and very often the superposition) of hotbeds, whether they be economic, politic, security, identity, are overturning all frames of reference and evaluation.

Key speakers included Mehdi Jomaa, José Luis Rodríguez Zapatero, Yves Leterme, Enrico Letta, Mahmoud Jibril, Saeb Erakat, Jean-Louis Borloo and Bernard Kouchner.

== MEDays 2015: The Reference ==
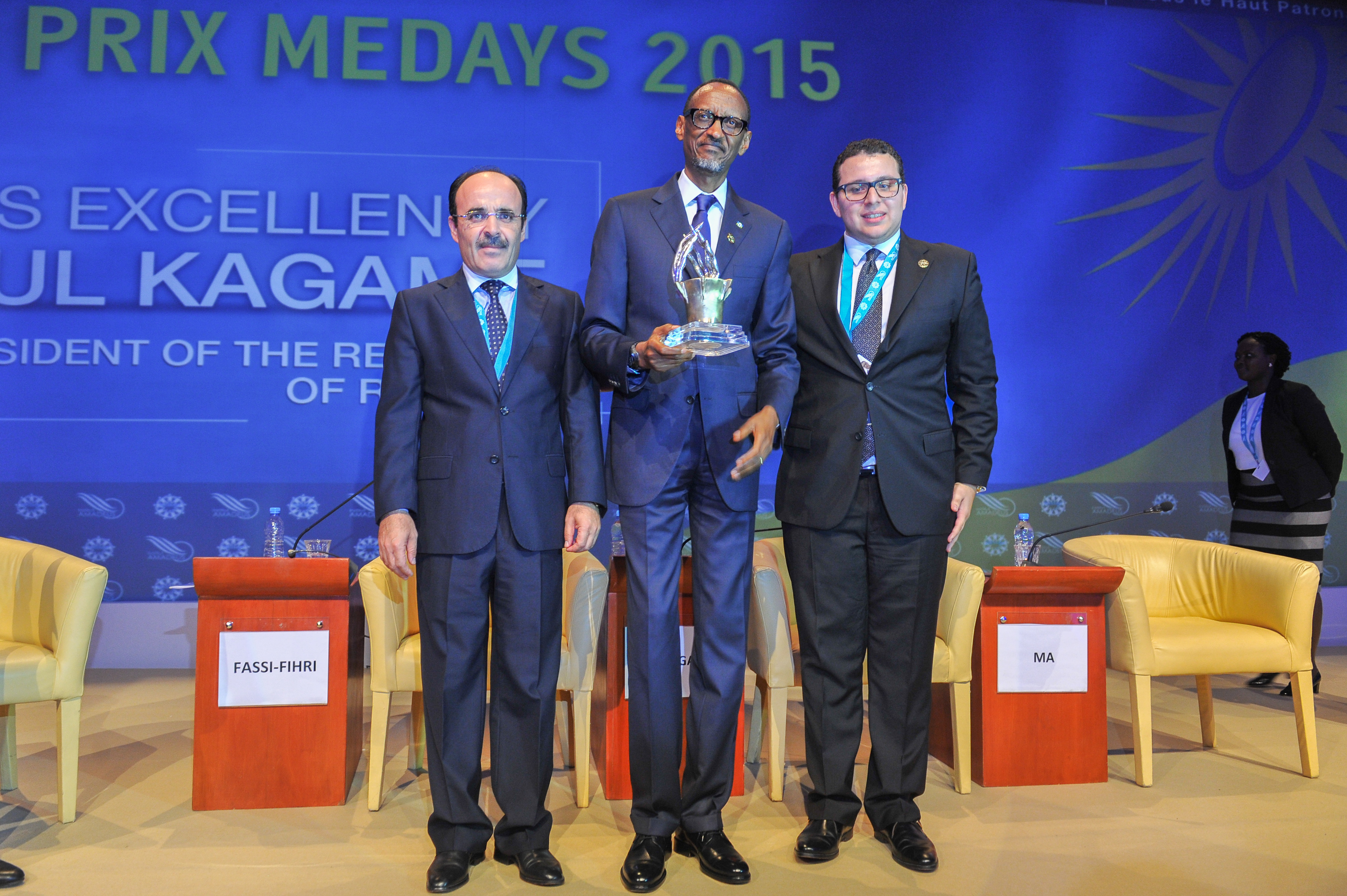
Paul Kagamé receiving the MEDays 2015 Grand Prix with Brahim Fassi Fihri and Ilyas El Omari

Despite a particularly busy international diplomatic agenda (La Valette Summit, Riyadh Summit, G20 Summit, Bani Yas Conference, Dakar Conference on Security were taking place the same week), the 2015 edition of the MEDays forum gathered a community of high level international decision makers. In an effort of diversification, the Amadeus Institute ensured to renew 60% of its speakers in comparison with previous editions.

In some figures, the 2015 edition gathered up to 125 high level speakers, high government representatives (about 30 ministers and foreign officials) and economic decision-makers from 80 countries, 3500 participants among which 1500 Moroccan students and 120 national and foreign journalists. The pertinence of the issues raised as well as the quality of the discussions, perceived as of high quality by observers, the media and the participants have enabled a broad dissemination of the outcomes of the debates both nationally and internationally.

Originally dedicated to geopolitical questions, the last day of the Forum was dedicated to the November 2015 Paris attacks. On this occasion, both national and international media took advantage of the presence of experts and leaders in Tangier to cover and comment the events and discuss in-depth the global fight against the so-called "Islamic State".

Finally, this 2015 edition of the MEDays Forum put a strong focus on Africa by dedicating 10 sessions to discuss different issues pertaining to the continent and address its development and investment opportunities.

Key speakers included Moussa Mara, Mohamed Bazoum, Raila Odinga, Richard Sezibera, Mubarak Muyika, Jean-David Levitte and Cyril Svoboda.
