= Gertrud Seidmann =

Austrian-British art historian, glyptologist, writer and teacher

Gertrud Seidmann FSA FRSA
- Born: 16 September 1919
- Died: 15 February 2013 (aged 93)
- Awards: Goethe Medal

Academic background
- Education: Wolfson College, Oxford

Academic work
- Discipline: Linguist
- Institutions: Battersea County School, University of Oxford, University of Southampton

Gertrud Seidmann, FSA, FRSA (16 September 1919 – 15 February 2013) was an Austrian-British linguist and jewellery historian, specialising in engraved gems.

Her first career was as a linguist, teaching German and applied linguistics at Battersea County School, the University of Oxford, and the University of Southampton: she was awarded the Goethe Medal in 1968. She formally retired in 1979 and dedicated herself to researching jewellery and engraved gems, becoming a research associate of the Institute of Archaeology and of Oxford's Beazley Archive.

In 2004, Seidmann matriculated into Wolfson College, Oxford to study for a Master of Letters (MLitt) research degree. She thereby became the University of Oxford's oldest ever student. She went on to undertake research towards a doctorate in the School of Archaeology. In 2011, due to ill health and at the age of 91, she ended her studies and was awarded a Certificate of Graduate Attainment by the university.

== Honours ==
In 1985, Seidmann was elected a Fellow of the Royal Society of Arts (FRSA). She was elected a Fellow of the Society of Antiquaries of London (FSA) in 1986.

In 1999, a Festschrift was published in her honour: it was titled Classicism to Neo-classicism: Essays dedicated to Gertrud Seidmann, and was edited by Martin Henig and Dimitris Plantzos.

== Selected works ==
- "Nathaniel Marchant, Gem-engraver, 1739-1816". The Volume of the Walpole Society. 53: 1–105. 1987.
- Seidmann, Gertrud (1997). "Person seals in eighteenth- and nineteenth-century England and their antecedents". In Collon, Dominique (ed.). 7000 years of seals. London: British Museum Press. ISBN 9780714111438.
