= Dimitris Plantzos =

Greek archaeologist

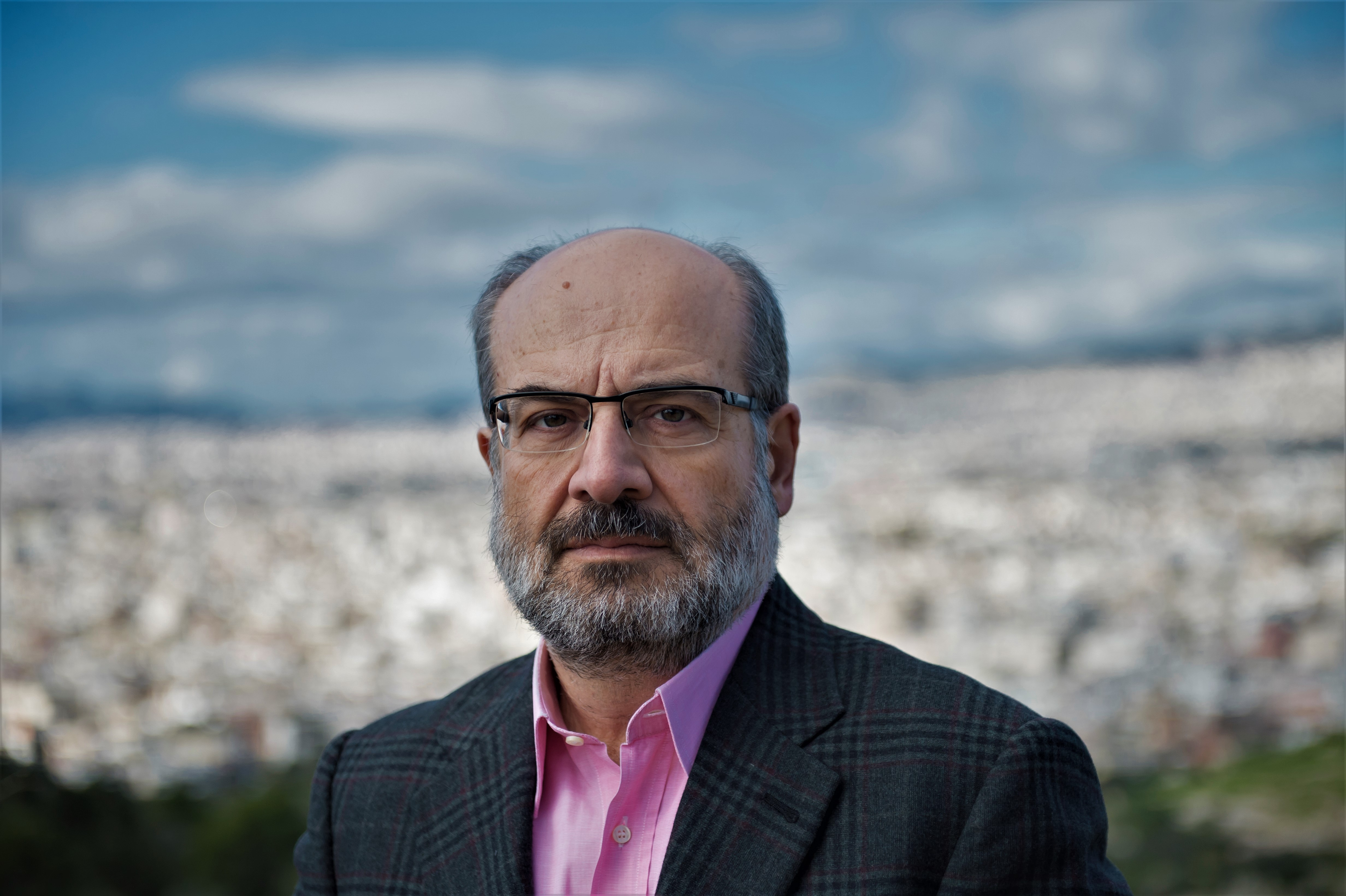

Dimitris Plantzos (Greek: Δημήτρης Πλάντζος) is a classical archaeologist and writer, and Professor of Classical Archaeology at the National and Kapodistrian University of Athens. He specializes in Greek art and archaeology, archaeological theory, and contemporary and modern receptions of classical culture.

== Career ==
After receiving his BA in History and Archaeology from Athens in 1987, Plantzos got an MPhil (1990) and a DPhil (1993) in Classical Archaeology from the University of Oxford. He held a British Academy Post-doctoral Fellowship from 1994 to 1996, and was a curator for the Ilias Lalaounis Jewelry Museum (1997-1998) and the Museum of Cycladic Art (1998-2003) in Athens. Before taking up his current position at Athens, he was Assistant Professor of Classical Archaeology at the University of Ioannina.

Dimitris Plantzos has published articles on a wide variety of topics, including the study of Greek gems and seal-impressions, Greek painting, nationalist uses of classical antiquity in contemporary Greece, archaeology in literature and cinema, and the use of archaeology as a biopolitical instrument in modern societies. His DPhil thesis (1993) appeared as an Oxford Monograph on Classical Archaeology in 1999, titled Hellenistic Engraved Gems. His more recent work includes Greek art and archaeology, 1200 - 30 BC (2016), a classical archaeology textbook published in Greece by Kapon Editions and the US by Lockwood Press, and The Art of Painting in Ancient Greece (2018), produced by the same publishers. Plantzos was also co-editor of Classicism to Neo-Classicism. Essays Dedicated to Gertrud Seidmann (with Martin Henig; Archaeopress: Oxford 1999); A Singular Antiquity. Archaeology and Hellenic Identity in Twentieth-Century Greece (with Dimitris Damaskos; Benaki Museum: Athens 2008); and A Companion to Greek Art (with Tyler J. Smith; Wiley-Blackwell: Malden and Oxford 2018^{2}).

Dimitris Plantzos is co-director (with Dimitris Damaskos) of the Argos Orestikon Excavation Project, and has collaborated with other excavation or R&D projects. He sits on the editorial boards of the Journal of Greek Media & Culture, the Athens University Review of Archaeology, Ex Novo Journal of Archaeology, the Annuario della Scuola Archeologica di Atene e delle Missioni Italiane in Oriente, and the Journal of Modern Greek Studies. Since 2019 he is joint lead (with Gheorghe Alexandru Niculescu) of the Project The Construction of Knowledge in Archaeology and Art History in Southeastern Europe, hosted by the Centre for Advanced Study, Sofia (Bulgaria) and funded by the Getty Foundation as part of the Connecting Art Histories Initiative. During the 2020-21 COVID-19 pandemic, Plantzos co-hosted a series of Webinars on Ancient Greek Painting organized by the American School of Classical Studies at Athens, which was attended globally by thousands of academics, scholars, and ancient-art enthusiasts.

In recent years, Plantzos has been actively participating in public discussions regarding the role of archaeology in contemporary societies, as well as the uses of the classical past in nationalism, post-colonial thinking, and modern and post-modern governmentality.

== Books ==
As author:

- Hellenistic Engraved Gems, Oxford University Press (1999). ISBN 0198150377
- Φιλοστράτου, Εικόνες. Εισαγωγή, μετάφραση και σχόλια, Εκδόσεις Κατάρτι (2006). ISBN 9606671038
- Ελληνική τέχνη και αρχαιολογία, 1200-30 π.Χ., Εκδόσεις Καπόν (2011, 2016). ISBN 9786185209056
- Οι αρχαιολογίες του κλασικού. Αναθεωρώντας τον εμπειρικό κανόνα, Εκδόσεις του Εικοστού Πρώτου (2014). ISBN 9786185118037
- Greek art and archaeology, 1200-30 BC, Kapon Editions and Lockwood Editions (2016). ISBN 9786185209056, 9781937040574
- Το Πρόσφατο Μέλλον. Η κλασική αρχαιότητα ως βιοπολιτικό εργαλείο, Εκδόσεις Νεφέλη (2016). ISBN 9789605041519
- Η τέχνη της ζωγραφικής στον αρχαιοελληνικό κόσμο, Εκδόσεις Καπόν (2018). ISBN 9786185209193
- The Art of Painting in Ancient Greece, Kapon Editions and Lockwood Editions (2018). ISBN 9786185209209, 9781948488051
- Το Χρονικό της Λήμνου. Μύθος - Ιστορία - Κληρονομιά, Εκδόσεις Καπόν (2022). ISBN 9786182180006
- The Story of Lemnos. Myth - History - Heritage, Kapon Editions (2022). ISBN 9786182180013
- Athens Demapped. Archaeology, Heritage, and Urban Transformation, Coimbra University Press (2025). ISBN 978-989-26-2771-7
- Συνέβη στην Αθήνα. Αρχαιολογία, κληρονομιά, αστικές μεταμορφώσεις, Εκδόσεις του Εικοστού Πρώτου (2026). ISBN 978-618-5868-25-3

As editor:

- Classicism to Neo-Classicism. Essays dedicated to Gertrud Seidmann (with Martin Henig, Archaeopress (1999). ISBN 1841710091
- Artists’ Jewellery in Contemporary Europe. A Female Perspective?, Ilias Lalaounis Jewellery Museum (2000). ISBN 9607417119
- A Singular Antiquity. Archaeology and Hellenic Identity in Twentieth-Century Greece (with Dimitris Damaskos), The Benaki Museum (2008). ISBN 9789608347960
- Παγκοσμιοποίηση και εθνική κουλτούρα, Εκδόσεις Αλεξάνδρεια (2009). ISBN 9789602214510
- A Companion to Greek Art (with T.J. Smith), Wiley-Blackwell (2018^{2}). ISBN 9781119266815
- Τέχνη – Χώρος – Όψεις Ανάπτυξης στην Ελλάδα της Κρίσης (with Α. Loukaki), Hellenic Open University (2018). ISBN 9786185259211
- Νόμισμα / Κόσμημα. Χρήσεις – Διαδράσεις – Συμβολισμοί από την Αρχαιότητα έως Σήμερα (with Aik. Liampi and Cl. Papaevangelou-Genakou), Lydia Lithos (2019). ISBN 9789608898523
