= Mubarak Muyika =

Kenyan entrepreneur (born 1994)

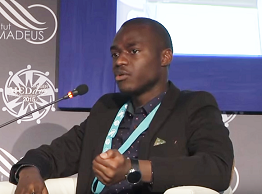
- Mubarak during MEDays 2015 in Tangier, Morocco
- Born: 31 May 1994 (age 32); Western Province, Kenya
- Education: Friends School Kamusinga (High School)
- Occupations: Entrepreneur, programmer, business executive
- Known for: Entrepreneurship

Mubarak Muyika (born 31 May 1994) is a Kenyan-American entrepreneur, computer programmer and business executive based in the Silicon Valley Orphaned at the age of 10, at age 16 Muyika founded Hype Century, a web hosting company which he sold two years later for six figures. He is the founder and CEO of Zagace, a company which runs an app store for businesses to access software for accounting, human resource management, marketing, among other uses.

Forbes listed him as one of Forbes Africa's 30 under 30 both in 2015 and 2017, and he was youngest in Business Insider's list of top young entrepreneurs around the world.

== Early life and education ==
Mubarak Muyika was born in Western Province, Kenya. His father was the district commissioner of Siaya, a senior civil servant, who died when Mubarak was 2, and mother a high school teacher who died when he was 11. Muyika was raised by his mother's sister and her husband in the suburbs of Nairobi.

While a student at Friends School Kamusinga, Muyika won two awards in Kenya's national science fair, the annual Kenya Students Congress on Science and Technology:

In the fair's 48th edition in 2010, he won for a technical whitepaper titled Kahunic infra-photo surveyor, which was presented as a computer talk and ranked first in that category.

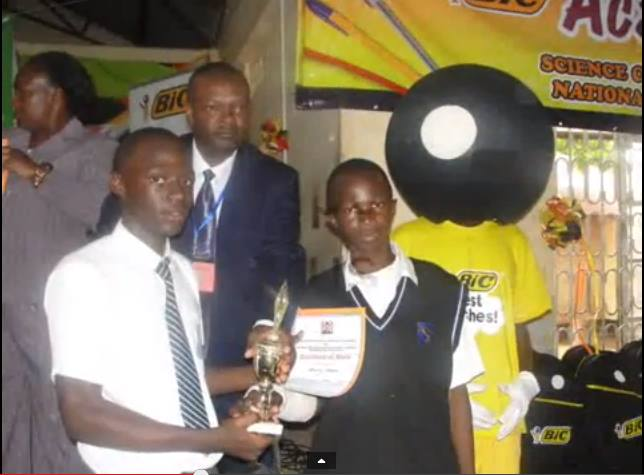
Muyika receiving a national award in the Kenya Students Congress on Science and Technology 2011.

In the fair's 49th edition the following year, Muyika won for a database he developed to manage the flow of petrol and movement of oil tankers. The project's original name in the fair was 'Techno Fibre System', but it was also referred to as 'Enhanced petrol tracker'. It was presented as a computer exhibit in the ICT category, and although Muyika was recognized as the best student in the category, the project was ranked third nationally in the category.

He graduated from Friend's School Kamusinga in 2011.

== Career ==
His adoptive parents operated a small book publishing and distribution company, Acrodile Publishers. Using online resources and technical experience gained in earlier years, Muyika built a better Website for the company.

In 2011, Muyika founded Hype Century Technologies & Investments Limited, a company focused on website creation and webhosting. The following year, for his work in HypeCentury, he received the Anzisha Prize for young entrepreneurs, from the African Leadership Academy.

Muyika sold HypeCentury to Wemps Telecoms in a six figure deal in May 2013. By the time of the sale Hypecentury had 14 employees and was handling over 700 companies with 1400 domains. HypeCentury has since rebranded and is a fully owned subsidiary of Wemps Telecoms.

Later in 2013, Muyika founded Zagace in Nairobi with proceeds from the sale of HypeCentury, with additional funding from investors. Zagace has since raised a number of angel investments from various investors.

In June 2015, Zagace's parent company was restructured as a Delaware-based parent corporation of the same name, with the company now based in San Jose, California. In February 2016, Verdant Capital reported that Zagace was raising additional capital to finance customer acquisition. The company operated an application platform for small and medium-sized businesses, offering enterprise management products covering accounting, inventory, sales, manufacturing, storage and human resources. Verdant Capital acted as financial adviser and arranger for the capital-raising process.

In September 2020, Disrupt Africa reported that Zagace had raised US$16.7 million in seed funding over a four-year period beginning in 2016. The funding was intended to support customer acquisition and international expansion. Investors identified in the reporting included DraperDarkFlow LP, UHT Investments, P Management 415 Inc. and BlackRock. A separate transaction record published by MarketScreener, drawing on S&P Capital IQ data, also recorded a US$16.7 million funding transaction in September 2020.

In the same month Disrupt Africa also reported that Zagace had recorded more than 1.5 million account subscriptions across its products by December 2019 and served approximately 20,000 small-business customers in more than 30 countries. The company's platform included applications for accounting, bookkeeping, payroll, sales, marketing, inventory management and storage. Zagace pursued international expansion through application programming interfaces and software integrations, targeting markets in Africa, the Middle East, Europe and the United States.

In January 2021, Muyika told Yahoo Finance that Zagace served customers in more than 60 countries and generated approximately US$2 million in annual revenue. The company provided application-based enterprise software for businesses seeking to manage their operations online.

In a separate interview published by Yahoo Finance on 28 January 2021, Muyika said that Zagace had nearly two million paying customers. The interview also covered Muyika's views on the role of major United States technology companies, technical expertise and digital infrastructure in supporting the international expansion of technology businesses.

== Personal Life ==
In a report published in November 2025 concerning a tenancy dispute dating to 2023, Kenya Insights identified Niceta Lyimo as Muyika’s fiancée and reported that the two shared a residence in the Kitisuru area of Nairobi.

== See also ==
- List of African millionaires
- List of Internet entrepreneurs
