= Konstantinos Karamanlis Institute for Democracy =

The Konstantinos Karamanlis Institute for Democracy (Greek: Ινστιτούτο Δημοκρατίας «Κωνσταντίνος Καραμανλής») is the official think-tank of the Greek conservative party New Democracy, and named after the party's founder, Konstantinos Karamanlis. It was founded in Athens in January 1998 with the aim of promoting the principles of liberal democracy and the open market in the context of a modern welfare state. It is structured in five departments (International Cooperation, Publications, Events, Research and Political Academy). It is a member of the Wilfried Martens Centre (think tank), the official foundation/think tank of the European People's Party.

== Current structure ==
Chairman

- Rodi Kratsa-Tsagaropoulou

Director General

- Konstantina E. Botsiou

Secretary

- Zetta Makri

Treasurer

- Demosthenis Anagnostopoulos

Board Members

- Alivizatos Petros
- Ioannidis Georgios
- Karloutsos Michael
- Balerbas Athanasios
- Nakou Vasiliki
- Papagelopoulos Demitrios
- Papanastasiou (Mata) Stamatia
- Papastavrou Alexios
- Stefanakis Georgios
- Sofronis Georgios
