= Ilias Lalaounis =

Greek Jeweler

Ilias Lalaounis LH OMRI
- Ilias Lalaounis in 1990
- Born: 4 October 1920; Athens, Greece
- Died: 30 December 2013 (aged 93); Athens, Greece
- Education: University of Athens
- Occupation: Jeweler
- Spouse: Lila Altitzoglou
- Children: 4 daughters

Ilias Lalaounis (4 October 1920 − 30 December 2013) was a pioneer of Greek jewelry and an internationally renowned goldsmith. He is especially known for his collections inspired by Greek history. In 1990 he became the only jeweler ever to be inducted into the Académie des Beaux-Arts.

== Early life ==
Ilias Lalaounis was born on October 4, 1920, in Plaka, Athens, Greece. He was a fourth generation jeweler whose family originated from Delphi. He graduated from the University of Athens, where he studied political science and the Law.

== Career ==
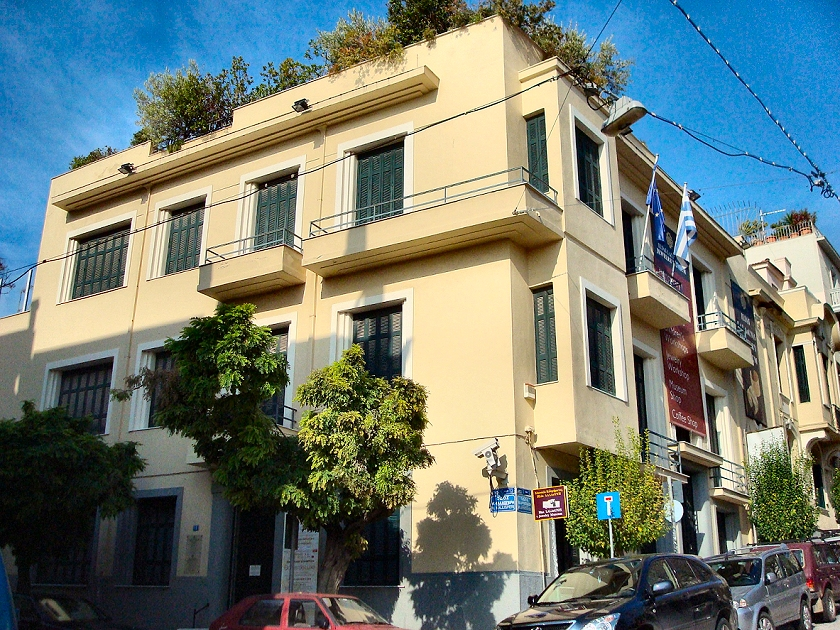
Ilias Lalaounis Jewelry Museum.

Lalaounis started his career working for the jewelry business of his uncle, Xenophon Zolotas. In 1940 he took over the administration of the firm, which he managed and designed all jewelry for until 1968. He founded the Greek Jewelers' Association and exhibited his first collection, the Archaeological Collection, at the Thessaloniki International Fair in 1957. It was inspired by Classical, Hellenistic and Minoan Mycenaean art. In 1969 he started his own firm, Greek Gold - Ilias Lalaounis S.A.

=== 1969-1970s ===
Lalaounis provoked a sensation with his collection Blow Up (1970), draping the human body in gold jewelry inspired by Minoan civilization. The following year he organized an international exhibition of jewelry in Athens, joined by Van Cleef, Bulgari, Rene Kern and Harry Winston. In 1976, he had one of his most important commissions which would prove to be one of the most inspiring for his portfolio. Empress Farah of Iran commissioned Lalaounis to create a collection of jewelry and objects inspired by Persian art, which went on display at the Imperial Palace in Tehran.

Between 1970 and 1978 Ilias Lalaounis opened stores in most European countries. He opened his first international store in Paris at 364 rue Saint-Honoré, near Place Vendôme and produced a short film explaining the sources of inspiration for the jewels on display. Since then, he regularly produced short films to illustrate his collections, such as: Aube of Art, Byzantine Arcs in Gold, Choreography, The Shield of Achilles, Ilion - The Treasure of Troy, Art and Gold, The Common Roots of the Creator Man, Treasures of the Holy Land. In 1979, Lalaounis opened a store in New York on the corner of Fifth Avenue and 57th Street. A year later, the Smithsonian Institution invited him to give a lecture on his art and to exhibit his collection The Achilles Shield at the National Museum of American History.

=== 1980s–1990s ===
Ilias Lalaounis continued to create innovative collections and expand the brand to international markets during the 1980s. On the inauguration of the Lalaounis store in Tokyo, he created a jewelry collection inspired by Japanese art. The same year, he opened a store in Hong Kong where he presented a collection of jewels inspired by the drawings of the Greek geometric period, very similar to the geometric designs of Chinese art. A second store was opened in Hong Kong in 1982. Lalaounis exhibited his Helen of Troy collection at the Penn Museum in Philadelphia as well as in Houston, Texas, where he was made an honorary citizen by the mayor.

In 1984, he published Metamorphoses, a book in which he presented nineteen of his collections by analyzing his philosophy on the nature and function of jewelry. The jewel, for Ilias Lalaounis, is not a simple decorative object, rather it carries a message, is an expression of inner life, a link with the distant past, a symbol and a memory. He received the Thorlet Award (Prix Thorlet) for the book from the Académie des Beaux-Arts. Subsequently, a retrospective exhibition of his creations was presented in the Sorbonne Chapel. For his contribution to the arts, Lalaounis was made Knight of the Order of Arts and Letters (Chevalier de l'ordre des Arts et Lettres) by the French government and Commander of the Order of Academic Palms (Commandeur des Palmes Académiques). He was also elected as a member of the Académie des Beaux-Arts of the Institut de France, the only jeweler ever to be inducted. The Academicians' swords (épées d'Académiciens), given to members on their induction, were originally designed by Salvador Dalí, and when Dalí became too frail to continue, he named his close friend Ilias Lalaounis to continue his work.

In November 1987, Lalaounis was invited by Teddy Kollek, Mayor of Jerusalem, to present his collection Treasures of the Holy Land, in an exhibition specially organized by the Israel Museum and subsequently shown in New York, London and Paris. The following year he presented Arabesques, a collection of gold and silver creations set with precious and semi-precious stones. The Minister of Foreign Affairs of Turkey invited him to exhibit Arabesques, as well as another complementary collection, Soleiman the Magnificent, at the Islamic Art Museum of Istanbul. He launched Ameridians in New York, a collection inspired by the art of North American Indians and in 1991, opened his store on Madison Avenue in New York, where he presented his collection inspired by Celtic art.

== Museum ==
In 1994, he founded the Ilias Lalaounis Jewelry Museum, located under the Acropolis, in the center of Athens. The permanent exhibition displays jewelry and micro-sculptures from forty-five collections, designed by Lalaounis in the period 1940–1992. Some special commissions are also kept on permanent display, such as the Olympic torch, designed by Ilias Lalaounis, used to start the Olympic torch rally before every Olympic Games.

== Personal life ==
He married Lila Altitzoglou in 1957. They had four daughters, Aikaterini, Demetra, Maria and Ioanna. Lalaounis died on December 30, 2013, in Athens, Greece. His daughters have taken over the administration of the firm.

He was a member of the Rotary Club of Athens.

== Honors and awards ==
- 1986: Corresponding member of the Académie des Beaux-Arts of the Institut de France
- 1986: Grand Archon of the Ecumenical Patriarchate of Constantinople
- 1988: Commander of the Order of Merit of the Italian Republic
- 1990: Associate member of the Académie des Beaux-Arts of the Institut de France
- 1995: Knight of the Order of the Legion of Honor
- 1999: Medal of the City of Athens
