= Cheick Sidi Diarra =

Malian diplomat

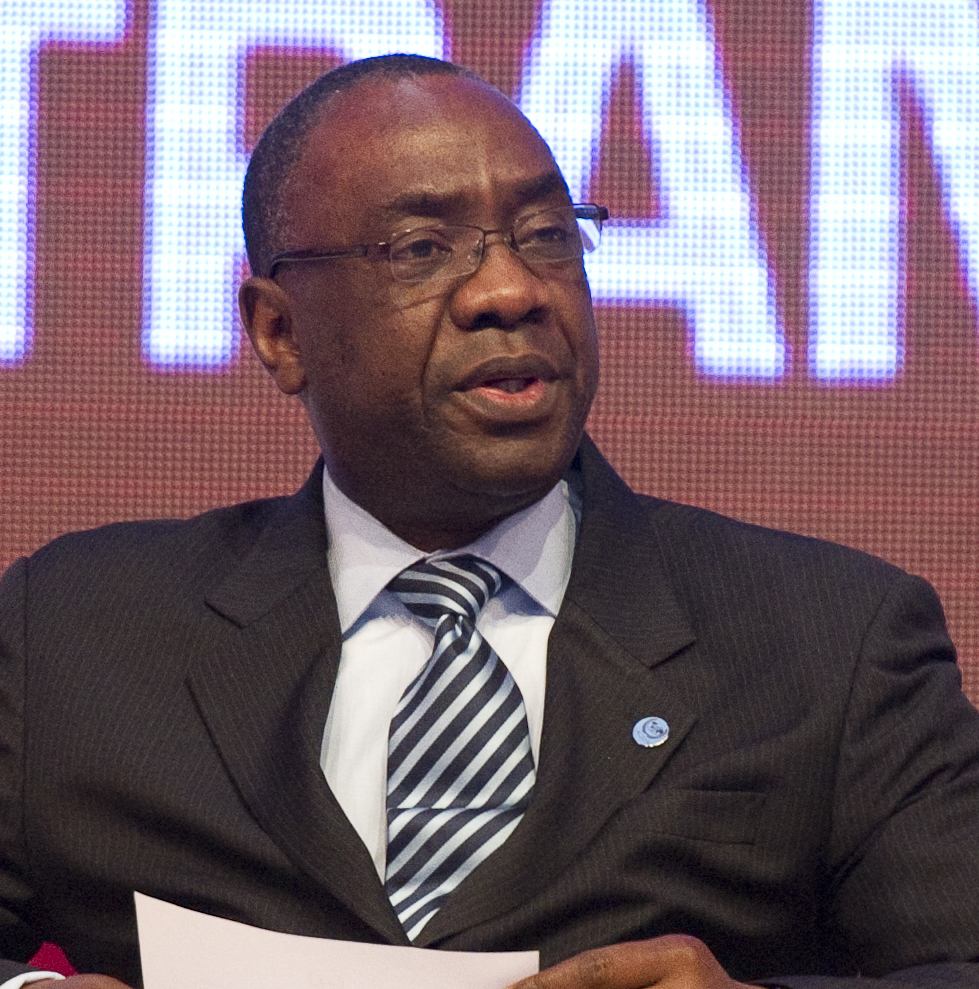
Cheick Sidi Diarra

Cheick Sidi Diarra (born 31 May 1957) is a Malian diplomat.

Diarra was born on 31 May 1957, in Kayes, Mali. He holds a master's degree in international public law and international relations from Dakar University in Senegal.

In 1982, he became a negotiator on African integration and development issues. He has played a role in United Nations economic and development matters, and was a contributor to the intergovernmental consultation process that led to the strengthening of the UN Economic and Social Council.

He has served as United Nations Special Adviser on Africa and was appointed High Representative for the Least Developed Countries, Landlocked Developing Countries and Small Island Developing States (OSAA/OHRLLS) by UN Secretary-General Ban Ki-moon in January 2008.
