= Euro-Mediterranean University of Slovenia =

Emuni University Emuni Univerza Université Emuni
- Established: 2008
- Headquarters: Koper, Slovenia
- Coordinates: 45°31′0.69″N 13°35′0.99″E
- Members: 216 universities and institutions
- Official language: English, French, Slovenian
- President: Prof. Dr. Rado Bohinc
- Website: emuni.si

EMUNI University was established on 9 June 2008 in Portorož, Slovenia, with the objective of becoming an international, post-graduate, higher-education and research institution, fully integrated in the Euro-Mediterranean Area. It was co-founded by four universities: University of Haifa (Israel), University of Maribor (Slovenia), University of Sousse (Tunisia) and University of Urbino "Carlo Bo" (Italy). In February 2009 EMUNI University became a legal entity in the Republic of Slovenia.

EMUNI University is one of the six priorities of the Union for the Mediterranean, whose secretariat was created by the Joint Declaration of the Paris Summit for the Mediterranean.

EMUNI University has several member institutions, including universities and other higher-education and research institutions from many countries.

The activities of EMUNI University include postgraduate education, seminars, (international) conferences, summer schools, professional courses, professional upgrading study programmes and other activities. At the end of 2008, the International Journal of Euro-Mediterranean Studies (IJEMS) started to be issued. In 2012, IJEMS was issued by the Springer Nature publishing company.

The activities of EMUNI University focus on the Union for the Mediterranean priority areas as well as maritime and land highways, alternative energies, culture and tourism, human rights and migration, civil protection, gender issues, water management, foreign policy, business development initiative and Euro-Mediterranean higher education and research area.
