= Ilias Lalaounis Jewelry Museum =

Coordinates: 37°58′8.9″N 23°43′36.12″E

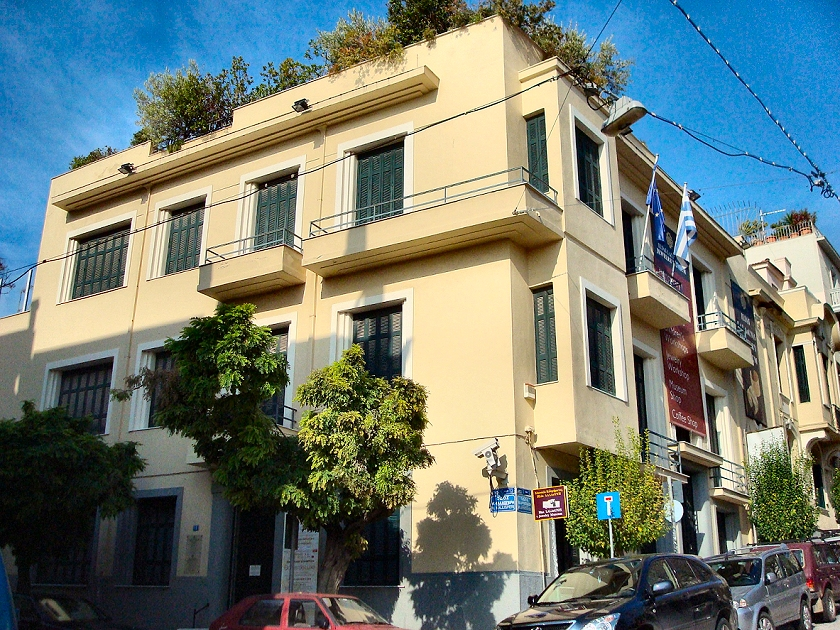
- Location: 12 Kallisperi Str., Athens, Greece
- Type: Jewelry museum
- Public transit access: Athens Metro stations: Akropolis
- Website: Official site

Ilias Lalaounis Jewelry Museum (often referred to as the ILJM) is a museum in Athens, Greece, created by the renowned Greek jewellery designer Ilias Lalaounis. The ILJM is located near the Acropolis, at the corner of Karyatidon and Kallisperi streets. It comprises 50 collections of a total of over 4,000 jewels and small ornaments dedicated to the history and art of jewellery making. The permanent exhibition displays more than 3000 pieces designed in the period 1940–1992.

== The buildings- Architecture- History ==
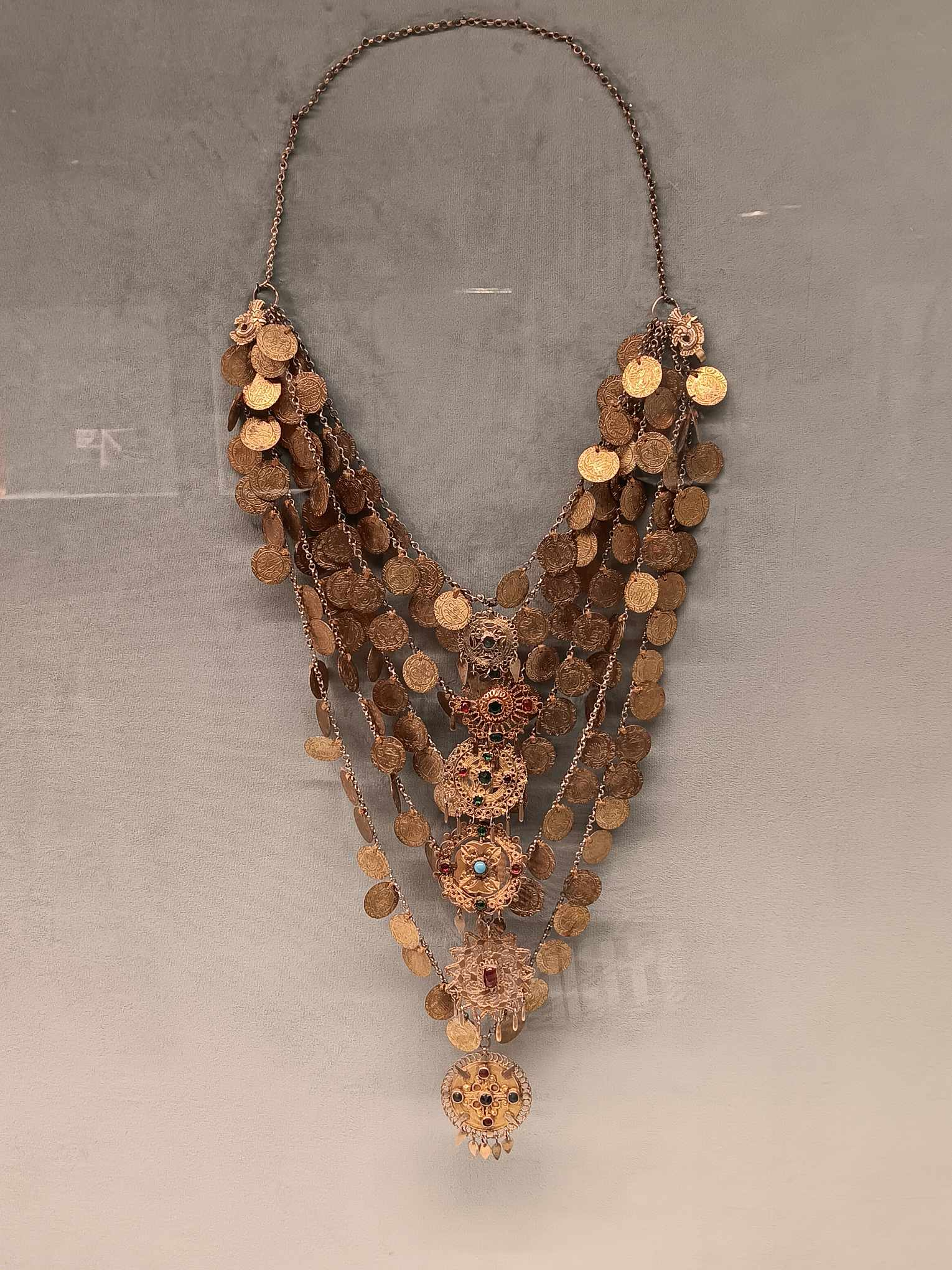
19th century Cordoni bridal jewellery from Attica

The Ilias Lalaounis Jewelry Museum is housed in two adjoining buildings which are connected internally: one located at 12 Kallisperi Street and the second facing Karyatidon Street.

The building at 12 Kallisperi Street dates to the 1930s Athenian modernist movement. From 1968 until the museum's founding, the workshops of Ilias Lalaounis Greek Gold, the first modern jewelry workshops in Greece, were located here. Today this building houses the museum exhibition spaces on two levels, a gift shop, a café and an auditorium/hall which can be used for a variety of functions. There is also a rooftop terrace. The museum was renovated in 2003-2004 based on the architectural plans of French architect, Bernard Zehrfuss (1908-1996), while the project was carried out by Greek architect, Vassilis Gregoriadis. The ILJM was the first museum in Greece designed to be accessible for visitors with disabilities.

The building facing Karyatidon Street is Art Deco and probably dates to the 1920s. Originally it was the home of the museum's founder and namesake, Ilias Lalaounis. Today it houses the museum's offices and extensive research library.

== Permanent exhibition ==
The permanent exhibition features over 3,000 jewelry items and micro-sculptures from 50 collections designed by Ilias Lalaounis between 1940 and 2002. Among others, collections include those inspired by prehistoric art, the art of Ancient Greece, the art and architecture of Byzantium, 15 different world cultures, nature and technology, as well as special commissions such as the Olympic torch and ceremonial swords.

== Education ==
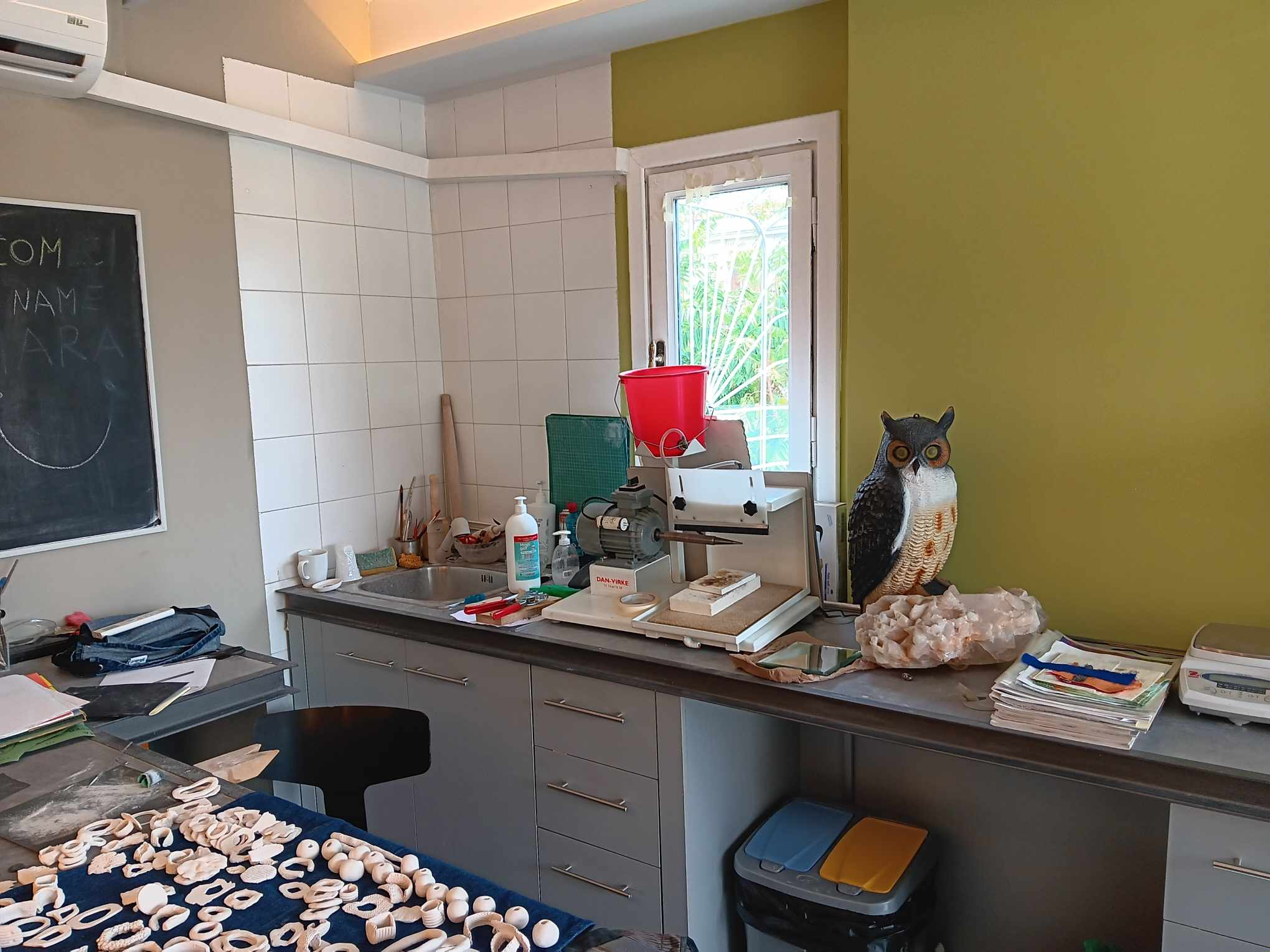
Jewelry artist in residence workshop

The ILJM's mission is foremost educational. The ILJM offers a multitude of educational programs for school children from pre-school through high school, adults, special interest and special needs groups. It organizes lectures, seminars and workshops on jewelry and the decorative arts. Internships for university students are available.

== Library ==
The ILJM research library contains more than 5000 volumes, including some rare ones. Its holdings are focused on jewelry, the history of art, folk art, design, photography, architecture and the decorative arts in general. It is open to the public by appointment.
