= Aleksandra McClain =

Archaeologist and university teacher

- Occupation: Archaeologist

Academic background
- Education: University of York (PhD)
- Thesis: Patronage, power and identity : the social use of local churches and commemorative monuments in tenth to twelfth-century North Yorkshire (2006)

Academic work
- Discipline: Medieval archaeology; church archaeology
- Institutions: University of York

Aleksandra McClain is an archaeologist who specialises in church archaeology and the study of the Middle Ages. She is editor of the journal Medieval Archaeology, and assistant editor of Church Archaeology. McClain joined the University of York, where she is a senior lecturer, in 2008; she completed her doctorate at the same university in 2005.

== Selected publications ==
- Hall, Richard; Kendall, Toby; Briden, Colin; Bailey, Richard; Hawkes, Jane; McClain, Aleksandra; Marks, Richard; Rogers, Nicola; Ottaway, Patrick James (2008). "St Helen's Church, Skipwith, North Yorkshire". The Archaeological Journal. 165 (1): 399–470. doi:10.1080/00665983.2008.11020750. Wikidata Q43271319.
- McClain, Aleksandra (2012). "Theory, Disciplinary Perspectives and the Archaeology of Later Medieval England". Medieval Archaeology. 56 (1): 131–170. doi:10.1179/0076609712z.0000000005. Wikidata Q44486459.
- Michael Fradley; Ashby, Steven Paul; McClain, Aleksandra (2014). "An earthwork survey at Torpel Manor Field (Cambridgeshire)" (PDF). Medieval Settlement Research. 29: 60–63. Wikidata Q47090662.
- McClain, Aleksandra (2017). "Rewriting the Narrative: Regional Dimensions of the Norman Conquest". The Archaeology of the 11th Century: Continuities and Transformations. Society for Medieval Archaeology Monograph Series: 203–227. doi:10.4324/9781315312934-11. ISBN 978-1-315-31293-4. Wikidata Q86997902.
- Gosling, Frieda; Ashby, Steven Paul; McClain, Aleksandra (2017), Torpel Manor: The Biography of a Landscape, Langdyke History and Archaeology Group, Wikidata Q100978456
- McClain, Aleksandra; Sykes, Naomi (2019). "New Archaeologies of the Norman Conquest". Anglo-Norman Studies. 41: 83–101. ISSN 0954-9927. Wikidata Q87444487.
