= Richard Hall =

Richard, Rich or Richie Hall may refer to:

== Sports ==
- Richard Hall (boxer) (born 1971), former World Boxing Association interim cruiserweight world champion
- Richard Hall (Australian cricketer)
- Richard Hall (English cricketer) (born 1978)
- Richard Hall (footballer) (born 1972), English former footballer
- Richie Hall (born 1960), American football player
- Richard Hall (speedway rider) (born 1984), English motorcycle speedway ride

== Music ==
- Richard Hall (born 1965), birth name of Moby, American DJ, musician, singer and songwriter
- Richard Hall (composer) (1903–1982), British classical composer
- Richard Hall (musician), Jamaican saxophonist
- Richard Hall (organist) (died 1773), English organist
- Rick Hall (1932–2018), American record producer, recording studio owner, music publisher and songwriter

== Politics ==
- Richard Hall (politician) (1855–1918), coal merchant and politician in British Columbia, Canada
- Richard Edward Hall (1907–1977), Canadian member of the Legislative Assembly of Alberta
- Richard Hope Hall (1924–2007), British-born merchant banker, businessman and politician in Rhodesia
- Richard Reese Hall, Canadian member of the Legislative Assembly of Ontario

== Other uses ==
- Richard Hall (archaeologist) (1949–2011), English archaeologist
- Richard Hall (painter) (1860–1942), Finnish-born painter
- Richard Hall (writer) (1926–1992), American writer
- Richard H. Hall (1930–2009), ufologist
- Richard Seymour Hall (1925–1997), British journalist and historian
- Rich Hall (born 1954), American comedian and writer
- Richard Hall (Miami University), a dormitory on the Central Quad of Miami University's Oxford, Ohio campus

== See also ==
- Dick Hall (disambiguation)
