= Swansea Magpies =

Football club

Swansea Magpies Football Club

Names
- Full name: Swansea Magpies Australian Rules Football Club
- Nickname(s): The Magpies

2010 season
- After finals: 2nd

Club details
- Founded: 2007
- Colours: Black and White
- Competition: Welsh Australian Rules Football League
- Ground(s): Swansea University

Other information
- Official website: Magpies homepage

The Swansea Magpies is an Australian rules football club based in Swansea, Wales. The club play in the Welsh Australian Rules Football League under the 9-a-side footy rules.

== History ==
The Swansea Magpies were one of the founding member teams of the W.A.R.F.L., playing their first season in 2008. Although in their first season the Magpies struggled to even field a team, they have grown into one of the strongest and most consistent teams in the W.A.R.F.L., competing in two successive grand finals in 2009 and 2010 against the South Cardiff Panthers.

With the 2012 season beginning soon the Swansea Magpies are actively recruiting new players for the new season.

== Past results ==
The Magpies struggled in their first year, finishing the season winless and in last position on the ladder. The following season, 2009, signaled a fresh start with a significantly expanded and inexperienced player base. Struggling initially, the Magpies recorded their first league win in their history in round four versus Cardiff Double Blues. They went on to reach the grand final against the South Cardiff Panthers. After the final whistle the scores were recorded as a draw. Controversially, the Panthers were found to have won by two points after a recount, having been awarded a behind that was clearly wide.
