= Death and Memory in Early Medieval Britain =

Book by Howard Williams

- The first edition cover of the book, depicting an illustration by Aaron Watson.
- Author: Howard Williams
- Language: English
- Subject: Anglo-Saxon archaeology
- Publisher: Cambridge University Press
- Publication date: 2006
- Publication place: United Kingdom
- Media type: Print (Hardcover, paperback)
- Pages: 254
- ISBN: 978-0-521-14225-0

Death and Memory in Early Medieval Britain is an archaeological study of mnemonic elements in the funerary practices of early medieval Britain, written by the British archaeologist Howard Williams. The book was first published by Cambridge University Press as part of their series "Cambridge Studies in Archaeology" in 2006.

== Synopsis ==
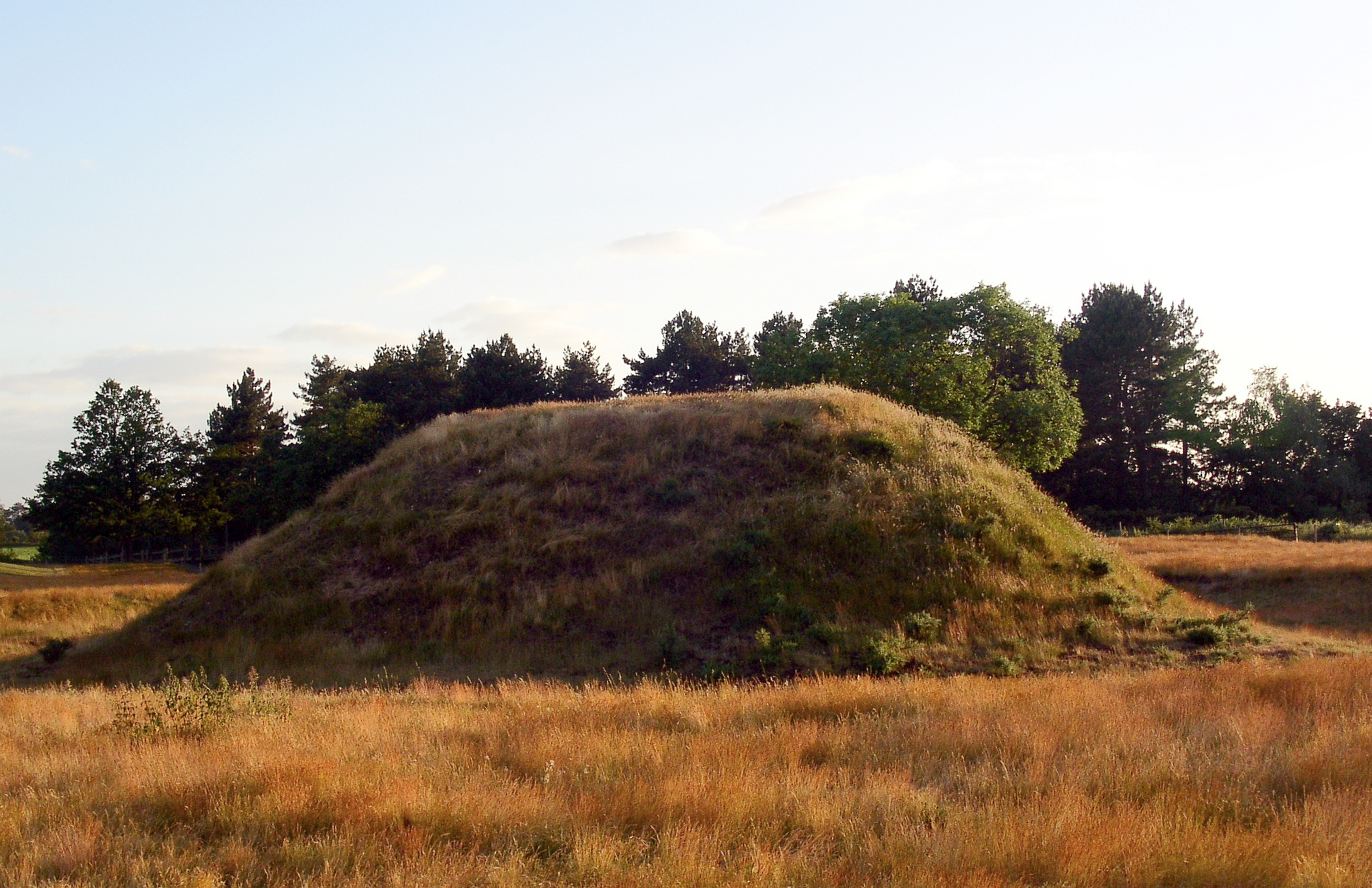
The Mound 2 burial tumuli at Sutton Hoo, Suffolk. Williams discusses the mnemonic effect that monuments such as these would have had on the population.

The first chapter, "Death, Memory and Material Culture", serves as an introduction to Williams' approach. Stating that "mortuary practices can be conceptualized as strategies for remembering and forgetting", he discusses the influence of sociology and anthropology on his study before exploring the Anglo-Saxon cemetery at Swallowcliffe Down in Wiltshire. Chapter two, "Objects of memory", examines the inclusion of grave goods in Early Medieval burials, among them jewellery and weaponry, emphasising the mnemonic effects that these might have had on those attending the funeral. In "Remembering through the body", Williams examines mnemonic elements to the manner in which the corpse was prepared before cremation or inhumation, resulting in its burial.

Chapter four, "Graves as mnemonic compositions", argues that Early Medieval graves were "mnemonic performances aimed at constructing the present in relation to the past and future." Looking at the sequence of scenes that onlookers would have witnessed, it discusses graves and grave structures, before using Snape, Sutton Hoo, and the northern cist burials, as case studies.

The fifth chapter, "Monuments and memory", focuses on the way in which cairns and burial mounds were erected to commemorate the death, also looking at ring ditches and Pictish symbol stones. "Death and landscape" takes a wider view of the relation between Early Medieval burials and the wider landscape, discussing the reuse of prehistoric monuments, and the relation between burials and routeways, settlements, and significant natural places. Highlighting that not all Early Medieval burials are in cemeteries, Williams looks to literary evidence from land charters and Beowulf to theorise mortuary landscapes.

== Reception ==
=== Academic reviews ===
Leslie Webster of the British Museum reviewed the tome for the peer-reviewed journal Antiquity. Describing it as an "excellent book", she welcomed it as the "first extended study" into how the dead were remembered in Early Medieval British society. Although noting that churches, domestic architecture, and stone monuments were not discussed, she believed that Williams used sufficient evidence to illustrate his "firm command" of the subject. Praising the presentation of the evidence and the "particularly elegant" illustrations, she believed that he would have benefitted from including information on the Prittlewell Prince burial, Franks Casket, and a wider array of contemporary literary sources. More critically, she noted the existence of several typos in the text, believing that it could have benefited from a "firmer editorial hand", and believed that its "textbook style" made the work difficult to read at points.

In the Time and Mind journal, George Nash reviewed Williams' book.
