= Swallowcliffe =

Village in Wiltshire, England

Coordinates: 51.043°N 2.052°W

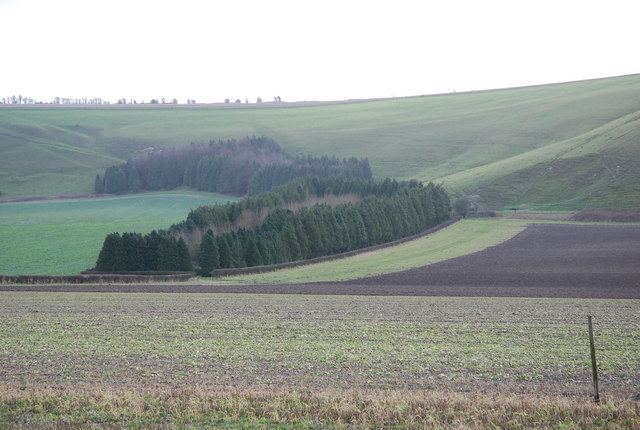
- Farmland, Swallowcliffe

- Location within Wiltshire
- Population: 174 (in 2011)
- OS grid reference: ST965271
- Civil parish: Swallowcliffe
- Unitary authority: Wiltshire
- Ceremonial county: Wiltshire
- Region: South West
- Country: England
- Sovereign state: United Kingdom
- Post town: Salisbury
- Postcode district: SP3
- Dialling code: 01747
- Police: Wiltshire
- Fire: Dorset and Wiltshire
- Ambulance: South Western
- UK Parliament: Salisbury
- Website: www.swallowcliffevillage.uk

Swallowcliffe is a small village and civil parish in Wiltshire, England, about 2 miles (3.2 km) southeast of Tisbury and 11 miles (18 km) west of Salisbury. The village lies about half a mile north of the A30 Shaftesbury-Wilton road which crosses the parish.

== Geography ==
Swallowcliffe lies on the southern edge of the Vale of Wardour. The parish is composed of chalk escarpments and greensand terraces to the south and upper greensand wooded hills to the south-west; also to the northeast, where Swallowcliffe Wood is prominent. Cutting through the hills south to north is the spring-filled valley where the village first developed. In the south, Swallowcliffe Down rises to a height of 221 metres at a spur of White Sheet Hill, and the parish boundary is an ancient ridgeway.

== History ==
There is a Neolithic long barrow, 95m in length, in the southwest of the parish on Swallowcliffe Down, where the boundaries of Swallowcliffe, Ansty, and Alvediston parishes now meet. The Iron Age hillfort known as Castle Ditches lies just over the northern boundary of the parish.

The boundaries of the parish are little changed from those described in 940. Three estates, one of them held by Wilton Abbey, were recorded in Domesday Book of 1086 at Sualoclive, with just seven households altogether.

From medieval times to the 20th century, Swallowcliffe was a rural backwater, its inhabitants engaged in agriculture and associated crafts and trades. Much of the open field system, possibly Saxon, survived until the enclosures of the late 18th century. From 1742, with the new Earl of Pembroke as the owner of Swallowclift manor, the estate maps show the developing settlement pattern with the Norman church at the hub.

The ridgeway on Swallowcliffe Down was part of a London to Exeter road in the 17th century, which in the later 18th was superseded by the lower route which is now the A30.

The house called Swallowcliffe Manor dates from the mid-17th century and was extended in the early 20th.

The 19th century was a period of reform and renewal. In 1843 a new church was built away from the spring-soaked valley and soon afterwards, the tannery by the stream was closed and the house became the Royal Oak public house. With Pembroke patronage, a new vicarage and a school were built to the west of the old village heralding. The sale of the Swallowcliffe Pembroke Estate in 1918, mainly to tenants, marked the end of an era of aristocratic landlords in the locality. The population of Swallowcliffe had reached a peak of 371 in 1871, before falling in consequence of agricultural depression and changes in farming methods.

The modern development of Swallowcliffe stemmed from the rapid social change of the 20th century, accelerated by improvements in transport and two world wars. Mechanisation played its part in the exodus from agricultural employment. Already by c.1908, a new principal farmhouse had been built on the outskirts of Swallowcliffe and the Manor Farmhouse, like the Mill, (c.1900) shifted to private ownership and use. This set the trend within the village for the rest of the century, with small farmsteads, labourer's cottages, wheelwright and blacksmith shop, village general store, post office, schoolhouse and barns to follow. The exodus from the land continued, while the demand by incomers for the accessible country abode, to "improve" for full or weekend use, expanded. Social change is mirrored in this change of ownership. By the Millennium, the transformation of the old village was clear, with only a few of its inhabitants "born and bred" in Swallowcliffe or working in its ancient tradition of agriculture.

== Archaeology ==
An Anglo-Saxon bed burial dating to the seventh century AD was discovered within a reused Bronze Age barrow on Swallowcliffe Down in 1966. The burial was that of a young female aged between 18 and 25, laid on an ash-wood bed with elaborate iron-work fittings, and surrounded by a collection of grave-goods of high quality. A report of the 1966 work was published by English Heritage in 1989, and the monument is a topic in Howard Williams' Death and Memory in Early Medieval Britain (2006).

== Parish church ==
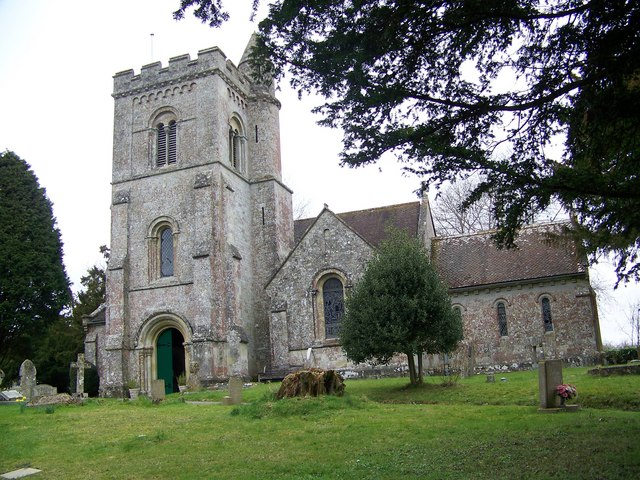
St Peter's Church

A church at Swallowcliffe is mentioned in the early 12th century, and by 1160 income from it endowed a canon at the collegiate church of St Paul, Heytesbury. From 1220 until Heytesbury's collegiate status was removed in 1840, Heytesbury and therefore Swallofcliffe were controlled by the Dean of Salisbury. There was no vicar, instead prebendaries usually appointed a curate; the living became a vicarage in 1868.

The ancient church, dedicated to St Peter, stood near a stream and was subject to flooding. A new church was built on higher ground in 1842–43 in neo-Norman style to designs of George Gilbert Scott and William Moffatt, possibly reusing parts of the first church. It is built in limestone ashlar with tile roofs, and has a nave, aisles, a south transept, a chancel, and a three-stage south tower incorporating a porch. The tower has angle buttresses and string courses, and at the top is a Lombard frieze, a corbel table, and an embattled parapet; in its east angle is a stair turret with a square base, becoming cylindrical, and with a conical roof. The church was recorded as Grade II* listed in 1966.

The three bells from the earlier church were installed to be rung from the porch but are said to be unringable at present. The tenor dated 1632 survives but the others were replaced or recast in the 19th century. A recess in the porch houses a recumbent stone effigy of Sir Thomas West (d.1343) which was brought from the earlier church. There are two stone fonts, said to also have been brought from there.

In 1924 the benefice was united with that of Ansty, although the parishes remained separate; in 1975 Tisbury benefice was added, and all three parishes combined. Chilmark benefice joined them in 1976 and a team ministry was established, today known as the Nadder Valley benefice and covering fourteen parishes with sixteen churches.

== Amenities ==
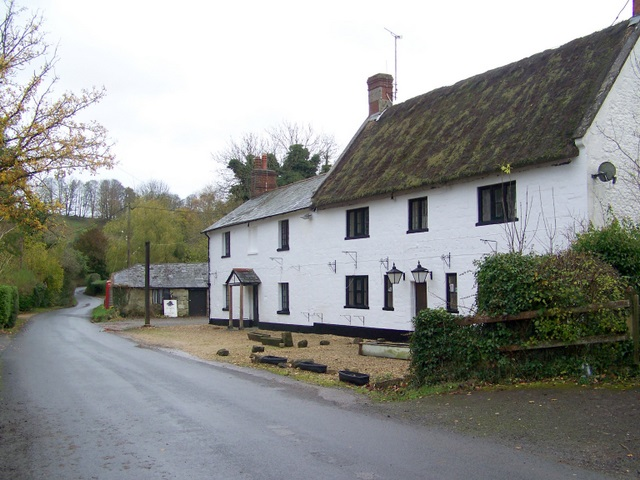
The Royal Oak pub in 2009, during its period of closure

The Royal Oak pub closed in 2007 and reopened in 2015 after it was bought by a consortium of villagers. Television presenter James May, who lives in the area, became a part-owner of The Royal Oak in 2020. The building is from the early 18th century and is Grade II listed.

The village has no school. A National School was opened in 1843 and closed in 1973.

== Notable residents ==
- Arthur Vincent Aston (1896–1981), colonial administrator, lived at Swallowcliffe in later life
- James Leasor (1923–2007), author, lived at Swallowcliffe
