= Martin Rundkvist =

Swedish archaeologist (born 1972)

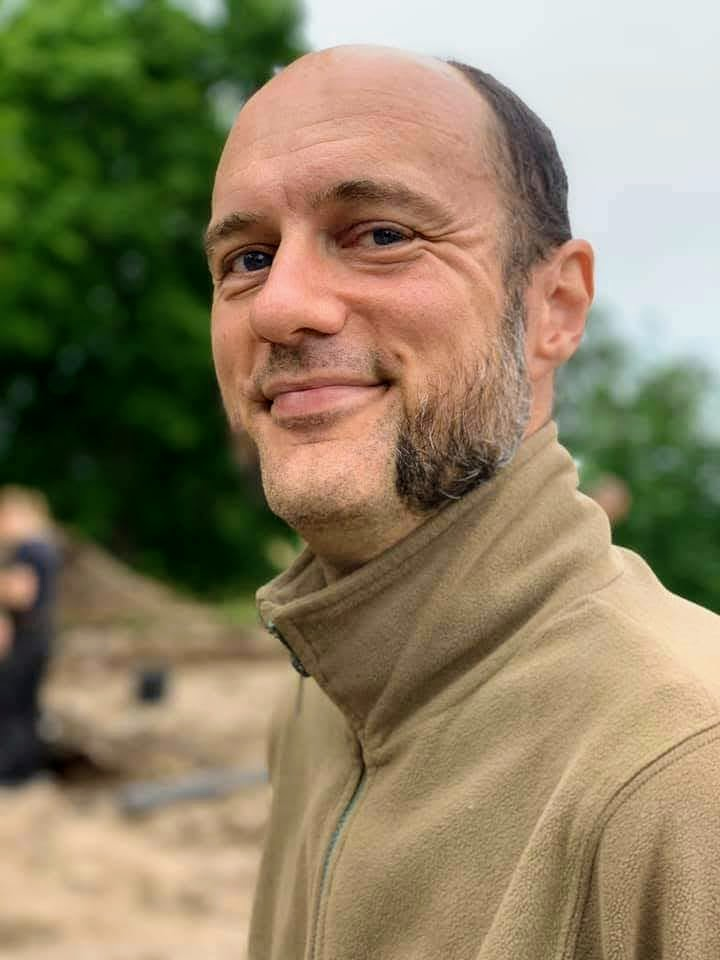
- Rundkvist on a dig in Aska, 2020
- Born: 4 April 1972 (age 54); Stockholm, Sweden
- Education: Stockholm University (BA, PhD)
- Occupation: Archaeologist

Martin Rundkvist (born 4 April 1972) is a Swedish archaeologist, translator, and associate professor at the University of Łódź in Poland. His research focuses on the Bronze, Iron, and Middle Ages of Scandinavia, including significant excavations in the province of Östergötland.

Rundkvist has studied and excavated various sites in Sweden, particularly in the country's south. In 2003 and 2004, he published a three-volume work which doubled as his PhD dissertation, cataloguing the finds from Barshalder, the largest prehistoric cemetery on the Swedish island of Gotland. A subsequent book identified nine possible regional power centres in Östergötland, and attempted to determine where the "Beowulfian mead halls" of the day once stood. (Note: Rundkvist 2011, p. 9 (hyphen omitted).) Excavating years later at one of these sites, Aska, Rundkvist uncovered the foundations of a large mead hall, and 30 ornate gold figures that might have represented gods or royals. In other works, Rundkvist has excavated a Viking boat grave, and analysed both the placement of deposited artefacts in the landscape and the lifestyles of the Scandinavian élite during the Middle Ages.

Rundkvist has worked in archaeology since 1992, including research and lecture posts at the universities of Exeter, Chester, Linnaeus, and Tallinn. He spent two decades as managing editor of Fornvännen, a journal on archaeology and medieval art, and authors the blog Aardvarchaeology, which the James Randi Educational Foundation termed "the most-read archaeology blog on the Internet". Rundkvist served as chair for the Swedish Skeptics' Association for four years, and edited its quarterly magazine Folkvett.

== Early life and education ==
Martin Rundkvist was born on 4 April 1972 in Stockholm, Sweden, to Åsa Leander and Pelle Rundkvist. Other than living in Connecticut from 1976 to 1978 while his father worked in advertising at Young & Rubicam in New York, Rundkvist has spent his entire life in Stockholm. As a teenager in the 1980s, he played role-playing games and spent time on online bulletin board systems. Rundkvist graduated with a Bachelor of Arts from Stockholm University in 1992, and received his PhD from the same institution in 2003. In 2001, Rundkvist won several games on the Swedish version of the television show Jeopardy!. That same year, he gave a public talk on J. R. R. Tolkien's Middle-earth and its connection to archaeology.

== Career ==
Rundkvist has held archaeological positions since 1992; these were primarily research-related, but included contract work. Among these were positions as an honorary researcher at the University of Exeter from 2005 to 2008, as a project leader, field archaeologist, and artefact specialist for Värmdö Municipality from 2007 to 2008, and as a visiting researcher at the University of Chester from 2008 to 2015. Howard Williams, an archaeologist at Chester, said that Rundkvist's appointment "augments our international research expertise in early medieval archaeology, and we foresee a range of advantages for collaborative research and fieldwork opportunities for students in Viking Age archaeology". Rundkvist was a senior lecturer at Linnaeus University starting in 2012, and at Umeå University starting in autumn 2013. In 2014 he began working as a collaborator at Tallinn University's Institute of History. He joined the faculty at the University of Łódź's Institute of Archaeology in January 2020, and as of 2021 is an associate professor there.

Rundkvist has held a variety of positions with academic journals. From April 1999 to November 2018, he was the managing editor of the quarterly Fornvännen—the Journal of Swedish Antiquarian Research—published by the Royal Swedish Academy of Letters, History and Antiquities. Rundkvist wrote that he joined partly to gain "a better platform in academic archaeology than the shaky one I had as a PhD student", and stayed in part because "the Royal Academy of Letters is a very good employer and takes care of its people".

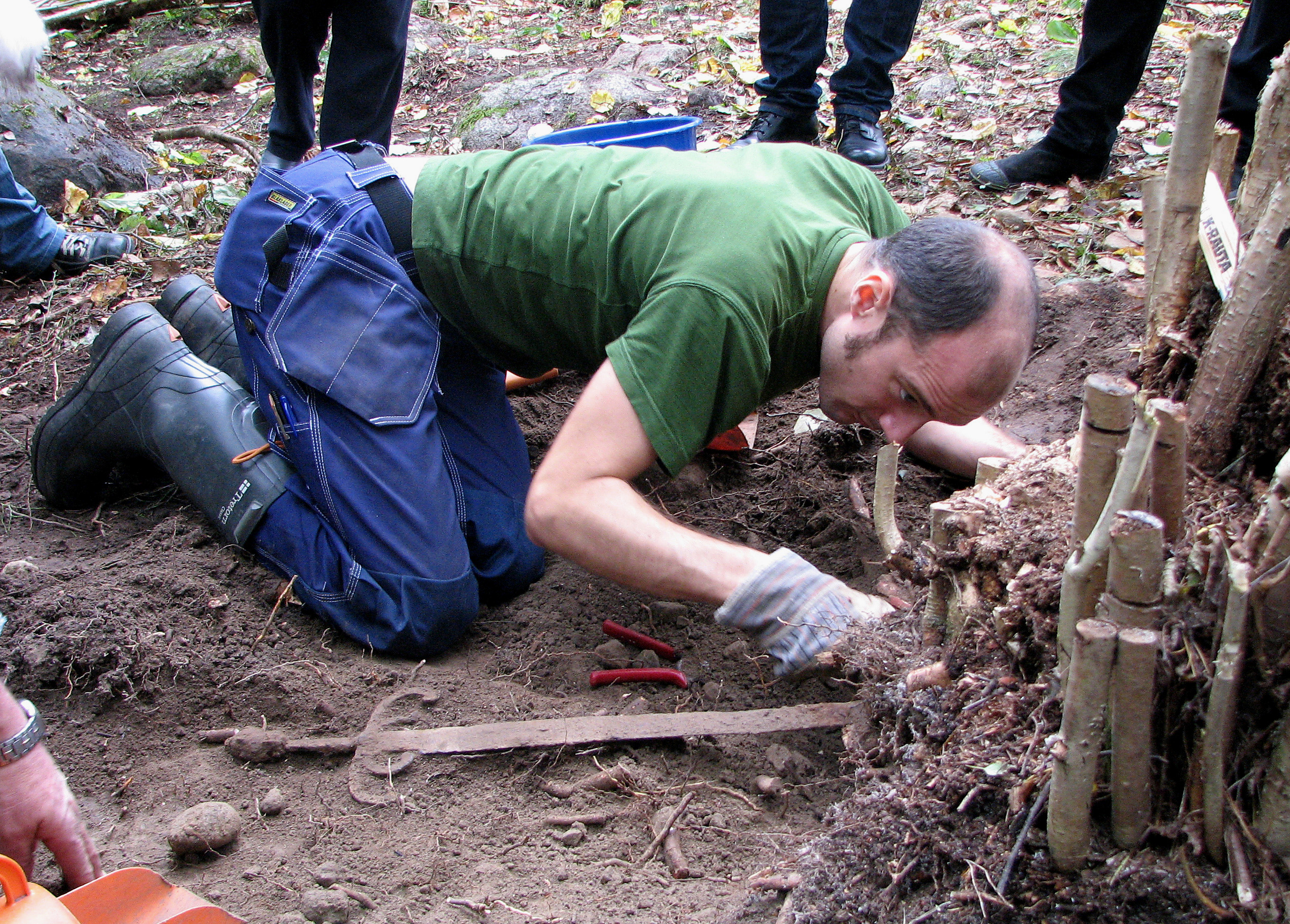
Rundkvist excavating a 16th-century sword in Djurhamn, in 2007

From 2006 to 2012, Rundkvist served as the Scandinavian correspondent for Antiquity. He also served as a referee for the journal, and for the International Journal of Osteoarchaeology, In Situ Archaeologica, Norwegian Archaeological Review, and the Estonian Journal of Archaeology. He has kept an influential blog since at least 2006, first titled "Salto Sobrius", and now known as Aardvarchaeology; it has been termed by the James Randi Educational Foundation as "the most-read archaeology blog on the Internet", and by Archaeology as a "quirky and popular Swedish blog" with "an opinionated perspective on scientific archaeology with a particular focus on Scandinavia". Rundkvist has announced several finds on the blog, such as a 16th-century sword found in Djurhamn, and a Viking crucifix estimated to be Denmark's oldest. Rundkvist is also a member of the Internationales Sachsensymposion, an international society formed to study Germanic Saxons and the relationships between these populations and those in countries bordering the North and Baltic Seas.

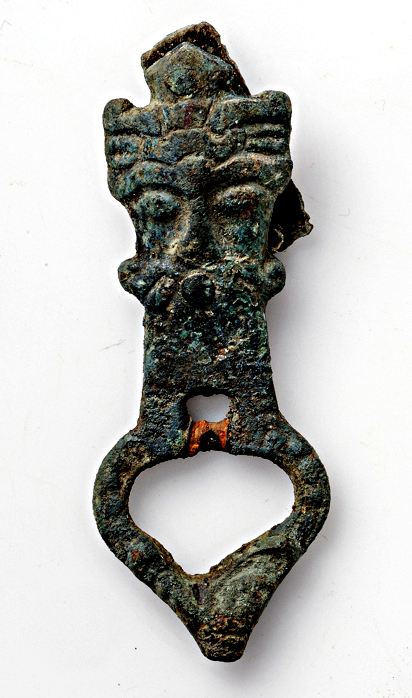
Bronze buckle from Barshalder, the subject of Rundkvist's dissertation (Note: Rundkvist 2003a, p. 188)

Rundkvist has frequently featured in the news media. In 2011, Sweden's national newspaper Dagens Nyheter and other outlets repeatedly covered a controversy between Rundkvist and the amateur archaeologist Bob Lind about excavations at the Ale's Stones stone ship, with Rundkvist noting that Lind's theories of the Stones' date and use were at odds with the scientific consensus. Speaking to Live Science, Rundkvist said that the stones were likely a grave marker from "the world of Beowulf". Rundkvist participated in Curators of Sweden in 2016, handling the country's official Twitter account, @Sweden, for what he termed a "geeky, pun-ridden and bookish" week. The following year, he appeared in a debate in Svenska Dagbladet about the low level of thematically relevant training among Sweden's museum directors. Rundkvist had attracted attention as far back as 2002 for criticising Swedish History Museum director Kristian Berg, whom he called "a non-archaeologist whose attitude to the museum placed in his care may be summarised as politically expedient, instrumental and post-modernist".

=== Research ===
Rundkvist's research focuses on the Bronze through Middle Ages in Scandinavia. His PhD dissertation—Barshalder 1. A Cemetery in Grötlingbo and Fide Parishes, Gotland, Sweden, c. AD 1–1100—was published in book form in 2003, and catalogued the finds from Barshalder, a Late Iron Age cemetery on the island of Gotland. A companion volume, Barshalder 2, included essays placing the site in its wider context, and the following year Barshalder 3 detailed the Stone Age finds from the site. The topic was suggested by Jan Peder Lamm, who discovered important unpublished finds from the cemetery while organising the Swedish History Museum's stores, and declared that it would take "a foolish and stubborn person" to gather and publish the artefacts and notes from nearly two centuries of excavation. The works were reviewed in Antiquity as "a good thorough contextual study", and noted for offering "an elegant explanation" for clustered Viking Age graves, which Rundkvist argued represented grandparents and their grandchildren rather than a nuclear family.

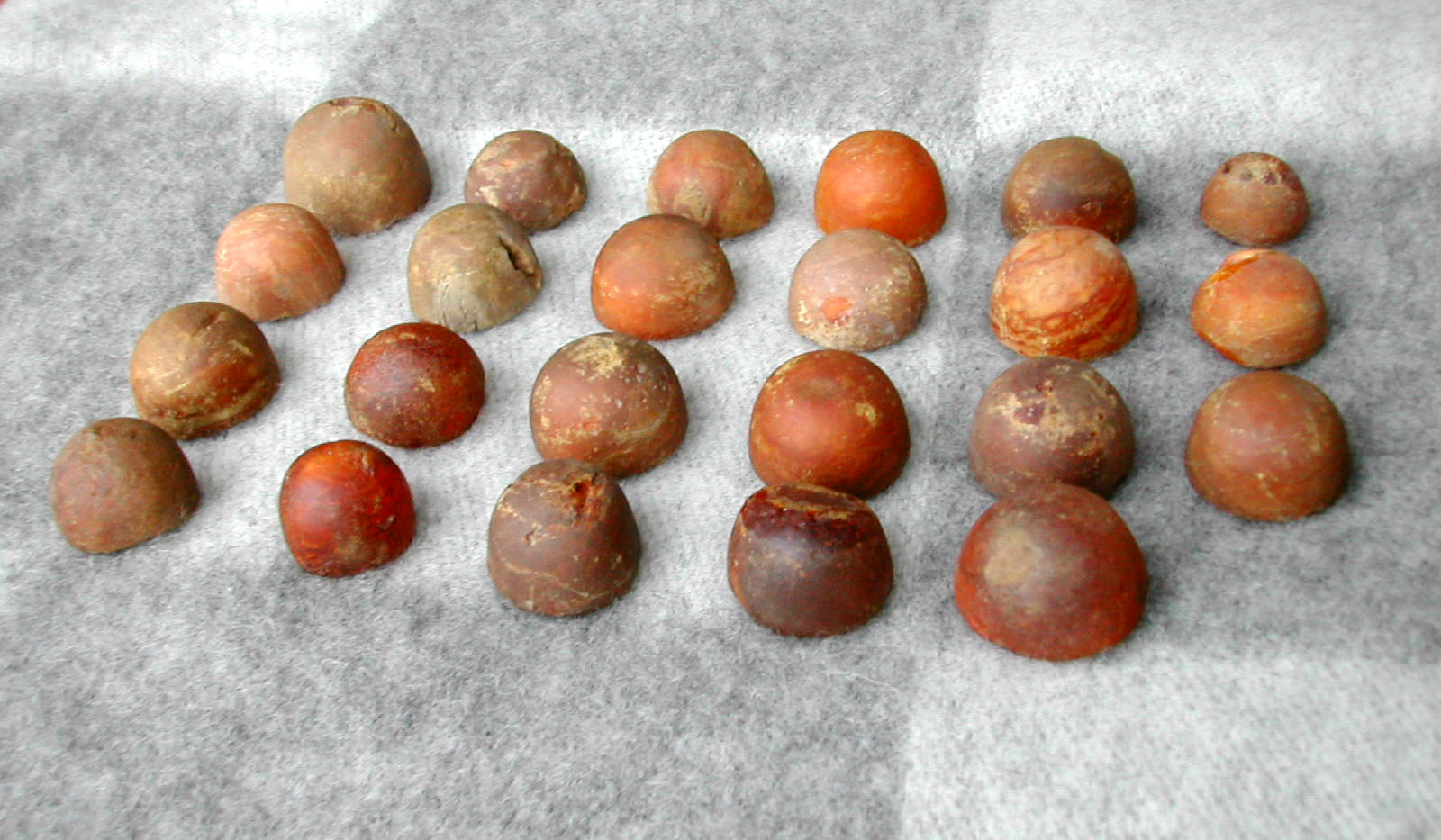
Amber gaming pieces from a boat grave in Skamby i Kuddby, near Norrköping

In 2005, Rundkvist and Williams directed the excavation of a Viking boat grave at Skamby, in the province of Östergötland. The site's surface features suggested a cemetery comprising ten boat graves, making it exceptional for the area. The excavation was the first of a boat burial in Östergötland. Widely reported in the media, the dig uncovered 23 rare amber gaming pieces, the first time such pieces had been found in the country since the excavation of a grave at Birka more than a century before. The finds, which Williams termed "once-in-a-lifetime discoveries for Martin and myself", were placed on permanent display in the Östergötlands museum in Linköping. Rundkvist and Williams published a paper on the finds in 2008. Two years later, Rundkvist published a widely cited paper on Scandinavian domed oblong brooches from the Vendel Period. The article catalogued nearly 600 such brooches, as well as transitional types through to the Early Viking Age, and was termed "comprehensive" by the Danish archaeologist Søren M. Sindbæk. The work was also praised by the Swedish archaeologist Birgitta Hårdh for demonstrating, among other things, how Uppåkra functioned as an innovation centre for new types of fibulae.

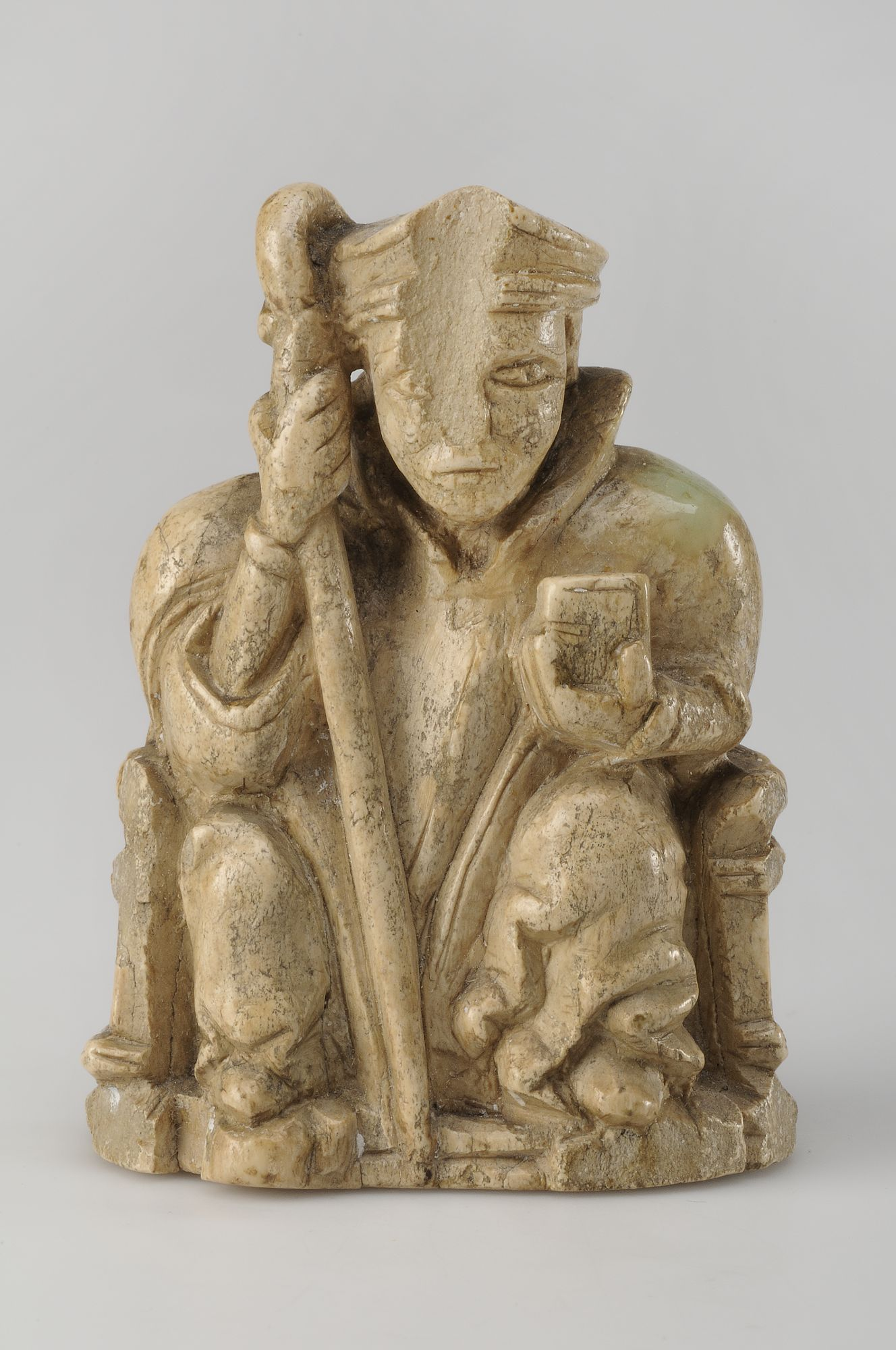
13th-century walrus ivory chess bishop found at Stegeborg Castle

In 2011, Rundkvist published a fourth book, Mead-halls of the Eastern Geats. It analysed the regional political geography of Östergötland, and attempted to identify the region's "Beowulfian mead halls", the large buildings that housed the Late Iron Age élite. Interviewed by Ancient History Encyclopedia, Rundkvist said he chose to focus on Östergötland "mainly because little had been done about 1st millennium CE elite culture there". Rundkvist ultimately identified nine areas as regional power centres, where mead halls may have stood, during parts of the Late Roman Period through Viking Age.

Rundkvist's fifth book, In the Landscape and Between Worlds: Bronze Age Deposition Sites Around Lakes Mälaren and Hjälmaren in Sweden, was published in 2015. It analysed sites around lakes Mälaren and Hjälmaren where Bronze Age metalwork and stone implements had been found outside of burial and settlement contexts, and sought to identify traits that could be used to find new deposition sites. Given the region's comparatively humble finds, and the diffuse nature of Rundkvist's landscape descriptions—such as to look for where water "does something interesting"—several reviewers wrote that it would be difficult to translate his heuristic principles to the field, as intended; one termed it a "curate's egg". Nonetheless, reviewers (including Svend Hansen for Archäologische Informationen, and another for the European Journal of Archaeology), noted that the book was part of an emerging school of thought attempting to place deposited objects in the context of their landscape, and nearby sites. Writing in Landscapes, Mike Parker Pearson called it "a joy to read and a valuable regional synthesis for understanding the landscape context of votive deposition in the European Bronze Age".

Rundkvist's 2019 book At Home at the Castle, and its 2020 Swedish translation Hemma på borgen, were published by the Östergötland County Administrative Board. It built on Rundkvist's two decades of fieldwork in the area, including excavations of four of its twenty-five castles, and marked his entry into "the historically documented part of our province's past". Accordingly, one reviewer wrote that it "fluently combines archaeological evidence and historical textual sources". The work analysed the lifestyles of those who lived in castles in Östergötland around 1200–1530 AD; modifying a common saying about World War I, Rundkvist termed such existence "decades of boredom punctuated by weeks of terror". Several reviewers suggested the book worked better for a non-technical than an academic audience, though one termed it a "work of synthesis" that "puts into international reach some recent archaeological work on castles" in Östergötland. Another wrote that the book was full of "small but enlightening chapters" and that it "conducts researchers and other readers to an archaeological trip through the Swedish castles alongside the margins of the Baltic Sea".

In 2021, Rundkvist published a seventh book, an annotated English translation of the writings of the Swedish explorer Nils Matsson Kiöping. The son of a priest and possibly the illegitimate grandson of the Queen's brother Karl Gustavsson Stenbock, Kiöping had written about his travels from 1648 to 1656 along the coasts of Africa, Arabia and southern Asia, and an autobiographical essay first published posthumously in 1773. In 2025, Rundkvist published two further translations into Swedish: a collection of more than 30 of Lord Dunsany's short stories, including Idle Days on the Yann, and a collection of E. Nesbit's ghost stories for adults.

=== Aska mead hall ===
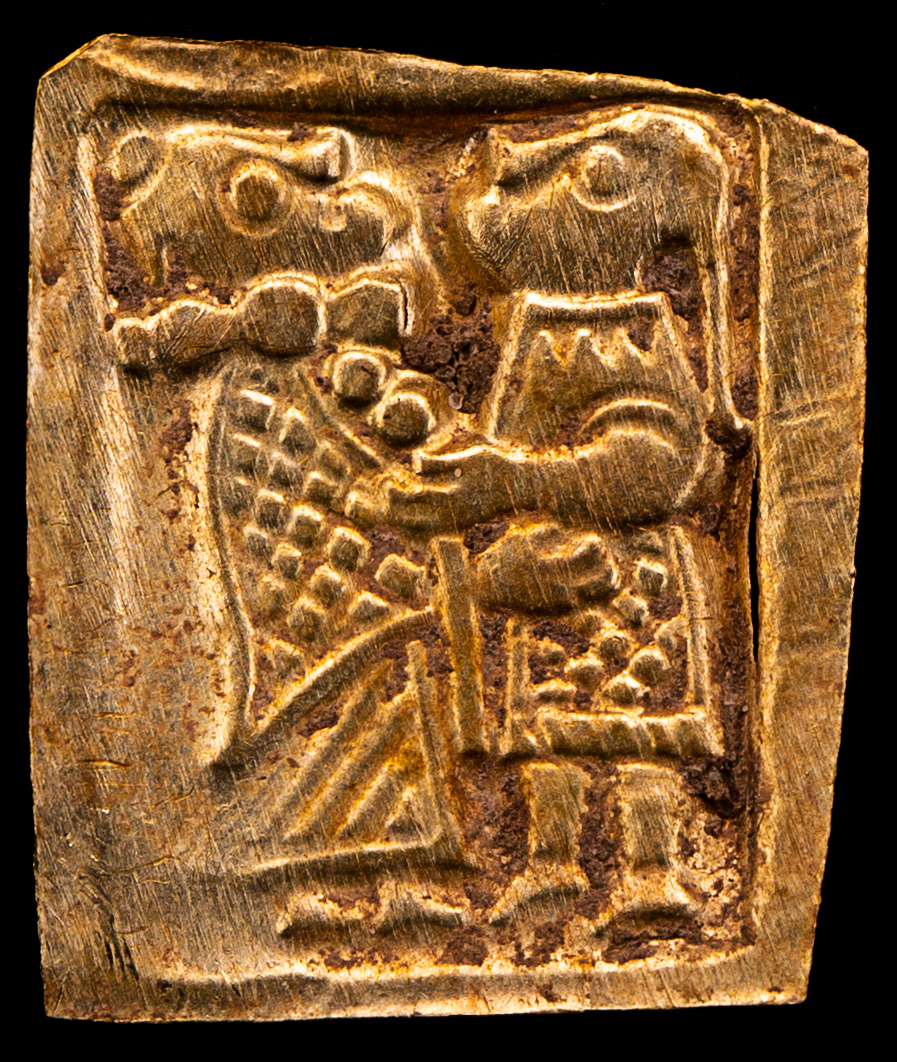
One of 30 gold foil figures found during excavations at Aska in 2020

Rundkvist began investigating the area around Aska, a large hamlet near the town of Vadstena, in 2006. Known primarily for a rich 10th-century burial excavated in 1920 by Ture J:son Arne, Aska also has a large and oddly shaped mound, which Rundkvist described as "oval and flat-topped, like a raised tennis court". (Note: Rundkvist & Viberg 2015, pp. 131–132) In his 2011 work on mead halls, he had termed Aska one of "the best candidates for elite settlements". In April 2013, Rundkvist and his colleague Andreas Viberg surveyed the mound with ground-penetrating radar, discovering evidence of a mead hall measuring 47.5 metres (156 feet) long and up to 14 m (46 ft) wide. (Note: Rundkvist & Viberg 2015, pp. 133–134) The mound, they determined, was a platform for the hall. (Note: Rundkvist & Viberg 2015, p. 136) Quoted in Archaeology, Rundkvist compared the hall to other contemporaneous élite sites in Fornsigtuna and Lejre, and particularly Gamla Uppsala.

In the summers of 2020 and 2021, Rundkvist returned to Aska to excavate the platform which, other than trial trenches dug in 1985 and 1986, remained unexcavated. (Note: Rundkvist & Viberg 2015, pp. 131–133) The dig uncovered part of the foundations of the mead hall from around 700 AD, including post holes, and artefacts such as two whale-bone gaming pieces, an iron pendant, flint flakes used to make fires, and a decorative Vendel Period shield mount. The excavations also uncovered around 30 stamped gold foil figures, or guldgubbar. Speaking to Sveriges Television, Rundkvist described it as only the third find of such figures in Östergötland, and said they may have represented the gods or royals; they may originally have been attached to support posts or high seats.

In September 2020, several weeks after the initial excavation of the mead hall, Rundkvist led a metal-detector survey of the West Cemeteries at Aska, where the rich burial had been found 100 years earlier, and the East Cemetery, discovered near the platform mound in 2006. Their survey reported finds to the west, suggesting the presence of both a settlement site and burials, including five brooches from the Early Vendel Period and fragmented copper-alloy jewellery from the Middle Viking Age. To the east, the survey reported further finds from the Vendel and Viking periods, along with an undisturbed inhumation, which they left for future excavation.

=== Swedish Skeptics' Association ===
Rundkvist has been active in the skeptical movement, having chaired the Swedish Skeptics' Association and edited its quarterly Folkvett. He joined the organisation in 1997, and immediately began writing for its journal. In 2002, he became an editor of the journal, and two years later he joined the association's executive board. From 2011 to 2014, he served as its chair, appearing in the press as a skeptic of perceived pseudoscience.

== Awards and distinctions ==
In 2020, the Royal Swedish Academy of Letters, History and Antiquities awarded Rundkvist their Antiquary Award in Silver "for many years of service and valuable editorship for the Academy journal Fornvännen".

The Riksantikvarieämbetet, the Swedish National Heritage Board, has created an archive of all Rundkvist's research reports, "Martin Rundkvists arkiv".

== Selected publications ==
=== Books ===
- Rundkvist, Martin (2003a). Barshalder 1. A Cemetery in Grötlingbo and Fide Parishes, Gotland, Sweden, c. AD 1–1100: Excavations and Finds 1826–1971 (PhD). Stockholm Archaeological Reports. Vol. 40. Stockholm: Stockholm University. ISBN 91-631-3530-2.
- ——— (2003b). Barshalder 2. Studies of Late Iron Age Gotland. Stockholm: Stockholm University. ISBN 91-631-3732-1.
- ——— Lindqvist, Christian & Thorsberg, Karl (2004). Barshalder 3. Rojrhage in Grötlingbo: A Multi-Component Neolithic Shore Site on Gotland. Stockholm Archaeological Reports. Vol. 41. Stockholm: Stockholm University. ISBN 91-631-4947-8.
- ——— (2011). Mead-halls of the Eastern Geats: Elite Settlements and Political Geography AD 375-1000 in Östergötland, Sweden. Handlingar, Antikvariska serien. Vol. 49. Stockholm: Royal Swedish Academy of Letters, History and Antiquities. ISBN 978-91-7402-405-0.
- ——— (2015). In the Landscape and Between Worlds: Bronze Age Deposition Sites Around Lakes Mälaren and Hjälmaren in Sweden. Archaeology and Environment. Vol. 29. Umeå: Department of Historical, Philosophical and Religious Studies, Umeå University. ISBN 978-91-7601-213-0. ISSN 0281-5877.
- ——— (2019). At Home at the Castle: Lifestyles at the Medieval Strongholds of Östergötland, AD 1200–1530. Linköping: Östergötland County Administration. ISBN 978-91-7488-477-7.
- ——— (2020). Hemma på borgen. Livsstilar på Östergötlands medeltidsborgar år 1200-1530 [At Home at the Castle: Lifestyles at the Medieval Strongholds of Östergötland, AD 1200–1530] (in Swedish). Linköping: Östergötland County Administration. ISBN 978-91-985270-4-9.

=== Translations ===
- Kiöping, Nils Mattsson; Rundkvist, Martin (2021). Travelogue and Autobiography 1647–1656: Coastal Africa, the Red Sea, Persia, Mesopotamia, Coastal India, Sri Lanka, South-East Asia. Historiska serien. Vol. 39. Translated by Rundkvist, Martin. Stockholm: Kungl. Vitterhets Historie och Antikvitets Akademien. ISBN 978-91-88763-26-6.
- Lord Dunsany (2025) [Idle Days 1st pub. 1910]. Sorglösa dagar på Yann och andra fantastiska berättelser [Idle Days on the Yann and other Fantastic Stories] (in Swedish). Translated by Rundkvist, Martin. Hastur förlag. ISBN 978-91-86835-09-5.
- Nesbit, E. (2025). En natt i lusthuset: och andra kusliga historier [A Night in the Pavilion: And other Spooky Stories] (in Swedish). Translated by Rundkvist, Martin. Hastur förlag. ISBN 978-91-86835-67-5.
- Stevenson, Robert Louis (2026). Markheim och andra sällsamma berättelser [Markheim and other strange stories] (in Swedish). Translated by Rundkvist, Martin. Hastur förlag. ISBN 978-91-86835-70-5.

=== Other ===
- Rundkvist, Martin (1992). Svenska knoppringar, vulstringar och vulstförsedda ringsöljor [Swedish knobbed and ribbed rings, and ribbed annular brooches] (BA) (in Swedish). Stockholm: Stockholm University.
  - Republished in part as ——— (1996). "Järnålderns ringamuletter med knoppar eller vulster" [Iron Age ring amulets with knobs or ribs]. Fornvännen (in Swedish). 91 (1): 13–25. ISSN 0015-7813.
- ——— (1994). "Skärvstenshögar med gravgömmor i östligaste Mälarområdet" [Burnt mounds with burial deposits in the easternmost Mälaren area]. Fornvännen (in Swedish). 89 (2): 83–89. ISSN 0015-7813.
- ——— (1998). Swedish Seminar Papers in Archaeology: 1991–1996 (PDF). Stockholm Archaeological Reports. Vol. 34. Stockholm: Stockholm University. ISSN 1101-3087.
- ———, ed. (1999). Grave Matters: Eight Studies of First Millennium AD Burials in Crimea, England and Southern Scandinavia. Papers from a Session Held at the European Association of Archaeologists Fourth Annual Meeting in Göteborg 1998. International Series. Vol. 781. Oxford: British Archaeological Reports. doi:10.30861/9781841710013. ISBN 1-84171-001-6.
- ——— (2006). "Notes on Axboe's and Malmer's gold bracteate chronologies". Fornvännen. 101 (5): 348–355. ISSN 0015-7813.
- ——— (2007). Scholarly Journals between the Past and the Future: The Fornvännen Centenary Round-Table Seminar, Stockholm 21 April 2006. Konferenser. Vol. 65. Stockholm: Royal Swedish Academy of Letters, History and Antiquities. ISBN 978-91-7402-368-8.
- ——— & Williams, Howard (2008). "A Viking Boat Grave with Amber Gaming Pieces Excavated at Skamby, Östergötland, Sweden". Medieval Archaeology. 52 (1). Society for Medieval Archaeology: 69–102. doi:10.1179/174581708x335440. S2CID 128570302.
- ——— (2008). "För en liberalisering av de svenska metallsökarreglerna" [For a liberalisation of the Swedish metal detector rules]. Fornvännen (in Swedish). 103 (2): 118–122. ISSN 0015-7813.
- ——— (2010). "Domed oblong brooches of Vendel Period Scandinavia". In Hårdh, Birgitta (ed.). Från romartida skalpeller till senvikingatida urnesspännen: nya materialstudier från Uppåkra [From Roman era scalpels to Late Viking Period Urnes brooches: new studies of finds from Uppåkra]. Uppåkrastudier. Vol. 11. Lund: Lund University. pp. 127–199. ISBN 978-91-89578-33-3.
- Williams, Howard; Rundkvist, Martin & Danielsson, Arne (Spring 2010). "The landscape of a Swedish boat-grave cemetery". Landscapes. 11 (1): 1–24. doi:10.1179/lan.2010.11.1.1. hdl:10034/311915. S2CID 144140435.
- Rundkvist, Martin & Viberg, Andreas (April 2015). "Geophysical Investigations on the Viking Period Platform Mound at Aska in Hagebyhöga Parish, Sweden". Archaeological Prospection. 22 (2): 131–138. Bibcode:2015ArchP..22..131R. doi:10.1002/arp.1500. S2CID 129380525.
- ——— (2015). Arkeologi är choklad, inte potatis [Archaeology is chocolate, not potatoes] (PDF) (in Swedish). Stockholm: Self-published. ISBN 978-91-639-2057-8.
- ——— & Koskinen, Julia Schulte (16 January 2021a). Metal detector survey of the West Cemeteries, Aska in Hagebyhöga, Östergötland (Report).
- ——— & Koskinen, Julia Schulte (26 January 2021b). Metal detector survey of the East Cemetery, Aska in Hagebyhöga, Östergötland (Report).
- ——— & Green, Magnus (2021). "Chivalrous knights in the age of steam: heraldic harness mounts of 19th-century Scandinavia". Post-Medieval Archaeology. 55 (3): 315–321. doi:10.1080/00794236.2021.1978238. S2CID 244199261.
- ——— (2021). "Noble shape, humble metals. Bronze and silver shield-head and snake-head rings of Roman era Scandinavia". Praehistorische Zeitschrift. 96 (2): 571–584. doi:10.1515/pz-2021-2020. S2CID 238424030.
- ——— & Audy, Florent (2022). "Husby in Glanshammar: cloisonné production, Viking Period silver deposition and memorialisation". Praehistorische Zeitschrift. 97 (2): 636–645. doi:10.1515/pz-2022-2016. S2CID 250565438.
- ——— (2022). "Was the longhouse platform at Aska in Hagebyhöga re-used as a härad assembly mound?". Fornvännen. 117 (3): 212–215.
- ——— & Lindgren, Ola (7 October 2022). Excavations in 2021 on the platform mount at Aska in Hagebyhöga parish, Östergötland, Sweden (Report).
- ——— Löfving, Axel; Gustavsson, Rudolf; Heimdahl, Jens & Viberg, Andreas (December 2023). "Gold-foil figures and human skulls in the royal hall at Aska, Hagebyhöga, Östergötland". Antiquity. 97 (396): 1534–1547. doi:10.15184/aqy.2023.157.
- ——— (December 2024). "Early Modern Deviant Burial in Prehistoric Monuments in Sweden". International Journal of Historical Archaeology. 28 (4): 1168–1182. doi:10.1007/s10761-024-00748-4.
- Lindström, Jonathan; Borrman, Hélène; Kitzler Åhfeldt, Laila; Kjellström, Anna; Lidén, Kerstin & Rundkvist, Martin (2025). "Granhammar Man: axed down and thrown into the sea in Late Bronze Age Uppland, Sweden". Praehistorische Zeitschrift [Prehistoric Journal]. 100 (1): 86–98. doi:10.1515/pz-2024-2033.
- Rundkvist, Martin (2026). "Human skull manipulation in Vendel–Viking Period Sweden and Denmark". Praehistorische Zeitschrift [Prehistoric Journal]. 101 (1): 281–291. doi:10.1515/pz-2024-2041.
