= Dick Hall =

Dick Hall may refer to:

- Dick Hall (baseball) (1930–2023), American baseball player
- Dick Hall (soccer) (born 1945), English soccer player
- Dick Hall (Australian footballer) (1872–1906), Australian rules footballer
- Dick Hall (writer) (1937–2003), Australian writer
- Dick Wick Hall (1877–1926), American humorist

== See also ==
- Richard Hall (disambiguation)
