= Ailsa Mainman =

British archaeologist and ceramics specialist

Academic background
- Education: University of Sheffield

Academic work
- Discipline: Archaeology; History
- Sub-discipline: Early-medieval archaeology Ceramics
- Institutions: University of York; York Archaeological Trust

Ailsa Jean Mainman FSA is a British archaeologist and pottery specialist.

== Career ==
Mainman completed her PhD at the University of Sheffield and is now a research associate at the University of York. She is a former assistant director of York Archaeological Trust.

She was elected as a Fellow of the Society of Antiquaries of London on 12 January 1989.

== Personal life ==
In 1991 Mainman married fellow archaeologist Richard Hall (1949–2011). In 2014 Mainman fulfilled her late husband's "last wish" by helping to publish the final volume in a progressive series of publications about York Archaeological Trust's excavations of Jorvik.

== Select publications ==
- MacGregor, A., Mainman, A. J. and Rogers, N. S. H. 1999. Craft, industry and everyday life: bone, antler, ivory and horn from Anglo-Scandinavian and medieval York (Archaeology of York 17/12). York, York Archaeological Trust.
- Mainman, A. J. and Rogers, N. S. H. 2000. Craft, Industry, and Everyday Life: Finds from Anglo-Scandinavian York (Archaeology of York 17/14). York, York Archaeological Trust.
- Mainman, A. J. and Jenner, A. 2013. Medieval Pottery from York (Archaeology of York 16/9). York, York Archaeological Trust.
- Mainman, A. J. and Hall, R. 2015. "Eoforwic: Post Roman and Anglian York", The British Historic Town Atlas Vol V.
