= Welsh Australian Rules Football League =

- Formerly: Welsh Australian Football League (Aussie Rules Wales)
- Sport: Australian rules football
- First season: 2007
- No. of teams: 4
- Country: Wales
- Headquarters: Cardiff, Wales
- Most recent champion: South Cardiff Panthers
- Most titles: South Cardiff Panthers (3)
- Website: warfl.org.uk

Australian rules football (known locally as "Aussie Rules") has been played on an organised basis in Wales since 2007. The sport is played by both men and women and there are clubs in Cardiff, Swansea, Bridgend, Cwmbran and Penarth. The main competition is the Welsh and England Australian Rules Football League (WARFL, Welsh: Cynghrair Pêl-droed Rheolau Awstralaidd Cymru) who is also the controlling body of the sport in the country. The WARFL runs a senior men's competition and a 3 team women's WWEAFL 9-a-side competition.

The original six WARFL teams were named after clubs in the South Australian National Football League. Prior to 2007 some clubs played in the BARFL though the proximity of these English clubs to the Welsh clubs helped facilitate the Welsh league.

Internationally Wales has fielded a standalone team at the Euro Cup achieving its best results for the women's with 4th place in 2022 and runners up in the men's in 2023 for all other international tournaments Wales is represented by composite the Great Britain team.

== History ==
The earliest recorded match in Wales was in 1944 when the 462 Squadron played against the second Sunderland Squadron formed teams based on State of Origin (Victoria vs Western Australia) to play a match at Pembroke Dock.

Regular competition in Wales began with the formation of Aussie Rules Wales in September 2006. Thereafter three teams were formed in 2007 being Cardiff Double Blues, South Cardiff Panthers and Swansea Magpies and competed in a 9-a-side format with modified rules in the Welsh division (WAFL) of the ARUK National league. Also the Swindon Devils from England's West Country competed as a guest fourth side. The season concluded with the Swindon Devils defeating South Cardiff by 71 points to win the inaugural (and only) WAFL Premiership.

Aussie Rules Wales then ceased trading in January 2008 and was replaced by the independently run WARFL, which seeks to become the national governing body of the sport in Wales.

The inaugural WARFL Premiership season kicked off in May 2008, with the Cardiff Double Blues, South Cardiff Panthers and Swansea Magpies competing in 9 rounds in 9-a-side format with full AFL rules. The Cardiff Double Blues eventually defeated South Cardiff Panthers by 94 points to win the inaugural 2008 WARFL Premiership. South Cardiff Panthers' David James was awarded best on ground.

In 2009 Gwent Tigers based in Newport joined the league in a 12 round competition with the 9-a-side format unchanged. Also that year the WARFL introduced a pre-season competition known as the Cymru Clwb Cup played at Waunarlwydd RFC in Swansea where the three foundation clubs competed. The Cardiff Double Blues won the tournament winning both of their round robin matches.

At the end of the Premiership South Cardiff Panthers played Swansea Magpies at Llandaff Fields in Cardiff where South Cardiff won by two points to win their first Premiership after being runners up in 2007 and 2008. Swansea Magpies' Matthew Hopkins was awarded best on ground.

2010 saw further expansion of the league with the Vale Warriors based at Barry RFC entering. The second Cymru Clwb Challenge was played at Llandaff Fields with all WARFL clubs playing except for Gwent Tigers who did not field a team due to player unavailability. South Cardiff Panthers won all their matches winning the competition with Cardiff Doubles Blues player Rhys Morgan awarded player of the tournament.

That year the league ran as a 10 round competition with each team playing 8 matches and having 2 byes and continuing in the 9-a-side format. On 24 July the top of the league South Cardiff Panthers played against Swansea Magpies at Barry RFC where South Cardiff won by 71 points to be the first club in WARFL history to win consecutive Premierships. South Cardiff Panthers' ruckman Chris James was awarded best on ground.

The Bridgend Eagles and Bristol Dockers joined the league in 2011 with Gwent Tigers not fielding a team that year.

== Welsh and England Australian Rules Football League (WARFL) ==
The league is organised in a similar fashion to the SANFL, with the top two teams at the end of the "home and away" season playing off in the Grand Final for the Premiership Cup.

Location map of current clubs in the league.

Club	Year established	Home Ground	Website	Cymru Clwb Cup winners	League winners	League Premiership winners
Bristol Dockers	1991	Aretians RFC, Little Stoke, Bristol	Facebook page	0	1 (2012)	0
Cardiff Panthers	2007	Sport Wales National Centre (Pontcanna Pitch), Cardiff	Facebook page	4 (2010, 2011, 2012 & 2013)	4 (2009, 2010, 2011 & 2013)	4 (2009, 2010, 2011 & 2012)
Vale Vikings (formerly Cardiff Double Blues)	2007	Old Penarthians RFC, Penarth	Facebook page	1 (2009)	1 (2008)	1 (2008)
Chippenham Redbacks (formerly Bath and Wiltshire)	2007	Chippenham RFC, Chippenham	Facebook page			

=== Former clubs ===
Club	Year established	Home Ground	Website
Bridgend Eagles	2010	Heol-y-Cyw RFC, Bridgend	
Gwent Tigers	2008	North Fields Recreation Ground, Cwmbran	Facebook page
Swansea Magpies	2007	Swansea University, Swansea	Facebook page
Vale Warriors	2009		

=== WARFL League and Grand Final results ===
Year	League winners	Premiers	Grand Final venue	Grand Final score
2007	Swindon Devils	Swindon Devils	St Peters RFC, Cardiff	Swindon Devils 20.8 (128) def South Cardiff Panthers 7.15 (57)
2008	Cardiff Double Blues	Cardiff Double Blues	St Peters RFC, Cardiff	Cardiff Double Blues 18.18 (126) def South Cardiff Panthers 2.20 (32)
2009	South Cardiff Panthers	South Cardiff Panthers	Llandaff Fields, Cardiff	South Cardiff Panthers 8.10 (58) def Swansea Magpies 8.8 (56)
2010	South Cardiff Panthers	South Cardiff Panthers	Barry RFC, Barry	South Cardiff Panthers 17.20 (121) def Swansea Magpies 8.3 (51)
2011	South Cardiff Panthers	South Cardiff Panthers	Pontcanna Pitch, Sport Wales National Centre	South Cardiff Panthers def Bristol Dockers
2012	Bristol Dockers	South Cardiff Panthers	Dings Crusaders RFC	Bristol Dockers 6.7 (43) def South Cardiff Panthers 23.23 (161)
2013	South Cardiff Panthers	South Cardiff Panthers	Pontcanna Pitch, Sport Wales National Centre	South Cardiff Panthers (0) drew Chippenham Redbacks (0)
2014		South Cardiff Panthers		
2015		Bristol Dockers		
2016		South Cardiff Panthers		
2017		Bristol Dockers		
2018		Bristol Dockers		Bristol Dockers 14.14 (98) def South Cardiff Panthers 5.17 (47)
2019		South Cardiff Panthers		
2020	Not contested			
2021	Not contested			
2022	South Cardiff Panthers	South Cardiff Panthers	Llandaff Fields	South Cardiff Panthers (96) def Bristol Dockers (30)

=== Player awards ===
Year	Best & Faires	Top Goal Scorer	Rookie of the Year
2007	Daniel Morgan-Kane South Cardiff Panthers	Gareth Jones South Cardiff Panthers	Ed Doe South Cardiff Panthers
2008	David Saunders Cardiff Double Blues	Tom Judson Cardiff Double Blues	Gareth Llewellyn South Cardiff Panthers
2009	Rhys Jones Swansea Magpies	Andrew Atack South Cardiff Panthers	Gareth Sturge Cardiff Double Blues
2010	David Gamble South Cardiff Panthers	Leigh Merrington South Cardiff Panthers	Joshua Davey South Cardiff Panthers

== League and National representative teams ==
Wales
- Nickname(s): Red Dragons
- Governing body: AFL Wales

International Cup
- Appearances: 0

Two representative sides are organised by the WARFL, one to represent the national league which is an all-stars side known as the "WARFL Red Devils" drawn solely from the WARFL regardless of nationality.

The other representative team organised by the WARFL is the Welsh national team known as the "Cymru Red Dragons". The Red Dragons is primarily made up of players from the WARFL, however does include Welsh players from other leagues around the world.

WARFL Red Devils

The Red Devils first played in the 2007 AFL Britain National Championships known as the Brit Cup, representing the first Welsh side in the tournament's history. Thereafter the Red Devils have played in every Brit Cup including the 2010 tournament but 2012 was the year the Brit Cup made Wales its home for next 12 months as the Devils made the Grand Final that year beating the Favourites the Midland Tigers taking top spot and making history. The Red Devils have also appeared at the 2008 "Haggis Cup" the first time a Welsh team had played in Scotland and again in 2009 but did not field a team in 2010.

Cymru Red Dragons

In November 2007, the Red Dragons became the first all-Welsh representative team when they hosted the England Dragonslayers in Cardiff for the "Dragon Cup", England winning by 30 points.

In the second series of the Dragon Cup, the Cymru Red Dragons defeated 2008 EU Cup champions England Dragonslayers in Reading and Newport by 92 points (aggregate score over two tests) to win the Dragon Cup for the first time. However in September 2009 England defeated Wales in Cardiff and London to regain the Dragon Cup.

The inaugural "Bute Series" for the Crichton-Stuart Cup with Scotland Clansmen (which was also Scotland's first ever Australian Rules football international) was played in Glasgow and Cardiff over two tests in October 2009. The Cymru Red Dragons won the series on aggregate of 30 points with Scotland winning the first test and Wales winning at home in Cardiff the following week.

=== Results ===
Date	Competitor	Tournament	Venue	Score	Series winner
3 Nov 2007	England	Dragon Cup	St Peters RFC, Cardiff, Wales	Cymru Red Dragons 9.7 (61) England Dragonslayers 12.19 (91)	England won by 30 points
18 Oct 2008	England	Dragon Cup - 1st Test	Kings Park, Reading, England	England Dragonslayers 7.7 (49) Cymru Red Dragons 11.13 (79)	
25 Oct 2008	England	Dragon Cup - 2nd Test	Tredegar Park, Newport, Wales	Cymru Red Dragons 15.16 (106) England Dragonslayers (44)	Wales 2-0
12 Sep 2009	England	Dragon Cup - 1st Test	St Colmcilles GAA, Cardiff, Wales	Cymru Red Dragons 6.13 (49) England Dragonslayers 6.18 (54)	
19 Sep 2009	England	Dragon Cup - 2nd Test	London, England	England Dragonslayers 13.10 (88) Cymru Red Dragons 3.3 (21)	England 2-0
17 Oct 2009	Scotland	Bute Series - 1st Test	Bellahouston Park, Glasgow, Scotland	Scotland Clansmen 8.12 (60) Cymru Red Dragons 7.2 (44)	
24 Oct 2009	Scotland	Bute Series - 2nd Test	St Colmcilles GAA, Cardiff, Wales	Cymru Red Dragons (66) Scotland Clansmen (36)	Wales 1-1 (30 points on aggregate)
7 Aug 2010	Scotland	Bute Series - 1st Test	St Colmcilles GAA, Cardiff, Wales	Cymru Red Dragons 9.8 (62) Scotland Clansmen 26.28 (184)	
21 Aug 2010	Scotland	Bute Series - 2nd Test	Victoria Park, Glasgow, Scotland	Scotland Clansmen 12.11 (83) Cymru Red Dragons 5.6 (36)	Scotland 2-0
18 Sep 2010	England	Dragon Cup - 1st Test	Chippenham RFC, England	England Dragonslayers 6.14 (48) Cymru Red Dragons 4.12 (36)	
26 Sep 2010	England	Dragon Cup - 2nd Test	St Colmcilles GAA, Cardiff, Wales	Cymru Red Dragons 4.4 (28) England Dragonslayers 15.12 (102)	England 2-0
2 Oct 2010	Austria	Euro Cup - 1st Round	Parabiago, Milan, Italy	Cymru Red Dragons 5.10 (40) Austria Kangaroos 0.4 (4)	
2 Oct 2010	Croatia	Euro Cup - 2nd Round	Parabiago, Milan, Italy	Croatia Knights 7.9 (51) Cymru Red Dragons 4.0 (24)	
2 Oct 2010	Spain	Euro Cup – Plate Round	Parabiago, Milan, Italy	Spain Bulls 5.1 (31) Cymru Red Dragons 3.6 (24)	Wales (7th place) Croatia winners
1 Oct 2011	Northern Ireland	Euro Cup – Plate Round	Belfast, Northern Ireland	Spain Bulls (Unknown) Cymru Red Dragons (Unknown)	Wales (5th place) Ireland winners
Aug 2012	England	Home Nations Cup	Cardiff, Wales	England Dragonslayers (Unknown) Cymru Red Dragons (Unknown)	Wales (2nd place) England winners

== Player Awards ==
Year	Best & Fairest	Top Goal Scorer	Rookie of the Year
2007	Tom Case Swindon Devils	Ed Doe South Cardiff Panthers	N/A
2008	David James South Cardiff Panthers	Ed Doe South Cardiff Panthers	N/A
2009	David Saunders South Cardiff Panthers	Gareth Sturge Cardiff Double Blues	N/A
2010	Gareth Griffiths Vale Warriors	Andrew Atack South Cardiff Panthers	George Llewellyn Portsmouth Pirates

=== Great Britain Bulldogs ===
As of 2013, 15 players from the WARFL have been selected to represent the Great Britain Bulldogs, these being:

Andrew Atack (Cardiff Panthers), Tim Atkins (Swansea Magpies), David Carpenter (Cardiff Double Blues), Liam Corbett (Cardiff Panthers), Joshua Davey (Cardiff Panthers), Ed Doe (Cardiff Panthers), Tom Gillard (Cardiff Double Blues), Mark Horsman (Cardiff Panthers), Chris James (Cardiff Panthers) David James (Cardiff Panthers), Tom Judson (Cardiff Double Blues), David Saunders (Cardiff Panthers), Gareth Sturge (Cardiff Double Blues), Jon Saunders (South Cardiff Panthers), Owain Ryland (South Cardiff Panthers) & Eliot Rich (South Cardiff Panthers).

== Notable players ==
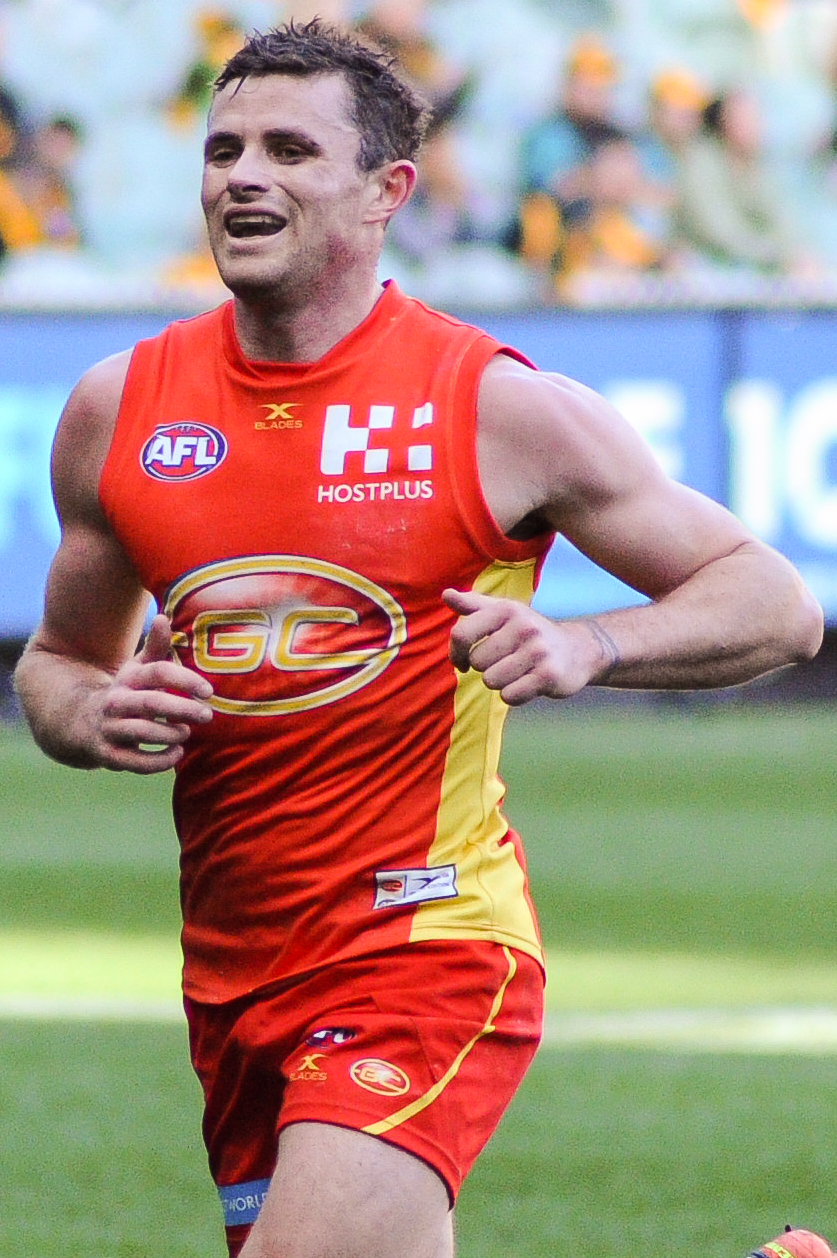
Pearce Hanley playing for the Gold Coast in 2017

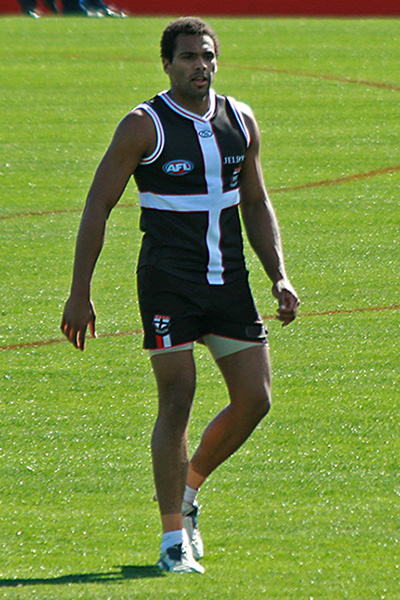
James Gwilt playing for St Kilda in 2009

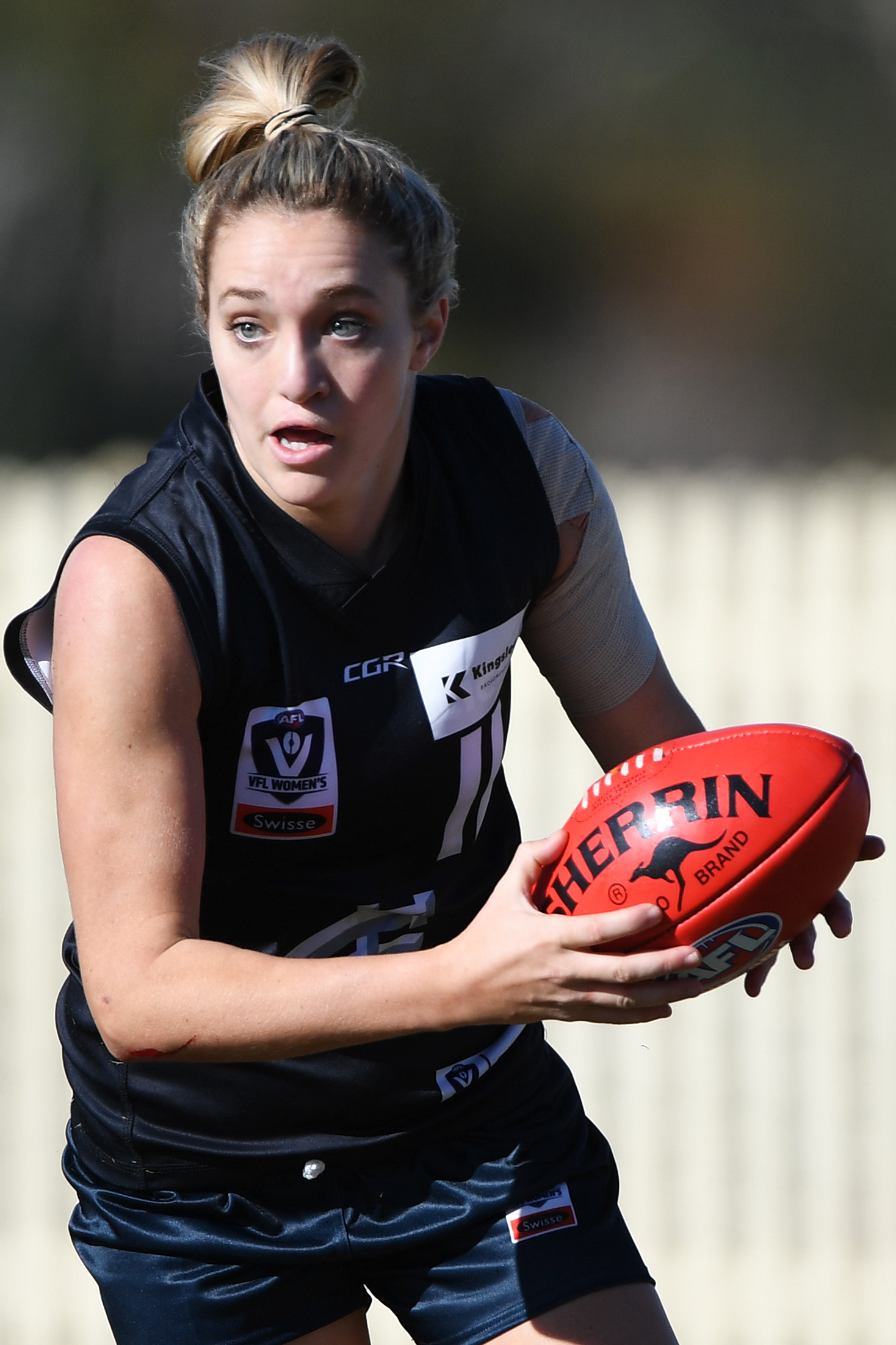
Jess Hosking playing for Carlton in 2019

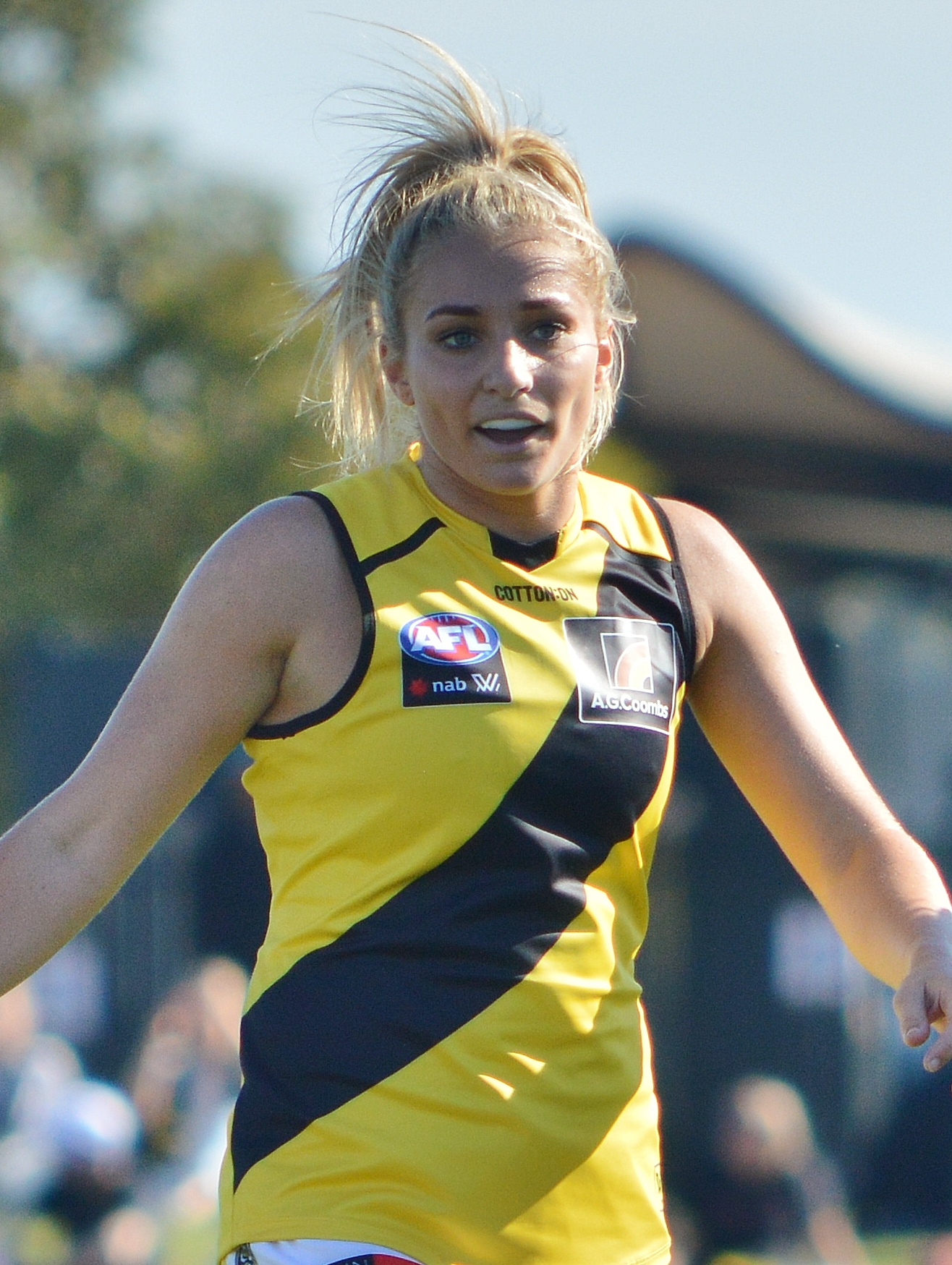
Sarah Hosking playing for Richmond in 2021

Welsh AFL and AFLW players

=== Men's ===
Currently on an AFL senior list

Player	Club/s	AFL Years*	AFL Matches*	AFL Goals*	Connections to Wales, References
Cian Hanley	Brisbane Lions	2015-2018	-	-	Mother
Pearce Hanley	Brisbane Lions, Gold Coast	2008-2020	169	60	Mother
James Gwilt	St Kilda, Essendon	2005-2016	152	25	Father
John McCarthy	North Melbourne, Fitzroy	1986-1996	163	178	Born, Parents
Dick Hall	Collingwood	1897	1	0	Born Bedwellty.

=== Women's ===
Currently on an AFLW senior list

Player	Club/s	AFLW Years*	AFLW Matches*	AFLW Goals*	Connections to Wales, References
Georja Davies	Gold Coast	2026-	10	0	Born, parents.
Darcie Davies	Gold Coast	2023-	40	13	Born, parents.
Giselle Davies	Gold Coast, Sydney	2022-	19	2	Born, parents
Sarah Hosking	Carlton, Richmond	2017-	77	13	Parent
Jess Hosking	Carlton, Richmond, West Coast	2017-2025	61	6	Parent

== See also ==
- Australian rules football in Wales
- List of Australian rules football leagues outside Australia
