= Roberta Gilchrist =

British archaeologist

- Born: Roberta Lynn Gilchrist; 28 June 1965 (age 61)
- Awards: Fellow of the Society of Antiquaries of London (2002); Fellow of the British Academy (2008)

Academic background
- Education: University of York
- Thesis: The archaeology of female piety: gender, ideology and material culture in later medieval England (c. 1050-1550)

Academic work
- Discipline: Archaeology
- Sub-discipline: Medieval archaeology; Archaeology of religion; Gender archaeology
- Institutions: University of East Anglia; University of Reading

Roberta Lynn Gilchrist, FSA, FBA (born 28 June 1965) is a Canadian-born archaeologist and academic specialising in the medieval period, whose career has been spent in the United Kingdom. She is Professor of Archaeology and Dean of Research at the University of Reading.

== Early life and education ==
Gilchrist was born on 28 June 1965 in Canada. She moved to the UK in 1982 to study archaeology at the University of York. She graduated with a Bachelor of Arts (BA) degree in 1986 and a Doctor of Philosophy (DPhil) degree in 1990. Her doctoral thesis was titled "The archaeology of female piety: gender, ideology and material culture in later medieval England (c. 1050–1550)".

== Academic career ==
Gilchrist began her academic career in 1990, when she became a lecturer at University of East Anglia. In 1996, she moved to the University of Reading to take up the position of Professor of Archaeology. She was previously the Head of School of Archaeology, Geography and Environmental Science. Since 2015, she has been Dean of Research for Heritage and Creativity.

In addition to her university work, she has held a number of positions. From 1993 to 2005, she was the consultant archaeologist to Norwich Cathedral. From 1997 to 2006, she was Editor of World Archaeology, an academic journal specialising in all aspects of archaeology. She served as president of the Society for Medieval Archaeology from 2004 to 2007.

She specialises in the archaeology of the medieval period in the UK, especially in relation to the archaeology of religion, and the archaeology of gender.

Gilchrist is a member of the Antiquity Trust, which supports the publication of the archaeology journal Antiquity.

== Honours ==
In 2002, Gilchrist was elected a Fellow of the Society of Antiquaries of London (FSA). In 2008, she was elected a Fellow of the British Academy (FBA). Also in 2008, she won the Society for Medieval Archaeology's Martyn Jope Award for "the best novel interpretation, application of analytical method or presentation of new findings" published in that year's volume of Medieval Archaeology.

In February 2016, Gilchrist won the "Archaeologist of the Year" award in the Current Archaeology Awards, which are voted for by the public, and recognise people who have made outstanding contributions to archaeology. In 2018 she was elected an Honorary Fellow of Jesus College, Cambridge.

== Books ==
- (Edited with H. Mytum) The Archaeology of Rural Monasteries. Oxford: British Archaeological Reports (BAR 203), 1989
- (With M. Oliva) Religious Women in Medieval East Anglia. Norwich: Centre of East Anglian Studies, 1993
- (Edited with H. Mytum) Advances in Monastic Archaeology: Conference on urban monasteries. Oxford: Tempus Reperatum, 1993
- Gender and Material Culture: the archaeology of religious women. London: Routledge, 1994
- Contemplation and Action: the other monasticism. Leicester: Leicester University Press, 1995
- Gender and Archaeology: Contesting the Past. London: Routledge, 1999
- (Edited with D. Gaimster) The Archaeology of Reformation. London: Maneys, 2003
- (With B. Sloane) Requiem: the Medieval Monastic Cemetery in Britain. London: Museum of London Archaeological Service, 2005
- Norwich Cathedral Close: the Evolution of the English Cathedral Landscape. Woodbridge: Boydell and Brewer, 2005
- Medieval Life: Archaeology and the Life Course. Woodbridge: Boydell and Brewer, 2012
- (With C. Green) Glastonbury Abbey: archaeological investigations 1904-79, 2015
- Sacred Heritage: Monastic Archaeology, Identities, Beliefs, Cambridge University Press, 2020, ISBN 978-1108496544
