= Naomi Sykes =

Archaeologist

Naomi Sykes FSA
- Occupation: zooarchaeologist
- Employer: University of Exeter

Naomi Sykes FSA is a zooarchaeologist and is currently the Lawrence Professor of Archaeology at the University of Exeter. Sykes researches human-animal relations in the past.

== Biography ==
Sykes' early work studied the zooarchaeology of the Norman Conquest in Britain. Her thesis was completed at 2001 at the University of Southampton. Sykes was previously based at the University of Nottingham, and is currently the Lawrence Professor of Archaeology at the University of Exeter.

In 2011, Sykes won the Society for Medieval Archaeology's Martyn Jope Award for "the best novel interpretation, application of analytical method or presentation of new findings" published in that year's volume of Medieval Archaeology along with co-author Ruth F. Carden.

In 2014 Sykes published Beastly Questions, which has been described as "a lucid, thought-provoking and challenging review of the state of the discipline."

Sykes was elected as a Fellow of the Society of Antiquaries in 2008.

She is a member of the editorial board of World Archaeology journal.

== Selected publications ==
- Sykes, N. 2004. The dynamics of status symbols: Wildfowl exploitation in England AD 410–1550. Archaeological journal 161 (1), 82-105.
- Sykes, N. 2004. The Introduction of Fallow Zooarchaeological Perspective to Britain. Environmental Archaeology 9, 75–83.
- Sykes, N. J., White, J., Hayes, T. E., & Palmer, M. R. 2006. Tracking animals using strontium isotopes in teeth: the role of fallow deer (Dama dama) in Roman Britain. Antiquity 80(October 2005), 948–959.
- Sykes, N. 2010. Deer, land, knives and halls: social change in early medieval England. The Antiquaries Journal 90, 175-193
- Sykes, N. 2010. Extinctions and Invasions: a Social History of British Fauna. Windgather.
- Sykes, N., Karis Baker & Ruth Carden (2011), Deer and People: Past, Present and Future (Handbook of the International Conference, 8–11 September 2011), University of Lincoln, 2011
- Sykes, N. J., Baker, K. H., Carden, R. F., Higham, T. F. G., Hoelzel, A. R., & Stevens, R. E. 2011. New evidence for the establishment and management of the European fallow deer ( Dama dama dama ) in Roman Britain. Journal of Archaeological Science 38(1), 156–165. http://doi.org/10.1016/j.jas.2010.08.024
- Sykes, N. 2012. A social perspective on the introduction of exotic animals : the case of the chicken. World Archaeology 44(1), 158–169.
- Sykes, N. 2014. Beastly Questions: Animal Answers to Archaeological Issues. London: Bloomsbury.
