= Howard Williams (archaeologist) =

British academic

Professor Howard Williams FSA
- Born: 1972 (age 53–54)
- Occupations: Archaeologist, academic

Academic background
- Education: University of Reading, MA, PhD; University of Sheffield, BSc

Academic work
- Discipline: Archaeology
- Sub-discipline: Early Middle Ages; archaeology of Britain
- Institutions: Trinity College Carmarthen; Cardiff University; University of Exeter; University of Chester
- Doctoral students: Rachel Swallow
- Notable works: Death and Memory in Early Medieval Britain (2006)
- Website: Howard Williams's blog

Howard M. R. Williams FSA (born 1972) is a British archaeologist and academic who is professor of archeology at the University of Chester in England. His research focuses on the study of death, burial and memory in early medieval Britain.

== Biography ==
Williams obtained a BSc from the University of Sheffield, and later attended the University of Reading where he received a MS and a PhD. degree. He has taught archaeology at Trinity College Carmarthen, Cardiff University and the University of Exeter, and since 2008 at the University of Chester.

Williams's research focuses on the archaeology of early medieval Britain. He has published scholarly journals, books, and co-published books on the archaeology of medieval Britain, death and burial, Vikings, and landscapes and memory.

In 2017 Williams co-founded the Offa's Dyke Collaboratory: an initiative for new research into Offa's Dyke, Wat's Dyke and their landscape contexts. The Collaboratory also involves the Clwyd-Powys Archaeological Trust, the Wye Valley Area of Outstanding Natural Beauty, the Royal Commission on the Ancient and Historical Monuments of Wales and the Offa's Dyke Association. In 2019 Williams led the establishment of the Offa's Dyke Journal, an open access journal 'promoting the archaeology, history and heritage of frontiers and borderlands focusing on the Anglo-Welsh border'; the journal is edited by Williams and Liam Delaney.

In December 2018, Williams was featured in the BBC 4 documentary Beyond the Walls: In Search of the Celts.

== Awards and recognition ==
On 16 February 2006, Williams was elected a Fellow of the Society of Antiquaries (FSA). In 2017, he won the Society for Medieval Archaeology's Martyn Jope Award for "the best novel interpretation, application of analytical method or presentation of new findings" published in that year's volume of Medieval Archaeology, along with co-author Patricia Murrieta-Flores.

== Selected publications ==
- Bradley, R.J. & Williams, H. (eds). The Past in the Past: The Reuse of Ancient Monuments. World Archaeology 30 (1). London: Routledge. (1998, editor)
- Williams, H. (ed.). Archaeologies of Remembrance: Death and Memory in Past Societies. New York: Kluwer/Plenum. (2003, editor)
- Williams, H. Death and Memory in Early Medieval Britain. Cambridge: Cambridge University Press. (2006)
- Semple, S. & Williams, H. (eds). Early Medieval Mortuary Practices. Anglo-Saxon Studies in Archaeology & History 14. Oxford: Oxbow. (2007, editor)
- Rundkvist, M. & Williams, H. (2008). "A Viking Boat Grave with Amber Gaming Pieces Excavated at Skamby, Östergötland, Sweden". Medieval Archaeology. 52 (1). Society for Medieval Archaeology: 69–102. doi:10.1179/174581708x335440. S2CID 128570302.
- Sayer, D. & Williams, H. (eds). Mortuary Practices & Social Identities in the Middle Ages: Essays in Burial Archaeology in Honour of Heinrich Härke. Exeter: University of Exeter Press. (2009, editor)
- Williams, H., Kirton, J. and Gondek, M. (eds) Early Medieval Stone Monuments: Materiality, Biography, Landscape. Woodbridge: Boydell and Brewer. (2015, editors)
- Williams, H. and Giles, M. (eds) Archaeologists and the Dead. Oxford: Oxford University Press. (2016, editors)
- Williams, H. (ed.) Mortuary citations: Death and Memory in the Viking World. Special issue of the European Journal of Archaeology 19(3). (2016, guest editor).
- Cerezo-Román, J. I., Wessman, A. and Williams, H. (eds) Cremation and the Archaeology of Death. Oxford: Oxford University Press. (2017, editors)
