= Barbara Hall (editor) =

British crossword compiler (1923–2022)

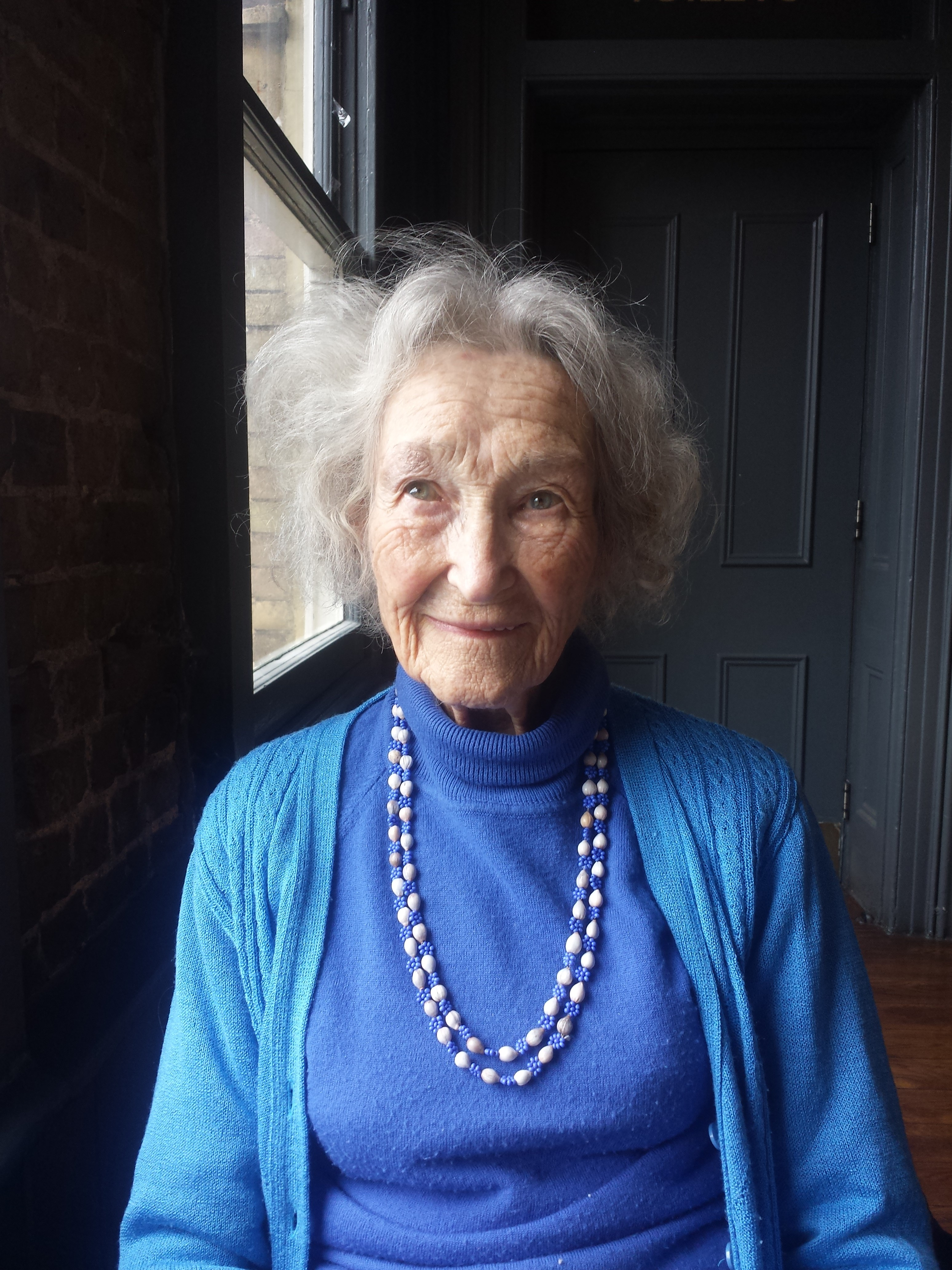
Barbara Hall MBE aged 95

Barbara Hall MBE (3 February 1923 – 18 April 2022) was an English crossword compiler, advice columnist and writer. From the early 1980s until her retirement in 2010 she was the Crossword Puzzles Editor for the Sunday Times. In a career spanning seven decades, she edited, created and set puzzles for the Daily Mail, The Yorkshire Post, The Sunday Times and The Observer, as well as many other newspapers, making her Britain's longest serving crossword compiler.

== Early life ==
Barbara Hall was born on 3 February 1923 in Derby, England, and grew up in Aston-on-Trent. Her father Lawrence Shelton Taylor served during World War I as a radio operator and air navigator before becoming an accountant on the railways. During World War II he re-joined the RAF as a reservist and trainer. Her mother Olive Taylor (née Bradbury) served in World War I on the Western Front in the Women's Auxiliary Army Corps, and worked during World War II as a Braille teacher.

After gaining a scholarship to attend Parkfield Cedars Grammar School in Derby, Hall had her first crossword published, when she was 15 years old, in the Northern edition of the Daily Mail in 1938. This was as a result of winning a competition, for which she was paid 2 guineas. She intended to become an elocution teacher, having been accepted to study at the London Academy of Music and Dramatic Art. However, her plans were disrupted by the Second World War. From 1943 until 1946, she served with the Women's Royal Naval Service, working as a coder, preparing orders for ships of the North Sea Coastal Command. After the war, and her marriage to the journalist Richard Seymour Hall, she developed her career as a crossword compiler and writer.

== Career ==
The Hall family moved to Africa in 1955, where she worked part-time on the Central African Mail newspaper, a publication edited by her husband, which later become the Zambia Daily Mail. During her 12 years living in Northern Rhodesia (later Zambia when it became an independent country in 1964), she wrote numerous feature articles. Her advice column, "Tell me Josephine", was one of the paper's most popular features, and resulted in a book, including a foreword by Dr Kenneth Kaunda, the first President of Zambia, which was translated into over 19 languages. Barbara Hall continued to support her husband's work, writing articles and puzzles both before and after he became the editor of the Times of Zambia. Whilst working in the newspaper industry in Zambia, she met many eminent people, including Jomo Kenyatta, Indira Gandhi and Chiang Kai-shek. She had a deep love of Zambia, worked constantly to promote its independence, was a founder of The Zambia Society, and stayed close friends with Dr Kenneth Kaunda and his family.

After returning to the United Kingdom in 1967, she continued to compile crosswords and puzzles, alongside articles, reviews and features, which appeared in a wide range of publications. She made a specialty of themed puzzles and produced scores of these on a wide variety of subjects including railways, yachting, wine, food and gardening. She developed a loyal following for her Bookwise quiz in the Sunday Times, and her crosswords were syndicated across the globe. She was regularly interviewed or spoke about her life as a crossword compiler on the BBC and other broadcast media.

She received an MBE in 2007 for services to the newspaper industry.

Hall retired from the Sunday Times in 2010, at the age of 87, though continued to compile crosswords for The Australian newspaper weekend edition until late 2011, and on a voluntary basis for local charities for some years.

== Personal life and death ==
During her 30-year marriage to Richard Seymour Hall, she had five children, all boys. They divorced in 1973, and she never remarried. Hall lived out her brief retirement in Camberwell, South London, before dying suddenly at home on 18 April 2022, at the age of 99. Hall was described by her son Simon as "an avid Guardian reader and staunch republican."

== Published works ==
- Hall, Barbara; Jewell, Derek & Jewell, Elizabeth (2 May 1989). Ninth Penguin Book of Sunday Times Crosswords. Penguin. ISBN 978-0-14-008487-0.
- Hall, Barbara (21 May 1992). Sunday Times Crosswords. Vol. 11. HarperCollins Publishers. ISBN 978-0-7230-0447-9.
- Cussans, Thomas (6 October 1994). Hall, Barbara (ed.). Sunday Times Crosswords. Vol. 13. Times Books. ISBN 0-7230-0593-1.
- Hall, Barbara, ed. (7 April 1997). "Sunday Times" Concise Crosswords. Times Books. ISBN 978-0-7230-0930-6.
- Hall, Barbara, ed. (6 November 2000). The "Sunday Times" Concise Crosswords. Vol. Book 1. Collins. ISBN 0-00-711153-3.
- Hall, Barbara, ed. (November 2001). The "Sunday Times" Concise Crosswords. Vol. Book 2. London: HarperCollins UK. ISBN 0-00-712200-4. EAN 9780007122004.
- Hall, Barbara, ed. (4 November 2002). The "Sunday Times" Concise Crosswords. Vol. Book 3. Collins. ISBN 978-0-00-714625-3.
- Hall, Barbara, ed. (October 2003). The "Sunday Times" Concise Crosswords. Vol. Book 4. HarperCollins Publishers. ISBN 978-0-00-716536-0.
- Hall, Barbara, ed. (1 April 2005). The "Sunday Times" Concise Crosswords. Vol. Book 5. HarperCollins UK. ISBN 978-0-00-719839-9.
- Hall, Barbara, ed. (1964). Tell Me Josephine. Simon & Schuster USA. ISBN 0-233-95717-0.
