= Richard Marks (art historian) =

British art historian

Richard Marks FSA, is a British art historian. He has held a number of curating and academic posts in art history in the United Kingdom and researched and written extensively on medieval religious images in a variety of media, including stained glass and illuminated manuscripts.

== Early life ==
Marks was born on 2 July 1945, the birth recorded in Luton, Bedfordshire.

Marks' higher education took place at the Courtauld Institute of Art, London where he gained the degrees of B.A., M.A. and PhD. His doctoral thesis was entitled The stained glass of the collegiate Church of the Holy Trinity, Tattershall (Lincs.).

== Working life ==
Marks commenced his career as a curator at the British Museum before moving north to Glasgow when he was appointed as Keeper of the Burrell Collection. He later returned to the south of England after he was appointed Director of the Royal Pavilion and Museums, Brighton.

An academic career beckoned in 1992 when he was appointed to a personal chair in the History of Art Department at the University of York as Professor in Medieval Stained Glass, a post he held until 2008. In 2006-07 Marks was elected to Visiting Fellowships at Corpus Christi College, University of Oxford, and Churchill College and Fitzwilliam College at the University of Cambridge. He was later made Honorary Professor of Art History, University of Cambridge and Keeper of Works of Art at Fitzwilliam College in 2008, a position he held until 2012.

Marks is Emeritus Professor in the Department of Art History at the University of York. His primary field of research is Gothic Art in a variety of media that includes stained glass, sculpture and illuminated manuscripts.

In 1977 Marks was elected Fellow of the Society of Antiquaries London, and was later to serve in an honoraray capacity as the organisation's vice president. Marks has also been active with the Corpus Vitrearum Medii Aevi project, serving as its International President and contributing to its list of Summary Catalogues of medieval stained glass in the counties of Northamptonshire and Bedfordshire and Buckinghamshire.

Mark's scholarship and experience were in evidence when he was approached by the Victoria and Albert Museum (V&A) to contribute to a future exhibition that was in its very early planning stages in the 1990s. Writing in 2003 in the V&A Conservation Journal, Paul Williamson, then Keeper of Sculpture, Metalwork, Ceramics & Glass at the museum, describes how Marks came to be a key figure in the exhibition 'Art of England 1400-1547' held at the V&A in 2003. Planning for this started as early as 1993 and when, in 1995, soon after Alan Borg became the museum's director, Marks was invited to become the exhibition's guest curator. Marks also co-authored with Williamson the catalogue that accompanied the exhibition.

== Photography ==
Marks' association with Courtauld Institute goes further than his academic studies. Photographs attributed to him appear in the institute's Conway Library. The collection, which includes film and glass negatives as well as prints, consists mainly of architectural and sculptural images and holds the archives of Paul Laib and Anthony Kersting. The collection is currently being digitised as part of the Courtauld Connects Project.

== Selected publications ==
Marks has published extensively in his main areas of research; western art and mainly English art especially stained glass.

=== Books ===
The Art and Science of the Church Screen in Medieval Europe: Making, Meaning, Preserving, 2020, Martlesham, Boydell and Brewer ISBN 978-1783275359 (As joint editor with Spike Bucklow and Lucy Wrapson)

Stained Glass in England During the Middle Ages, 2014, Abingdon, Routledge ISBN 978-1138009141

Studies in Art and Imagery, 2013, London, Pindar Press ISBN 1 904597 38 6

Image and Devotion in Late Medieval England, 2004, Cheltenham, The History Press ISBN 0750914661

The Golden Age of English Manuscript Painting 1200–1500, London, Chaotto and Windus, ISBN 9780701125394

=== Articles ===
"Images of Henry VI", in J. Stratford (ed.), The Lancastrian Court (Harlaxton Medieval Studies, X) (Stamford, 2003), pp. 111–124

"Medieval Stained Glass: recent and future trends in scholarship", The Journal of Stained Glass XXIV (2000), pp. 62–79

"Altarpiece, Image and Devotion: Fourteenth-century Sculpture at Cobham, Kent", in P. Binski and W. Noel (eds.), New Offerings, Ancient Treasures Studies in Medieval Art for George Henderson (Stroud, 2001), pp. 417–444

"The Thirteenth-Century Glazing of Salisbury Cathedral", in L. Keen & T. Cocke (eds.), Medieval Art and Architecture at Salisbury Cathedral (British Archaeological Assoc. Conference Trans., XVII, 1996), pp. 196–120

=== Online Article ===
"The Taylard Family Windows at Gamlingay and Diddlington", Vidimus, Issue 131, April 2020
