= Jane Hawkes =

Art Historian and Medievalist

Jane Hawkes FSA
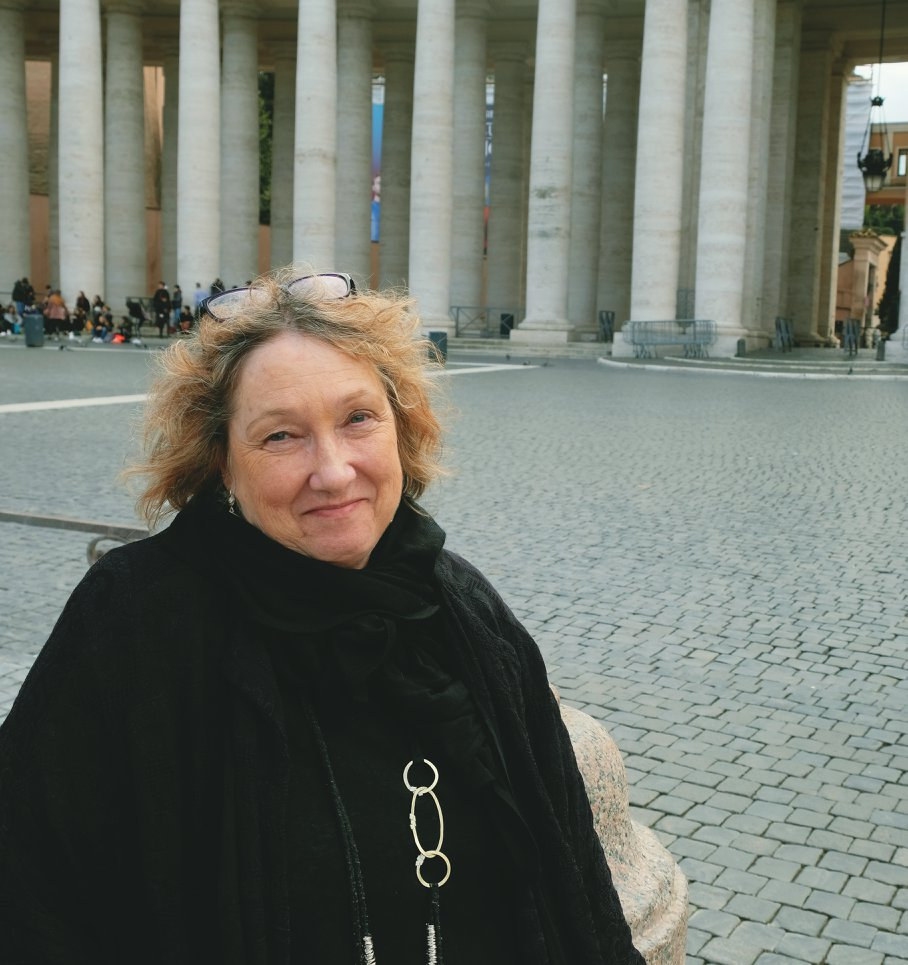

Academic background
- Education: Newcastle University
- Thesis: The non-crucifixion iconography of the pre-Viking sculpture in the north of England :carvings at Hovingham, Masham, Rothbury, Sandbach and Wirksworth (1989)

Academic work
- Discipline: Archaeology; Art History
- Sub-discipline: Anglo-Saxon Sculpture
- Institutions: University of York

Jane Hawkes FSA is a British art historian. She is a Professor of History of Art at the University of York specialising in the art and sculpture of the Anglo-Saxon period.

== Career ==
Hawkes completed her PhD funded by a British Academy scholarship on the "Iconography of Anglo-Saxon sculpture of the pre-Viking period in the North of England". She subsequently worked on a 2-year post-Doctoral fellowship at the University of Newcastle. She has taught at the Universities of Newcastle, Edinburgh, and the National University of Ireland at University College Cork. She is one of the co-investigators of the Corpus of Anglo-Saxon Stone Sculpture project.

She was elected as a fellow of the Society of Antiquaries in December 2017.

In April 2018, Hawkes delivered The Jennifer O'Reilly Memorial Lecture at the University of Cork.
