= South Cardiff Panthers =

Welsh Australian-rules football team

Names
- Full name: South Cardiff Panthers Australian Rules Football Club
- Nickname: Panthers

Club details
- Founded: 2007
- Colours: Blue and White
- Competition: Welsh Australian Rules Football League
- Premierships: 2009, 2010, 2011 & 2012
- Ground: Sport Wales National Centre Pontcanna Pitch

Other information
- Official website: cardiffpanthers.com

The South Cardiff Panthers is an Australian rules football team based in Cardiff, Wales. The club play in the Welsh Australian Rules Football League under a 9-a-side rules format.

== History ==
The South Cardiff Panthers were one of the founding member teams of the WARFL, playing their first season in 2008.

== Past Results ==
Year	Position	Won	Lost	Forfeit	Points
2008	2	5	3	0	10
2009	1	12	0	0	24
2010	1	7	1	0	14
2012	2	7	0	1	28
2013	1	9	1	0	37

From 2012 season onwards: Win = 4Pts Draw = 2 Pts Loss = 1 Pt Forfeit = 0 Pts

== Titles ==
Cymru Clwb Cup winners	League winners	League Premiership winners
3 (2010, 2011, 2012 & 2013)	4 (2009, 2010, 2011 & 2013)	4 (2009, 2010, 2011 & 2012)

== Honours ==
Year	Clubman Of The Year	Rookie Of The Year	Most Improved Player	Players Player Of The Year	Top Goal Scorer	Top Points Scorer
2012	Kim Swain	Owain Ryland	Brian Sparkes	Scott Jones	Scott Jones 24 Goals	Scott Jones 165 Pts

== Notable players ==
Andrew Atack, Edward Doe, Mark Horsman, David James (Great Britain Bulldogs) David Saunders (2010 Euro Cup Team)

== 2012 Squad ==
Note: Flags indicate national team as defined under FIFA eligibility rules; some limited exceptions apply. Players may hold more than one non-FIFA nationality.

No.	Pos.	Nation	Player
1		ENG	Andrew Atack
2		WAL	Joshua Davey
3		WAL	Morris Attard
4		NZL	Bryan Bliss
5		SCO	Mick Ferry
6		SCO	David Gamble
7		ENG	David Holtam
8		ENG	Chris James
9		WAL	James Gibson
10		WAL	David Saunders
11		HKG	Kim Swain
12		WAL	Arron Thomas
13		SCO	Dougie Young
14		WAL	Scott Jones
15		WAL	Jon Saunders
16		WAL	Brian Sparkes
17		AUS	Sam Owen
18		WAL	Lenny James
19		WAL	Owain Ryland
20		NZL	Emmerson Bessell
21		WAL	Chris Strevens

== 2013 Squad ==
Note: Flags indicate national team as defined under FIFA eligibility rules; some limited exceptions apply. Players may hold more than one non-FIFA nationality.

No.	Pos.	Nation	Player
1		ENG	Andrew Atack
2		WAL	Joshua Davey
3		WAL	Morris Attard
4		NZL	Bryan Bliss
5		SCO	David Gamble
6		ENG	Chris James
7		WAL	James Gibson
8		WAL	David Saunders
9		HKG	Kim Swain
10		SCO	Dougie Young
11		WAL	Scott Jones
12		WAL	Jon Saunders
13		WAL	Brian Sparkes
14		AUS	Sam Owen
15		WAL	Owain Ryland
16		NZL	Emmerson Bessell
17		WAL	Chris Strevens
18		WAL	Nick Lewis
19		WAL	Matt Virden
20		ENG	Eliot Rich
21		ENG	Josh Purson
22		WAL	Rhys Clayton
