= Time and Mind =

- Discipline: History
- Language: English

Publication details
- History: 2008–present
- Publisher: Taylor & Francis
- Frequency: Quarterly

Standard abbreviations
- ISO 4: Time Mind

Indexing
- ISSN: 1751-696X (print); 1751-6978 (web)

Links
- Journal homepage

Time and Mind is a peer-reviewed interdisciplinary academic journal published by Taylor & Francis (formerly by Berg Publishers). It covers the cognitive aspects of cross-related disciplines such as archaeology, anthropology and psychology, and how findings about prehistory can help research on the brain and consciousness. The editors are Paul Devereux, John Baker, Christopher Chippindale, Neil Mortimer, George Nash, and Michael Winkelman. The journal explores ideas such as archaeoastronomy, the prehistory of mind, the cognition of memory of place, and ecopsychology.
