= Vale Vikings =

Welsh Australian-rules football team

Names

Club details
- Founded: 2007
- Colours: Dark Blue and Light Blue
- Competition: Welsh Australian Rules Football League
- Premierships: 2008
- Ground: Old Penarthians RFC, St. Mark's Road, Penarth CF64 3PF

Other information
- Official website: [www.facebook.com/ValeVikingsAFC/]

The Vale Vikings are an Australian Rules Football team based in Vale of Glamorgan, Wales. They play in the Welsh Australian Rules Football League under the 9-a-side footy rules. The team was formerly known as the Cardiff Double Blues until 2021.

== History ==
Cardiff Double Blues ARFC has a history of being one of the founder clubs of the Welsh Australian Rules Football League (WARFL) in 2007.

Since that date, Cardiff Double Blues ARFC has achieved considerable success. The club won the inaugural WARFL Premiership and Caerdydd Cup local derby against arch-rivals, the South Cardiff Panthers, in 2008. The club also won the first ever pre-season Cymru Clwb Cup tournament in 2009.

In March 2021, it was announced that the team would be relocating to the Vale of Glamorgan and as a result would change their name to the Vale Vikings.

== Past results ==
Year	Position	Won	Lost	Points
2008	1	7	1	14
2009	3	5	7	10
2010	3	5	3	10

== 2010 squad ==
Note: Flags indicate national team as defined under FIFA eligibility rules; some limited exceptions apply. Players may hold more than one non-FIFA nationality.

No.	Pos.	Nation	Player
1		AUS	Justin Blackwood (Coach)
2		ENG	Ben Coak
3		WAL	Gareth Davies
4		WAL	Peter Day
5		WAL	Craig Farquhar
6		WAL	Leon Ford
7		WAL	Tom Gilard
8		WAL	Chris Hann
9		WAL	Rob Laing
10		WAL	Rhys Lewis
11		WAL	Tristan Lewis (Captain)
12		AUS	Michael Martella
13		WAL	Richard McCoy
14		WAL	Rhys Morgan
15		ENG	Glyn Smith
16		WAL	Gareth Sturge
17		WAL	Ben Thomas
18		AUS	Tony Wolski

== International representation ==
The club has contributed significantly to the growth of Australian-rules football at an international- level in Europe by encouraging its players to strive to represent their national teams and Great Britain. Thus far, Cardiff Double Blues ARFC players have represented the following:

- Cymru Red Dragons (Welsh National Australian Rules Football Team)
- English Dragonslayers (English National Australian Rules Football Team)
- Great Britain Bulldogs (British Representative Team)
- European Legion (European Representative Team)
