= Nicola Rogers =

British archaeologist

Nicola Rogers FSA

Academic work
- Discipline: Archaeology

Nicola S. H. Rogers is a British archaeologist and small finds specialist. Following graduation from Southampton University in 1982 with a degree in Archaeology and History, she started her working career in Oxford, before moving to York in 1988, where she joined York Archaeological Trust as a research assistant. She worked for York Archaeological Trust as a small finds research specialist until 2015, when she set up as a freelancer, under the name Nicola Rogers Archaeology. She retired in 2026. Nicola was elected as a Fellow of the Society of Antiquaries of London on 12 March 2015. She has written numerous small finds reports, both academic and more popular, mostly relating to the archaeology of York. In the past she has been a committee member of CIFA Finds Group as part of the Chartered Institute for Archaeologists.

== Select publications ==
- Rogers, N. S. H. 1993. Anglian and Other Finds from Fishergate (Archaeology of York 17/9). York, York Archaeological Trust.
- Mainman, A. J. and Rogers, N. S. H. 2000. Craft, Industry, and Everyday Life: Finds from Anglo-Scandinavian York (Archaeology of York 17/14). York, York Archaeological Trust.
- Ottaway, P. and Rogers, N. 2002. Craft, Industry, and Everyday Life: Finds from Medieval York (Archaeology of York 17/15). York, York Archaeological Trust.
- Kyriacou, C., Mee, F. and Rogers, N. S. H. 2004. Treasures of York. Ashbourne : Landmark
- Rogers, N.S.H 2012. Medieval Craft and Mystery. York, York Archaeological Trust
