= Richard Hall (Miami University) =

- Interactive map of the Richard Hall area
- Former names: South Hall

General information
- Type: Residence Hall
- Architectural style: Georgian Architecture
- Location: Oxford, OH, United States of America
- Coordinates: 39°30′16.28″N 84°44′8″W
- Construction started: 1940
- Completed: 6 December 1952
- Cost: $946,800 American dollars
- Owner: Miami University

Richard Hall (Miami University) is a dormitory on the Central Quad of Miami University's Oxford, Ohio campus.

== History ==
Built in 1940, this building was originally named "South Hall", but in 1952 a new wing was added to honor a former faculty member of the School of Education, Frances Gibson Richard.

== Frances Gibson Richard ==
Frances Richard was born in Falling Springs, PA on March 29, 1866. After attending National Normal University at Lebanon, OH with a Bachelor of Science degree in 1889, and then a Bachelor of Arts in 1891, Richard received a Master of Arts degree in 1893 from Bloomfield Academy of Franklin College. It was in 1902, when she accepted a position at Miami University as an instructor in English. This was a moment that would not only change her life, but all faculty members and prospective students’ lives as well. From the years 1907–1936, Frances served as associate professor for the School of Education. Throughout those years, Richard proved herself as a talented and inspiring writer at Miami University. In March 1909, she was the author of the monograph, English for the Grades, which was published in the Miami Teacher's Bulletin. She is also recognized for her libretto for Act III of The Emperor's Clothes, published in 1928. Those who knew and worked with Ms. Richard expressed her well-cultivated personality with characteristics such as her able intellect, ability to deal with facts, quiet in manner and her sense of humor. Frances was known to have a great ability and passion for public speaking in Southern Ohio. Frances was eighty-six years old when she died at Hamot Hospital in Erie, PA on April 1, 1952, after celebrating her birthday two days before. After leaving a phenomenal mark at Miami University, a conference was held in her honor, including sixty-three fellow faculty members who urged to have the building be named after her. Frances Richard taught the “art of living” and was one of the ablest and inspiring teachers in the University. On December 6, 1952, South Hall was renamed Richard Hall, and it will forever honor the inspiring and intelligent professor that devoted her abilities to the University.

== Building record ==
Located on 501 South Oak Street, Oxford Ohio, this building houses numerous sorority girls and has various sorority suites within it, such as Alpha Delta Pi, Alpha Omicron Pi, Alpha Phi, Alpha Xi Delta, Delta Gamma, Delta Zeta and Phi Mu. It was the largest women's residence hall until the completion of Scott Hall in 1957. The north unit of the establishment was built in 1940 and cost $220,000. In 1952, the south wing was added for $727,000 and was named after Frances Gibson Richard. The building is used for residence and housing for Sorority ladies, as well as dining for any students. The entire building cost a total of $946,800. The building was made to hold 187 residence students, 280 dining facilities and 100 rooms. The square footage consists of 91,400 ft and a cubic footage of 991,720.
