= Medieval Archaeology =

Journal

- Discipline: Archaeology
- Language: English
- Edited by: Aleks McClain

Publication details
- History: 1957–present
- Publisher: Taylor & Francis on behalf of the Society for Medieval Archaeology (United Kingdom)
- Frequency: Annual
- Open access: Hybrid

Standard abbreviations
- ISO 4: Mediev. Archaeol.

Indexing
- ISSN: 0076-6097 (print); 1745-817X (web)
- LCCN: 61037482
- OCLC no.: 478949447

Links
- Journal homepage; Online access

Medieval Archaeology is a biannual peer-reviewed academic journal covering the archaeology of the medieval period, especially in the United Kingdom and Ireland. It was established in 1957 by the Society for Medieval Archaeology and is published on their behalf by Taylor & Francis. The editor-in-chief is Duncan Wright (Newcastle University).

== History ==
In the mid-20th century, archaeology in Britain was dominated by interests in prehistory and the classical period. The Society for Medieval Archaeology was founded in the 1950s to share information about medieval archaeology, and to publish a journal similar to the Proceedings of the Prehistoric Society. The cost of producing the journal meant that external grants were needed early on, supplementing the society's membership fees. As a result, excavation reports were common especially in early volumes of the journal. Medieval Archaeology inspired the creation of other similarly themed academic journals, Archéologie mediévale (French), Zeitschrift für Archäologie des Mittelalters (German), and Archeologia Medievale (Italian).

To mark the Society for Medieval Archaeology's 50th anniversary in 2006, the first 50 volumes of Medieval Archaeology were made available online via the Archaeology Data Service and are free to access. In 2007, Medieval Archaeology began including abstracts translated into French, German, and Italian.

== Editor's Award ==
Since 2007, the Society has given the Editor's Award (formerly the Martyn Jope Award) to "the best novel interpretation, application of analytical method or presentation of new findings published in its journal".

- 2007: Stuart Brookes, "Boat-rivets in Graves in pre-Viking Kent: Reassessing Anglo-Saxon Boat-burial Traditions"
- 2008: Roberta Gilchrist, "Magic for the Dead? The Archaeology of Magic in Later Medieval Burials"
- 2009: Tomás Ó Carragáin, "The Architectural Setting of the Mass in Early-medieval Ireland"
- 2010: Christopher Knüsel, Catherine M. Batt, Gordon Cook, Janet Montgomery, Gundula Müldner, Alan R. Ogden, Carol Palmer, Ben Stern, John Todd, and Andrew S Wilson, "The Identity of the St Bees Lady, Cumbria: An Osteobiographical Approach"
- 2011: Naomi Sykes and Ruth F. Carden, "Were Fallow Deer Spotted (OE *pohha/*pocca) in Anglo-Saxon England? Reviewing the Evidence for Dama dama damain Early Medieval Europe"
- 2012: Annemarieke Willemsen, "'Man is a sack of muck girded with silver': Metal Decoration on Late-medieval Leather Belts and Purses from the Netherlands"
- 2013: Adrián Maldonado, "Burial in Early Medieval Scotland: New Questions"
- 2014: Charlotte Behr and Tim Pestell, "The Bracteate Hoard from Binham — An Early Anglo-Saxon Central Place?"
- 2015: Lindsey Stirling and Karen Milek, "Woven Cultures: New Insights into Pictish and Viking Culture Contact Using the Implements of Textile Production"
- 2016: Mary Lewis, "Work and the Adolescent in Medieval England AD 900–1550: The Osteological Evidence"
- 2017: Patricia Murrieta-Flores and Howard Williams, "Placing the Pillar of Eliseg: Movement, Visibility and Memory in the Early Medieval Landscape"
- 2018: Aina Heen-Pettersen and Griffin Murray, "An Insular Reliquary from Melhus: The Significance of Insular Ecclesiastical Material in Early Viking-Age Norway"
- 2019: Cecilia Ljung, "Early Christian Grave Monuments and Ecclesiastical Developments in 11th-Century Sweden"
- 2020: Patrick Gleeson, "Archaeology and Myth in Early Medieval Europe: Making the Gods of Early Ireland"

== Publication history ==
In 1963, a double volume issue was printed as a printer's strike the previous year meant there had been no journal. Until 2015 the journal was published by Maney Publishing, which was acquired by Taylor & Francis who then took over production.

== Abstracting and indexing ==
The journal is abstracted and indexed in:

- Academic Search Complete
- Arts & Humanities Citation Index
- British Humanities Index
- Current Contents/Arts & Humanities
- MLA International Bibliography
- Scopus
