= Richard Seymour Hall =

British journalist and historian (1925–1997)

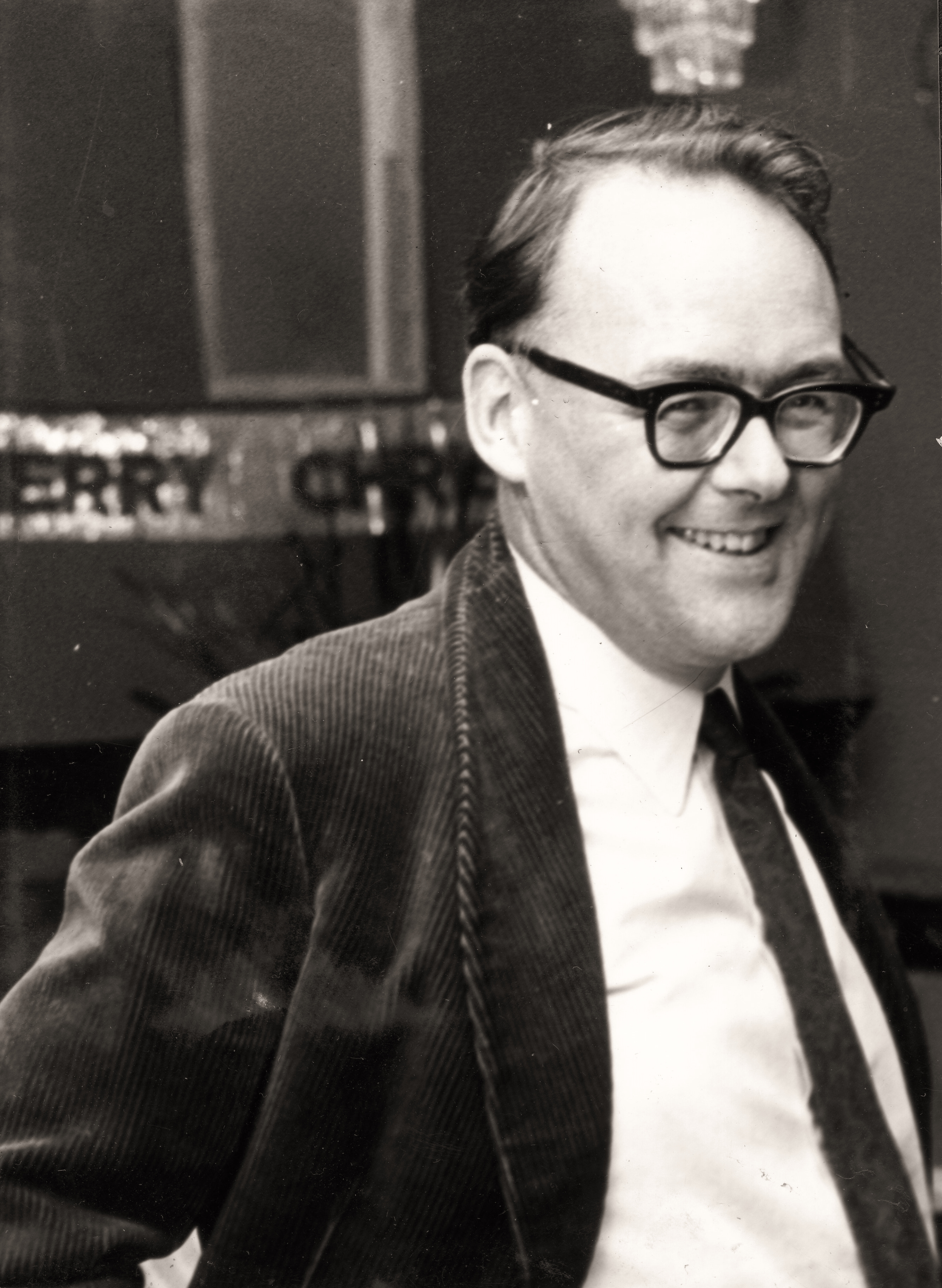
- Hall c. 1960 (from family album)
- Born: 22 July 1922; Margate, England
- Died: 14 November 1997 (aged 75)
- Education: Keble College, Oxford
- Occupations: Journalist and historian
- Spouse(s): Barbara Hall; Carol Cattley
- Website: richardhall.info

Richard Seymour Hall (22 July 1925 – 14 November 1997) was a British journalist and historian, writing primarily about Africa.

== Early life and education ==
He was born in Margate, and spent several years of his childhood in Australia. On returning to the UK with his mother after his parents separated, Hall attended Hastings Grammar School. After a short period working as a junior reporter on local newspapers, he enlisted and served as a signaller in the Royal Navy. After World War 2, he obtained a place at the University of Oxford and received an honours degree from Keble College. During this time, he married Barbara Hall.

== Career ==
As recorded in his obituary, written by Laurence Cockcroft, that appeared in The Guardian newspaper on 19 November 1997, Hall worked first on Fleet Street for the Daily Mail, and then went to Northern Rhodesia, where he was co-founder and editor of the Central African Mail (also known as the African Mail) with Alexander Scott and David Astor.

Throughout the late 1950s and 1960s, Hall remained at the centre of the de-colonisation process in Zambia, with friendships that included Kenneth Kaunda, who became first president of Zambia. Following Zambia's independence and the nationalisation of the African Mail in 1964, he became editor of the Northern Rhodesia Times and promptly renamed it the Times of Zambia a newspaper owned by Tiny Rowland.

In 1967, Hall returned to England as African correspondent for The Observer, including reporting on the Biafran war. Between 1970 and 1973 he was editor of the Observer Magazine. Though taking time out to write a number of books about African history (and its European explorers) Hall remained connected with The Observer for another 10 years. During that time, he was a proponent of ultimately unsuccessful fights for greater journalistic independence from its various owners.

Following the controversial purchase of the Observer in the early 1980s, Hall initially sided with the new owner, Tiny Rowland. This, and later concerns about Rowland using the paper for his own interests in reporting about Africa, brought to a head a simmering conflict with long running Observer editor, Donald Trelford, among others. Following the release of Hall's 1987 book My Life with Tiny, Trelford wrote disparagingly about Hall in The Spectator .

During the early to mid-1980s, Hall also worked as the "men and matters" columnist for the Financial Times and continued to research and write books about Africa.

In 1986, he founded his own financial and political bulletin Africa Analysis. Hall remained active both as editor of Africa Analysis and as an author until his death in 1997.

== Personal life ==
He married twice, first to Barbara Hall MBE, a journalist, author, and crossword compiler and puzzles editor for the Sunday Times. Richard Hall's second marriage was to Carol Cattley, whom he met while working at the Observer. Hall had five sons from his first marriage.

== Books ==
Hall wrote a number of books on African politics, history, and biography, for adults and children.

=== For adults ===
- Empires of the Monsoon: A History of the Indian Ocean and its Invaders, HarperCollins, 1998. ISBN 0006380832
  - Chinese translation: 季风帝国 印度洋及其入侵者的历史, Gingko (Beijing) Ltd, 2018. ISBN 978-7-201-14341-5
- My Life with Tiny: A Biography of Tiny Rowland, London: Faber and Faber, 1987. ISBN 0571147372
- Lovers on the Nile: The Incredible African Journeys of Sam and Florence Baker, Random House, 1980. ISBN 0394502272
  - Spanish translation, Los Amantes del Nilo
- (with Hugh Peyman) The Great Uhuru Railway: China's Showpiece in Africa, London: Gollancz, 1976. ISBN 057502089X
- Zambia 1890–1964: The Colonial Period, 1976. ISBN 0582646200
- Stanley: An Adventurer Explored, Houghton Mifflin, 1975. ISBN 0395194261. According to WorldCat, the book is held in more than 1000 libraries
  - Japanese translation by Kiyotaka Yoneda, 栄光と幻想 : 探検家スタンレー伝 / Eikō to gensō, OCLC 672634044
- The High Price of Principles: Kaunda and the White South, 1969, Holmes & Meier. ISBN 0841900388
- Zambia, Praeger, 1966, 357 pages, OCLC 420544

=== For young people ===
- Explorers in Africa. Usborne Publishing, 1975, ISBN 0860200132
- Discovery of Africa, Hamlyn, 1970, ISBN 060000130X
  - Also published in French as Decouverte de l'afrique
- Kaunda, founder of Zambia. Longmans, 1967.
