= Society for Medieval Archaeology =

British organisation for the study of medieval archaeology, established in 1957

The Society for Medieval Archaeology was founded in 1957. Its purpose is to publish a journal on medieval archaeology and organise conferences and events around the subject. It was the third archaeological society founded with a focus on a particular period, after the Prehistoric Society of East Anglia (1908) and the Society for the Promotion of Roman Studies (1911).

The society's journal is Medieval Archaeology.

The society's logo is a representation of the Anglo-Saxon Alfred Jewel. It was drawn by Eva Sjoegren (wife of David M. Wilson, one of the founders), appeared prominently on the front cover of the journal from 1957 to 2010, and continues to appear on the title page. A meeting of the society's council in 1985 included discussions about establishing a special interest group focused on the study of castles; this became the Castle Studies Group.

== List of presidents ==
- 1986–1989: Charles Thomas
- 2002–2004: Richard Hall
- 2004–2007: Roberta Gilchrist
- 2007–2010: Leslie Webster
- 2014–2016: Helena Hamerow
- 2023–2026: Oliver Creighton
- 2026–present: Sarah Semple
