= Dick Hall (Australian footballer) =

Australian rules footballer

Personal information
- Full name: Richard John Hall
- Born: 20 November 1872; Bedwellty, Monmouthshire, Wales
- Died: 14 December 1906 (aged 34); South Preston, Victoria
- Original team: Collingwood Juniors
- Height: 178 cm (5 ft 10 in)
- Weight: 75 kg (165 lb)

Playing career^{1}
Years	Club	Games (Goals)
1895-6	Collingwood VFA	32 (19)
1897	Collingwood VFL	1 (0)
Total		33 (19)
- ^{1} Playing statistics correct to the end of 1897.

Richard John Hall (20 November 1872 – 14 December 1906) was an Australian rules footballer who played with Collingwood in the Victorian Football League (VFL).

== Family ==
The son of James Hall (1846-1920), and Margaret Hall (1847-1908), née Jarman, Richard John Hall was born at Bedwellty, in Monmouthshire, in Wales on 20 November 1872, and arrived in Australia, at Melbourne, on the S.S. Northumberland, on 23 April 1873.

== Football ==
=== Collingwood (VFA) ===
He played in 32 games for Collingwood in the VFA in 1895 and 1896, and was a follower for the Collingwood team that defeated South Melbourne in the 1896 VFA premiership match, Collingwood's last match in the VFA.

=== Collingwood (VFL) ===
He was the 23rd player to play for Collingwood in its first season of the VFL competition, playing in his single VFL game against South Melbourne, at the Lake Oval, on 29 May 1897.

He was granted a clearance from Collingwood to Albion United in the Victorian Junior Football Association in June 1897.

== Death ==
He died at South Preston, Victoria on 14 December 1906.
