= Richard Hall (archaeologist) =

English archaeologist

- Born: 17 May 1949; Ilford, United Kingdom
- Died: 13 September 2011 (aged 62); York, United Kingdom
- Education: Royal Belfast Academical Institution; Queen's University Belfast; Southampton University
- Known for: Research on Scandinavian York
- Scientific career
- Fields: Archaeology
- Institutions: University of Leeds

Richard Andrew Hall (17 May 1949 – 13 September 2011) was an English archaeologist who specialised in Viking activity in the British Isles.

== Early life and education ==
Richard Andrew Hall was born in Ilford on 17 May 1949. He moved to Belfast at a young age, where he was educated at the Royal Belfast Academical Institution.

Hall received his first degree in archaeology from Queen's University Belfast in 1971 with a dissertation on Viking activity in Ireland. His dissertation was supervised by Peter Addyman. In 1985, Hall received a PhD from the University of Southampton with a dissertation on towns of the English Danelaw.

== Career ==
Hall joined the York Archaeological Trust in 1974 as excavations supervisor. He eventually held the position of director of archaeology and deputy director of the trust. At the same time, Hall was a lecturer in the Department of Continuing Education at the University of Leeds. Hall conducted pioneering research on Scandinavian York and helped create the Jorvik Viking Centre. He also conducted research at the Viking town of Skiringssal (Kaupang), Norway and suggested that the Scandinavian settlers of York might have originated from that town.

Hall was the author of numerous publications on Vikings, on which he was considered an expert. In his writings, he maintained that Vikings were less violent and more advanced than previously believed, and that they have played a significant role in the history of the British Isles.

Hall was a trustee of the Foundation for the Preservation of Archaeological Heritage and on the Council of the Chartered Institute for Archaeologists, the Executive Board of the Council for British Archaeology and the Council of the Society of Antiquaries of London. He was president of the Society for Medieval Archaeology and of the Yorkshire Archaeological and Historical Society, and chairman of the Council of the Institute for Archaeologists from 1987 to 1989.

== Marriages and children ==
Hall's first marriage, to Linda Tollerton, ended in divorce. He married ceramics expert Ailsa Mainman in 1991, and they had two sons.

== Death ==
Hall died in York on 13 September 2011, aged 62.

== Selected works ==
- The Viking Dig, 1984
- Exploring the World of the Vikings, 2007
