= Australian rules football in France =

Australian rules football in France is played in both league and cup based formats. As of the 2017/2018 season there are eight clubs based in Paris (2 teams), Bordeaux, Perpignan, Toulouse, Blagnac, Lyon, and Cergy-Pontoise that compete in the national league. The Commission Nationale de Football Australien (CNFA) is the official governing body for Australian Football in France. In addition to the teams that compete in the national league, there are a number of other teams either in formation or playing in friendly and cup matches, these teams are located in Strasbourg, Bayonne, Montpellier, Lille and Antony. There are four tournaments held annually, the national league known as the French National Championship ("Championnat National") and three cup competitions; the French Cup ("Coupe de France"), North Cup ("Coupe du Nord") and South Cup ("Coupe du Sud").

The French men's national team's highest placing was 2nd at the 2022 AFL Europe Championship, 2nd at the 2013 EU Cup Australian rules football and 10th at the 2017 Australian Football International Cup. Bordeaux hosted the EU Cup in 2013 and 2017.

== History ==
Australian rules football was played by Australian armed forces at Poperinge in 1916, one of the star players was Checker Hughes who served prior to his VFL career. A match was also recorded as being played in Le Havre.

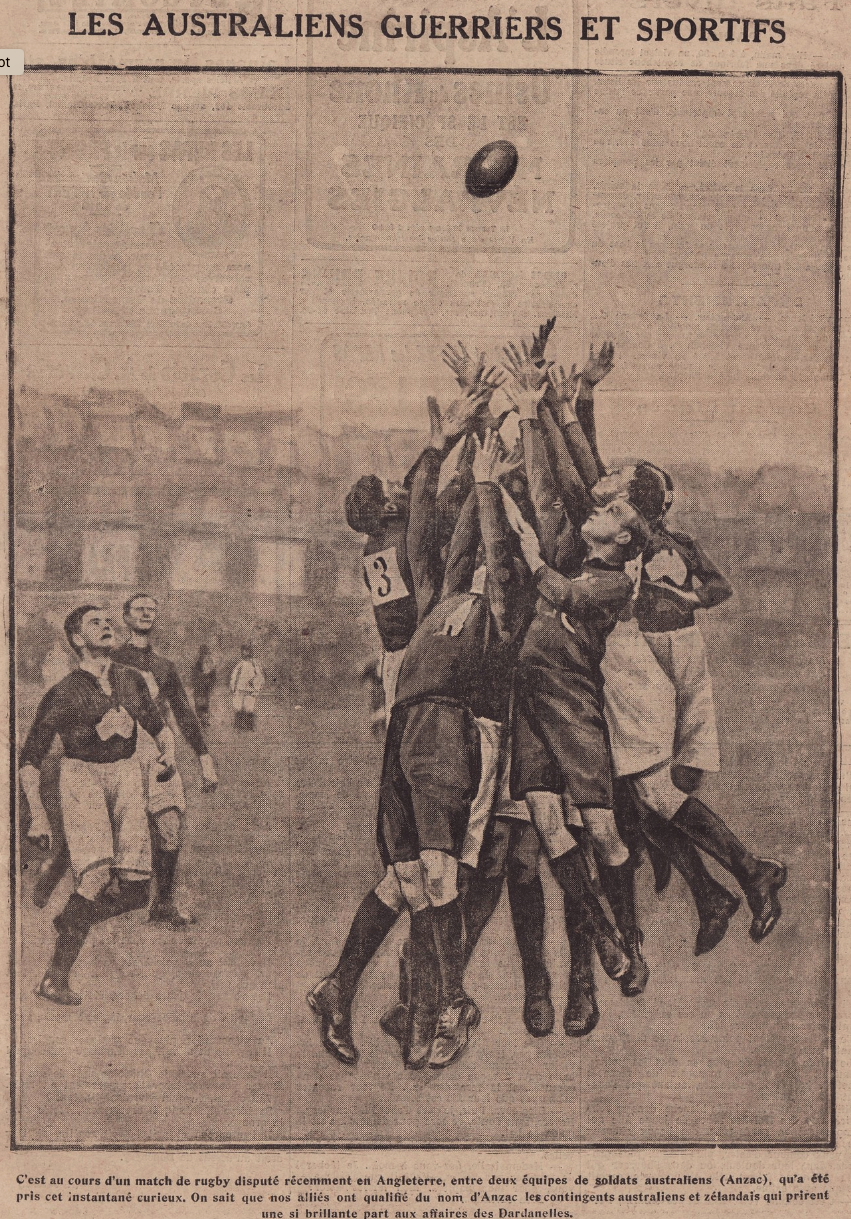
Australian Warriors and Sportsmen. (From Excelsior, 20 November 1916.)

On 20 November 1916 the French newspaper, "The Excelsior", published a version of a photograph that had been taken during the 1916 Pioneer Exhibition Game in London of a large pack of players contesting for a mark, under the title "Les Australiens guerriers et sportifs" ('The Australian Warriors and Sportsmen').

Australian football was first shown in France on Canal+ television in the 1980s. Aussie Rules had been played sporadically in the 1990s by clubs in Paris and Normandy, with the formation of the first club, Houquetot in Normandy. With the support of the Australian embassy, the club became the Montivilliers in 1998 and was nicknamed "Tasmania" in reference to the Australian state. The first game was played against Australians in 1998, but the club disappeared the following year.

it wasn't until 2003-04 when the first stable teams began to appear, the first two being the primarily Australian-expat based Paris Cockerels and the mainly French Strasbourg Kangaroos. The first footy match on record between two 100% French teams was played in Strasbourg on 3 December 2005, with the hometown Kangaroos defeating the Senlis Razorbacks 91–17.

A promotional match was played in March 2006 between English club Reading Kangaroos and a France national side in front of between 500 and 700 spectators in Perpignan, including a sizeable media presence.

Owing to the long distances between clubs, there was no national league as such prior to the inaugural 2009 season. Strasbourg competed in the Australian Football League Germany for 2006, with the Saint Esteve Saints considering joining the Catalan AFL for their 2007 season before going into recess. The first French Cup was held in Paris in 2008, with Paris, Strasbourg, Montpellier and Bordeaux taking part. Further expansion saw the first French National Championship held in 2009 formed by the same 4 teams, and continued growth with the introduction of the Perpignan Tigers and Andorra Crows to the league in 2009/2010 alongside a change to the winter season format with the season generally lasting from October to June with a winter break over Christmas that continues today. Montpellier fell out of the league after the 2009/2010 season and were replaced by the Marseille Dockers. In order to reduce travelling costs and challenges, the league was split into a North and South division and for the first time a final series was held to determine the league champion.

With an aim to increasing the competitiveness of the competition the league format was changed again for the 2011/2012 season with the introduction of a developmental league and a super league. The development league contained Perpignan alongside Montpellier and the re-branded Aix-Marseille Dockers, whilst the Paris Cockerels, Bordeaux Bombers, Toulouse Hawks and Strasbourg Kangaroos competed in the super league. Perpignan left the development league the following season (2012/2013), replaced by the newly formed Cergy-Pontoise Coyotes.

A period of structural change occurred in advance of the 2013/2014 season. Due to lack of numbers the Perpignan Tigers and Aix-Marseille Dockers left the league however the first team from Lyon, the ALFA Lions, were created and entered the league. The league also returned to its original format, with all teams competing against each-other in one league, a structure that continues today.

Currently, the league is experiencing strong growth and can lay claims to being one of the largest competitions in mainland Europe. Growth and participation are strongly focused on local players, given there are few Australian expatriates playing in the league outside of the Paris-based teams. Strong local participation has seen the introduction in 2015 of a second team from the Paris Cockerels club, the Paris Cockatoos, as well as a second team from the Toulouse Hawks in 2016, the Blagnac Aviators. The Brittany Griffons also made their debut in the 2016 Coupe du Nord (North Cup). The French champions have also participated in the European Champions league (a cup competition for the champion teams of each league in Europe) in 2015 and 2016 finishing 4th and 5th in the first two occurrences of the competition. The national team also had the opportunity play an exhibition match in April 2016 at the Stade Velodrome before a Toulon Top 14 rugby union match.

Each year since 2009 a match has been played at Villers-Bretonneux between an Australian and French football side to commemorate ANZAC Day. This event has increased in stature every year with approximately 8,000 people attending the Dawn service at the Australian memorial.

== National team ==
The first French national Aussie Rules team appeared at the 2005 EU Cup in London. In September 2007 the French national Aussie Rules team competed in the 2007 EU Cup in Hamburg, finishing 7th overall with a record of 3 wins from 6 matches and have competed in each following Euro Cup, hosting the competition in Bordeaux in 2013 where they achieved their best finish, 2nd place.

The "Coqs" first participated in the Australian Football International Cup in 2011, finishing second in second division and gaining a creditable 14th place out of 18 participants and gaining plenty of local support. In the 2014 event, the French team improved their performance further by qualifying for division 1, finishing 11th of the 12 division 1 teams, and 11th of 18 overall. At the 2017 cup the French team finished 10th out of 18 teams.

== Current clubs ==
=== Paris Cockerels ===
The Paris Cockerels are the oldest French Australian football club still in activity. Created in 1998 by a community of Australians living in Paris, it is currently composed of French and Australian players. The Cockerels won the first two French Premierships (2009, 2009/2010), as well as three French Cups (2008, 2009, 2011). In 2013, the Paris Cockerels officially launched their women's team: the Cockerelles and in 2015 they won their third Premiership to become the French club with the most titles. Following the success in the 2014/2015 season and high participation rates, a second team, named the Paris Cockatoos, was formed by the club to be introduced into the following season. The Paris Cockatoos went on to win the 2015/2016 premiership, giving the Paris Cockerels football club a total of 4 National Championship flags. The club also won the inaugural Coupe du Nord (North Cup) held in 2016.

=== Antony Blues ===
The Antony Blues were founded in 2017 and made their debut into the French championship during the 2019/2020 season.

=== Strasbourg Kangaroos ===
France's first all-French Australian football club, were founded in Strasbourg in 2003 by Marc Jund with some friends, calling themselves the Kangaroos. The France national team at the 2005 and 2007 EU Cup was composed mainly of Strasbourg players. Strasbourg has grown to now be the biggest Aussie Rules club in France.

In 2006, the club joined the Australian Football League Germany for its 2006 season. This required a name change, as the Munich Club was already nicknamed the Kangaroos - Strasbourg changing its name to the Black Devils. Strasbourg reverted to the Kangaroos name when they withdrew from the AFLG in 2007.

Olivier "Mickey" Lemesle, former co-founder, player, and manager of the team, was crowned EU Cup winner with England Men National Team in 2013.

=== Bordeaux Bombers ===
The Bombers formed in late 2007 and began playing their first matches in 2008. They are the 6th club in France to play Australian Rules Football, they are also the first club in France to have a dedicated home oval. They won the French championship in 2010/2011 and 2011/2012.

=== Montpellier Fire Sharks ===
Formed in 2008, the Montpellier Firesharks made their debut at the French Cup in Paris in June. With a young side, they finished the tournament without a win. Their first victory came against the newly formed Perpignan Tigers in early 2009. They were runners up in the 2014/2015 championship.

=== Toulouse Hawks ===
Formed at the end of 2008 as the "Toulouse Crocodiles" made their debut at the 2009 French Cup in Bordeaux in July. At the end of 2010, they established a partnership with the AFL club Hawthorn Hawks and hence changed their name to the Toulouse Hawks. They won 2 Mediterranean Cups (the predecessor to the Coupe du Sud), and defeated Paris in final of the 2010 French Cup. They finished 2nd in the 2010/2011 National Championship before winning the league in 2012/2013 and 2013/2014. Thanks to high participation rates, Toulouse aims to introduce a second team in the city in 2016, the Blagnac Aviators.

=== Perpignan Tigers ===
Formed at the end 2008, the Perpignan Tigers played their first match again Montpellier in early 2009. They will start play in the Catalan Premiership in March 2009, together with teams from Catalonia and Andorra.

=== Cergy-Pontoise Coyotes ===
2013 saw the return of Australian Football to the Parisian suburbs of Cergy and Pontoise in the North West of Paris. The team competed in their first Grand Final at the end of the 2015/2016 season.

=== Lyon ALFA Lions ===
Lyon's first local footy team, the ALFA Lions (Association Lyonnaise de Football Australien), was founded in mid-2013. They made their début in the 2013/2014 French League by taking the spot of the Aix-Marseille Dockers who were unable to provide a team for the season. The ALFA Lions also competed in the South Cup in Toulouse in February 2014. Their home ground is located at Parc de Parilly in the south-east of Lyon.

=== Blagnac Aviators ===
Based in the suburb of Toulouse of the same name, Blagnac entered the league in the 2016/2017 season.

== Former clubs ==
=== Aix-Marseille Dockers ===
Formed in 2009 as the Marseille Dockers, the team was re-branded to include nearby Aix-en-Provence, the team left the league before the 2013/2014 season due to lack of numbers.

- fr:Marseille Dockers

=== Andorra Crows ===
The Andorran national team, known as the Andorra Crows, competed in the French league during the 2009/2010 season before withdrawing to focus on international competitions.

=== Montivilliers Tasmanians ===
Formed in Normandy, the Montvilliers Tasmanians were one of the earliest Australian football clubs in France.

=== St Estève Saints ===
The Saints formed in Perpignan around 2006, based mainly around Rugby league players. They hosted a match between the Reading Kangaroos and a France national team selection in 2006. The club also formed an organisation called Footy Catalan and considered joining the Catalan AFL, based in southern Catalonia, for the 2007 season, but the club has since gone into recess.

The unrelated Perignan Tigers have since been founded in the city.

== The French Cup ==
=== 2008 ===
In June 2008 teams from Paris, Strasbourg, Bordeaux and Montpellier played in the first national French Cup in Paris. The Paris Cockerels defeated Strasbourg in the final. This competition also served as the national selections for the 2008 EU Cup to be played in Prague in October.

=== 2009 ===
The teams of Paris, Strasbourg, Montpellier, Aix en Provence, Perpignan, Toulouse and Bordeaux came together to contest the Coupe de France on 4 July 2009 in Saint-Medard-en-Jalles near Bordeaux. The Paris Cockerels defeated Perpignan in the final giving the Parisians their second title in as many years.

=== 2010 ===
The teams of Paris, Strasbourg, Montpellier, Toulouse and Bordeaux came together to contest the Coupe de France on 3 July 2010 in Strasbourg. The highly fancied Paris Cockerels were defeated Bordeaux in the final giving the Bombers their first title.

== French players in the Australian Football League ==
The Australian Football League is the premier league for Australian rules football in the world. The following French players have played in the league:

Currently on an AFL senior list

Player	Club/s	AFL Years*	AFL Matches*	AFL Goals*	Connections to France, References
Brant Colledge	West Coast	2013-2016	3	0	Born Strasbourg.
Allan La Fontaine	Melbourne	1934-1945	171	77	Parents
