= Montpellier Fire Sharks =

Names
- Nickname(s): Fire Sharks

Club details
- Founded: 8 April 2008
- Colours: Blue and Orange
- Competition: Union Française de Football Australien
- President: (France) Jerome Canonici
- Coach: (Australia) Jerome Canonici
- Captain(s): Kevin Mc Guinness
- Premierships: 0
- Ground(s): Montpellier

Other information
- Official website: https://www.facebook.com/MontpellierFiresharks

The Fire Sharks of Montpellier are a French Australian Rules Football club based in Montpellier. They're the 7th Australian football club in France, after the Tasmania Montivilliers, Paris Cockerels, Strasbourg Kangourous, Senlis Razorbacks, Saint-Estève Saints and the Bordeaux Bombers. The Fire Sharks are the 4th oldest active club from the Mediterranean Coast in France, seeing that the clubs of Montivilliers, Senlis and Saint-Estève have all since folded. More information :

- fr:Montpellier Fire Sharks
- https://www.facebook.com/MontpellierFiresharks

== History ==
The Australian football club of Montpellier was founded in April 2008 by Benjamin Hamon, 2 months after he had discovered the sport on the Internet. The primary goal of the club is very ambitious : to take part in the first Coupe de France of Australian football, which took place at the end of June, 2008 in Paris. However, the very young President (18 years old at the time) succeeded in assembling a team and thus confirming the presence of the Montpellier Fire Sharks at the first French Championship in history. The first Coupe de France was played between the Paris Cockerels, Strasbourg Kangaroos, Bordeaux Bombers and the Montpellier Fire Sharks at stadium Polygon, in the woods of Vincennes, Paris.

August 2014, a player from Montpellier (Jerome Canonici) integrates the France team that will participate in the International Cup 2014 in Melbourne, Australia. Competition which takes place every 3 years, organized by the Professional Australian League (Australian Football League)

October 2014, three players Firesharks Hérault Montpellier (Jeremy Sardin, Gregoire Chatel, Jerome Canonici) integrate the national team participating in London, the Euro cup 2014.
