= Paris Cockerels =

French-Australian football club

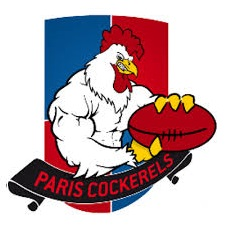
- Nicknames: The Cockerels, The Cocks, The Mighty Paris Cocks
- Sport: Australian Rules Football
- Founded: 1998
- League: Championnat de France de Football Australien
- Based in: Paris, France
- Stadium: Stade du Polygone, Vincennes
- Colours: Blue, White & Red
- Chairman: (France) Bérengère Portal
- Head coach: (Australia) Mike Cowan (Cockerels) (Australia) Steve Trollope (Cockatoos)
- Captain: (France) Pierre Boscart (Cockerels) (France) Clement Bouchet (Cockatoos)
- Championships: 3 - Cockerels 1 - Cockatoos
- Website: www.pariscockerels.fr

The Paris Cockerels are the oldest French Australian football club still in activity. Created by a community of Australians living in Paris, it is mainly composed of French and Australian players. They were responsible for the organization of the first 'Coupe de France' of Australian football, on 28 June 2008.

== Club history ==
=== 1998-2005: the origins ===
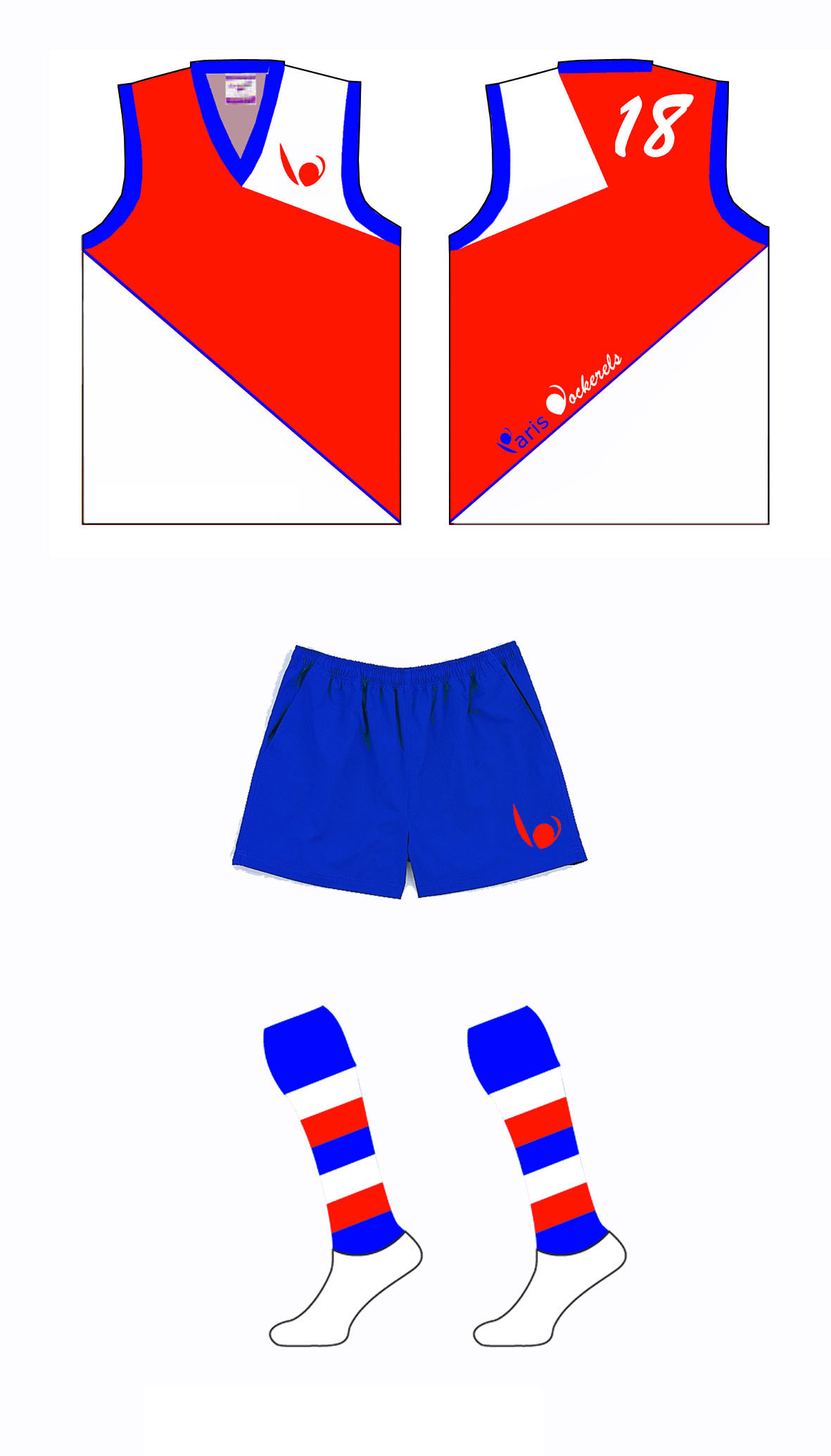
Former Paris Cockerels match kit (2008-2013)

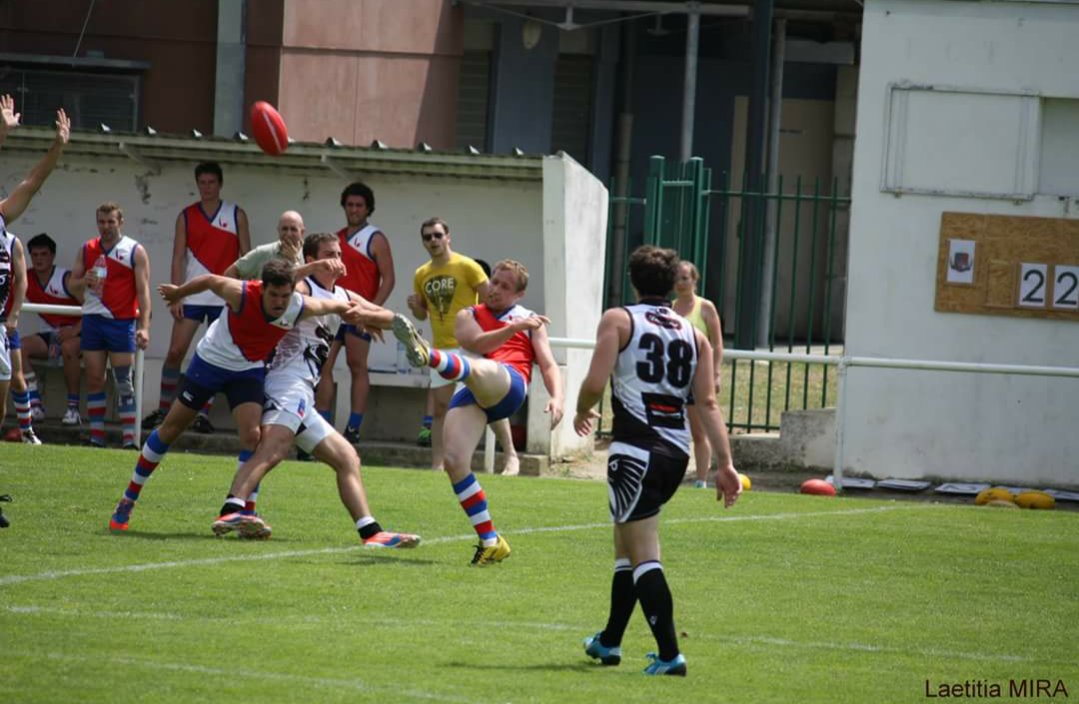
Steven Ryan of the Paris Cockerels performs a clearance kick during the 2013-2014 Grand Final vs. the Toulouse Hawks

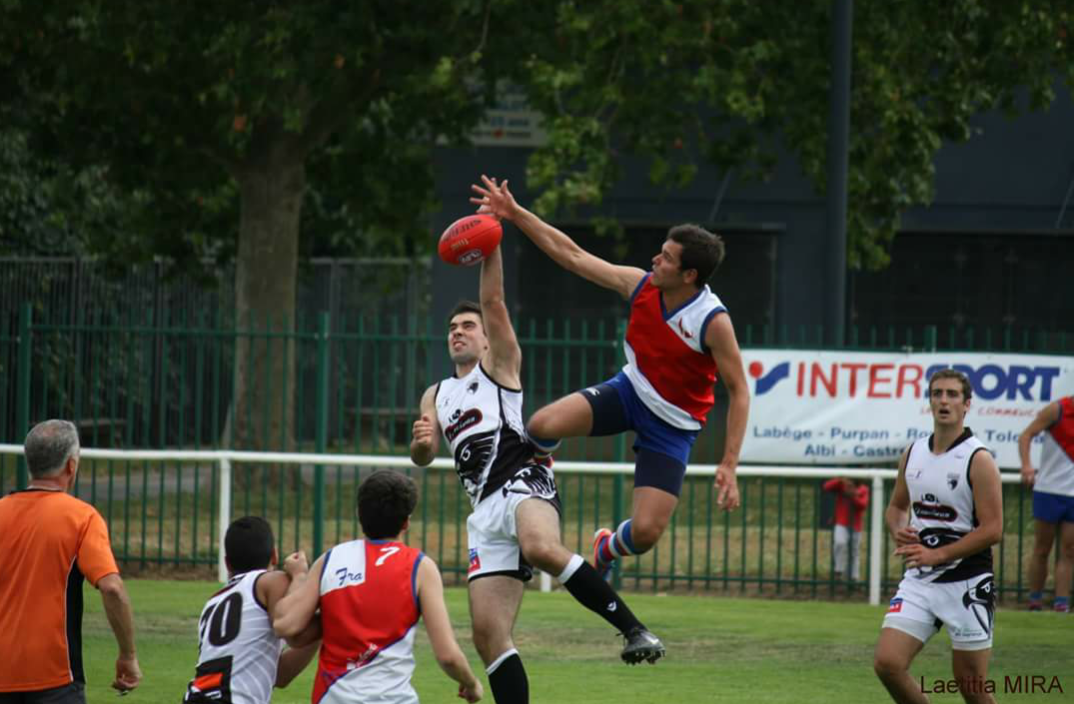
Baudouin Germond of the Paris Cockerels contests the ball in the air during the 2013-2014 Grand Final vs. the Toulouse Hawks

The club was founded in 1998 with the help of James Blanchard of the embassy of Australia in Paris, who at the time was responsible for sports at the embassy. Back then, the club was only made up from expatriate Australians living in France. It was also at this time that the first 100% French team was created, the Tasmania Montivilliers, in Normandie. The two teams thus benefited from the organisation of the first Australian football game on the French territory since the First World War. The score has since been forgotten, but it is more than probable that the Parisian club won due to the experience of their Australian players. Unfortunately this encounter will never be repeated as the Normands would fold the following year.

There would be a long wait before the Cockerels would be able to return in 2004 to the European footy scene. That year would see two confrontations organised against the Brussels Saints, the first one taking place in Brussels and the second one in château de Thoiry.

The summer of 2005 saw the arrival of the first French players for the Cockerels. They did not have to wait long to take part in their first match, as on 5 September 2005, a very young team from Strasbourg arrived in Paris for their first match. Once again, thanks to the experience of the Australian players, the Parisians were able to win the match easily (75 to 37). From this match two players were selected to travel to London to represent France for the first European Cup in October 2005. Some month after this event, the club was officially formed, under the name of the Paris Cockerels and chaired by a Frenchman, Olivier Tresca.

=== The difficult years, 2006-2007 ===
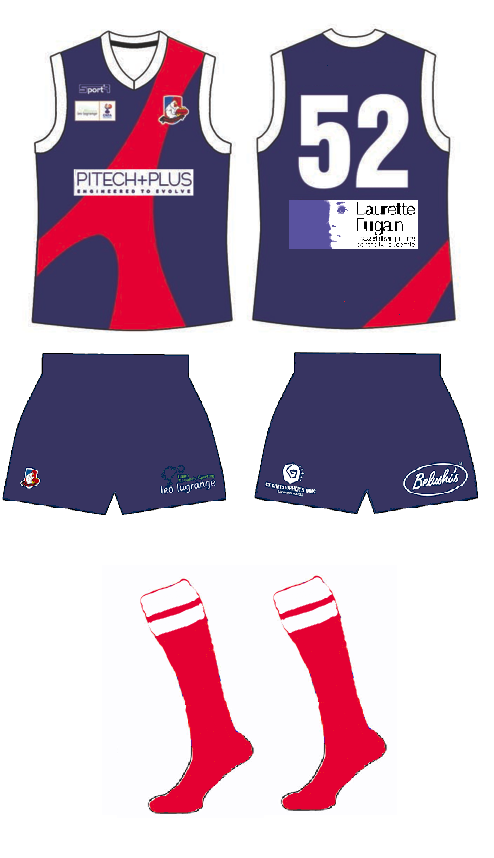
Current Paris Cockerels match kit, easily recognizable with its Eiffel tower shaped sash

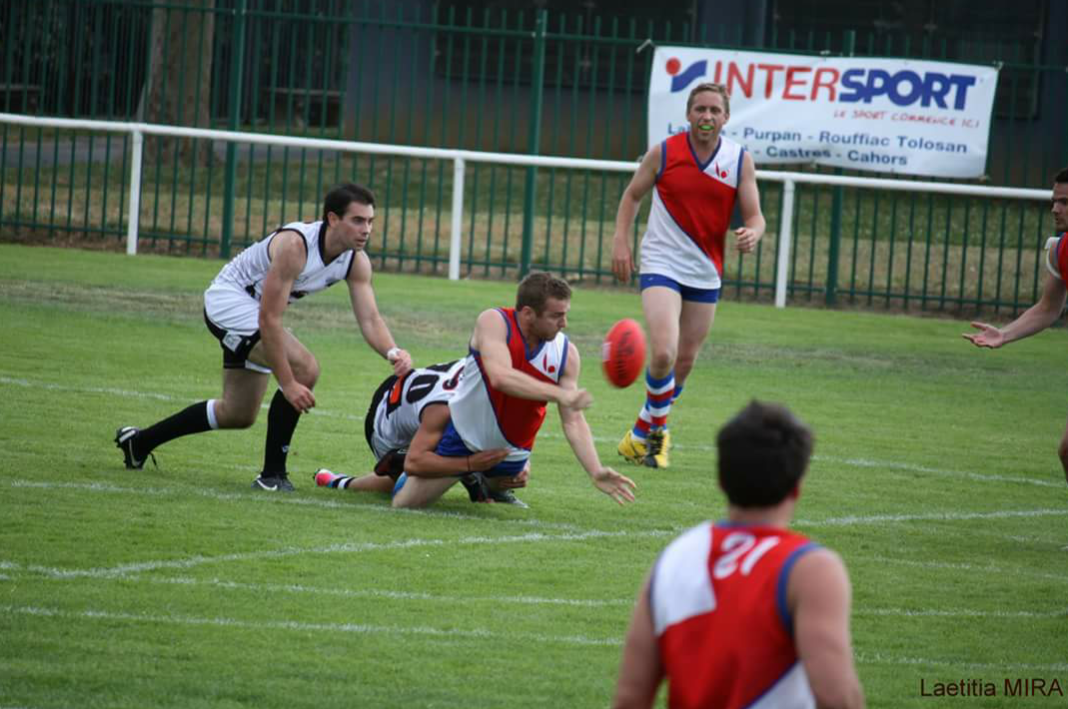
Julien Dagois of the Paris Cockerels handballs under pressure during the 2013-2014 Grand Final vs. the Toulouse Hawks

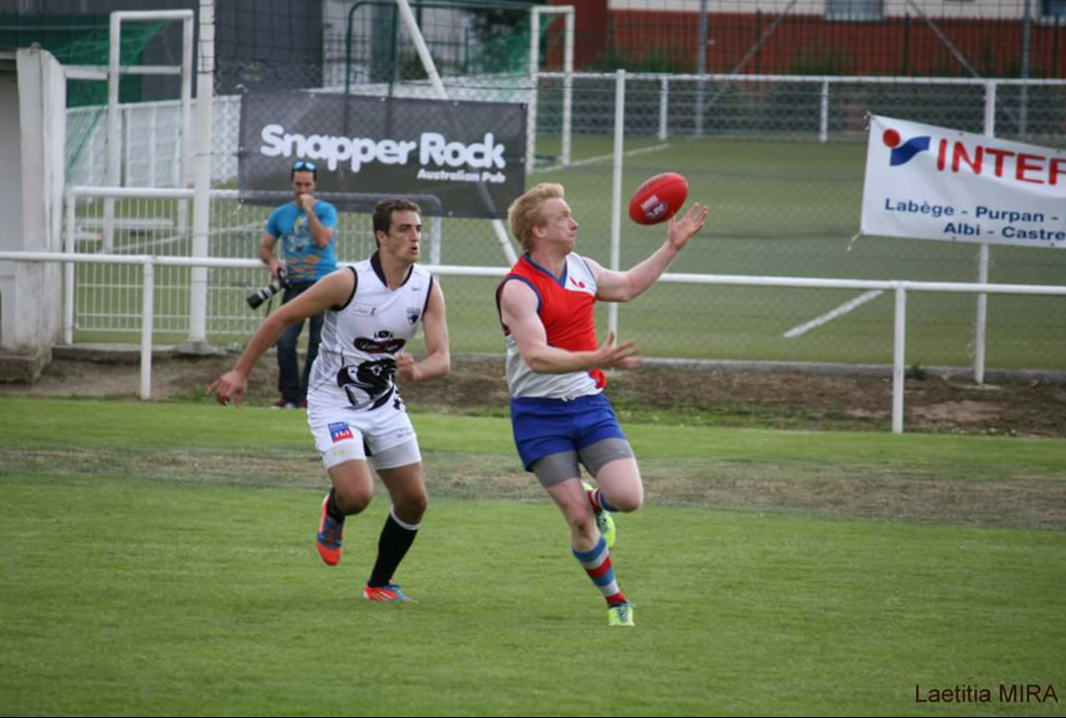
Garrath Holdstock of the Paris Cockerels gains possession of the ball during the 2013-2014 Grand Final vs. the Toulouse Hawks

After 2005 the Parisian club ran into somewhat of a bad patch. The majority of the Australians left France, and there was not a lot of time and effort invested into the club. Very few new players were recruited, and only two or three players were turning up to the trainings. In fact French footy in general was in a difficult period, with problems of recruitment and a series of heavy defeats at the German championship for the club of Strasbourg. Despite everything the club resisted and waited for better days. At the same time, the club tried to organise the 2006 edition of the European Championship of Australian football, but due to many unforeseen force the organisers were forced to cancel the event.

=== 2008-2013: rebirth of the club and first successes ===
In February 2008 the rebirth of the team begins with the arrival of Cyril Talon. His arrival corresponds to the revival of footy in France with the creation of the Bordeaux Bombers (in October) and the Montpellier Fire Sharks a few months later. In spring the club sees a wave of recruitment and for the first time in the club's history they play in their official colours.

After many unfruitful attempts, the Parisian are finally able to play a match and it is on this occasion the Strasbourg Kangaroos were able to take their revenge. On 31 May 2008, the Parisian set out for Strasbourg in spite of the absence of some of their key players. The Alsatian are able to inflict a severe defeat to the Parisians with 94–45 in a match that was eventually stopped by a violent storm.

With the creation of Bordeaux and Montpellier, the leaders of French Australian Football decided to organise the first Coupe de France of Australian football, held in Paris on 28 June 2008.

In addition to the tournament, the organisers had arranged the demonstrations of the boomerang and the sales of Vegemite. In spite of a hard ground, and the multiple injuries (especially among the Parisians) the Cockerels downed their rivals of Strasbourg, the score 57–28.

Following on from this victory, the Parisians are ready to receive the Dutchmen for the first match between the teams of Paris and Amsterdam. Deprived of many of their players through injury and also out played technically, the Parisians go down to a painful score of 56–143.

In 2009 the Paris Cockerels entered a new era of success, and looked to stamp themselves as the powerhouse of Australian Rules Football in France. Popular captain Sebastian Sabogal led the Cockerels into 2009, and after a hard pre-season under Coach Graham Andrews they played their first match for 2009, a friendly, against the North London Lions at home. It was the first time the Cockerels had hosted an 18-a-side match and Paris turned on a beautiful day at the Bois de Vincennes. After a hard-fought encounter which saw the Cockerels leading with 10 minutes to play, North London eventually proved too good. The final score was Lions 8.18.66, Paris 6.6.42. On Sunday 29 May the Cockerels assembled in Montpellier to play their opening match for the 2009 French cup, against the Montpellier Firesharks. The match was a good contest played in good spirits, and was Palli Finnssons first match as captain in the absence of Sabogal. The Cockerels were full of confidence after their good from against North London, and took that form into the 9 player form of the game, establishing a 7-goal lead by quarter time. Despite some rough play from the firesharks, Paris were unfazed and ran away with a 22.13.145 to 11.8.74 victory.

There was one more friendly before the season continued, this time against the Flying Dutchmen in Amsterdam. After many of the Cockerels players apparently stayed out until 6am in Amsterdam the night before the match, they lost the toss and kicked into a stiff breeze in the opening term. Consequently, Amsterdam kicked the first seven goals, and were never troubled, eventually winning 15.16.106 to 8.9.57. The match would ultimately be Sabogal's swan song, and the team celebrated hard into the following Saturday night.

After an easy victory against the Bordeaux Bombers in Paris, the Cockerels travelled to Strasbourg for what was effectively a playoff for the championship with both teams standing undefeated. In a slightly controversial result, Joey Maclean (playing in his one and only French Championship match) kicked 9 goals as the Cockerels rallied from a half time deficit to eventually win 103 - 61 and secure the first ever French Championship. The Cockerels also took out the French cup in Bordeaux.

Another French Premiership in 2009-2010 and two consecutive runners-up spots the following years, alongside a Coupe de France victory in 2011 cemented the cocks position as one of the powerhouses in French Aussie Rules football.

=== 2013-2014: a new era begins ===
The 2013–2014 season is the beginning of a new cycle for the Paris Cockerels, with the renewal of most of the players. This new recruits wave is composed of both Aussie and French players, bringing a fresh spirit to the club.

Although the Cocks began the season with a single-point loss to the neighbours of Cergy-Pontoise, they enjoyed a winning streak next with wins at Bordeaux and Lyon and at home versus Strasbourg and Montpellier. The only setback in the meantime being a tough defeat given by the Hawks in Toulouse, the Cockerels made it to the finals. In the preliminary final, they headed back to Bordeaux where they snatched a tight overtime victory, which marked the first overtime game in French Aussie Rules football history. In the Grand Final, the Paris Cockerels suffered another loss in Toulouse, in a game that saw the Hawks grab their second straight title.

In the same 2013–2014 season, the Cockerels travelled to Glasgow to take part in the Haggis Cup. Suffering an injury in their first game, they had to play all day without any interchange players but almost managed to make it to the podium in the end, falling in the 4th spot.

The Paris Cockerelles, the club women's team was formed the same year. Lacking a few players and opponents in France they could not take part in an official game during their first season. However, new player arriving for the 2014–2015 season strengthened the side and they keep on improving all the time.

=== 2014-2015: back to the top ===
Eager to improve after the previous year disappointing result, the Cockerels got back to work under a new coach Steven Ryan. After remaining undefeated all-season long, the Paris Cockerels hosted the Montpellier Firesharks in the championship Grand Final on 27 June 2015. They finally ended their four-years Championship draught with a convincing win (27.16.178 to 9.8.62) that has been widely recognized as one of the best games in the history of French footy. After the game, Steven Ryan, the Cockerels coach, released the following statement: "It's been called by some as the most devastating display of football ever seen in the national competition. Whatever your opinion, those players can be proud of the brand of football they delivered that day. It can only be good news for French football. Everyone to play in the future will now play catch up to the challenge that this team has laid down."

=== 2015-2016: creation of the Paris Cockatoos ===
Following their Premiership win, the Paris Cockerels were confronted with a new problem, since too many players were part of the team, reducing dramatically the opportunities to take part into official games.

The solution was found with the creation of a second team: the Paris Cockatoos. At the Cockatoos creation, their ranks have been filled with Cockerels, the original team being split into two balanced sides, giving everyone the opportunity to fulfill their potential. Both teams are still training together but they are competing separately in the French Premiership.

The season 2015-2016 saw the first Paris derby, which was won by the newly founded Cockatoos (8.14.62 to 10.11.71) on 31 October 2015. On 25 June 2016, the Paris Cockatoos clinched the 2015/2016 National Championship defeating the Cergy-Pontoise Coyotes in the Grand Final in Bordeaux.

=== 2016-2017: Footy in Jean Bouin ===
With a title to defend, the Cockatoos, after a disappointing start, managed to reach again the Grand Final against Lyon, who eliminated the Cockerels in a huge semi-final. Played in Stade Jean-Bouin 30 April after the parisian Top14 Rugby derby, The Cockatoos drown their hope of a back to back, losing 104 - 41.

== Trophies and results ==
=== French National Championship ===
Season	Rank	Winner
2008-2009	Champions	Paris Cockerels
2009-2010	Champions	Paris Cockerels
2010-2011	Runners-up	Bordeaux Bombers
2011-2012	Runners-up	Bordeaux Bombers
2012-2013	Runners-up	Toulouse Hawks
2013-2014	Runners-up	Toulouse Hawks
2014-2015	Champions	Paris Cockerels
2015-2016	Champions	Paris Cockatoos
2016-2017	Runners-Up	Lyon

=== French Cup ===
Year	Rank
2008	Champions
2009	Champions
2010	Runners-up
2011	Champions
2012	Runners-up
2013	Runners-up
2014	Runners-up
2017	Runners-up

=== Paris International Rules Cup ===
==== 2008-2009 ====
Club	G	O	B	S	Club	G	O	B	S	Date
Paris Cockerels	0	3	5	17	Paris Gaels	3	13	2	84	24 November 2008
Paris Cockerels	?	?	?	24	Paris Gaels	?	?	?	70	15 December 2008
Paris Cockerels	2	8	11	47	Paris Gaels	3	15	20	83	26 January 2009
Paris Cockerels	6	2	12	54	Paris Gaels	2	5	10	43	15 March 2009

Legend : G : Number of goals, O : Number of overs,B : Number of behinds, S : Final Score

=== Friendly matches ===
==== 1998-2009 ====
Club	G	B	S	Club	G	B	S	Date and place
(France) Paris Cockerels	?	?	?	(France) Tasmania Montivilliers	?	?	?	around 1998, supposed Parisian victory
(Belgium) Brussels Saints	?	?	78	(France) Paris Cockerels	?	?	61	25 May 2004 in Bruxelles
(France) Paris Cockerels	?	?	?	(Belgium) Brussels Saints	?	?	?	summer of 2004, Château de Thoiry, Belgian victory
(France) Paris Cockerels	?	?	75	(France) Strasbourg Kangaroos	?	?	37	5 September 2005 in Paris
(France) Strasbourg Kangaroos	14	10	94	(France) Paris Cockerels	6	9	45	31 May 2008 in Strasbourg
(France) Paris Cockerels	8	8	56	(Netherlands) Amsterdam	20	23	143	12 July 2008 in Paris
(France) Paris Cockerels	6	6	42	(England) North London Lions	8	18	66	21 March 2009 in Paris
(France) Paris Cockerels	?	?	?	(Netherlands) Flying Dutchmen	?	?	?	4 April 2009 in Amsterdam
(France) Paris Cockerels	?	?	?	(Netherlands) Flying Dutchmen	?	?	?	5 September 2009 in Paris

Legend : G : Number of goals, B : Number of behinds, S : Final Score

== Team ==
=== Current roster ===
==== Paris Cockerels 2017-2018 ====
Surname	First Name	Country	Position	Number
Robert	Nicolas	(France)	Back	51
Rolland	Xavier	(France)	Back	72
Ryan	Huw	(Australia) (France)	Back	4
Ryan	Steven	(Australia)	Back	36
Vieux de Morzadec	Guillaume	(France)	Forward	6
Delmas	Matthieu	(France)	Midfielder	94
Germond	Baudouin	(France)	Ruck/Forward/Back	11
Arnephy	Paul	(Australia)	Forward	35
Boscart	Pierre	(France)	Forward	19
Descours	Etienne	(France)	Forward	12
Ramdani	Amine	(France)	Forward	13
Woods	Cameron	(Australia)	Forward	32
Simpson	Ben	(Australia)	Midfielder	
Cowan	Mike	(Australia)	Midfielder	
Nussbaumer	Franck	(France)	Midfielder	
Dulchain	Alexandre	(France)	Midfielder	91
Erra	Pierre	(France)	Midfielder	
Nadal	Miguel	(Spain)	Forward	
McInerney	Drew	(Australia)	Back	
Rea	Hugo	(France)	Back	
Benoit	Ryan	(Australia)	Midfielder	
Margueritte	Maxime	(France)	Ruck	
Lefebvre	Julien	(France)	Defender	

==== Paris Cockatoos 2017-2018 ====
Surname	First Name	Country	Position	Number
Chauvin	Simon	(France)	Back	42
Dony	Clément	(France)	Back	14
Maupin	Florian	(France)	Forward	
Barbaria	Yvan	(France)	Back	22
Bouchet	Clément	(France)	Midfielder	17
Dagois	Julien	(France)	Midfielder	9
Daniel	François	(France)	Midfielder	
Stanley	Tristan	(Australia) (Germany)	Back/Ruck	7
Unsworth	Andrew	(Australia)	Forward	2
Robson	Karl	(Australia)	Back/Forward	30
Senkans	Andrew	(Australia)	Forward	3
Azemard	Thomas	(France)	Forward	4
Glinec	Simon	(France)	Back	
Trollope	Steven	(Australia)	Midfielder	
Barker	Sean	(Australia)	Forward	
Brookins	Babacar	(France)	Ruck	
Sturge	Gareth	(Wales)	Forward	
	Aurelien	(France)	Forward	
Rosado	Jean	(France)	Ruck	
Long	Conor	(United States)	Forward	

==== Cockerelles team 2017-2018 ====
Name	First Name	Country	Position	Number
Ducquet	Coline	(France) FRA	Back	
Guriah-Mira	Laëtitia	(France) FRA	Back	4
Pille	Anne	(France) FRA	Back	26
Portal	Bérengère	(France) FRA	Back	7
Perez	Claire	(France) FRA	Midfielder	
Jesse	Welton	(Australia) AUS	Midfielder	
Si Haddi	Sabrina	(France) FRA	Midfielder	8
Berger	France	(France) FRA	Forward	31
Thelliez	Elise	(France) FRA	Forward	

== Honour board ==
=== Club Founder ===
- 1998 : (Australia) James Blanchard

=== Club Presidents ===
- 2005 - 2008 : (France) Olivier Tresca
- 2008 - 2010 : (France) Cyril Talon
- 2010 - 2012 : (France) Maureen Bassard
- 2012 - 2014 : (France) Sébastien Artus
- 2014 - 2016 : (France) Bérengère Portal
- 2016 - 2018 : (France) Fanny Maillet
- 2018 - 2020 : (France) Hugo Rea
- 2020 - : (France) Alexandre Dulchain

=== Club Coaches ===
- 2005 - 2008 : (France) Olivier Tresca
- 2008 - 2011 : (Australia) Graham Andrews
- 2011 - 2014 : (Australia) Andrew Senkans
- 2014 - 2016 : (Australia) Steven Ryan
- 2016 - 2017 : (Australia) Mike Cowan
- 2017 - 2019 : (Australia) Mike Cowan (Cockerels) & (Australia) Steven Trollope (Cockatoos)
- 2019 - 2021 : (Australia) Cameron Woods (Cockerels), (Australia) Steven Trollope (Cockatoos) & (Australia) Andrew Morton (Cockerelles)
- 2021 - : (Australia) Cameron Woods (Cockerels), (Australia) Steven Trollope (Cockatoos) & (France) (Australia) Huw Ryan (Cockerelles)

=== Club Captains ===
- 2005 - 2008 : (France) Olivier Tresca
- 2008 - 2009 : (Australia) Sebastian Sabogal
- 2009 - 2011 : (Iceland) Páll Tómas Finnsson
- 2011 - 2013 : (France) François Daniel
- 2013 - 2015 : (France) Maxence Launais
- 2015 - 2021 : (France) Pierre Boscart (Cockerels) & (France) Clément Bouchet (Cockatoos)
- 2021 - : (France) Alexandre Dulchain (Cockerels) & (France) Clément Bouchet (Cockatoos)

=== Notable former players ===
- 2004 : (Australia) Richard McKenzie
- 2005 : (France) Laurent Caravelle
- 2005 : (France) Olivier Tresca
- 2006 : (France) Guillaume Lebrun
- 2006 : (France) Clément Charlet
- 2006 : (Australia) David O'Hanlon
- 2008 : (France) Cyril Talon
- 2008 : (Australia) Graham Andrews
- 2008 : (Iceland) Páll Tómas Finnsson
- 2008 : (France) Denis Schneider
- 2008 : (France) Jérôme Loubet
- 2008 : (France) Bertrand Lejeune
- 2008 : (France) Jules Lecerf
- 2008 : (France) Léo Filipetti
- 2008 : (Australia) Nicholas Andrews
- 2008 : (Australia) Sam Dawkins
- 2008 : (Australia) Sebastian Sabogal
- 2008 : (Australia) Trent Broadway
- 2008 : (Australia) Cameron Miller
- 2008 : (France) Nicolas Campo
- 2009 : (Australia) Joey MacLean
- 2009 : (Australia) Shannon Birchall
- 2009 : (Australia) David Hislop
- 2009 : (Canada) Mike Karas
- 2009 : (France) Amaury Launais
- 2009 : (South Africa) Harold Courchay
- 2009 : (Australia) Subajan Sivandran
- 2009 : (Australia) Adam Sargon
- 2009 : (Australia) Joel Booth
- 2009 : (Australia) Dom Wenden
- 2009 : (France) Sebastien Artus
- 2009 : (France) Jean François Bouron
- 2009 : (Australia) Ivan Price
- 2009 : (France) Jacques Rossard (resumed playing for the club)
- 2009 : (Australia) Edouard Cameron
- 2009 : (Australia) Dan Andrews
- 2010 : (France) Wilfried Houvion
- 2011 : (Australia) Liam Wilson
- 2013 : (Scotland) Angus Mackintosh
- 2013 : (Australia) Garrath Holdstock
- 2013 : (Australia) Tim Milton-Hind
- 2015 : (France) (Italy) Aldwin Bevilacqua
- 2015 : (France) Jérôme Fournier
- 2015 : (France) Julien Aussoleil
- 2015 : (France) Arnaud Bezard
- 2015 : (France) Kevin Taulera
- 2015 : (France) Hugo Basset
- 2015 : (Australia) Hugh Atkin
- 2015 : (Australia) Daniel Stephens
- 2015 : (Australia) Mark Arnephy
- 2015 : (Australia) Jake Calvert
- 2015 : (France) (England) Thomas Hedley
- 2016 : (Australia) Andrew Moore
- 2016 : (France) Maxence Launais
- 2016 : (France) Jules Frossard
- 2016 : (Australia) (Estonia) Stuart Saare
- 2016 : (France) Camille Portal
- 2024 : (Australia) David Harrold
