= Toulouse Hawks =

Football team

The Toulouse Hawks are an Australian rules football team based in Toulouse, France. As of 2018, the team primarily competes in the national competitions in France including the Championnat de France and the French Cup. The team typically wears black and white jumpers.

== History ==
Originally formed in 2008 as the Toulouse Crocodiles, the Toulouse Hawks first competed in the Championnat de France in the 2009/2010 season, finishing 3rd overall. The club would go on to win the league in the 2012/2013 and 2013/2014 seasons as well as the 2010 and 2015 editions of the French Cup. Following the 2015/2016 season, the Blagnac Aviators were formed in Blagnac, France, with a number of players from the Toulouse Hawks moving to play with the new team due to its proximity.

== Results ==
Championnat de France
Season	Wins	Losses	Draws	Points For	Points Against	Final Placing
2009/2010	3	2	0	580	405	3rd
2010/2011	3	1	0	376	197	2nd
2011/2012	3	3	0	513	483	3rd
2012/2013	4	2	0	603	366	1st
2013/2014	6	0	0	774	302	1st
2014/2015	6	1	0	1040	484	3rd
2015/2016	5	2	0	761	373	3rd
2016/2017	1	6	0	410	800	8th
