= Abele (village) =

Coordinates: 50.8222°N 2.669°E

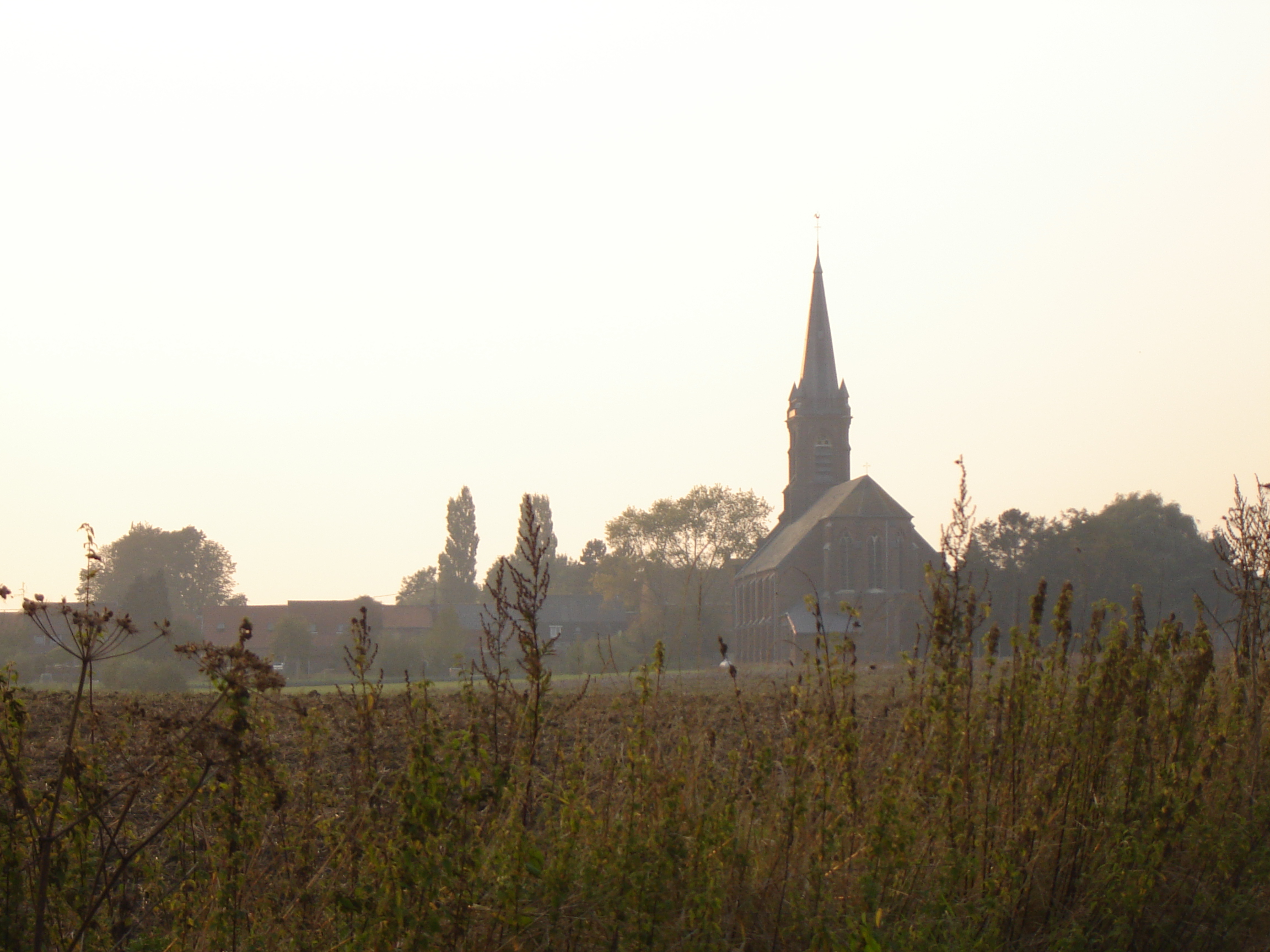
View of Abele

Abele (also spelled Abeele) is a small village or hamlet in the city of Poperinge, in the Belgian province of West Flanders. The village is located on the territory of Poperinge proper and its "deelgemeente" Watou, but is also partly located on French territory. Abele has about 600 inhabitants, of whom about 100 are French. The main street coincides with the border between Belgium and France, so houses located on different sides of the street are located in a different country.

The church of Abele is located on French territory, but the services are organized by the Roman Catholic Diocese of Bruges. The Kerkfabriek of Watou and the local authorities of Boeschepe are responsible for its maintenance.

Abele used to be an import border crossing. In 1713, a tollhouse was set up, but it disappeared during the French Revolution. The old Belgian customs office was renovated and now serves as a retro-café with a small exhibition.

Abeele Aerodrome Military Commonwealth War Graves Commission Cemetery is outside the village, on the site of a World War I military airfield.

== Gallery ==
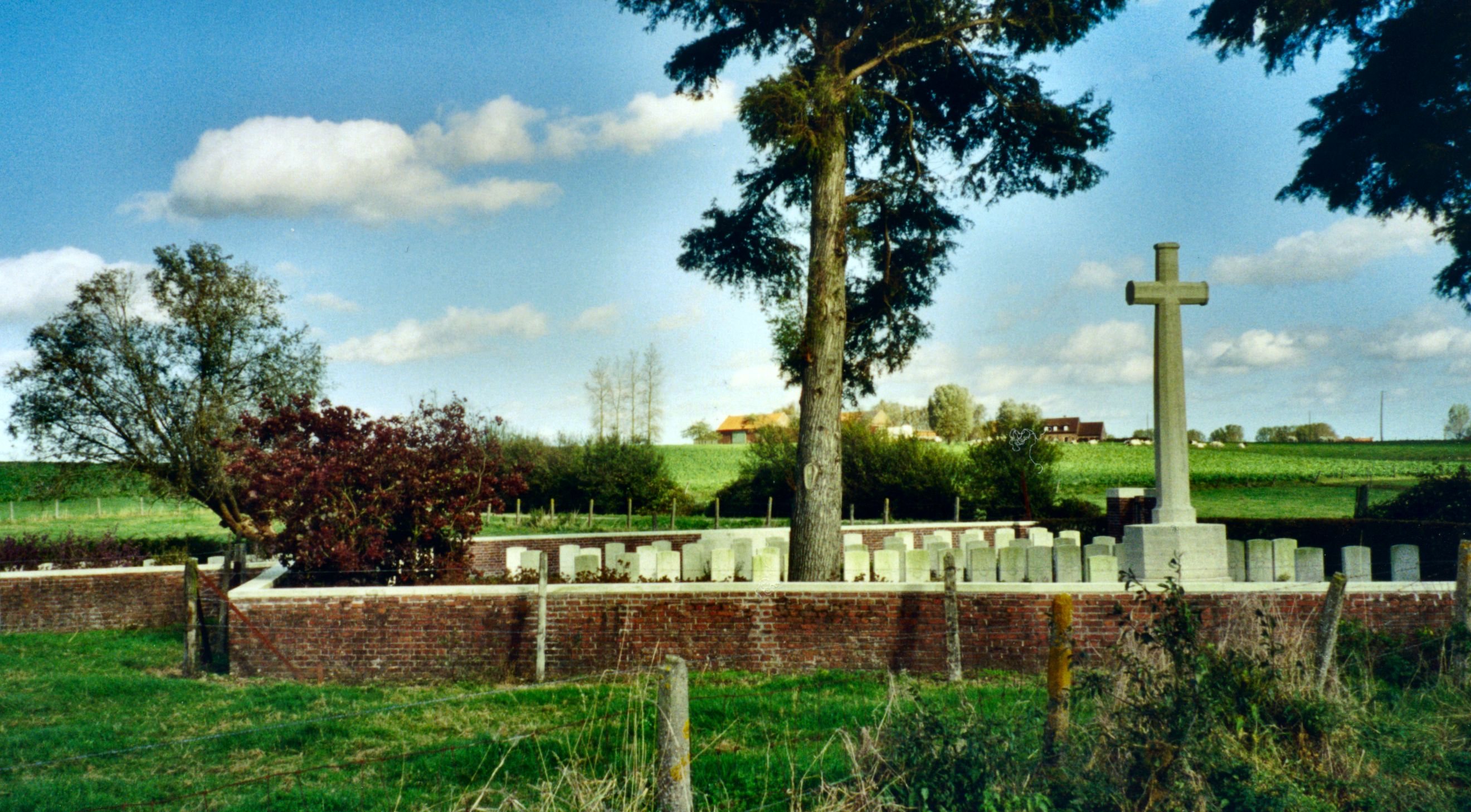
Abeele Aerodrome Military Cemetery

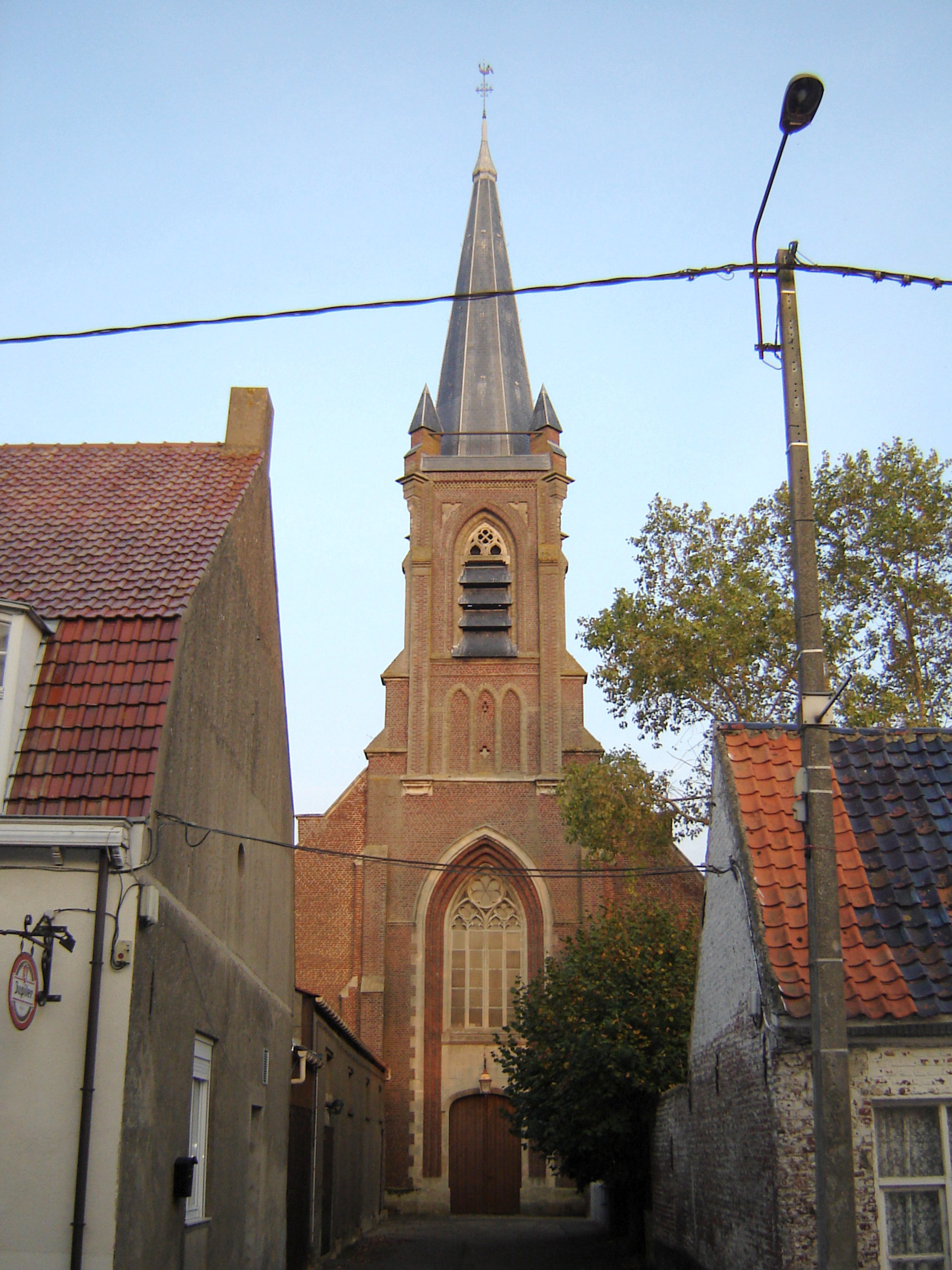
The Immaculate Conception R C church
