= French Open (disambiguation) =

The French Open is a Grand Slam tennis tournament in Paris, France. It may also refer to:

- Individual iterations of the tennis tournament, listed at Category:French Open
- French Open (badminton), a major badminton tournament
  - Individual iterations of this event, listed at Category:French Open (badminton)
- French Open (darts), a major darts tournament
- French Open (chess), an alternative name for the French Defence opening
- Open de France, a European Tour golf tournament

== See also ==
- French Championship (disambiguation)
