= Watou Churchyard =

CWGC cemetery in Belgium

Kerkhof van Watou
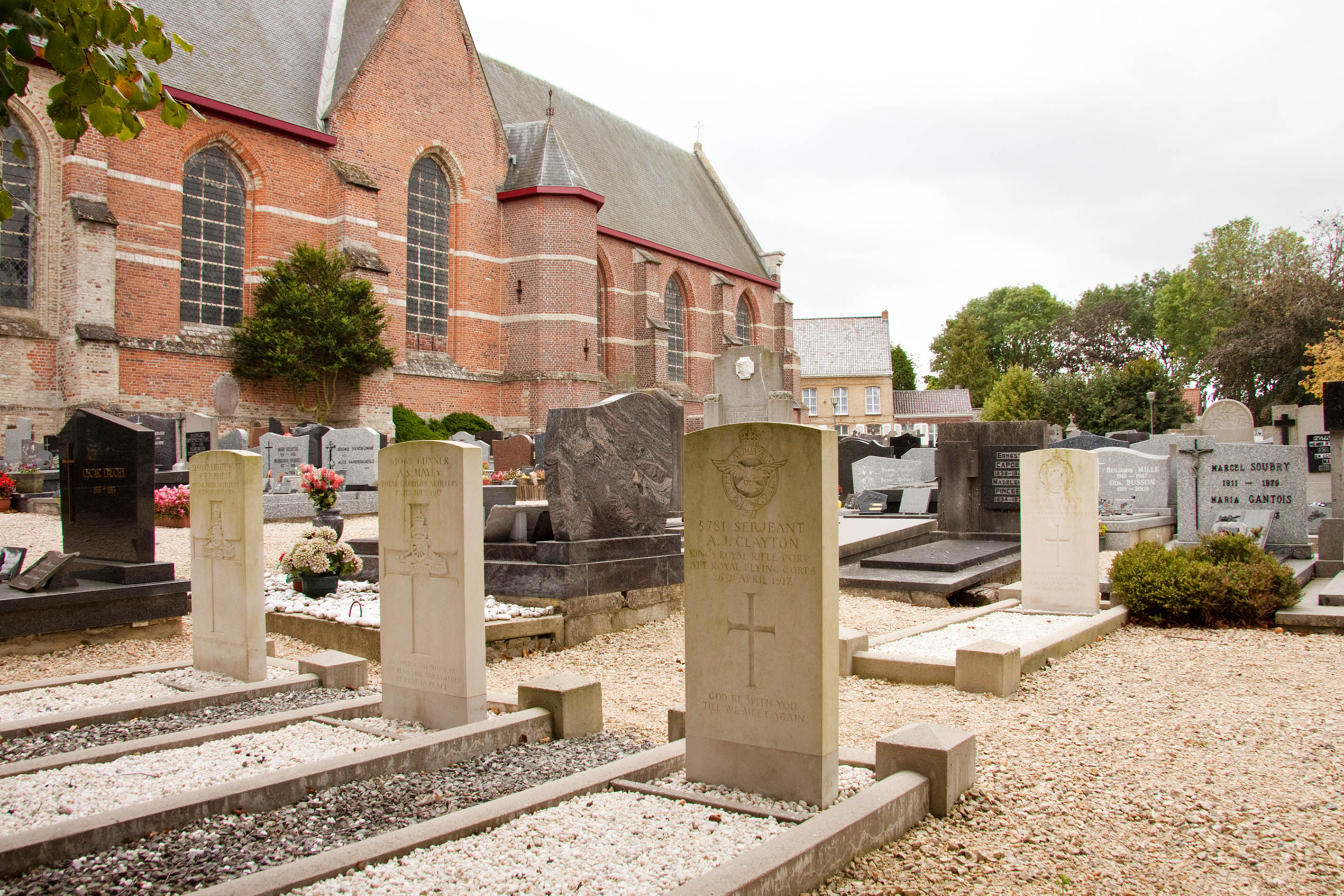
- Interactive map of Kerkhof van Watou

Details
- Location: Sint-Bavokerk, Watou
- Country: Belgium
- Coordinates: 50°51′33.7″N 2°37′11.3″E
- Type: Municipal Church Cemetery
- Owned by: Commonwealth War Graves Commission
- Find a Grave: Kerkhof van Watou

Watou Churchyard (Kerkhof van Watou) is a municipal cemetery in the Belgian village of Watou. The churchyard is adjacent to Sint-Bavokerk

== British War Graves ==
On the north side next to the church there are 12 British war graves commemorating deaths from World War I. There are 11 British and one Canadian that were buried here between April 1915 and April 1918. The graves are maintained by the Commonwealth War Graves Commission. The graveyard is noted in the CWGC Registers as Watou Churchyard.

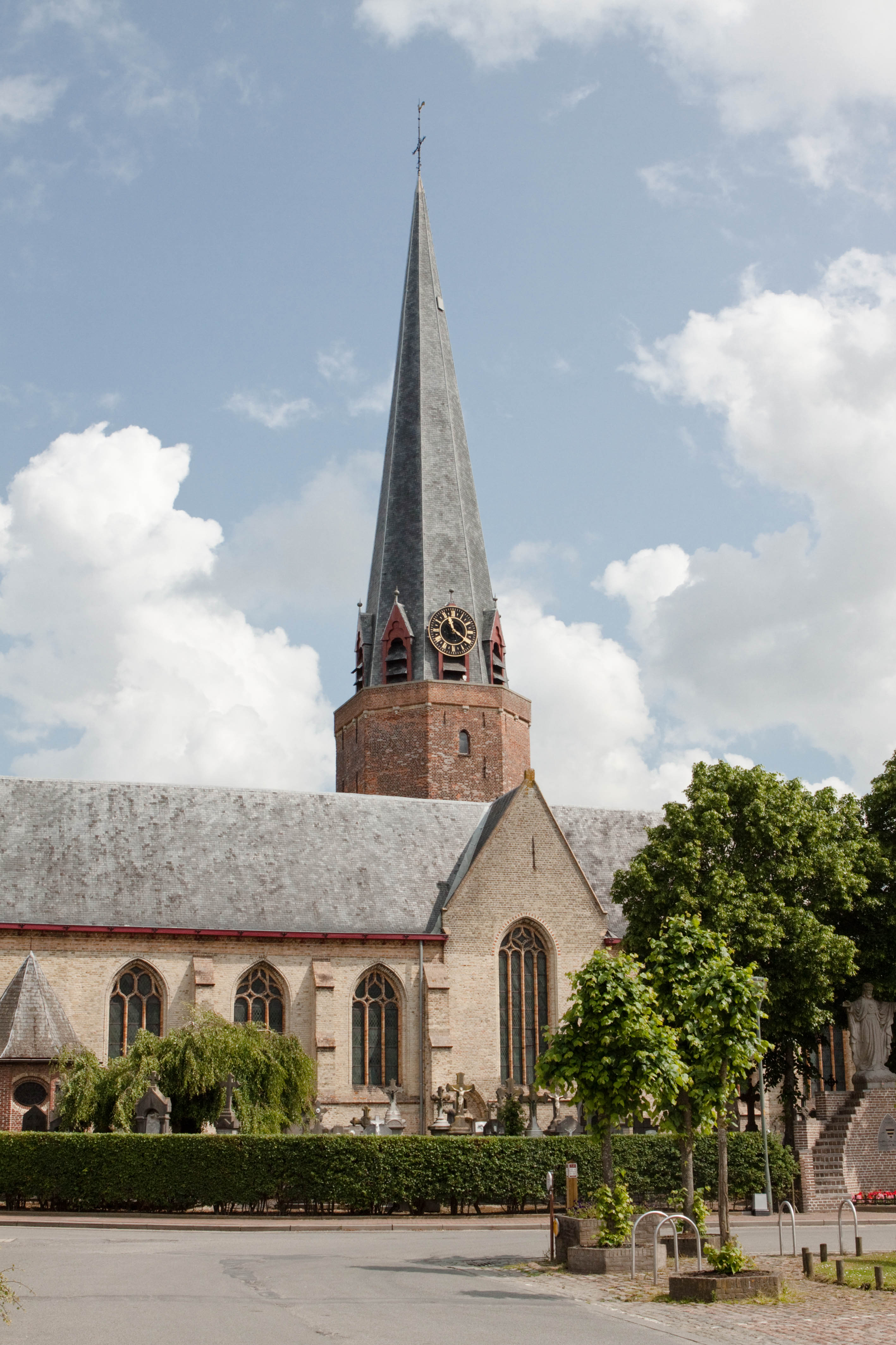
Sint-Bavokerk
