= Roesbrugge =

Village in West Flanders, Belgium

Coordinates: 50°55′N 2°37′E

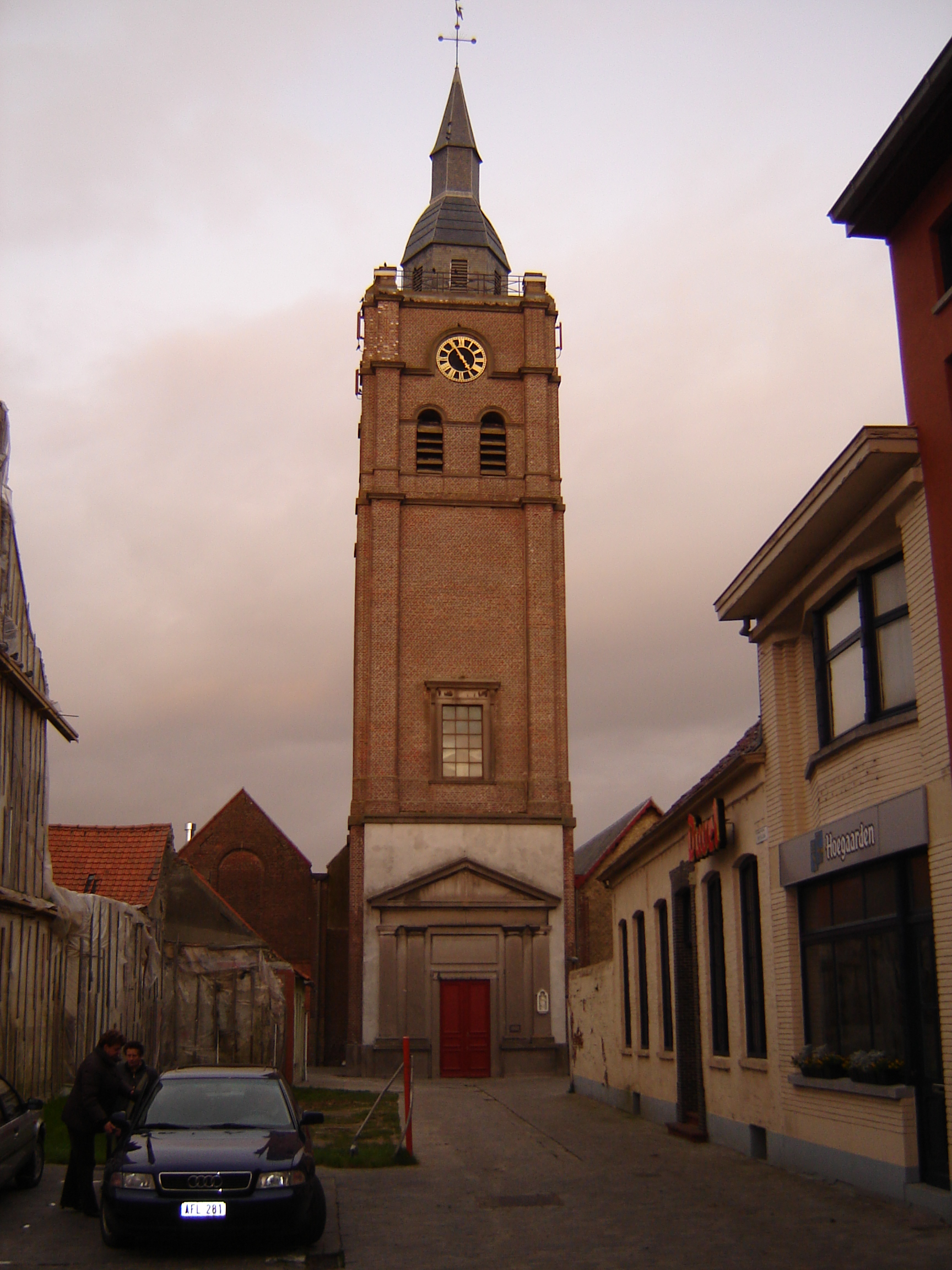
Sint-Martinuskerk (Saint Martin Church)

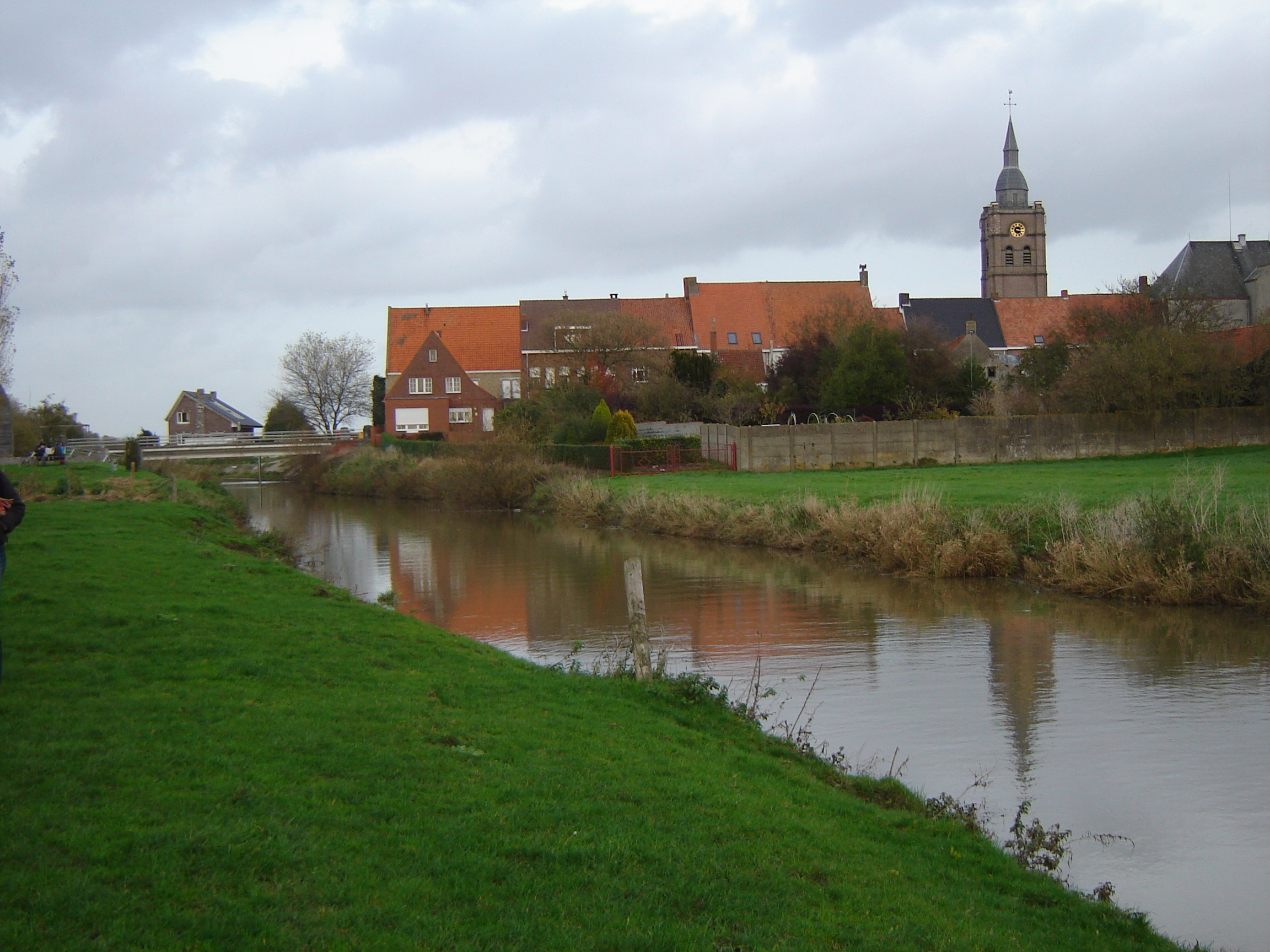
Roesbrugge along the Yser

Roesbrugge is a small rural village in the Belgian province of West Flanders. Roesbrugge is the larger of two villages that make up the "deelgemeente" Roesbrugge-Haringe in the municipality of Poperinge. Roesbrugge is located in the northwestern part of Poperinge and in the northern part of Roesbrugge-Haringe. The town center is located along the Yser river. An old branch of this river, the Dode IJzer (Dead Yser) makes up the northern border of the town center. The built-up area extends across the Dode IJzer into the hamlet Beveren-Kalsijde, a settlement on the territory of Beveren-aan-de-IJzer in the municipality of Alveringem. The small village of Haringe is located one kilometer to the southwest of Roesbrugge; both make up the deelgemeente Roesbrugge-Haringe.

The Catholic church and parish of Roesbrugge are named after Saint Martin. The church was built between 1806 and 1837.

== See also ==
- Roesbrugge-Haringe
