= Proven =

- Deelgemeente
- Coordinates: 50°53′25″N 2°39′27″E
- Country: Belgium
- Province: West Flanders
- Municipality: Poperinge

Area
  - Total: 13.10 km^{2} (5.06 sq mi)

Population (1999)
  - Total: 1,394
- Source: NIS
- Postal code: 8972

Proven is a rural village in the Belgian province of West Flanders, and a "deelgemeente" of the municipality Poperinge. The village has about 1400 inhabitants. (specifically, 1,394 inhabitants as of 1999).

The church and parish of Proven are named after Saint Victor. The Saint Victor Church was rebuilt in 1806, after the late Gothic church from the early 17th century burnt down in 1802.In popular speech, the tower is called "peperbus" (pepper shaker).
