= Roesbrugge-Haringe =

- Deelgemeente
- Coordinates: 50°55′09″N 2°37′35″E
- Country: Belgium
- Province: West Flanders
- Municipality: Poperinge

Area
  - Total: 11.95 km^{2} (4.61 sq mi)

Population (1999)
  - Total: 1,105
  - Density: 92/km^{2} (240/sq mi)
- Source: NIS
- Postal code: 8972

Roesbrugge-Haringe is a place in the Belgian province of West Flanders. It is a part of the municipality (a deelgemeente) of Poperinge. Roesbrugge-Haringe consists of two small rural villages, Roesbrugge and Haringe, located in the north western region of Poperinge. Roesbrugge, the largest of both villages, is located along the Yser river. Haringe is located one kilometer to the southwest of Roesbrugge, close to the French border.

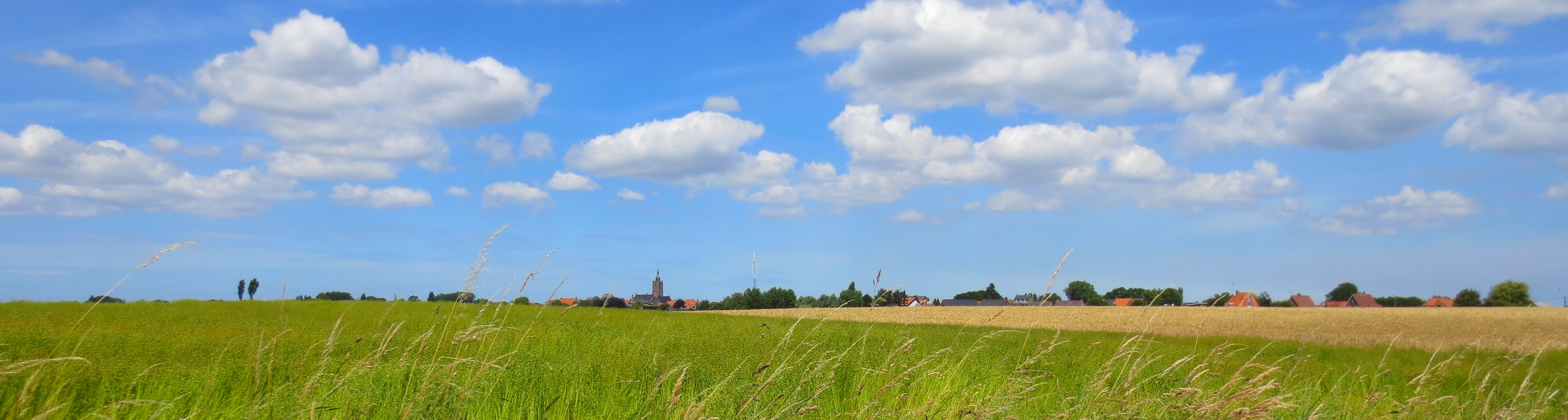
Roesbrugge
