= Perpignan Tigers =

The Perpignan Tigers are an Australian rules football team based in Perpignan, France. As of 2018, the team primarily competes in the national competitions in France including the Championnat de France and the French Cup. The team typically wears red and yellow jumpers.

== History ==
First formed in 2008, the Perpignan Tigers played their first friendly match in early 2009 against the Montpellier Firesharks before competing in the Championnat de France for the first time during the 2009/2010 season, finishing 5th overall. The club did not participate in the 2012/2013 and 2013/2014 season of the league due to a lack of players before returning to play in the 2014/2015 season in which they finished 8th. The following season the Tigers just missed out on the finals in finishing 5th in the league.

The team hosted the 2016 French Cup, finishing 4th overall. The Tigers also hosted the 2016 edition of the Coupe du Sud (Southern France Cup) finishing as champions.

== Results ==
Championnat de France
Season	Wins	Losses	Draws	Points For	Points Against	Final Placing
2009/2010	1	4	0	222	599	5th
2010/2011	1	3	0	271	455	6th
2011/2012	2	2	0	200	200	7th
2014/2015	0	7	0	208	963	8th
2015/2016	3	4	0	350	815	5th
2016/2017	2	5	0	510	807	6th
