= Abeele Aerodrome Military Commonwealth War Graves Commission Cemetery =

Cemetery in West Flanders, Belgium

Abeele Aerodrome Military
- Commonwealth War Graves Commission
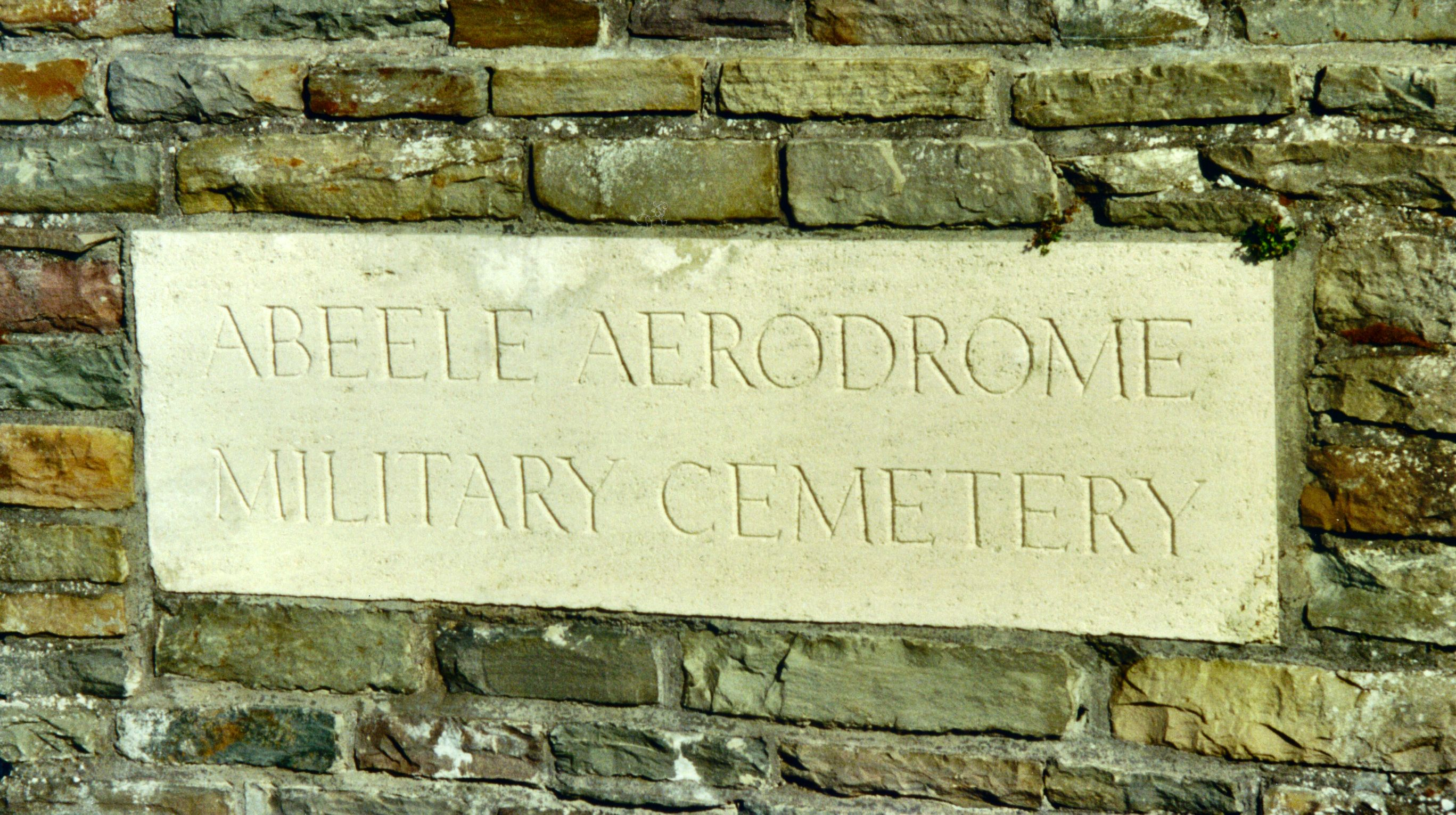
- Abeele Aerodrome Military Commonwealth War Graves Commission cemetery
- Used for those deceased April - September 1918
- Established: 1918
- Location: 50°48′56″N 02°39′26″E near Abele, West Flanders, Belgium
- Designed by: G H Goldsmith
- Total burials: 104
- Unknowns: 0

Burials by nation
- Allied Powers: United Kingdom: 104

Burials by war
- World War I: 104

Abeele Aerodrome Military Cemetery is a Commonwealth War Graves Commission (CWGC) burial ground for the dead of the First World War located in the Ypres Salient on the Western Front.

The cemetery grounds were assigned to the United Kingdom in perpetuity by King Albert I of Belgium in recognition of the sacrifices made by the British Empire in the defence and liberation of Belgium during the war.

== Foundation ==
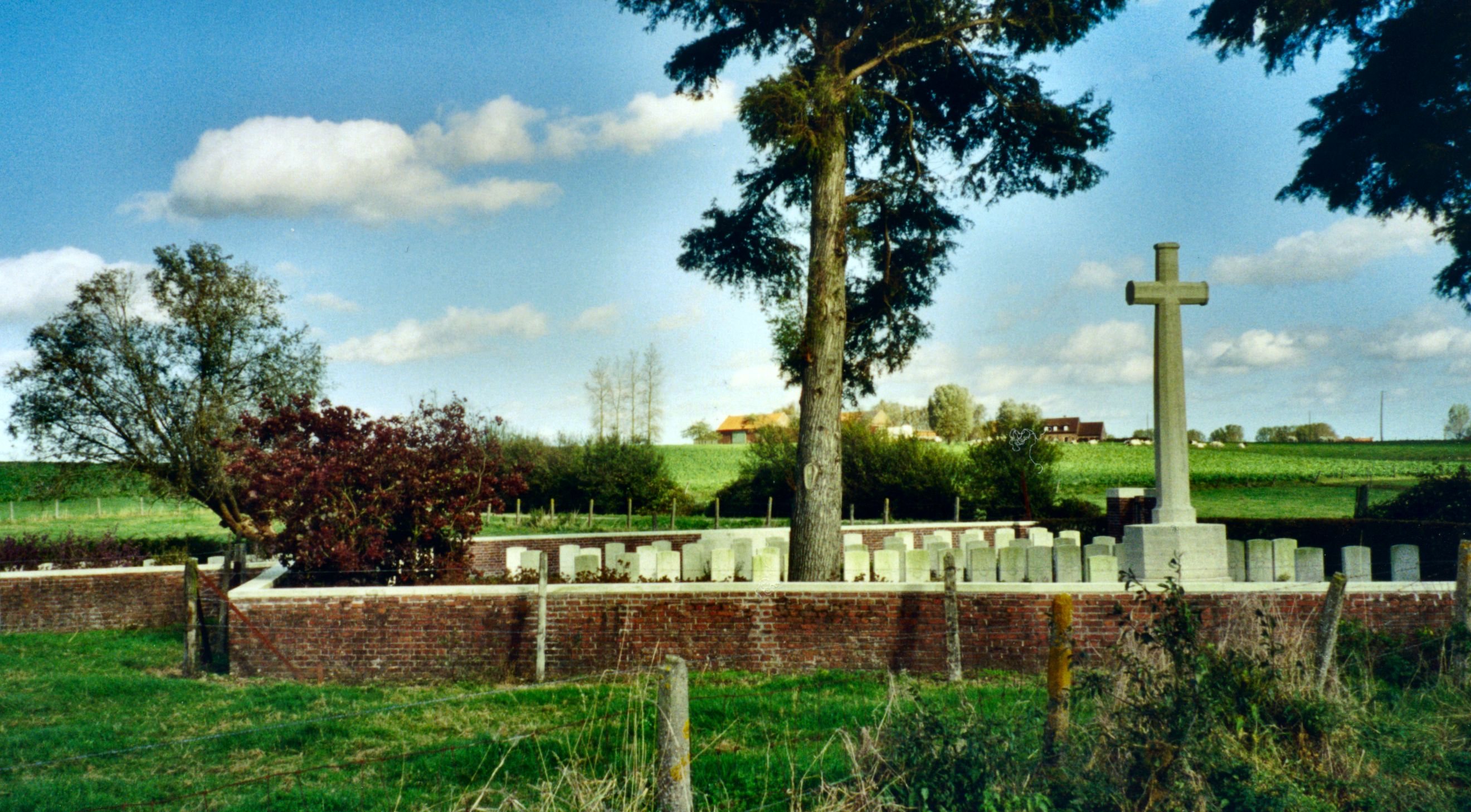
Abeele Aerodrome cemetery.

The cemetery, at Abele in Belgium but metres from the border with France, was founded by French troops in April 1918, receiving Commonwealth and American burials between July and September 1918.

After the Armistice, the French and American graves were concentrated at other cemeteries, leaving just Commonwealth burials. These were increased by concentrating 25 graves from the nearby Boeschepe churchyard in France.

The cemetery is named for the wartime aerodrome established in nearby fields although the cemetery itself contains no Royal Air Force graves.

The cemetery was designed by G. H. Goldsmith, who also designed Orient House in Manchester.

== Notable graves ==
Reference works point to two unusual inscriptions on gravestones in this cemetery. One asks the poignant question "Old Pal, why don't you answer me", whilst another, less unusually, is in Welsh and reads "Arglwydd Dangos Ini Tad Digon Yw Ini".

== Casualties by Units ==
This is a list of the 104 known casualties in the cemetery, Commonwealth and foreign casualties are given in bold.

Buffs: 14	Sherwood Foresters: 11
West Yorkshire Regiment: 11	King's Shropshire Light Infantry: 8
York and Lancaster Regiment: 9	Lancashire Fusiliers: 7
Royal Engineers: 7	Royal Field Artillery: 7
Cheshire Regiment: 7	Middlesex Regiment: 3
North Staffordshire Regiment: 3	Royal Army Medical Corps: 2
Royal Garrison Artillery: 2	Duke of Wellington's Regiment: 1
Queen's Royal Regiment: 1	Royal Irish Fusiliers: 1
South Wales Borderers: 1	King's Regiment: 1
Royal Irish Rifles: 1	Seaforth Highlanders: 1
Royal Inniskilling Fusiliers: 1	Highland Light Infantry: 1
King's Royal Rifle Corps: 1	Manchester Regiment: 1
Army Cyclist Corps: 1	
