= Watou =

Village in West Flandres, Belgium

Coordinates: 50°52′N 2°37′E

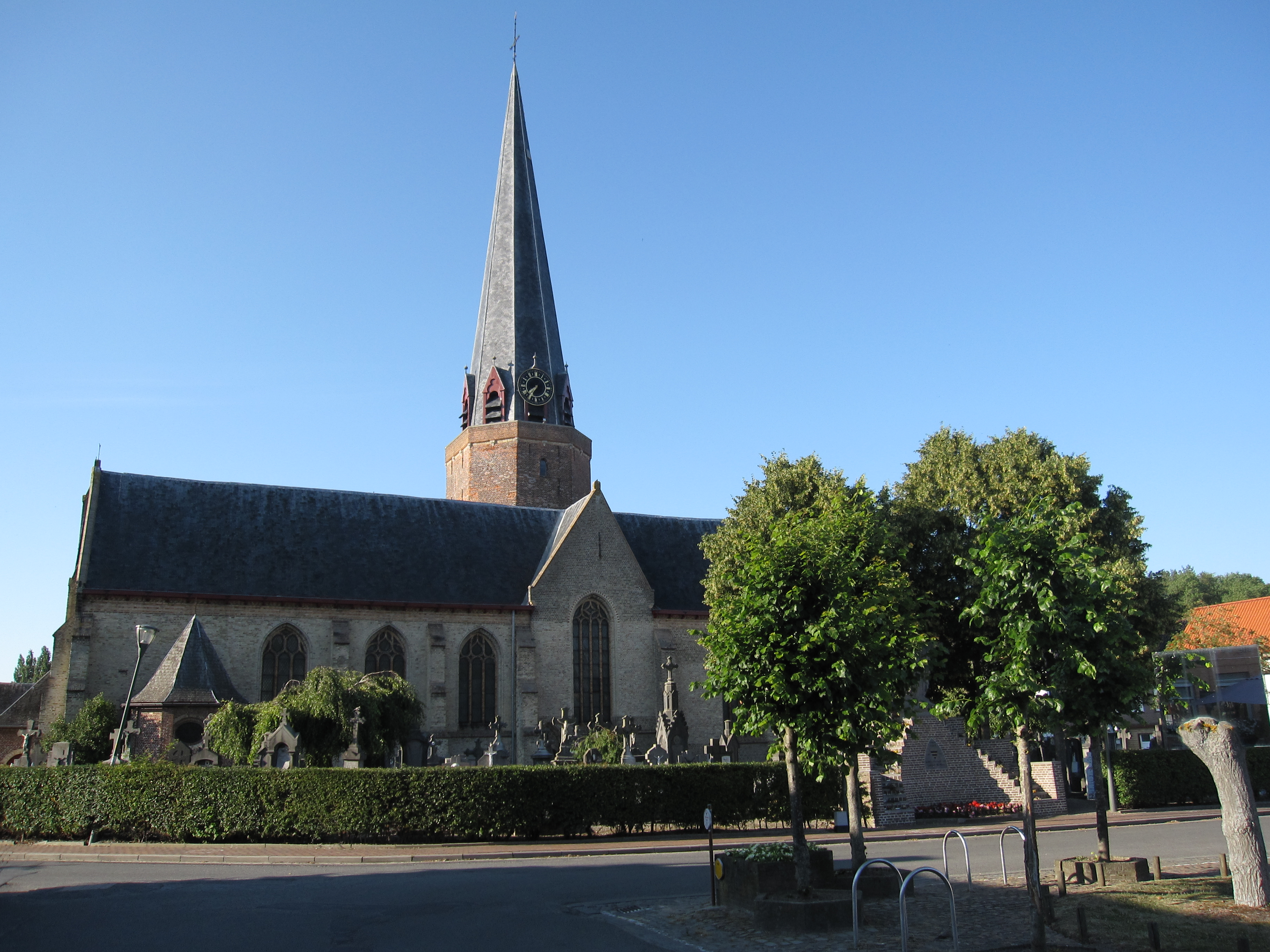
The St. Bavo Church and cemetery

Watou is a village in the Belgian province of West Flanders and a district of the town of Poperinge. The village has a population of 1,900. It lies on the border with France. The hamlet Abele is part of Watou. Poperinge is situated on the border with the hamlet of Sint-Jan-ter-Biezen.

== Art ==
Every summer, from June until September, the Watou Arts Festival takes place in this village close to the French border. Poets, visual artists and upcoming talent settle in and create high level art throughout the village. Watou offers special locations as exhibition spaces, like a former monastery, an old farmhouse, a school or the cellar of a brewery. The interaction between surprising spaces with sublime contemporary art and poetry provides a unique art experience each year.

== Other ==
St. Bernardus Brewery and Brouwerij Van Eecke are located in Watou.

The St. Bavo Church dates partly from the 12th century.

The Watou church and cemetery is located next to Watouplein, the square in the center of the village. During World War I, Watou and its surroundings were a quiet resting area behind the lines. No armed conflicts took place here, so Watou Churchyard saw only a few war burials between April 1915 (Second Battle of Ypres) and the Armistice of 11 November 1918.

== See also ==
- Sint-Jan-ter-Biezen

== Beers brewed in Watou ==
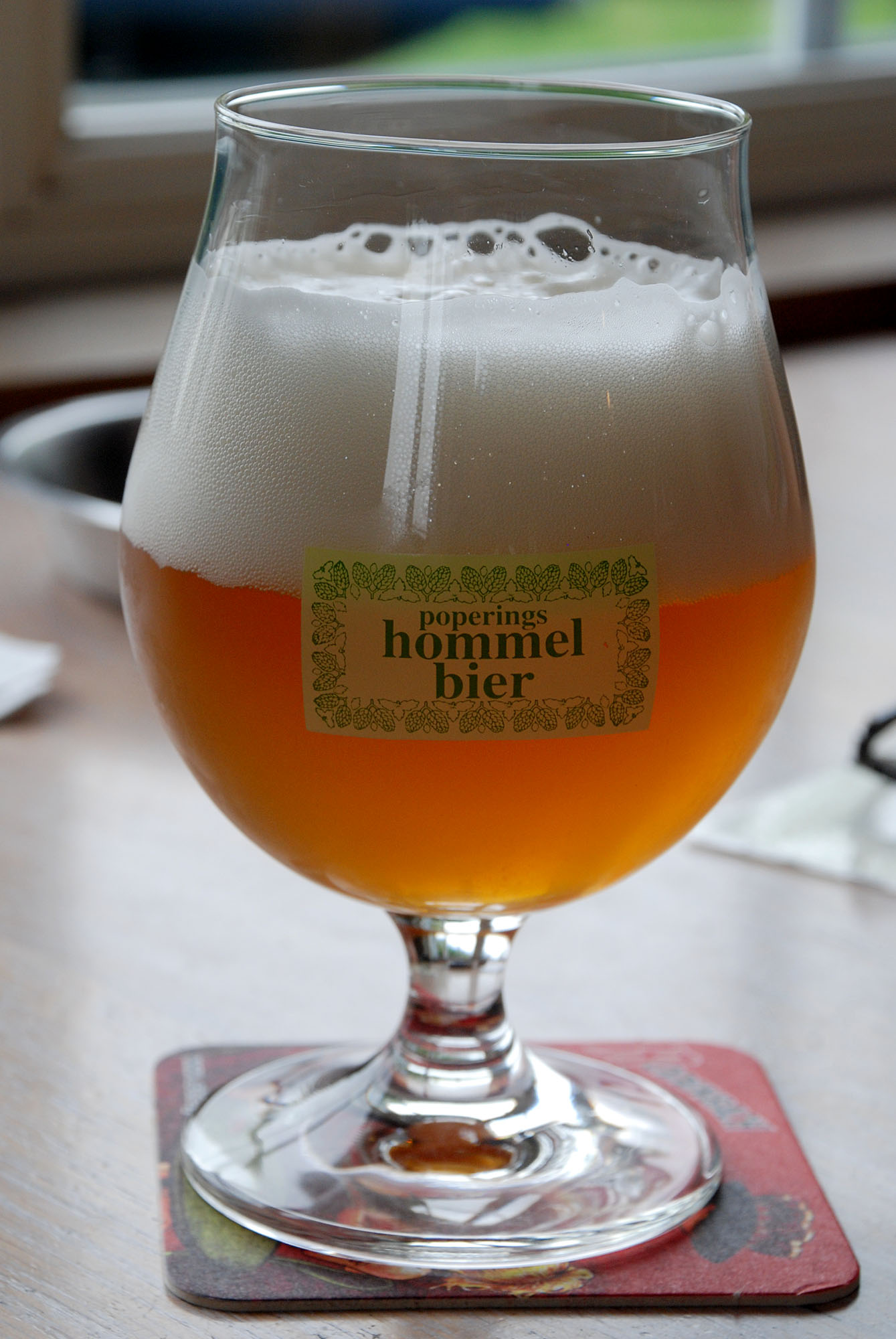
Hommelbier from the Brouwerij Van Eecke

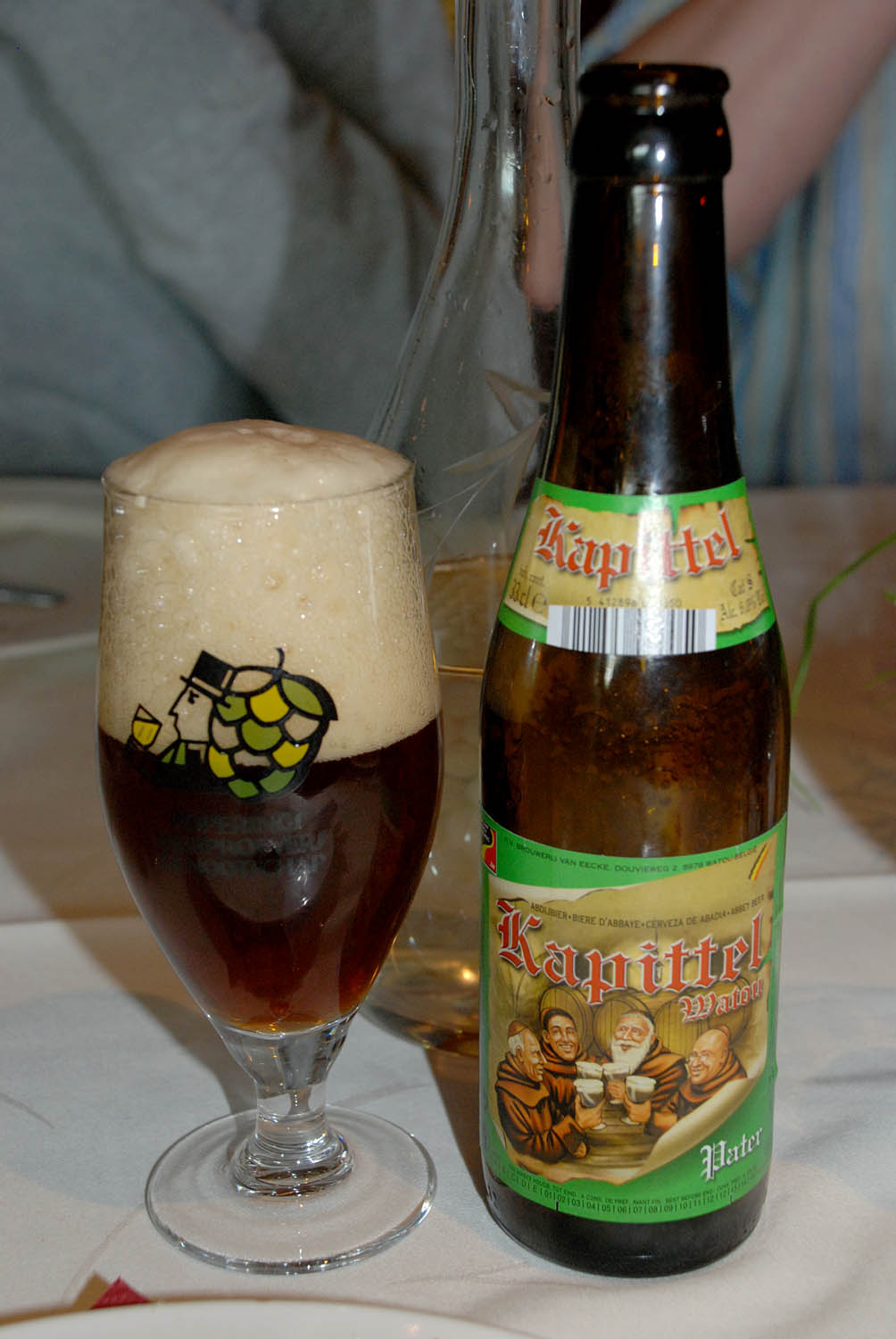
Kappitel
