= Poperinge =

- City and municipality
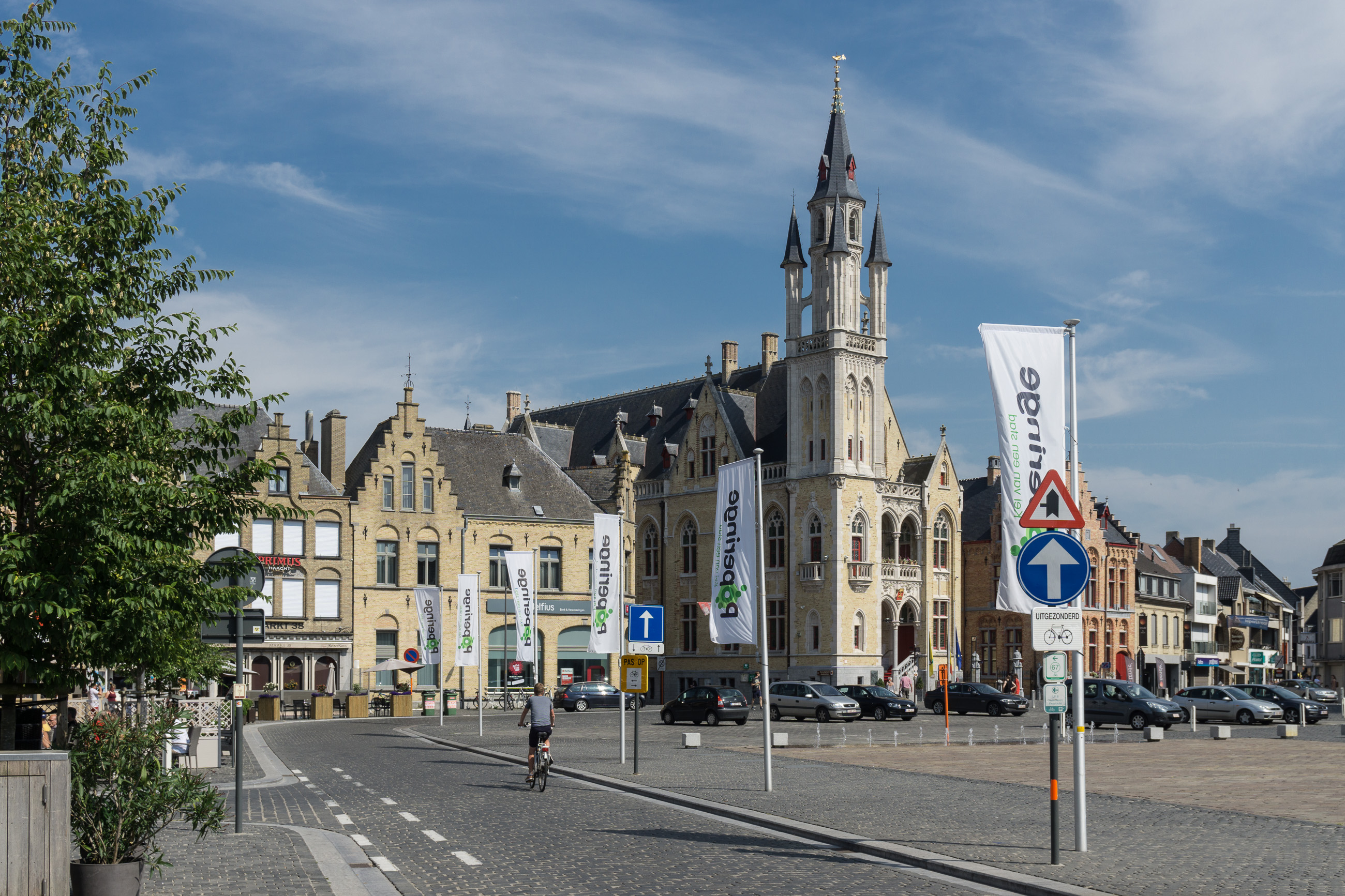
- Street banners welcome visitors to Poperinge's Town Hall and Grote Market

- Flag Coat of arms

- Location of Poperinge in West Flanders
- Interactive map of Poperinge
- Location in Belgium
- Coordinates: 50°51′N 02°44′E
- Country: Belgium
- Community: Flemish Community
- Region: Flemish Region
- Province: West Flanders
- Arrondissement: Ypres

Government
  - Mayor: Christof Dejaegher (CD&V)
  - Governing parties: CD&V, Samen

Area
  - Total: 120.37 km^{2} (46.48 sq mi)

Population (2022-01-01)
  - Total: 19,782
  - Density: 164.34/km^{2} (425.65/sq mi)
- Postal codes: 8970, 8972, 8978
- NIS code: 33021
- Area codes: 057
- Website: www.poperinge.be

Poperinge (Dutch pronunciation: [ˈpoːpəˌrɪŋə]; French: Poperinghe, Poperingue [pɔpʁɛ̃ɡ]; West Flemish: Poperienge) is a city and municipality located in the Belgian province of West Flanders, Flemish Region, and has a history going back to medieval times. The municipality comprises the town of Poperinge proper and surrounding villages. The area is famous for its hops and lace.

== The town ==
Poperinge is situated about 13 km (8 miles) to the west of Ypres (Ieper). The region is famous for growing hops and furnishes 80% of Belgian production. The town is home to the national hop museum and is called "hops city", hoppe stad in Dutch, a play on hoofd stad, the word for capital. A triennial hop festival and parade is held in the month of September. The local brew is known as Hommel (which means hops in the West Flanders dialect).

The carillon in the tower of the town's oldest church, Sint-Bertinuskerk, was noted as one of the most beautiful in Flanders in medieval times. It was destroyed during wartime in 1677 and restored in 1781.

== Administration ==
In addition to the town centre of Poperinge, the municipality also comprises the submunicipalities (so-called deelgemeenten) of Krombeke, Proven, Reningelst, Roesbrugge-Haringe and Watou. The hamlets of Abele and Sint-Jan-Ter-Biezen are also within the municipality, but they do not have the status of deelgemeente, since they were not independent municipalities before the mergers of municipalities that took place in Belgium in the 1970s.

Roesbrugge-Haringe comprises the villages of Roesbrugge and Haringe. The hamlet of Abele is on the border with France and partially lies on French territory.

#	Name	Area	Population (1999)
I	Poperinge	47,61	12.644
II	Krombeke	8,54	711
III	Proven	13,10	1.394
IV	Reningelst	15,20	1.405
V (VII) (VIII)	Roesbrugge-Haringe: Roesbrugge; Haringe	11,60	1.105
VI (IX) (X)	Watou: Sint-Jan-Ter-Biezen; Abele	23,28	1.940

The municipality borders many rural villages, and because of the long border is also close to many French municipalities.

== History ==
Archaeological finds in the area date local habitation back to the Neolithic period. Under the Romans a link was made to it from the road between Cassel and Aardenburg. In the time of the Franks it appeared under the name Pupurningahem and was made subject to the ecclesiastical benefice of Saint Omer in the mid-7th century. The Count of Flanders, Dietrich of Alsace, granted the town a charter in 1147 at the request of the abbot. From this time it began to thrive as a cloth-making centre and, in order to accommodate the growing population, the churches of Saint John and of Our Lady were added in 1290 to the already existing Sint-Bertinuskerk.

In 1322 Louis de Nevers forbade cloth-making outside Ypres, which led the citizenry to join a revolt against him the following year. Nor did they ever submit to this restraint on their prosperity and were forever finding new ways to evade the restriction. Their resistance during this period gained them the nickname of keikoppen (cobble-heads), a term first recorded in 1341, when the Ypres militia took revenge on the town.

During the disturbances associated with the Hundred Years War, Poperinge suffered from the shifting allegiances of the Counts of Flanders and their commercial consequences. When they supported the French, the wool trade with England was interrupted. In the course of the consequent revolt, the town was sacked and burned by French troops in 1382. Then in 1436 it suffered the same fate from an English army. In 1513, at a time of declining prosperity, much of the town was again destroyed by fire, and then in 1563 the same happened again. During this period Poperinge was stirred up to support the Protestant cause and took part in the iconoclastic fury of 1566. It was in the consequent fighting and persecution that the town and its trade were finally ruined.

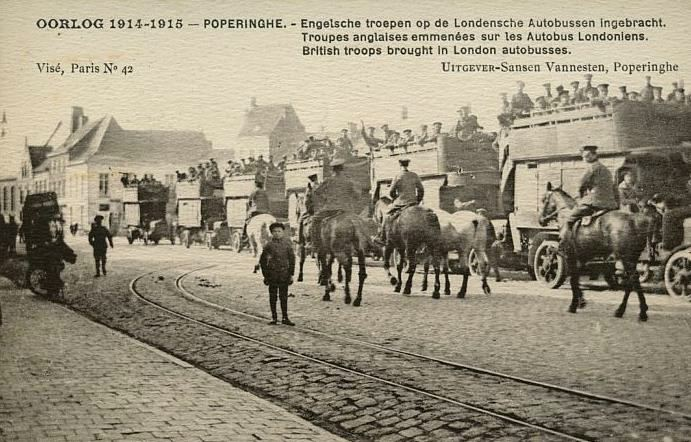
Defending the town in 1914

Matters were made worse by the wars between the French and the Dutch for control of the region. By the treaty of Nijmegen in 1678 the town passed into French hands and then returned to the Spaniards by the treaty of Ryswick in 1697, before being ceded to the Austrians in 1713 by the treaty of Utrecht. In 1794 it was absorbed by revolutionary France into the département of Lys. Following the defeat of Napoleon it was included in the United Kingdom of the Netherlands, from which Belgium revolted in 1830. Since then Poperinge has repaired its fortunes by concentrating on hop production, the growing of which was first introduced in the 15th century.

During World War I, the town was one of only two in Belgium not under German occupation. It was used to billet British troops and also provided a safe area for field hospitals. Known familiarly as "Pop", it was just behind the front line and formed an important link for the soldiers and their families, especially through the rest house known as Talbot House (or "Toc H"). A grim reminder of that time remains within the town hall, where two death cells are preserved, and outside in the courtyard, where there is a public execution post used by firing squads. Another reminder is the location of a number of military cemeteries on the outskirts of the town with the graves of Canadian, British, Australian, French, German, US servicemen and men of the Chinese Labour Corps. One of these is Lijssenthoek Military Cemetery for soldiers who had been wounded near Ypres and later died in the large Allied casualty clearing stations located in the area.

== Transportation ==
Poperinge railway station is the terminus of Belgian railway line 69, which used to continue to Hazebrouck in France until the 1950s. It has an hourly service, IC-04, to Kortrijk and Antwerpen.

== Literary associations ==
Poperinge is mentioned by two major English poets. Geoffrey Chaucer makes it the birthplace of his Flemish knight in "The Tale of Sir Thopas" from the Canterbury Tales. Some 150 years later John Skelton follows a line in Flemish with the mention that 'In Popering grew pears when parrot was an egg' in his enigmatic poem "Speak Parrot". The poem is an attack on Cardinal Wolsey and the line is taken to refer to his ambition to become Pope.

The town has also been associated with several Neo-Latin poets. Jacques May (Jacobus Majus) was born in Poperinge and left a Latin verse epistle in sapphics dated 1563. Later in the century Maximiliaan de Vriendt, who was born elsewhere, wrote a poem that praised the town and its churches:

Non formosa pales, non hospitae in urbe napeae,
Non agiles radii, Palidiique coli
Non celebres baiae (quae dos tua propria) tantis
Nominibus celebrem te, Poperinga vehunt:
Quantum larga manus, pietasque insigne avorum,
In superos templis testificata sacris.
Omnia de nobis praedantur fata: Tonanti
Quas damus, has solas semper habemus opes.

The Flemish poet Gislain de Coninck, who was born in the town, translated the Latin poems of Charles Wynkius in Himni, Quorum Usus Est In Ecclesiastico Dei Cultu, and the two were published together in 1573. Then in the following century there were two more Latin poets from the town, Joannes Bartholomaeus Roens and Petrus Wenis (1648-1726). Wenis published Gheestelycken nachtegael (The Spiritual Nightingale, 1698) on the miracle that restored a still-born child to life in 1479, an event associated with the statue of Our Lady in Sint-Janskerk that is still celebrated.

In modern times, the town was referred to in one of the epigrams in Charles Baudelaire's Amœnitates Belgicæ. In “Une Béotie belge” the sophisticated French-speakers of Brussels look down on the rustic Poperinghe of their Flemish compatriots. In the following century, the town is the subject of the imagist night piece "Poperinghe 1917" by the Canadian poet W. W. E. Ross.

== Notable people ==
- Dirk Frimout (born 1941), Belgium's first astronaut; the town park is named after him
- Anne Provoost (born 1964), Flemish novelist

== Twin towns – sister cities ==
Poperinge is twinned with:

- Frielendorf, Germany
- Hythe, England, United Kingdom
- Rixensart, Belgium
- Wolnzach, Germany
- Žatec, Czech Republic

== Gallery ==
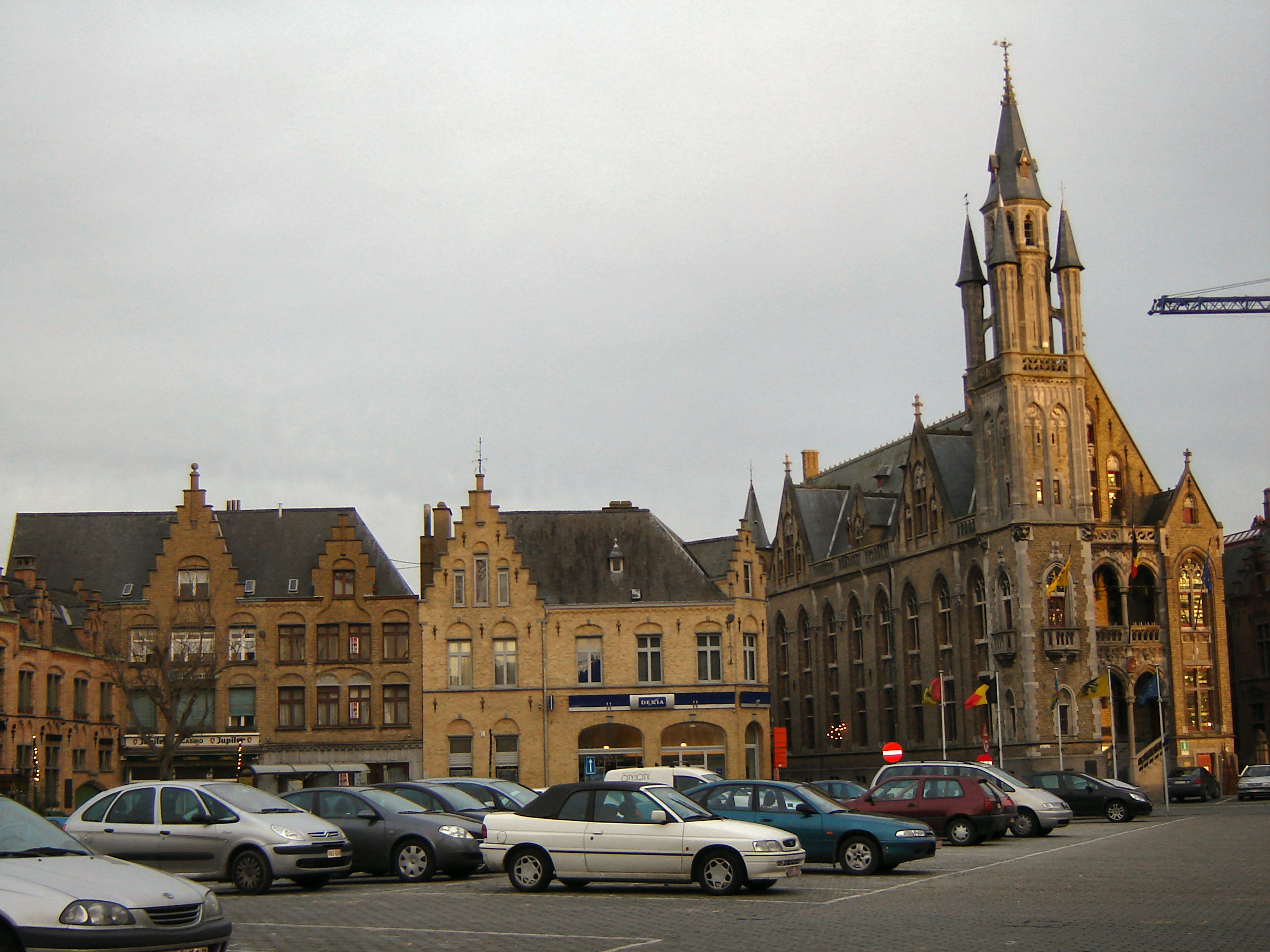
Poperinge Town Hall in 2007

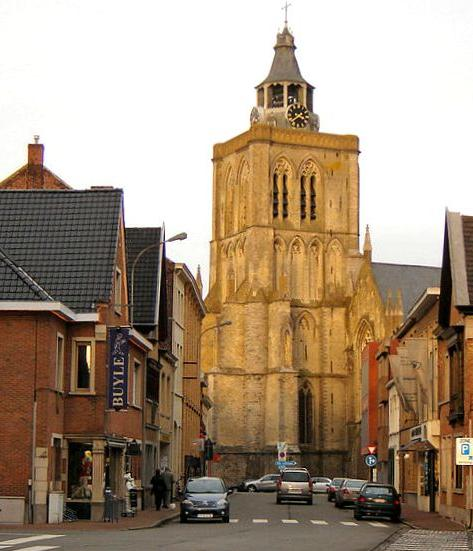
Sint Bertinuskerk, the oldest church in Poperinge

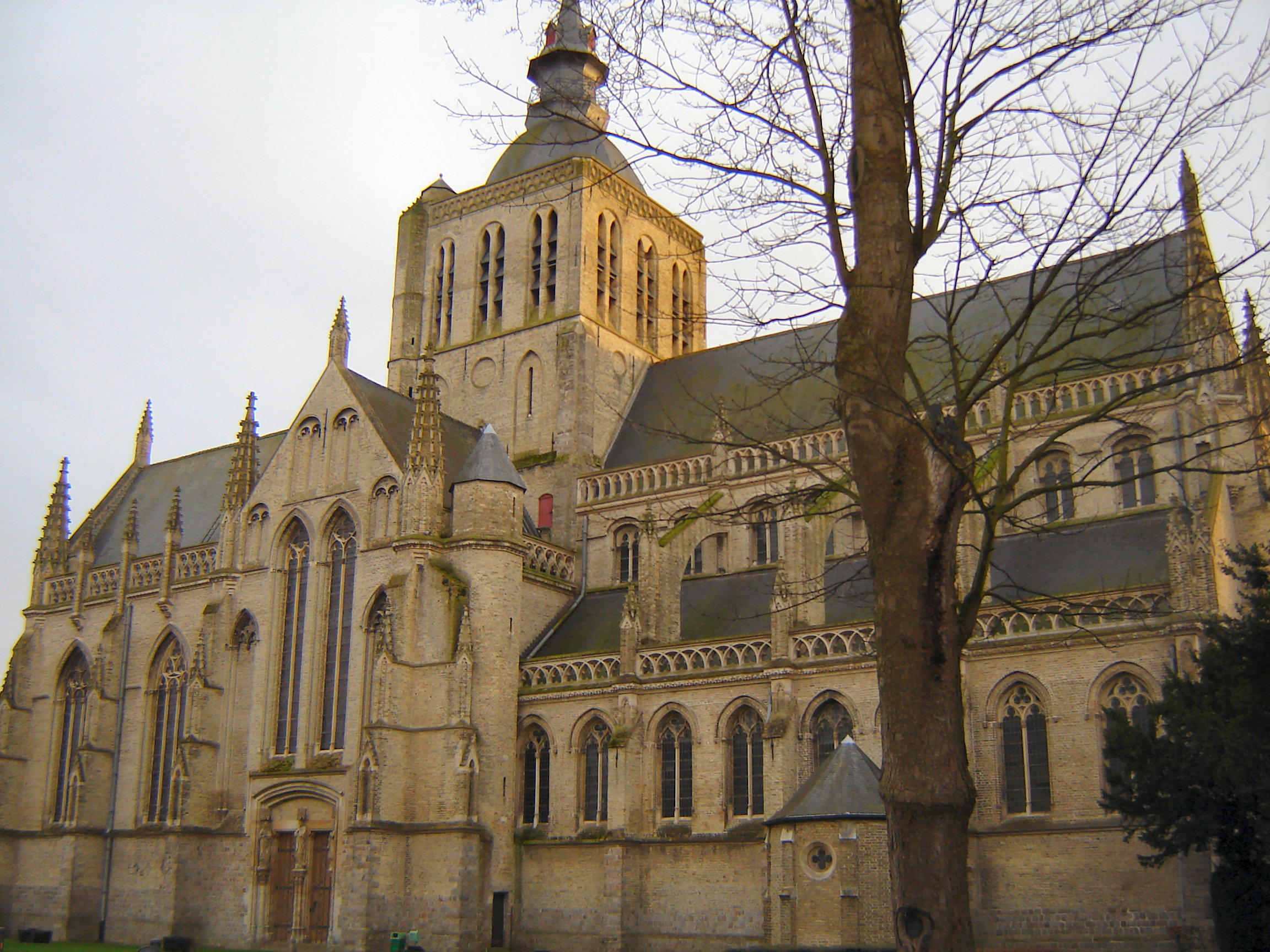
Sint Janskerk, the site of the mediaeval miracle

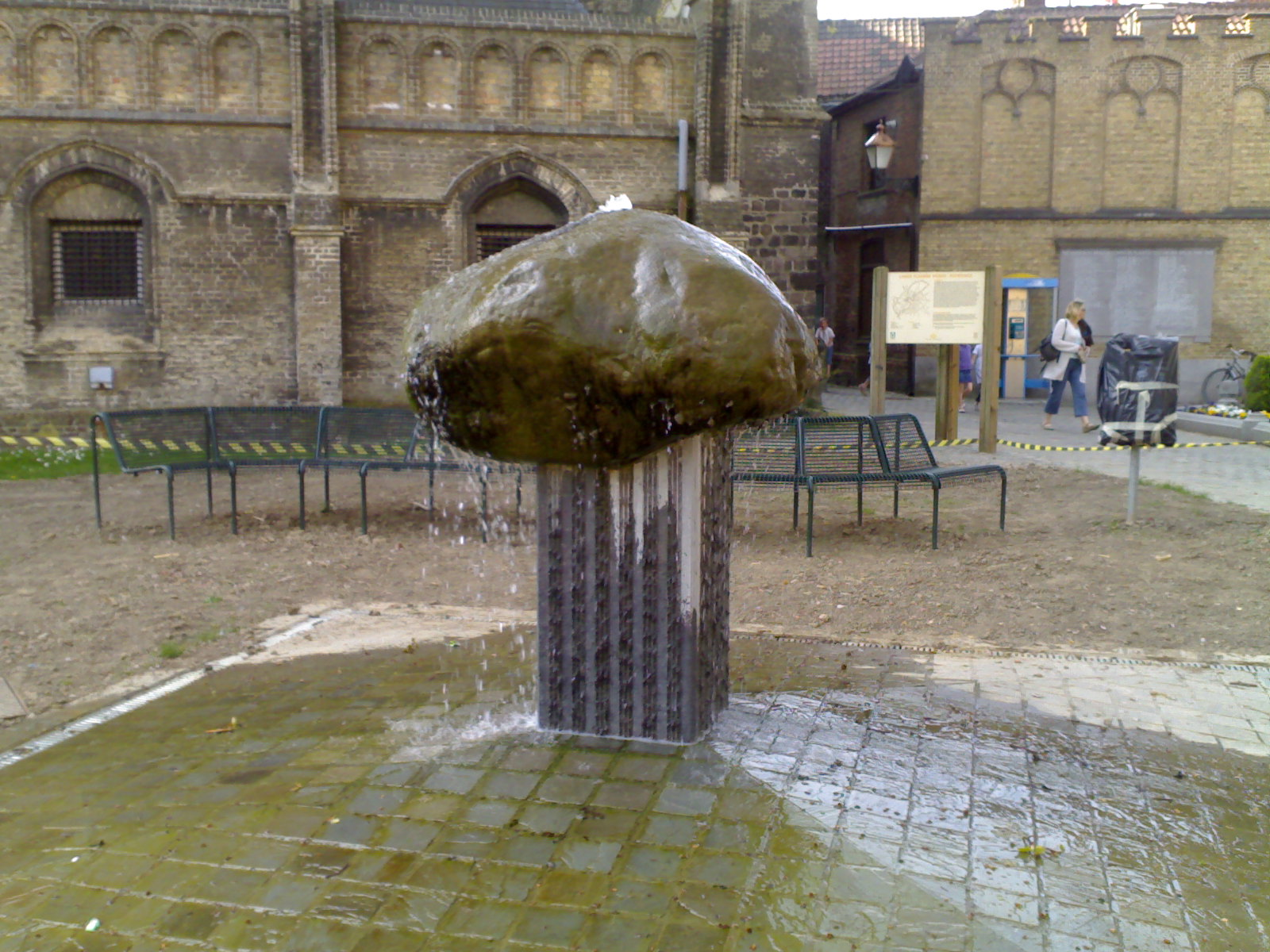
The keikop monument to the obstinacy of the citizens

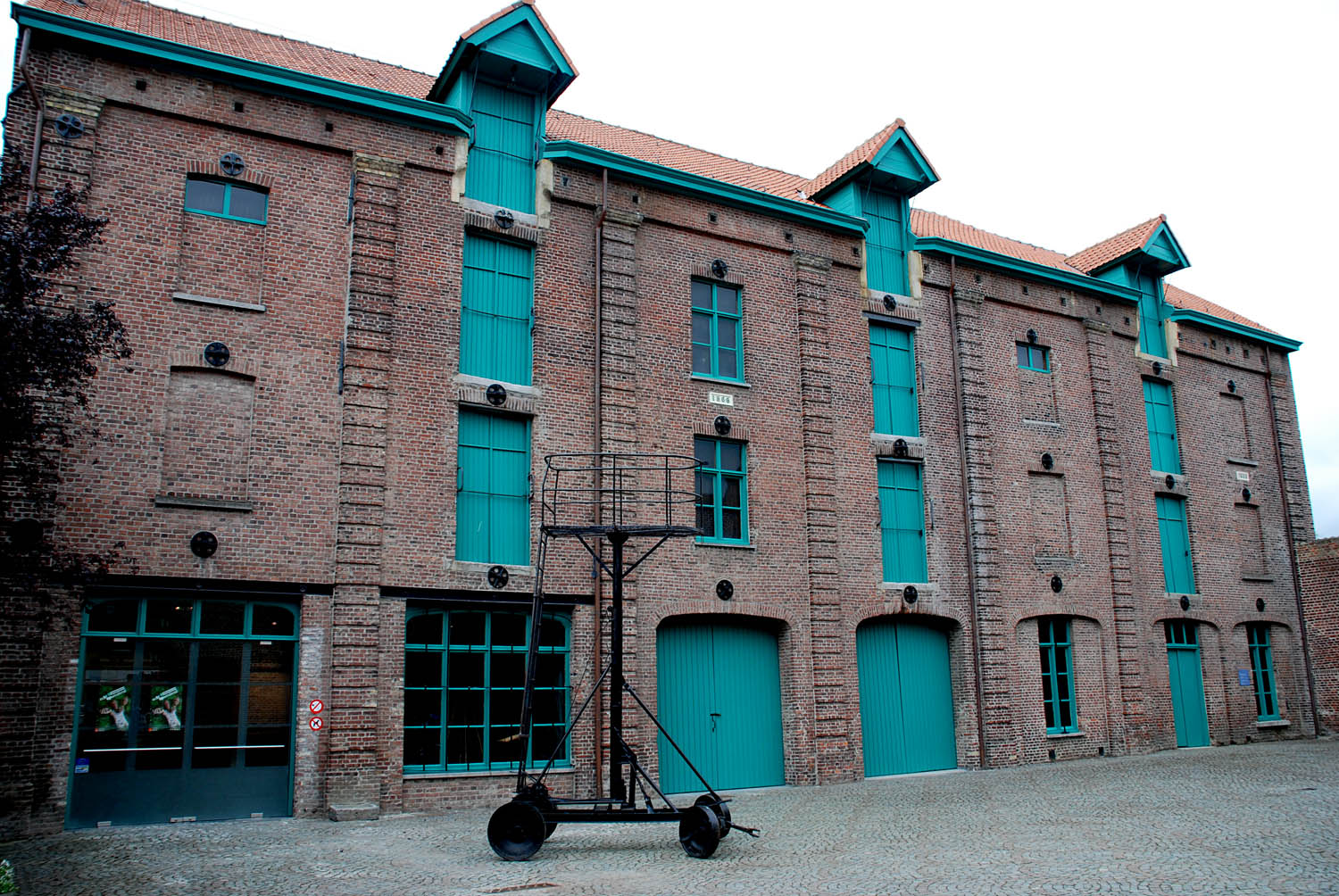
An old warehouse at the hop museum

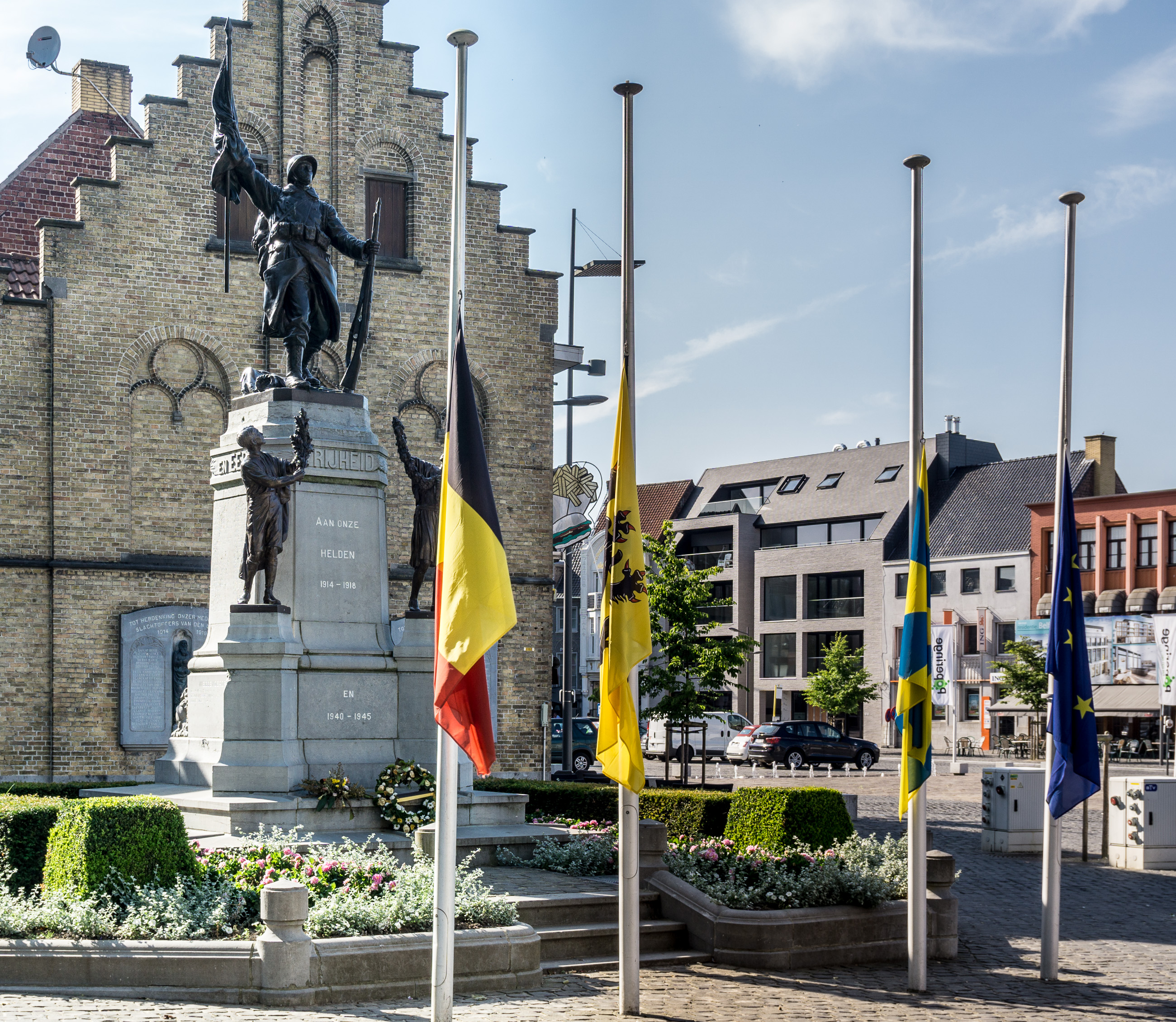
War memorial
