= French Championship (disambiguation) =

The French Rugby League Championship is the major rugby league tournament for French professional and semi-professional clubs.

French Championships or French Championship may also refer to:

== French national championships ==
- Division 1 Féminine (French: Championnat de France de Football Féminin), women's football
- Elite One Championship (French: Le Championnat de France Elite), rugby league
- French Chess Championship
- French Figure Skating Championships
- French Gymnastics Championships
- French National Road Race Championships, cycling
- French Rhythmic Gymnastics Championships
- Ligue 1, association football
- Ligue Magnus, ice hockey
- Rink Hockey French Championship, hockey on roller skates

== Tennis competitions ==
- French Community Championships, clay court tennis event
- French Covered Court Championships, 1895–1971
- French Open, one of four major tennis tournaments
- French Pro Championship tennis, 1930–1968

== Motor racing competitions ==
- FFSA GT Championship (French: Championnat de France FFSA GT, Grand Touring sports car racing
- French F4 Championship open-wheel auto racing
- French Rally Championship, rally auto racing
- French Supertouring Championship, a touring auto racing championship

== See also ==
- French Open (disambiguation)
