= Strasbourg Kangaroos =

Names
- Nickname(s): Kangaroos

2008 season
- After finals: 2nd

Club details
- Founded: 2005
- Colours: Black and White
- Competition: Union Française de Football Australien
- Coach: Mark Seemanpillai
- Captain(s): Adam Le Nevez
- Ground(s): Centre Sportif de Hautepierre

Other information
- Official website: http://www.strasbourgkangourous.com

The Strasbourg Kangaroos (Les Kangourous de Strasbourg in French) are a French Australian Football Club based in the north of France in Strasbourg. They are touted as being the biggest Aussie Rules club in France and have appeared in the French Championship twice.

== History ==
The Kangaroos were the first all-French Australian football club, which was founded in 2005 by a sports teacher, Marc Jund, and a small group of friends.

Within the ASFA (Association strasbourgeoise de football australien), the team tried to popularise the sport which is still relevantly unknown in France. The club also has tried to create links with the Australian football championships of Germany, which serves at the same time a good example of the development and episodical structure for training of the game.

The club joined the German Championship in 2006 although having to change their name for the occasion, adopting that of the Black Devils of Strasbourg. In being that the name of 'Kangaroos' was already used by a team from Munich.

The Black Devils also integrate the multisport club SUC (Strasbourg Université Club).

After having finished 5th of the German Championship, the club decided to leave AFLG in 2007 and reverted to the name of 'Kangaroos'.

In 2007 the club team took part in three friendly matches against German clubs. Nine players from the Kangaroos constituted the backbone of the French selection at the time of the European Championship in Hamburg, where they finished 7th.

In 2009 the French League was inaugurated. Strasbourg finished second in the French Championship behind Paris and fourth in the French Cup.

The Strasbourg Kangaroos are seeking new players for the 2010 season. Beginners and experienced players from Australia, France and elsewhere are welcome.

== Team ==
=== 2008 ===
- 1 Marc JUND (French selector, ex-International (France) )
- 2 Julien TANGUY (French International (France) )
- 5 Nicolas VOILAND
- 6 Adam LE NEVEZ (c) (French International (France) )
- 10 Nicolas COLOMB (French International (France) )
- 14 Olivier LEMESLE (Ex-International (France) , French Team Manager)
- 17 Adrien BONNEAU (French International (France) )
- 18 Alexandre RIEBEL (Ex-International (France) )

=== 2007 ===
- Grégory Choinka
- Jonathan Choinka
- Michaël Dargegen
- Yorick Decou
- Gwenhaël Deride
- Vincent Freeling
- Christophe Fressy
- Guillaume Jouanolle
- Marc Jund
- Frédéric Lancelin
- Olivier Lemesle
- Mickey Lemesle
- Adam Le Nevez
- Joevin L'Hotellier
- Guillermo Palau
- Alexandre Peuch
- Théo Renckert
- Alexandre Riebel
- Adrian Sambade
