= Australian rules football in England =

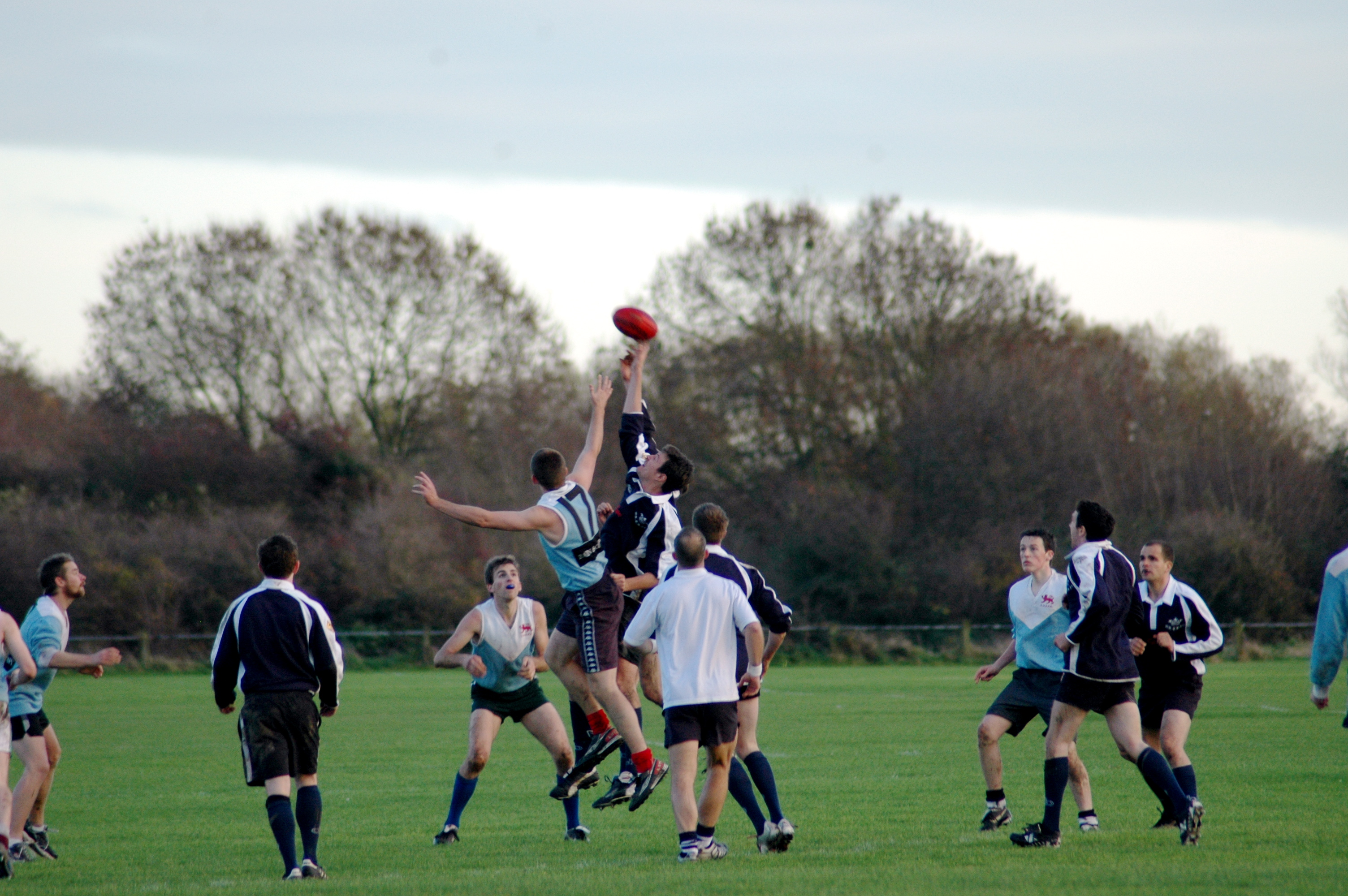
- Englands two oldest clubs Cambridge and Oxford Universities contest centre bounce in 2008
- Country: England
- Governing body: AFL England
- National team: England
- First played: 1888, London
- Registered players: 3,600 (total); 600 (adult); 3,000 (junior)
- Clubs: 49

Club competitions
- AFL London; AFL Central & Northern England; Southern England AFL; National University League

Audience records
- Single match: 18,884 (2005). West Coast v. Fremantle (The Oval, London)

In England, Australian rules football (known locally as "Aussie Rules") is a team and spectator sport with a long history. It is home to the longest-running Australian rules fixture outside Australia: the match between Oxford and Cambridge Universities which has been contested annually since 1923. All other current competitions originated in 1989 with the founding of what is now AFL London, the longest-running Australian rules football league in Europe. The current governing body, AFL England, was formed in 2012 and expanded the game in 2018 to include the additional regional divisions: AFL Central & Northern England and AFL Southern England.

Historians Geoffrey Blainey, Leonie Sandercock, Ian Turner and Tony Collins, Mark Pennings and Gillian Hibbins have all written in support for the code originating from and having the appearance of an English public school football game. Several of the sport's founders were born and educated there including J. B. Thompson, William Hammersley and James Bryant, while Tom Wills—held by many as the sport's founder—was educated at and played rugby with the Rugby School. However, it struggled for decades to establish roots given the dominance of traditional football codes in rugby football and the growing popularity of soccer. Nevertheless, it was one of the first countries outside of Australia where the game was played in the 1880s and to host regular competition.

Australian Football League (AFL) exhibition matches were held at The Oval in London semi-annually between 1986 and 2006 (the last standalone event was held in 2012) and were well attended, with attendances ranging from 4,500 to a record of 18,884 in 2005.

England rarely competes in a standalone team, and it is typically represented along with Scotland and Wales as the Great Britain team at the Australian Football International Cup (best result 6th) and AFL Europe Championship (2 titles). However, an English side has competed in several standalone tests and has been successful at the Euro Cup with 5 titles. Nevertheless, London has hosted several internationals, including the 2001 Atlantic Alliance Cup, the 2005 and 2015 EU Cups, and the 2016 and 2019 AFL Europe Championships.

English-born players have been successful at the sport's highest level in Australia. In the AFL, Bill Eason has the most games (220) and most goals (187). In the AFL Women's, Sabrina Frederick has the most games (103) and goals (35).

== History of Australian rules football in England ==
=== English involvement in the game's establishment in Australia ===
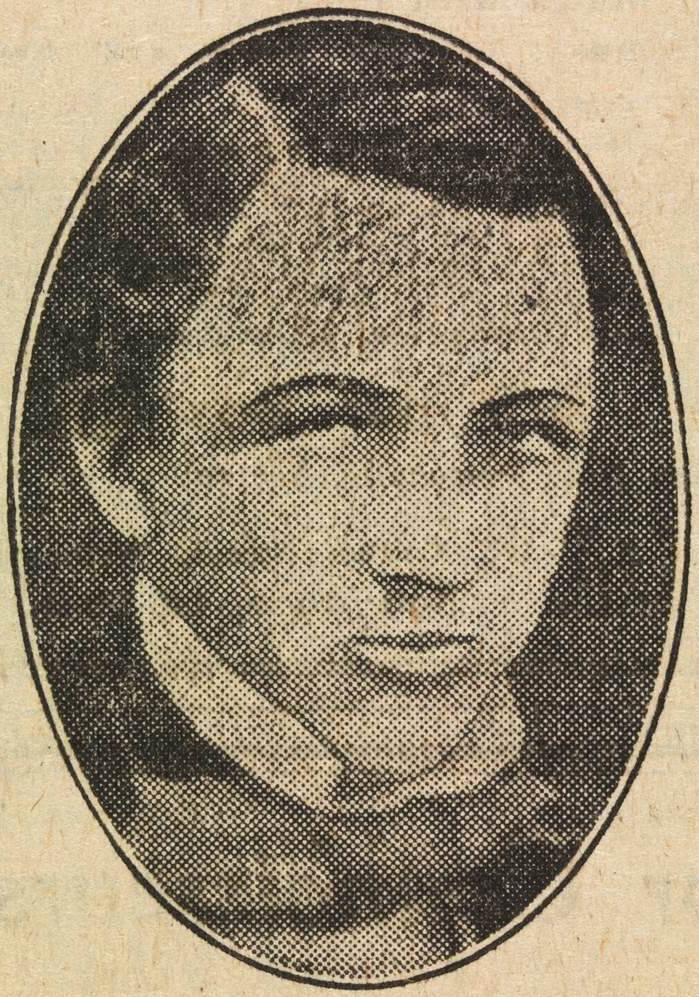
Daguerreotype of Tom Wills, founder of Australian Football, from his years at the Rugby School

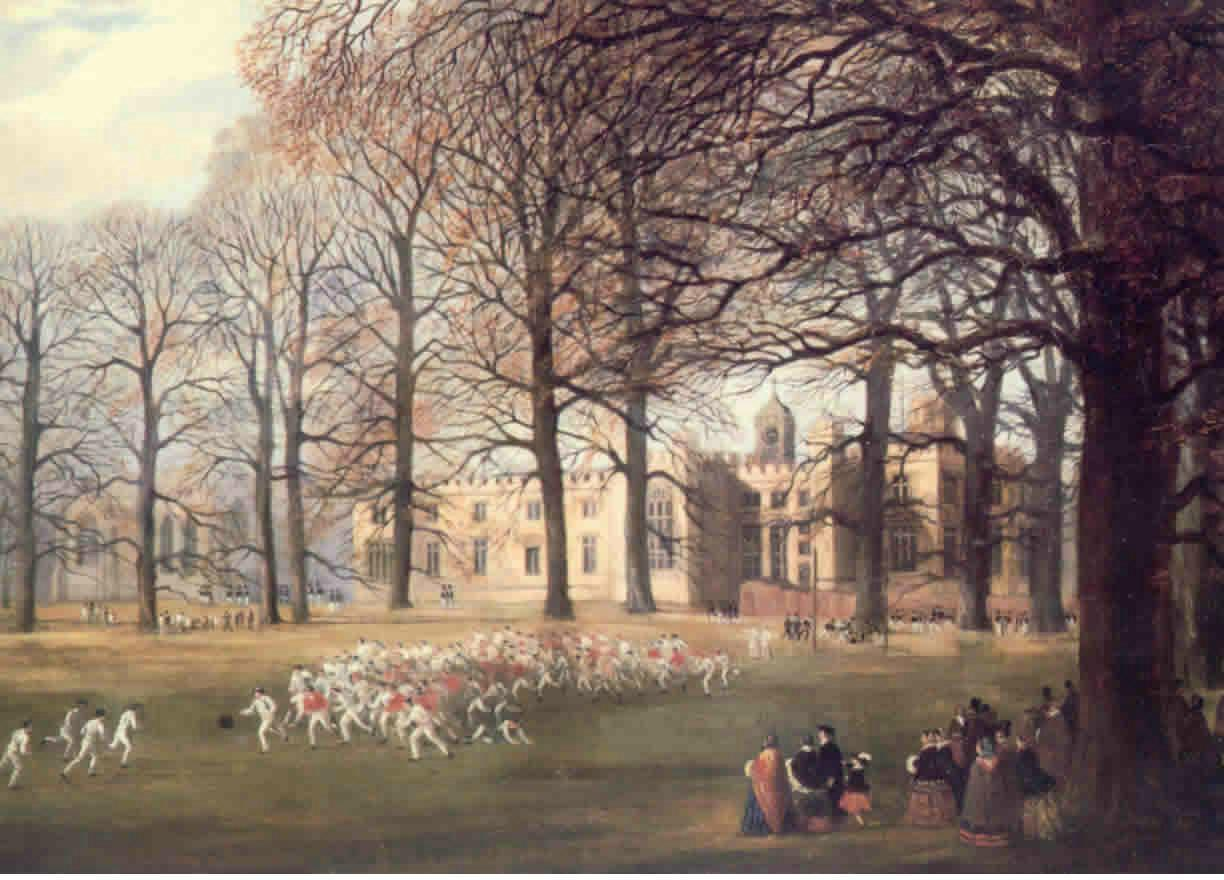
Tom Wills, founder of Australian Football, was singled out in the national press for his prowess on the football field at the Rugby School in the 1850s.

According to the AFL, the sport's origins were in England with public school football games being adopted by Australians in the 1850s leading to the creation of what is now known as Australian Football in Melbourne in the British Colony of Victoria in 1859. Several of the sport's founders were English including J. B. Thompson, William Hammersley and James Bryant, with Tom Wills having been educated at and played rugby football with the Rugby School.

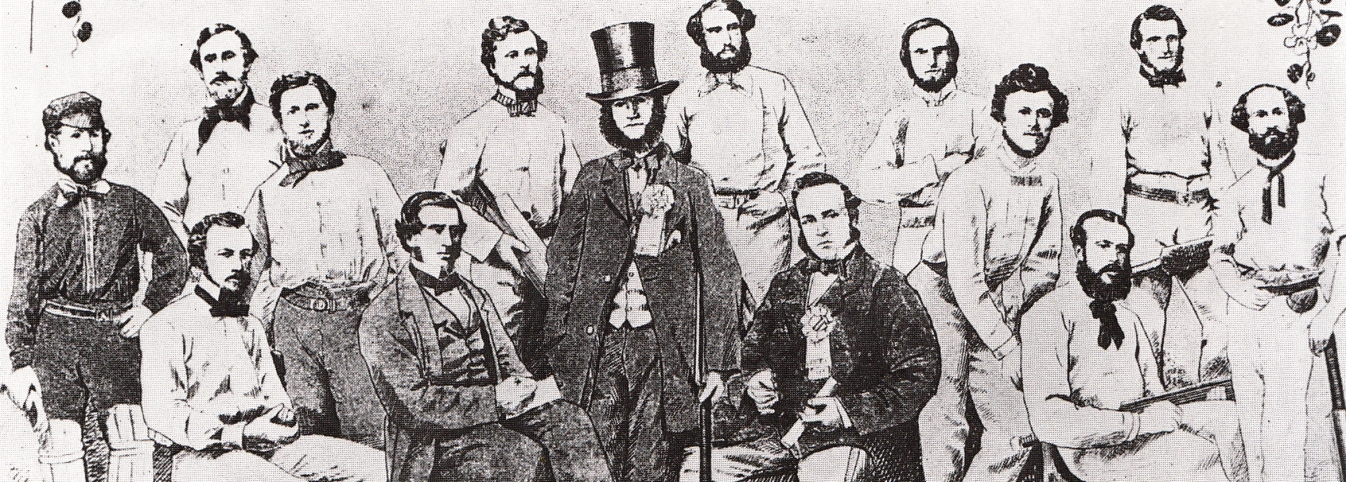
William Hammersley (standing, third from left), J. B. Thompson (seated, second from left), Jerry Bryant (standing, second from right) and Tom Wills (seated, far left), each having strong connections to England, met in 1859 to establish what is now known as Australian football.

Writing to Wills in 1871, Thompson recalled that "the Rugby, Eton, Harrow, and Winchester rules at that time (I think in 1859) came under our consideration, ... we all but unanimously agreed that regulations which suited schoolboys ... would not be patiently tolerated by grown men." The hardness of the playing fields around Melbourne also influenced their thinking. Even Wills, who favoured many rules of Rugby School football, saw the need for compromise. He wrote to his brother Horace: "Rugby was not a game for us, we wanted a winter pastime but men could be harmed if thrown on the ground so we thought differently."

While the game found its way to Ireland in the 1870s and there was also some awareness in England of the popularity of the game in Australia, it was not established locally until much later. This is primarily due to the growing popularity of locally developing football codes including rugby football and later British Association (soccer) which, like Australian Football, were also developing from public school football games.

The English were also heavily involved in the development of the code in the 1860s and 1870s. George Metcalfe was instrumental in introducing at Newington College in Colony of New South Wales in 1867, the first school in the colony to known play football in any form. the 2nd Battalion of Fourteen Foot (Buckinghamshire) played in the first known match in the Colony of Western Australia in 1868. James Henry Gardiner founded the North Melbourne Football Club in 1869 which was later instrumental to unifying football rules in the Colony of Tasmania. John Acraman and Richard Twopeny were the key players in establishing it in the Colony of South Australia.

=== Early efforts to introduce the sport ===
Between 1870 and World War I, many overseas students studied medicine in Scotland, and some went down to England to play the Australian Rules teams in that country.

A Lancashire paper from 1881 mentions a local initiative to introduce "Victorian Rules Football" to England as an alternative to rugby and Association football.

In 1883, during a visit to Australia, English journalist and rugby player Richard Twopeny wrote of the game:

A good football match in Melbourne is one of the sights of the world... The quality of the play... is much superior to anything the best English clubs can produce... there is much more 'style' about the play.

In 1884, H. C. A. Harrison, then known as the "father of Australian Football", visited London where he proposed unifying Australian rules with Rugby under a set of hybrid rules and suggested that rugby clubs adopt some of the Victorian Rules. English football officials expressed their insult at the suggestion that they "abandon their rules to oblige an Antipodean game".

Nevertheless, when first proposing a football tour of Australia and New Zealand in March 1887, James Lillywhite, Alfred Shaw and Arthur Shrewsbury posited that the best way to ensure the success of the venture would be to play under the Australian rules where the sport was most popular.

Australians studying at Edinburgh University and London University formed teams and competed in London in 1888. Spurred on by the upcoming English football team's tour of Australia, a scratch match between Edinburgh Australians and London Australians was planned to be held at Balham on 14 April 1888. However the match was postponed citing lack of player numbers and suitability of the venue. It was finally played on 26 May 1888 at Balham, London won 4 goals to 2. There was little interest in the match outside of the Australian expat community. However the game was poorly organised and the selected ground was so out of the way that most spectators failed to find it, proving to be lost opportunity to promote the game. A return match was played on the same ground on the 30th May resulting in a draw. The match drew considerable praise in UK newspapers such as the Times and the Scotsman.

=== British tours to Australia (1888–1914) ===
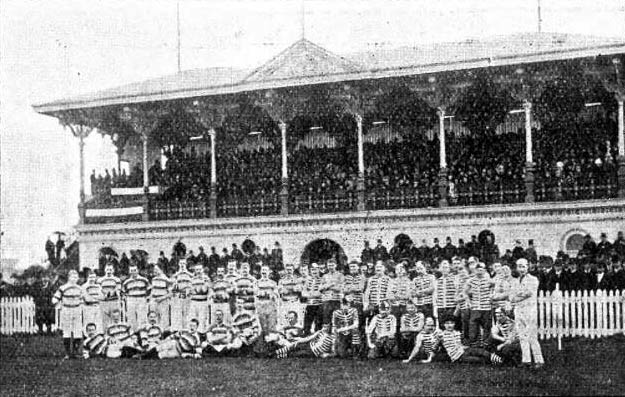
The touring British Lions in 1888 before a match against the South Melbourne Football Club

Australian rules football was played by a British representative rugby team which toured Australia in 1888. The team arrived in Hobart, Tasmania on 18 April. They attended a social function with the Southern Tasmanian Football Association, before going to New Zealand for a series of rugby matches.

After they returned to Australia they again trained in Australian rules in Sydney, before leaving for Victoria in mid-June. The tour included 19 matches. They played against several of the stronger football clubs from Melbourne including the Carlton Football Club, South Melbourne Football Club, Essendon Football Club, Fitzroy Football Club and Port Melbourne Football Club. Additionally, they played against some strong regional Victorian clubs including two teams from the city of Ballarat: Ballarat Football Club and Ballarat Imperial Football Club, as well as two teams from the city of Bendigo: Bendigo Football Club and Sandhurst Football Club as well as playing against clubs from other regional towns including the Castlemaine Football Club, Maryborough Football Club, Horsham Football Club and Kyneton Football Club.

The team also played against several of the stronger South Australian teams, including South Adelaide Football Club, Port Adelaide Football Club, Adelaide Football Club (no connection to the later Adelaide club), Norwood Football Club. The only club from outside of Victoria or South Australia which played against them was the Maitland Football Club (from the Hunter Valley in New South Wales). The British team won six matches, including a win over Port Adelaide at Adelaide Oval on 10 July 1888, and drew one.

The reigning Victorian premiers, Carlton defeated Great Britain at the MCG 14.17 to 3.8. At this stage goals and points were recorded but only goals counted in the score; for example, when Great Britain played Castlemaine under very heavy conditions they kicked 1 goal 2 points and the locals kicked 1 goal 4 points, but the match was declared a draw. Great Britain also played 35 games of rugby, making a total of 54 games in 21 weeks. A star of the team's Australian rules games was Andrew Stoddart, who captained the team for part of its tour and also captained England in cricket.

The 1888 tour had been organised by the English cricketer Arthur Shrewsbury but his involvement with Australian Rules football did not end there. He planned to have an Australian team sent to the United Kingdom to play a series of demonstration matches and to that end he looked to Scotland where he had identified possible opponents. Shrewsbury's plans are outlined in his correspondence with Alfred Shaw and Turner, the Nottingham Cricket Club Secretary.

=== First Competitions ===
Shrewsbury suggested that the 'Edinburgh Australians' team at Edinburgh University should travel down to England to meet the Australian team in a series of demonstration matches in Lancashire and Yorkshire. Unfortunately his bold plan did not eventuate as the authorities in Australia aborted the venture and a possible expansion of Australian Rules in the UK was lost.

In 1894, a dramatic costume football match was played at the East Melbourne Cricket Ground involving prominent English celebrities Jennie Lee, Wallace Brownlow and Harry Musgrove.

There were reports from Australia that the game was being played in England between two clubs in 1903 and in 1904. By 1906 there were three clubs holding regular competition two of which were in London. The Oxford University Australian Rules Football Club was founded in 1906.

As early as 1911 the game was being played regularly at Oxford. The Cambridge University Australian Rules Football Club is believed to have been founded around 1911. In 1911 Oxford University captained by Alfred Clemens defeated Cambridge University captained by Ron Larking 13.9 (87) to 5.12 (42). In 1914, H C A Harrison reported that the game was being played regularly at both Oxford and Cambridge universities though few records exist of contests between 1911 and 1921.

=== World War I ===
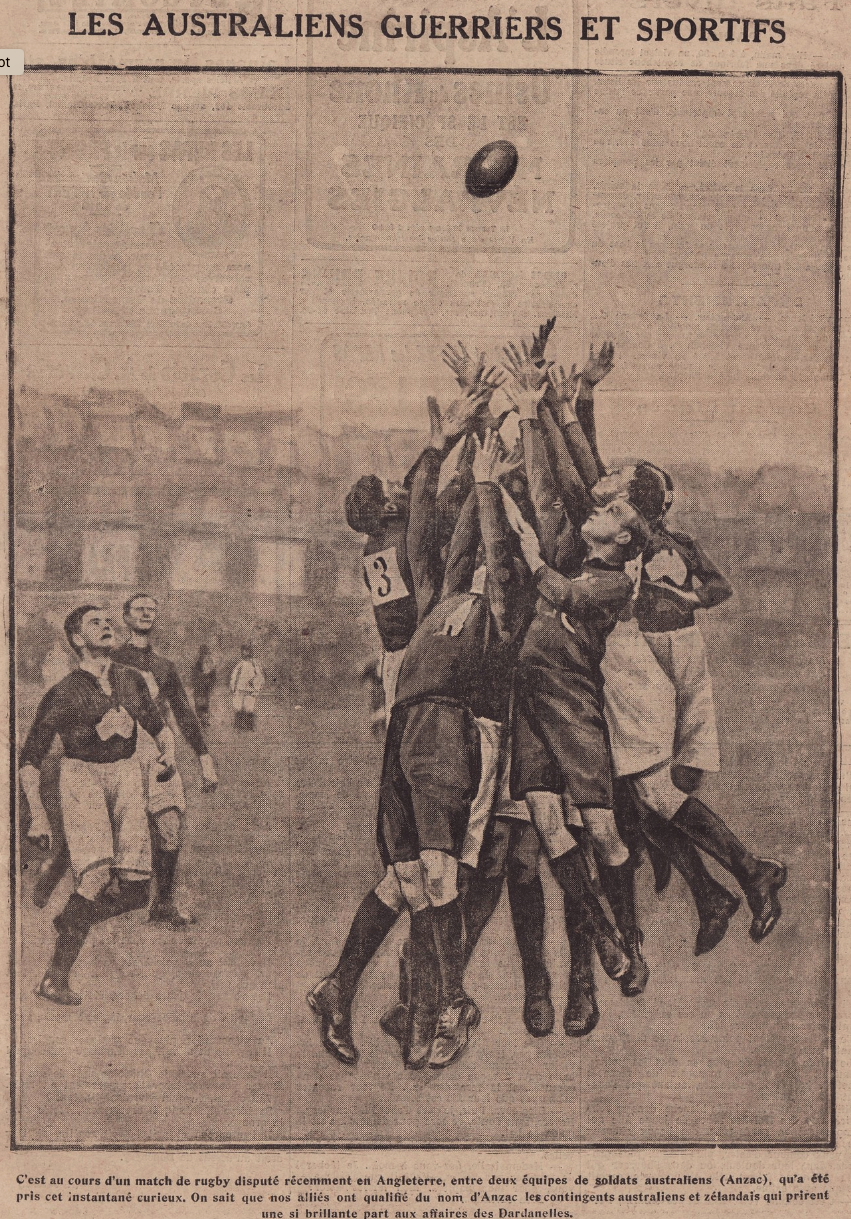
Action from the Pioneer Exhibition Game in London. (From Excelsior, 20 November 1916.)

In 1915 a Victoria vs South Australia match was played at Portland Canteen ground at Weymouth, Dorset.

In 1916, one of the highest profile matches in the history of the game outside of Australia occurred when a match was held at the Queen's Club in London between Australian Army teams, representing the Combined Training Units and the 3rd Division, in which many senior Australian rules footballers from all over Australia took part. The match drew a large crowd and significant press coverage.

In 1917 HMAS Australia's Australian Football team played against a team of soldiers in London which drew significant attendance and interest. In November 1917, the Australian army and navy played a rugby match against each other in London, however the seconds played a match under Australian rules.

As a celebration of Australia Day January 1918, a match was held at Cambridge between London Headquarters and Australian Cadets, with London winning 80 to 63.

However, the end of World War I saw the game outside of the universities go into hiatus.

=== Varsity matches between Oxford and Cambridge ===
After the war, in 1921, the Oxford University–Cambridge University Varsity match between expatriate Australian students became an annual contest. This game is still played, and it is the longest-running Australian rules fixture outside Australia. The match is an official Varsity competition. Over the years, some distinguished Australians to have played in the match include Mike Fitzpatrick, Chris Maxwell, Joe Santamaria, Sir Rod Eddington and Andrew Michelmore.

=== Second World War matches ===
The AIF played a match in 1940 between the "Impossibles" and the "Improbables".

When the RMS Moreton Bay returned to England after 1941 it played in advertised matches at Portsmouth.

RAAF (Sunderland) vs RAF Mount Batten was played in 1943 in Plymouth. In November of the same year, a game was played in Sussex between No.11 Personnel despatch and Reception centre team based in Brighton vs RAAF Headquarters from London.

Teams representing RAAF, Headquarters vs Sunderland, met in Hyde Park in 1944 in front of a sizeable crowd. Headquarters defeated Sunderland 12.7 (79) to 5.4 (34).

In 1945, HMAS Australia defeated RAAF at Dulwich 11.12 to 10.5.

In 1948, Australia's champion axemen team announced its plans to introduce Australian rules football into England.

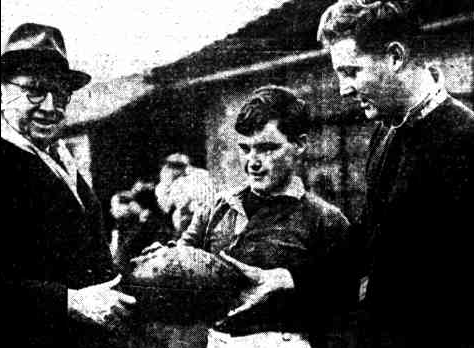
Australia's High Commissioner in London with the captains of the Oxford and Cambridge teams in 1949

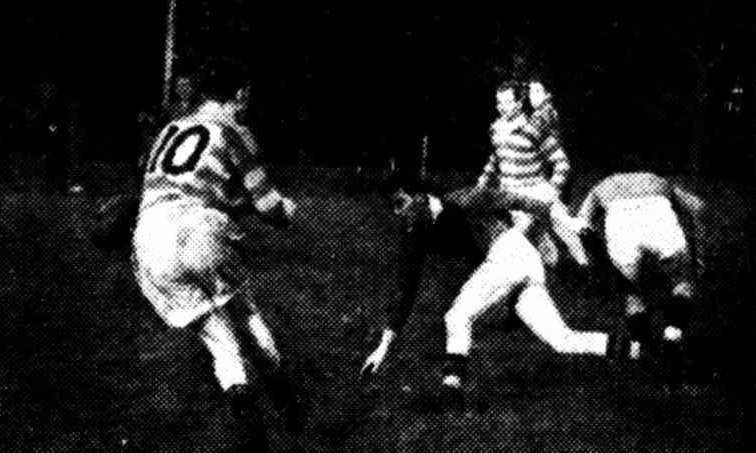
Action from an Australian rules match facilitated by Rosslyn Park Rugby club featuring HMAS Vengeance and the "Wombats" (in the stripes) at Old Deer Park in 1952

In 1952, a match was played at Rosslyn Park F.C. in South West London between HMAS Vengeance and English-Australians ("the Wombats"). The Wombats also organised a match at Cambridge.

=== The first local league ===
In 1967, Australian expatriates including Michael Cyril Hall and Ted Ford attempted to organise Australian Football in London. Ted engaged high-profile expatriate Australians including Rolf Harris, Alan Freeman, Barry Humphries, Neil Hawke, Keith Miller and former Australian prime minister Sir Robert Menzies to support the venture and raise publicity for it. Ford organised a charity match was played in Regent's Park in London, between local club Kensington Demons and established out of town club Oxford University. Athol Guy (who had played VFL reserves with St Kilda) also made a special appearance as a player. The match also featured England's first all-women's match between Aussie Girls and Wild Colonial Girls as a curtain raiser. The match attracted a crowd of 1,000 spectators. A follow-up match between Earl's Court Magpies and Australian Dentists attracted 700 spectators. By May 7 established local teams were ready to form a local league these teams included: Australian Dentists, Australian Navy, Oxford University, Cambridge University, Kensington Demons, Earls Court Magpies and London House. In July, Royal Australian Navy (RAN) personnel played against a combined side drawn from the Earls Court Magpies; Kensington Demons and Australian Dentists in front of a crowd of 1,200 at Regent's Park. RAN personnel would go on to play against local school sides and local rugby clubs.

After some time finding its roots, the Australian National Football League (UK) was formed which by 1970 had six teams, Victorians; Rest of Australia; Portsmouth Naval Base; Plymouth Naval Base; London Gaelic Football Club and Hampstead Rugby Club with matches played in the summer. The later inclusion of two English rugby sides was helping them keep fit in the off-season. Later clubs to play in the league included the Kensington Demons, Earls Court Magpies, Oxford University Blues, Australian Dentists and Australian Navy (based in Portsmouth).

In 1972, the first exhibition match of the VFL was played at The Oval in London as part of the Carlton Football Club 1972 preseason World Tour. The match attracted 9,000 in a carnival-like atmosphere. However, the arrival of the spectacle of elite-level VFL also saw the end of the game at the grassroots in England with no further organised competition.

=== The VFL/AFL annual exhibition ===
Between 1987 and 2006, VFL/AFL exhibition matches had become an almost annual event, but the only game since then being in 2012. With a large number of ex-patriate Australians, interest in the game grew, and small crowds of up to 10,000 were in attendance for the event in some years. Interest and crowds grew further with the change of the VFL to the Australian Football League. Highlights during this time included large crowds for and Australian Football League match between West Coast Eagles and Collingwood in 1997, with an attendance of about 14,000, and a match between Richmond and Essendon in 2002 that drew about 13,000.

=== The British Australian Rules Football League: 1989–Present ===
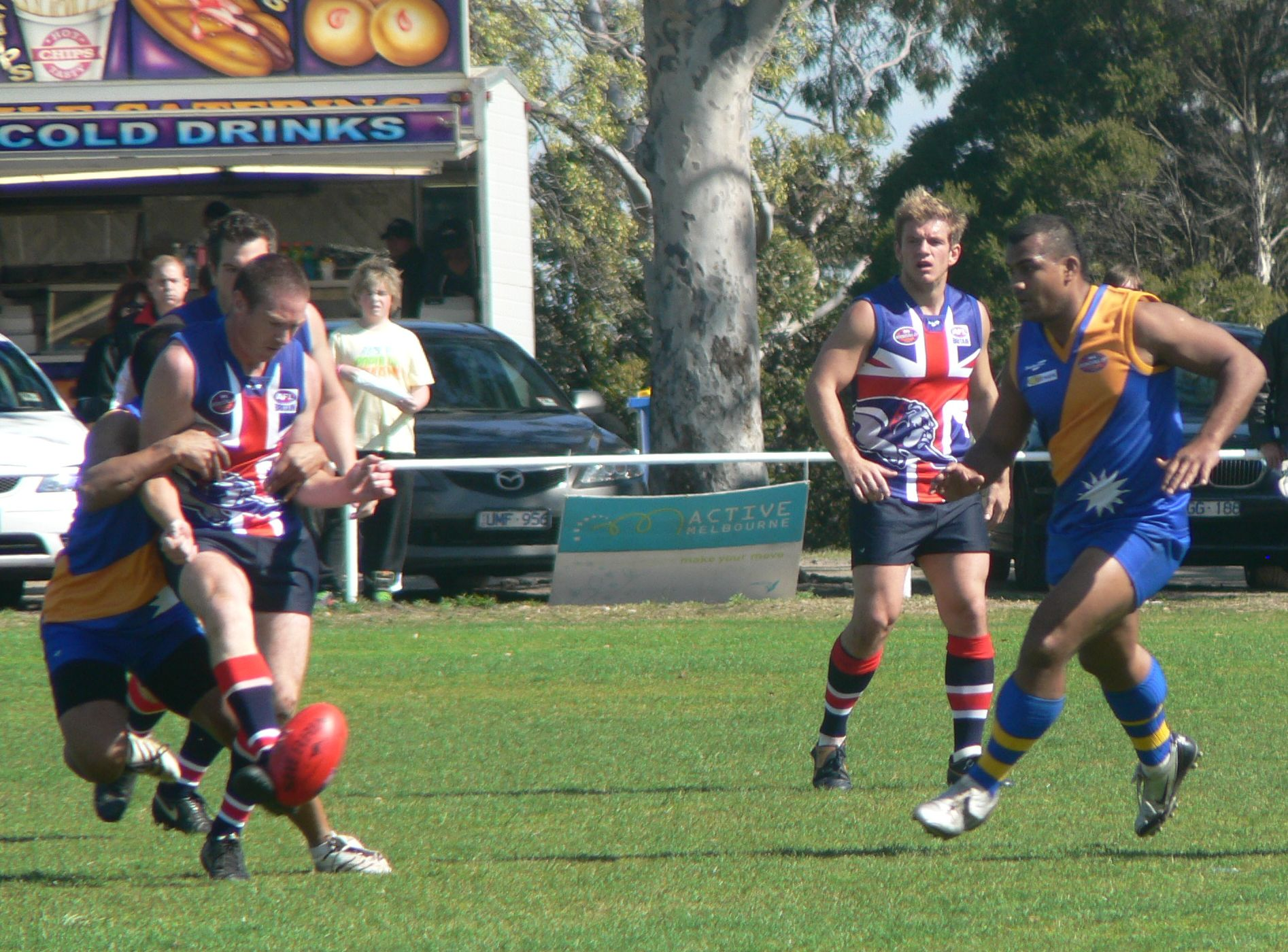
British Bulldogs player kicks despite a tackle from Nauruan opponent during the 2008 International Cup

In 1989, the British Australian rules football League (BARFL) was formed by John Jelly, Andrew Zweck, Steve Poulsen and others. Serious competition began. A schools program was launched in 1991. One of the key people in the establishment of the competition was former professional Australian player Darren Ogier, who helped introduce a balancing rule whereby at least half of the club's on-field players must be non-Australian. As the competition became more popular, results were reported in Australia. From 1992, the AFL began contributing AUD $6,000 a year to the league; however, it withdrew its financial contributions in 1994, expressing a preference for grants to be spent on junior programs and school projects instead of the senior competition. Despite the lack of AFL support, local BARFL Grand Finals become a large event attracting attendances in the thousands, including a record crowd of 1,500 in 1999.

In 2002 a national team represented Great Britain at the Australian Football International Cup for the first time, finishing the tournament in 6th place. 2005 saw the British Bulldogs again compete in the International Cup, again finishing 6th overall.

Following the 2005 International Cup, promising 22-year-old British Bulldog Luke Matias began playing with the Port Melbourne Football Club in the Victorian Football League.

Also in 2005, the first Western Derby to be played outside of Australia, the West Coast Eagles v. Fremantle game was played as a pre-season test at The Oval in London, drawing a record crowd of 18,884.

=== Junior Development programs ===
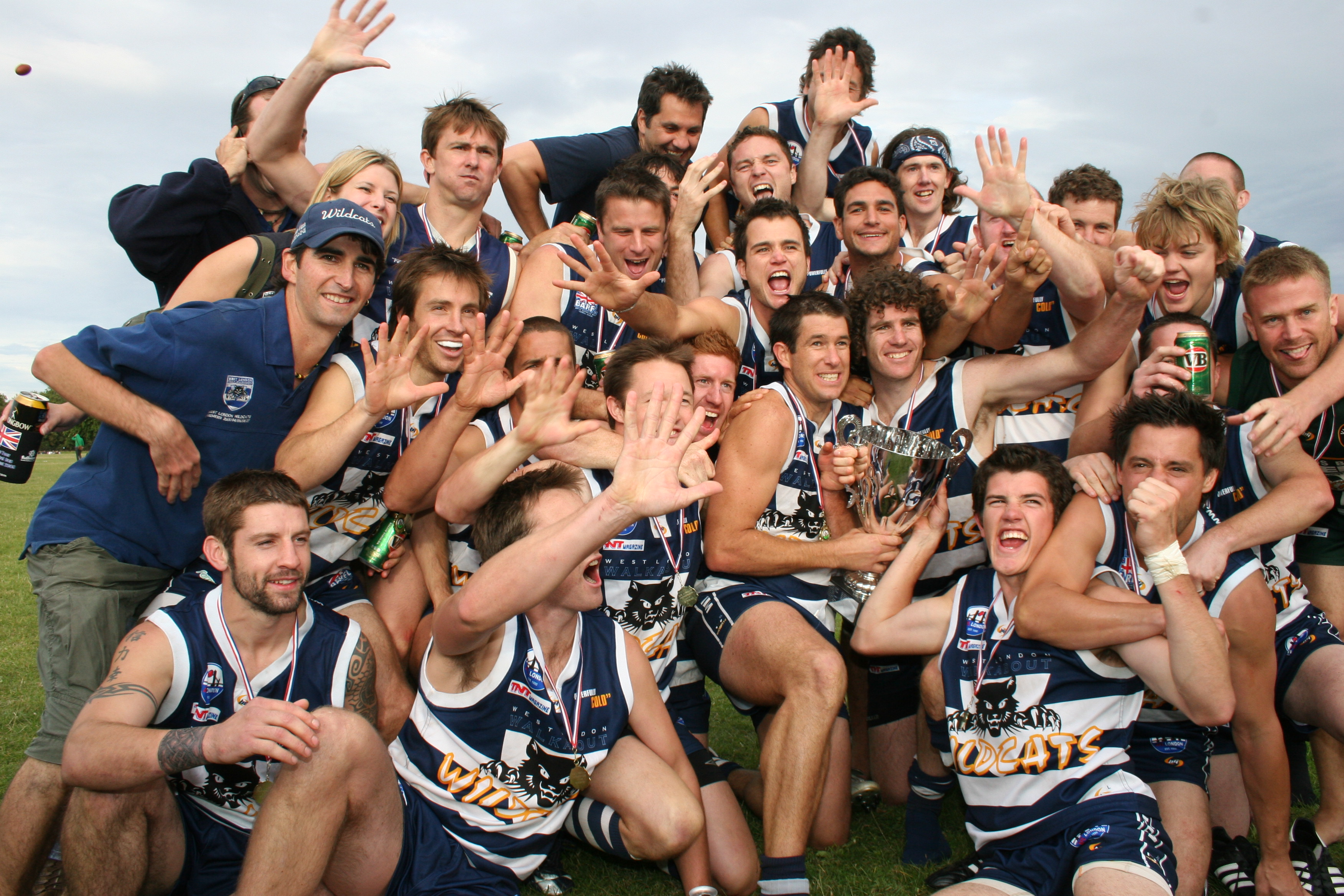
West London Wildcats 2008 British competition premiers

In 2005 the first junior development program, Aussie Rules Schools, commenced. The program, co-ordinated by the new development body Aussie Rules UK, part of Aussie Rules International was kicked off. This project has seen up to 10 English schools adopt Aussie Rules as part of the school curriculum to combat obesity. Juniors teams have competed at the London Youth Games.

2006 was a big year for Aussie Rules in England, with the admission of new clubs in Manchester, Middlesbrough and Thanet.

On 17 September 2006 history was made in Denmark when the England Dragonslayers took on the Denmark Vikings in Europe's first fully-fledged international junior Aussie Rules match. England claimed the King Canute Cup, with England 6.10(46) defeating Denmark 0.6(6).

In July 2007, the AFL announced that the annual London exhibition match was likely to be abandoned for the year, after only the Western Bulldogs had expressed interest.

In a first in 2007, the GB Bulldogs including several past and future England players, soundly defeated Ireland in Dublin 11.15(81) to 2.9(21).

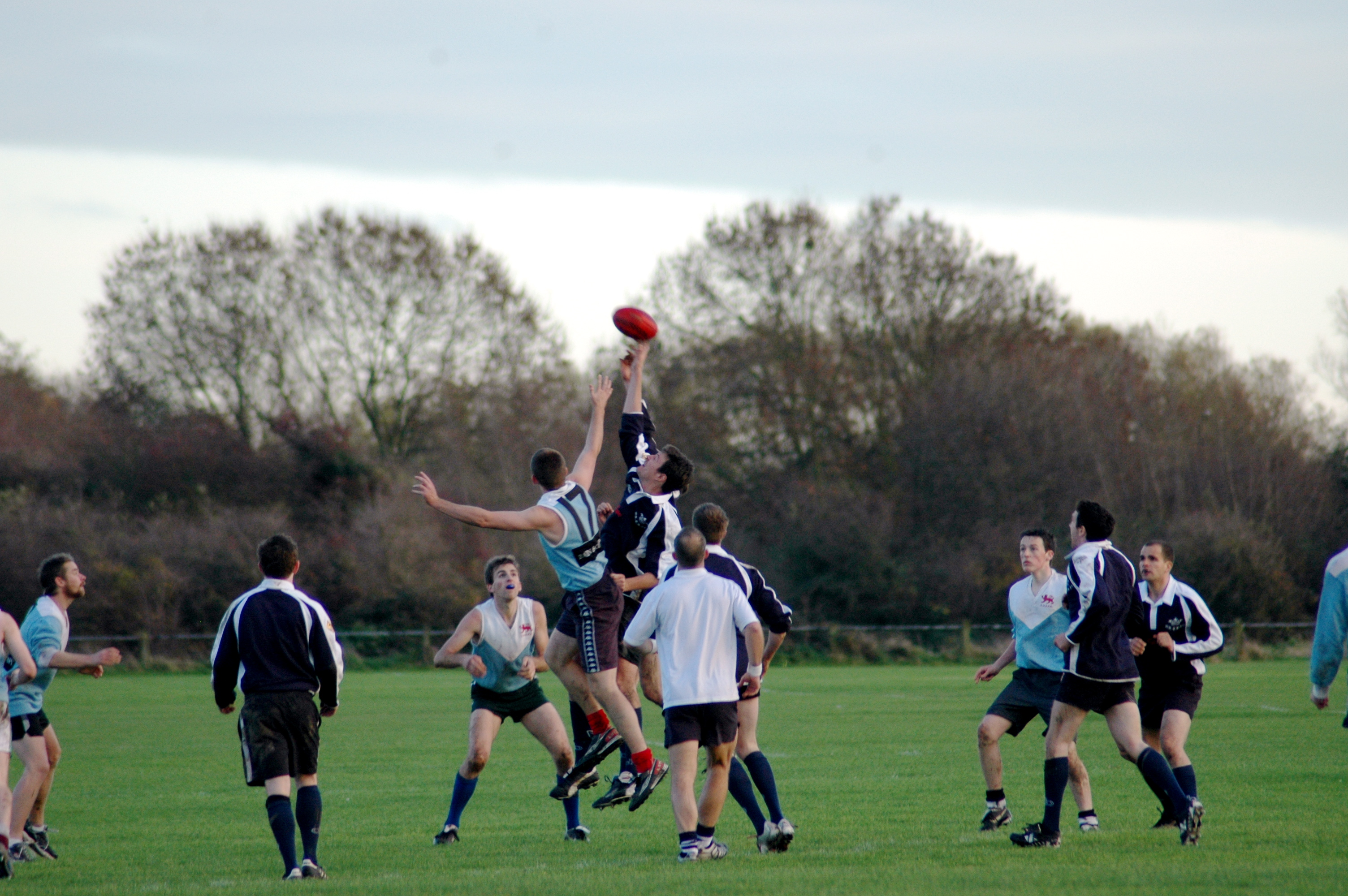
Cambridge and Oxford Universities contest centre bounce in 2008

=== AFL Britain ===
In 2008, a resolution to the divide between the two competing leagues saw a single national body, AFL Britain form, which formally affiliated to the AFL. The BARFL was dissolved and became AFL London, while regional leagues including the Scottish Australian Rules Football League and the Welsh Australian Rules Football League affiliated with the new national body.

=== AFL England ===
In 2012, AFL England was formed as the national governing body for Australian rules football in England, separate to AFL Scotland and AFL Wales.

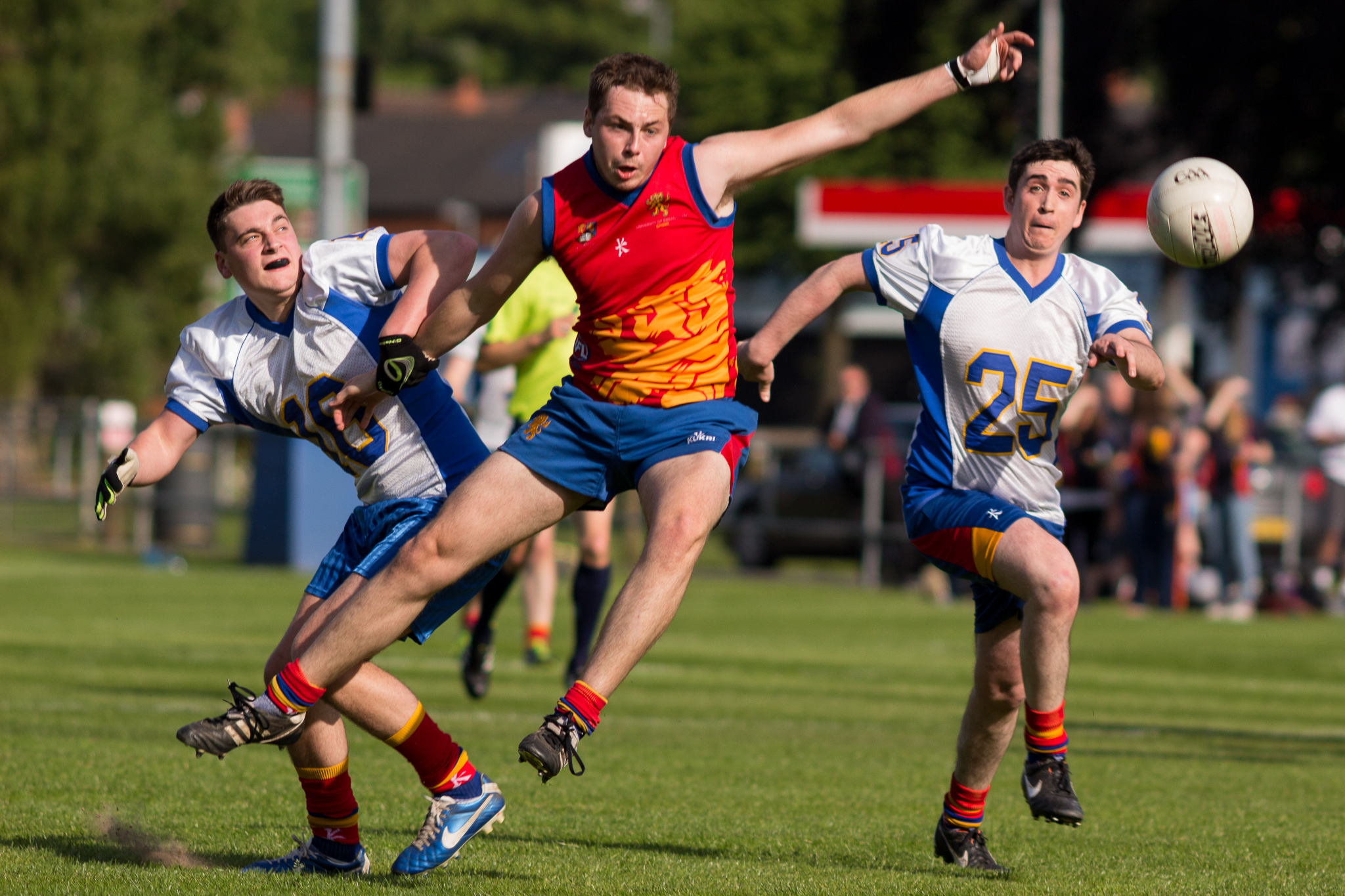
International Rules hybrid match being played at the University of Birmingham 2014

== Participation ==
In 2004, there were a total of around 435 senior players across 18 clubs in England. The local league has a higher number of ex-patriate Australians compared to other countries that participate in the sport, however the league recently put in place caps on the number of expatriate players in certain divisions to improve the mix and encourage more local players.

By the end of 2007, the game had experienced substantial growth due to the placement of permanent development officers. AFL International Census figures indicate over 3,600 participants

== Audience ==
=== Television ===
Australian rules football is regularly shown on TNT Sports.

=== Attendance records ===
==== Local competitions ====
1,500 (1999). BARFL Grand Final. West London Wildcats vs Wandsworth Demons. London

==== Exhibition match ====
18,884 (2005). West Coast v. Fremantle (The Oval, London)

== National teams ==
AFL England currently manages four national teams. The Great Britain Bulldogs and Great Britain Swans compete every three years at the International Cup in Melbourne. The squad is made up of players mainly from the London clubs, however they are often joined by players competing in Australia. In 2017 the Bulldogs finished sixth, their joint-highest finish, while in their maiden year the Swans finished third, defeating the United States 5.2 (32) to 4.1 (25)

The English teams are known as the England Dragonslayers and the England Vixens. Both teams won the AFL Europe Euro Cup in 2017. In 2018, the Vixens finished runners-up

== Clubs ==
=== Open ===
==== London ====
| Club | Years in competition | Conference Team | Social Team | Previous names |
|---|---|---|---|---|
| Earls Court Kangaroos | 1990–97 | | | Esher Kangaroos (1992), Firkin Roos (1996–97) |
| North London Lions | 1990- | Regent's Park Lions | Bounds Green | |
| Putney Magpies | 1999- | Hammersmith Magpies | Fulham Magpies | London Gryphons (1999–2003), merged with London Collingwood Supporters' Group |
| Lea Valley Saints | 1990–96 | | | |
| London Swans | 1991- | City Swans | | Sussex Swans (1991–2007), name still used for their ARUK Southern team |
| Thames Valley Magpies | 1990–91 | | | |
| South East London Giants | 2008- | | | Dulwich Dragons (2008–2011) |
| Wandsworth Demons | 1990- | Clapham Demons | South London Demons | |
| West London Wildcats | 1990- | Shepherds Bush Raiders | Ealing Emus | |
| Wimbledon Hawks | 1990- | Fulham Hawks | | London Hawks (1990–94) |

==== Regional England ====
| Club | Leagues competed in | Other names |
|---|---|---|
| Birmingham Bears | ARUK Central Division (2009) | |
| Birmingham Crows | BARFL (1993–94) | |
| Bournemouth Demons | ARUK Southern Division (2007–11) | |
| Brighton Black Swans | ARUK Southern Division (2007–08) | |
| Bristol Dockers | BARFL (1991–2002), BARFL Regional (2003–06), AFL London Social League (2007-) | Bristol Bears (1991–96) |
| Chippenham Redbacks | ARUK Southern Division (2008–09) | |
| Doncaster Saints | BARFL Regional (2003–04) | |
| Durham Saints | ARUK Northern Division (2007–09) | Durham Swans (2007–08) |
| East Midland Eagles | BARFL (1990–96) | |
| Gateshead Miners | ARUK Northern Division (2009) | |
| Guildford Crows | ARUK Southern Division (2011) | |
| Hartlepool Dockers | ARUK Northern Division (2007–09) | |
| Huddersfield Rams | ARUK Central Division (2009) | |
| Leeds Bombers | ARUK Central Division (2009) | |
| Liverpool Blues | BARFL (1993–94) | |
| Liverpool Eagles | ARUK Central Division (2009) | |
| Manchester Mosquitoes | BARFL Regional (2006), AFL London Social League (2007–09) | |
| Middlesbrough Hawks | SARFL (2006), ARUK Northern Division (2007–09) | |
| Newcastle Centurions | ARUK Northern Division (2007–09) | |
| Nottingham Scorpions | BARFL Regional (2004–06), AFL London Social League (2007–09) | |
| Plymouth Lions | | Plymouth Seagulls (2011) |
| Portsmouth Pirates | ARUK Southern Division (2009) | |
| Reading Kangaroos | BARFL Regional (2003–06), AFL London Social League (2007–09) | |
| Sheffield Thunder | ARUK Central Division (2009) | |
| Southampton Titans | ARUK Southern Division (2007–09) | |
| St Helens Miners | BARFL (2002–04) | Northwestern Miners (2004) |
| Sussex Swans | BARFL (1991-), ARUK Southern Division (2007–09) | |
| Swindon Devils | BARFL Regional (2004–06), WARFL (2007) | |
| Thanet Bombers | BARFL Regional (2006), ARUK Southern Division (2007) | Thanet Bombardiers (2006) |
| University of Birmingham Lions | National University League (2009-) | |

=== Juniors ===
- Clapham Cubs

== Players ==
=== Men's ===
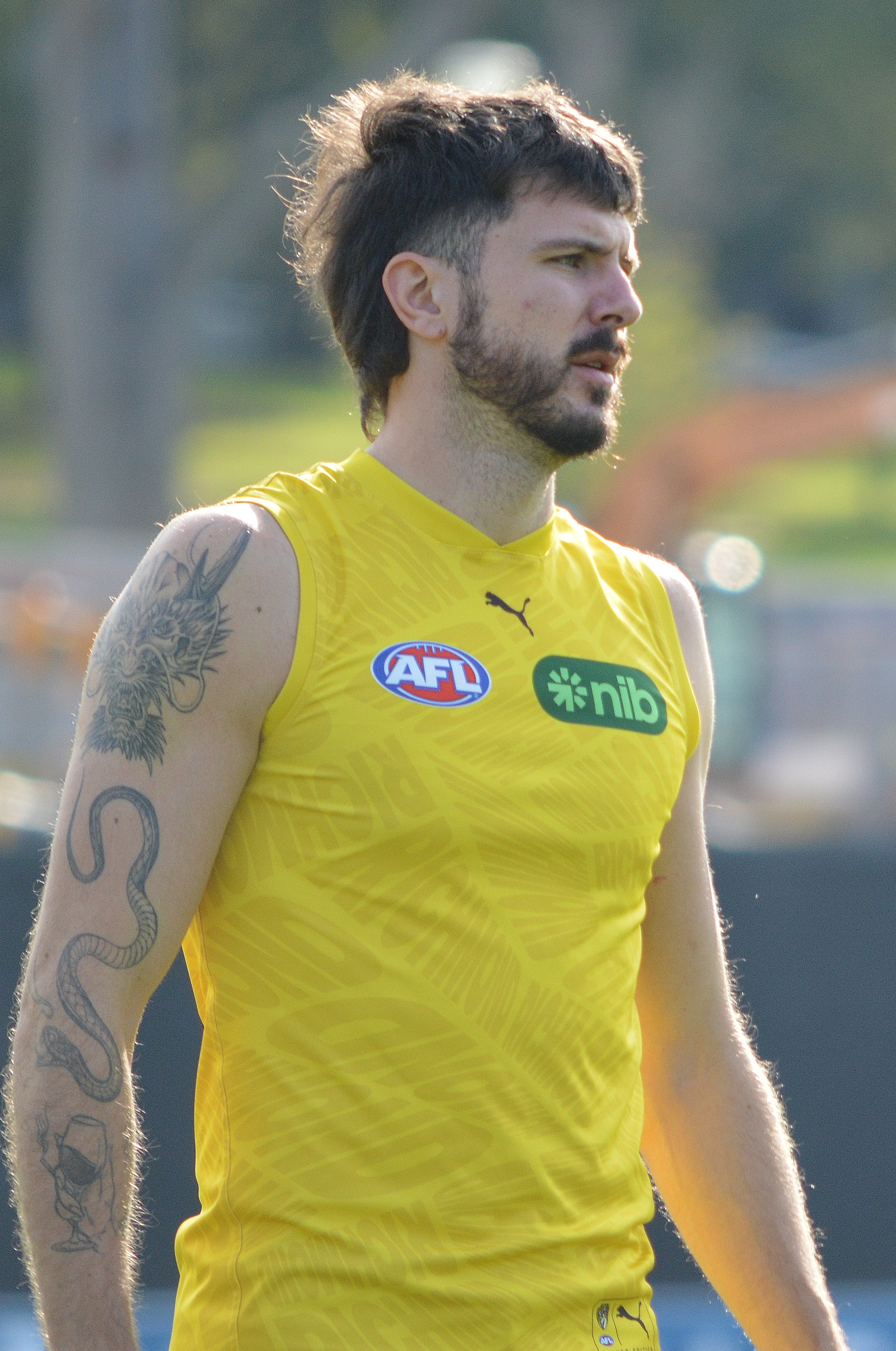
Oliver Hayes-Brown playing for Richmond in 2026

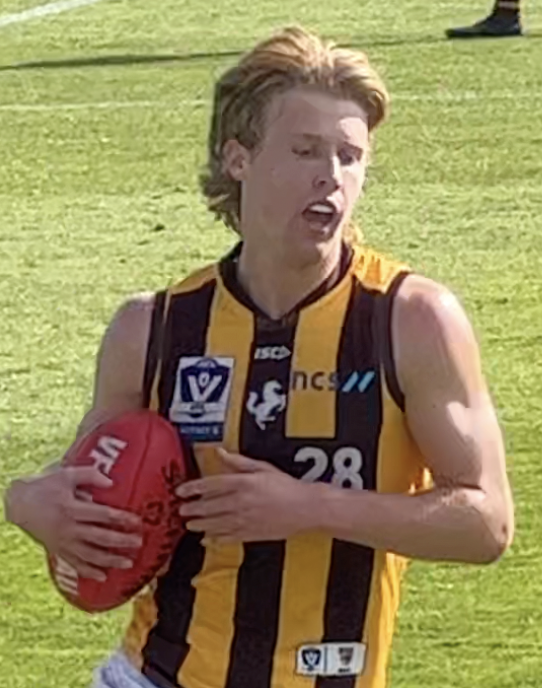
Cameron Mackenzie playing for the Box Hill Football Club in 2023

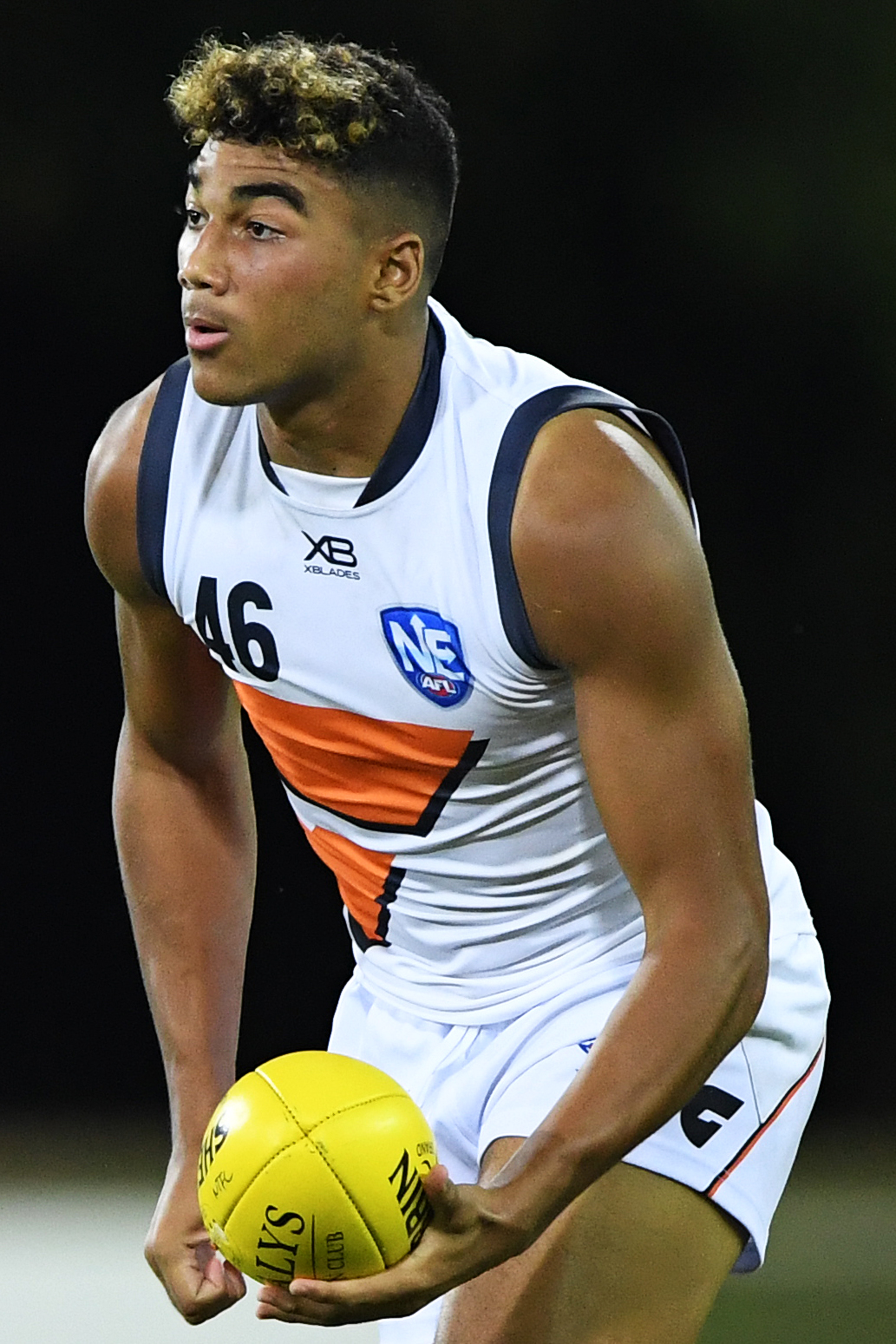
Callum M. Brown playing for Greater Western Sydney in 2019

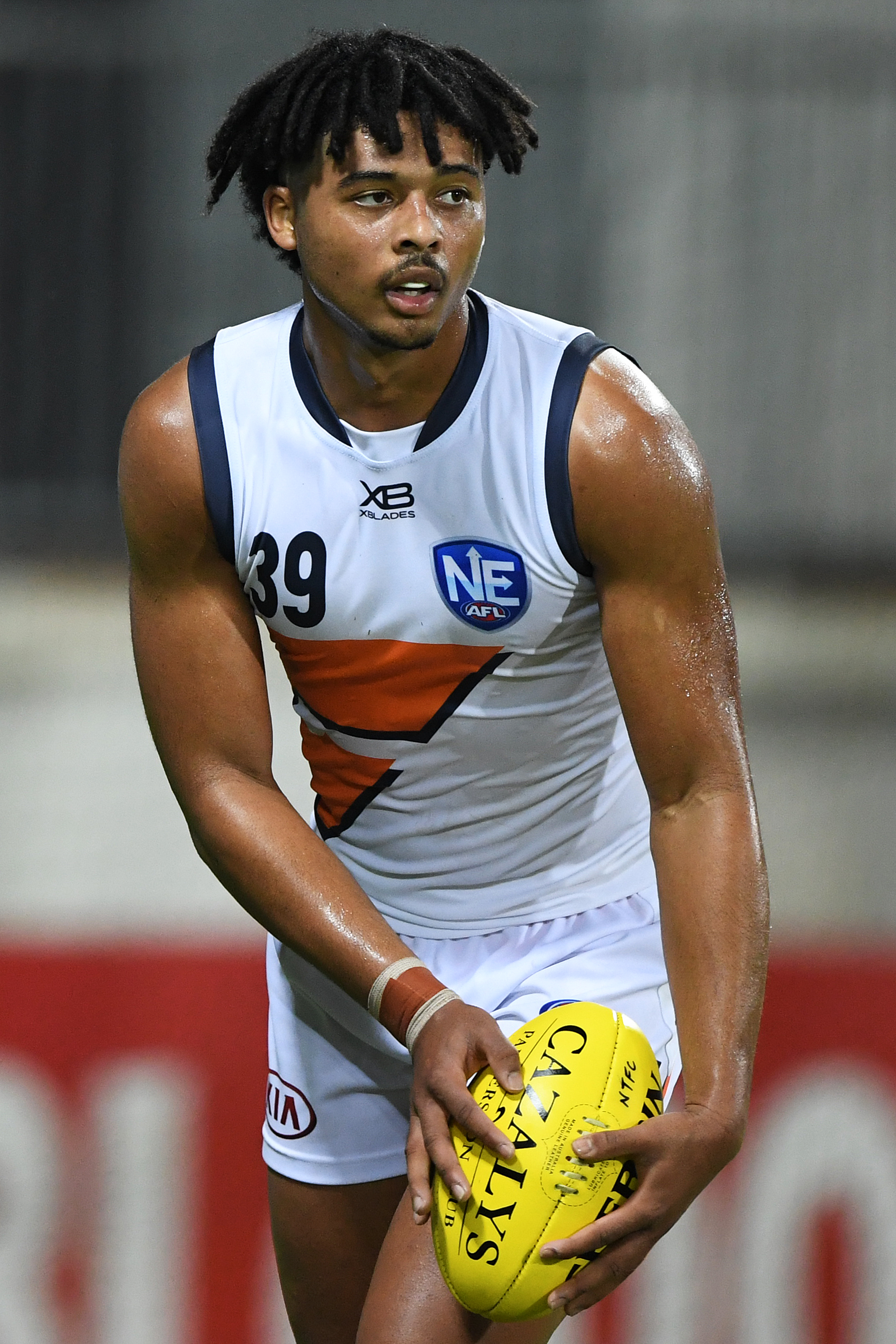
Connor Idun playing for Greater Western Sydney in 2019

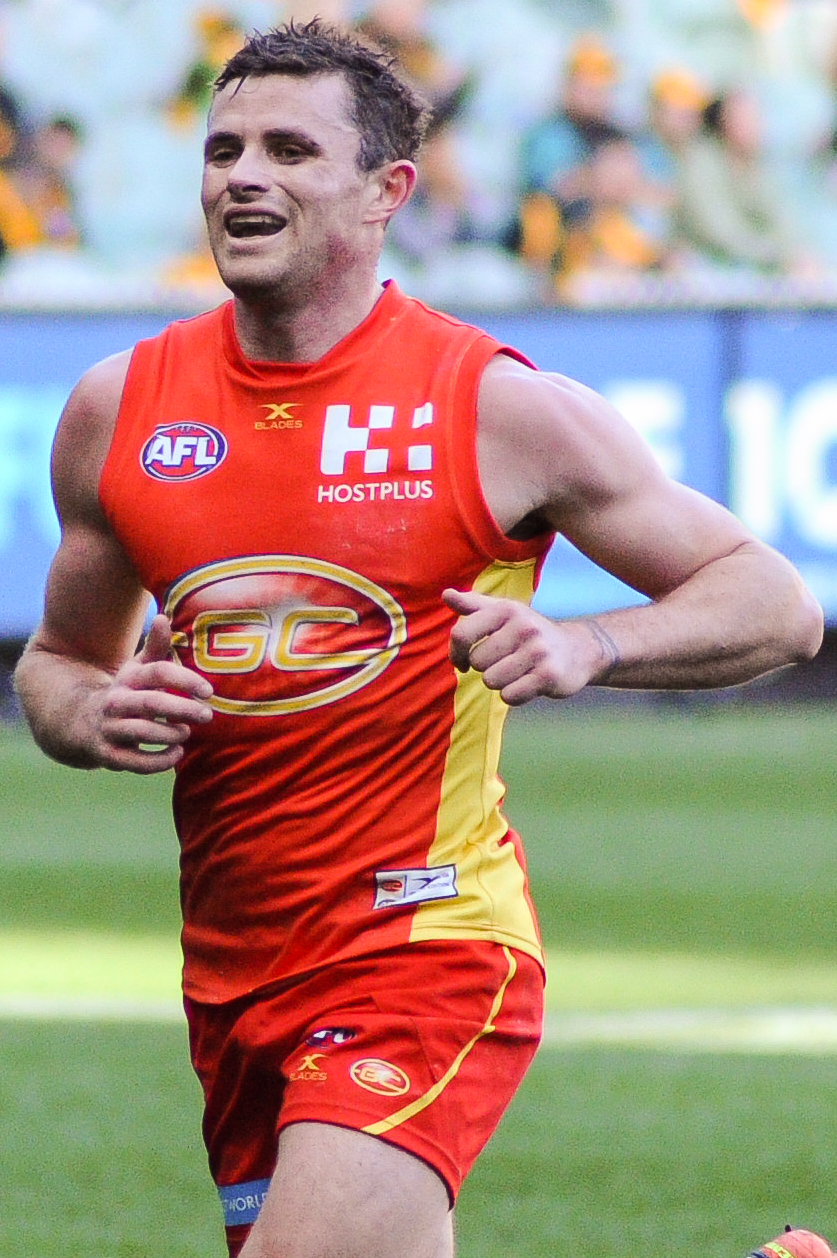
Pearce Hanley playing for the Gold Coast in 2017

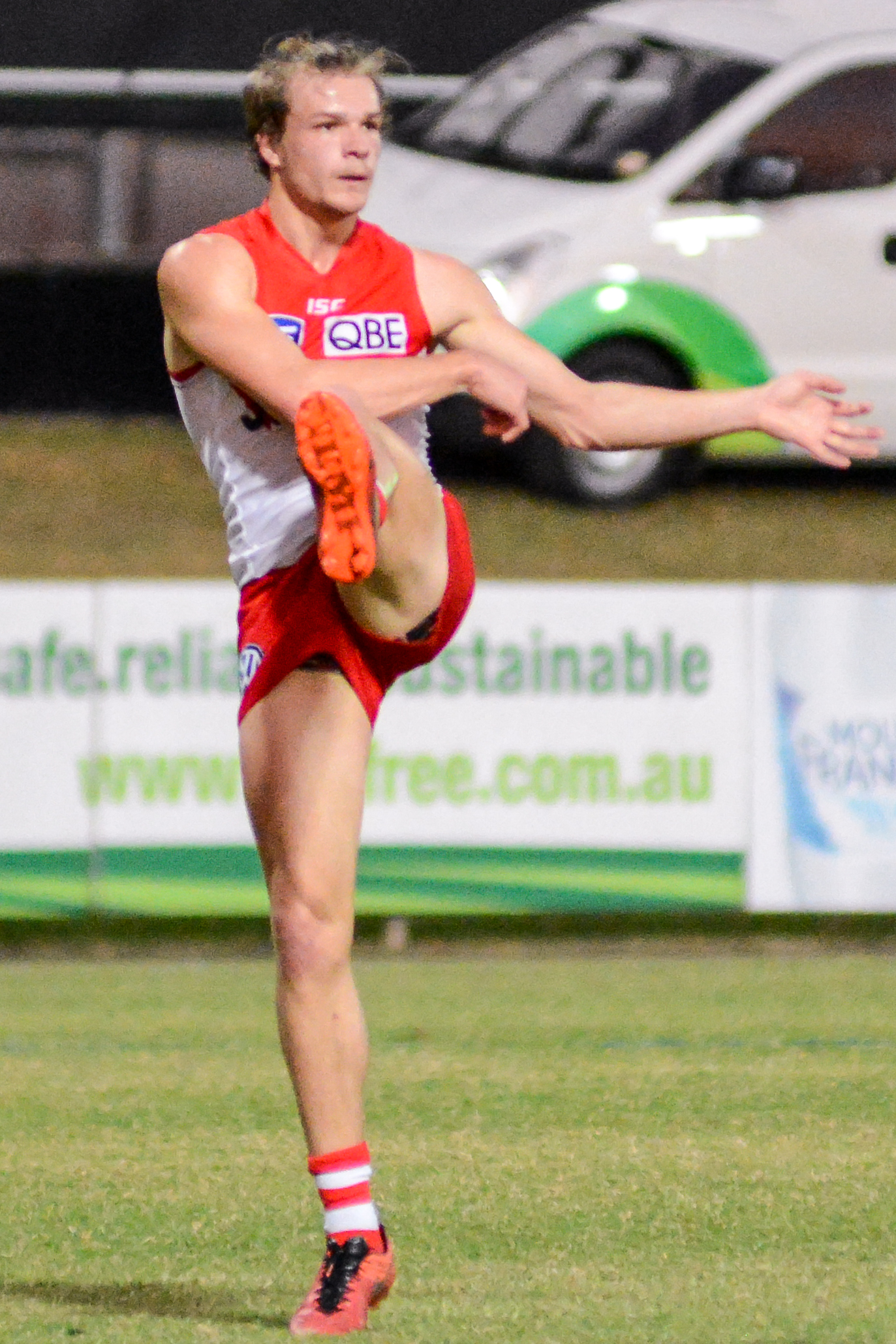
Brandon Jack playing for Sydney in 2016

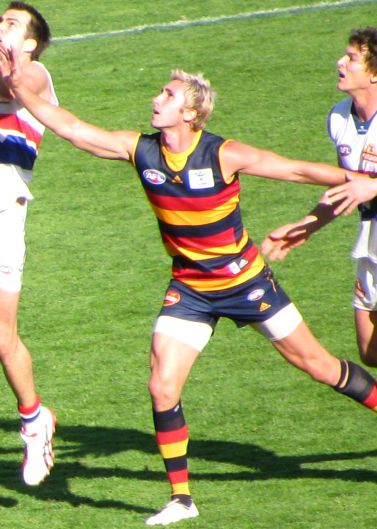
Brad Moran playing for Adelaide in 2009

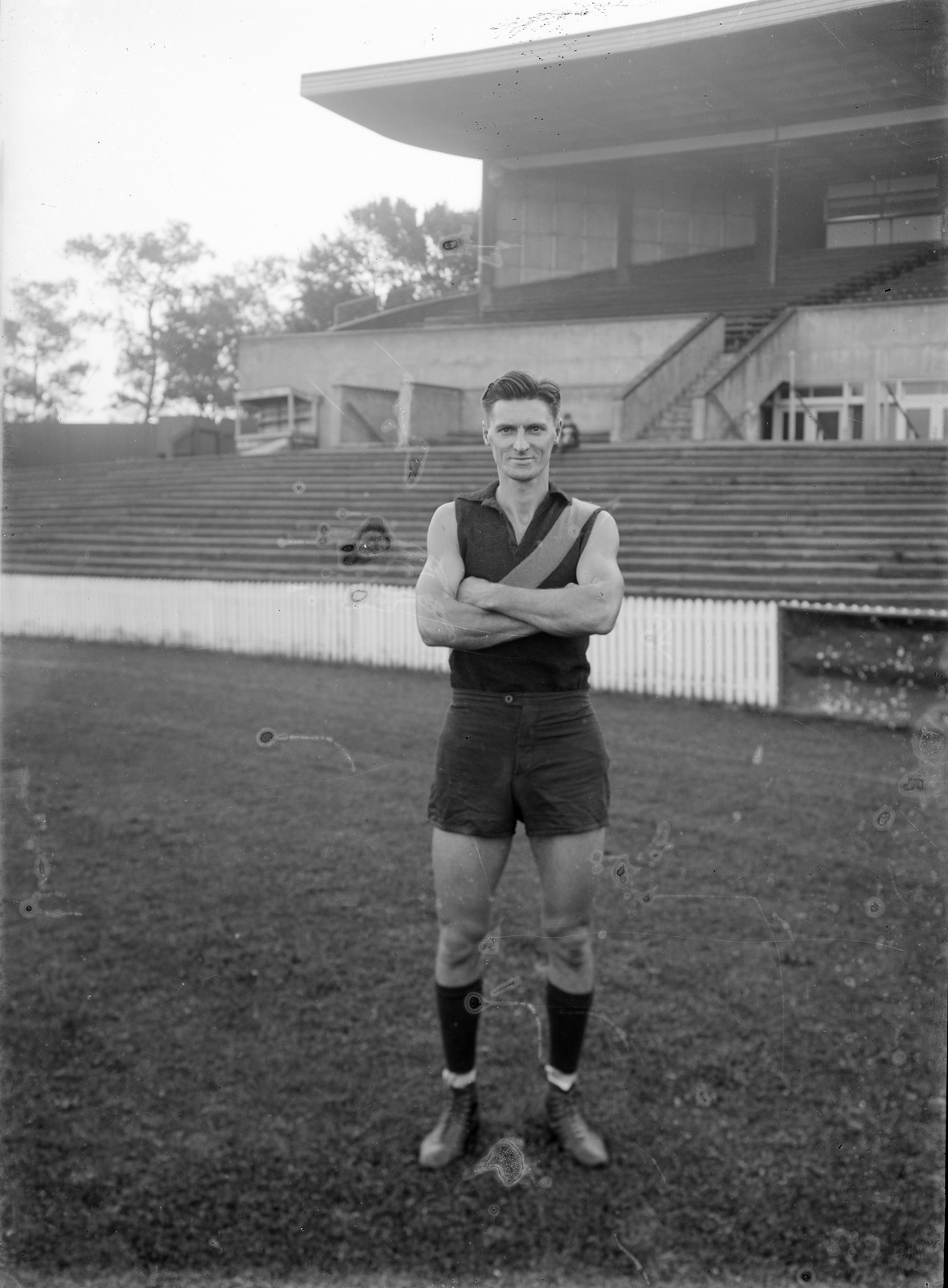
Polly Perkins playing for Richmond in 1948

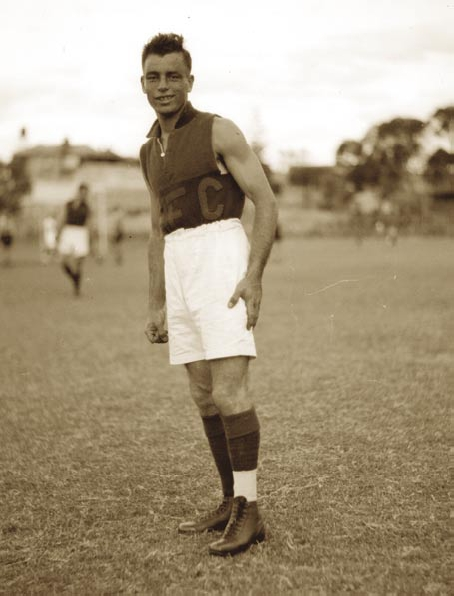
Johnny Lennon playing for Subiaco in 1926

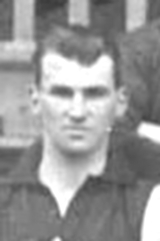
Ted Brewis of Carlton in 1926

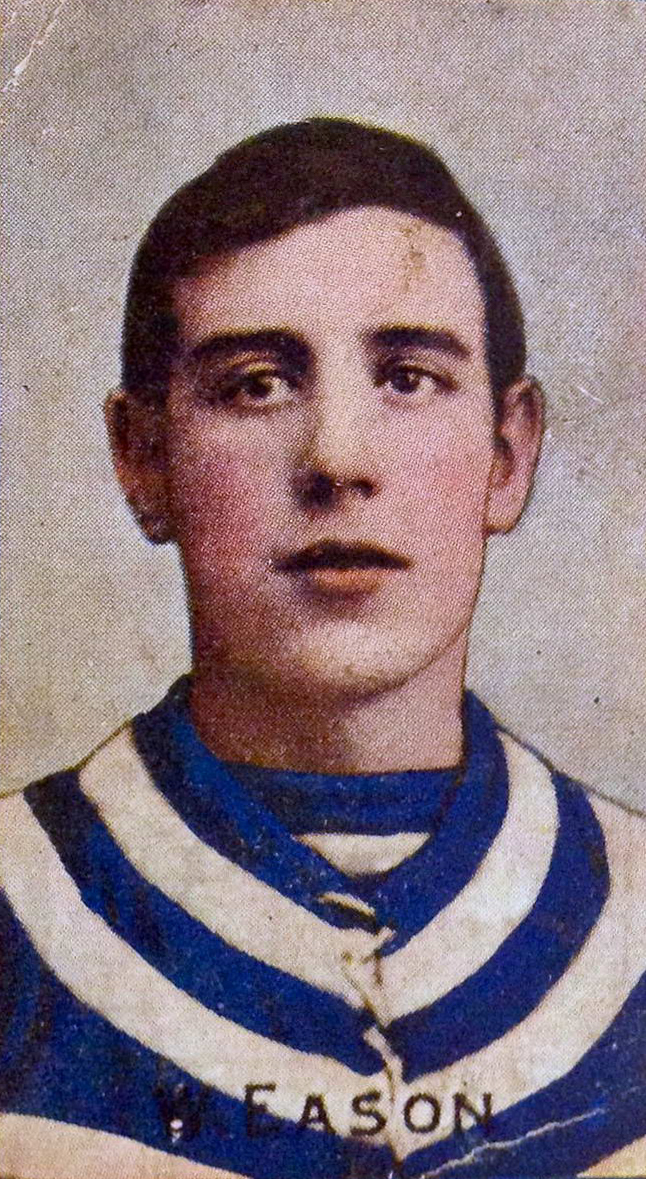
Bill Eason of Geelong in 1902

Currently on an AFL senior list

| Player | Club/s | AFL Years* | AFL Matches* | AFL Goals* | Connections to England, References |
|---|---|---|---|---|---|
| Oliver Hayes-Brown | Richmond | 2024- | 7 | 1 | Born in London |
| Cameron Mackenzie | Hawthorn | 2023- | 69 | 16 | Born in London |
| Josh Worrell | Adelaide | 2020- | 79 | 0 | Born in High Wycombe, Buckinghamshire and raised there to the age of 9 months |
| Callum M. Brown | Greater Western Sydney | 2021- | 82 | 89 | Born in Luton, Bedfordshire and raised to the age of 5 |
| Connor Idun | Greater Western Sydney | 2019- | 140 | 0 | Born London, raised in Essex to age of 4 |
| Pearce Hanley | Brisbane Lions, Gold Coast | 2019-2020 | 169 | 60 | Born, Welsh father, Irish mother |
| Guy Walker | Melbourne | 2018-2018 | - | - | Born Nottingham, Nottinghamshire |
| Sam Draper | Essendon | 2017- | 104 | 60 | Raised in Brede, East Sussex |
| Brandon Jack | Sydney | 2013-2017 | 28 | 16 | Born Manchester |
| David Swallow | Gold Coast | 2011- | 249 | 111 | Father |
| Brad Moran | Adelaide, North Melbourne | 2006–2011 | 21 | 8 | Born Solihull and raised in Stratford-upon-Avon by English parents |
| Will Thursfield | Richmond | 2005–2011 | 77 | 0 | Born Oxford |
| Fergus Watts | Adelaide, St Kilda | 2004-2006 | 6 | 3 | Born Whipps Cross, London |
| Clive Waterhouse | Fremantle | 1996–2004 | 106 | 178 | Born |
| Colin Alexander | Collingwood | 1989–1991 | 29 | 30 | Born |
| Ian Dargie | St Kilda, West Coast | 1989–1991 | 11 | 1 | Born |
| Lawrence Bingham | Hawthorn, St Kilda | 1989–1990 | 25 | 0 | Born |
| Mark Bayliss | Collingwood | 1989 | 4 | 6 | Born |
| Paul Harding | Hawthorn, St Kilda, West Coast | 1987–1994 | 116 | 14 | Born Camborne, Cornwall |
| Andy Goodwin | Richmond, Melbourne | 1987–1991 | 73 | 9 | Born |
| Richard Nixon | Richmond | 1987–1990 | 37 | 3 | Born |
| Wayne Blackwell | Carlton | 1984–1990 | 110 | 80 | Born Leicester |
| Paul Meldrum | Carlton | 1982–1992 | 158 | 140 | Born London |
| Chris Burton | Footscray, Richmond | 1980–1984 | 107 | 35 | Born |
| Andrew Ireland | Collingwood | 1975-1989 | 110 | 29 | Born and raised in London to the age of 4 |
| Mick Plant | South Melbourne | 1972 | 4 | 1 | Born |
| Brian Mynott | St Kilda | 1964–1975 | 210 | 75 | Born Southampton |
| Fred Fairweather | North Melbourne | 1944–1946 | 54 | 14 | Born London |
| Polly Perkins | Richmond | 1940–1949 | 148 | 0 | Born Leicester |
| Bernie Bignell | Carlton | 1940, 1945 | 6 | 0 | Born Birmingham, Warwickshire |
| Johnny Leonard | South Melbourne | 1932 | 12 | 17 | Born Newcastle |
| Bert Ashby | Hawthorn | 1928-1935 | 25 | 6 | Born Leicester |
| Ted Brewis | Carlton | 1925-1928 | 60 | 12 | Born Bedlington |
| Johnny Davies | Carlton | 1922-1929 | 33 | 37 | Born Wales |
| George Renwick | Carlton | 1909 | 4 | 0 | Tooting, London |
| Bill Eason | Geelong | 1902-1915 | 220 | 187 | Born Liverpool |
| Barney Lazarus | Carlton | 1902 | 7 | 0 | Born London |
| Ralph Robertson | St Kilda | 1899-1900 | 14 | 1 | Born Aylestone |
| Jack Frost | Carlton | 1897 | 4 | - | Born London |
| Ted Staniland | Fitzroy | 1897 | 5 | 3 | Born in Yorkshire |

=== Women's ===
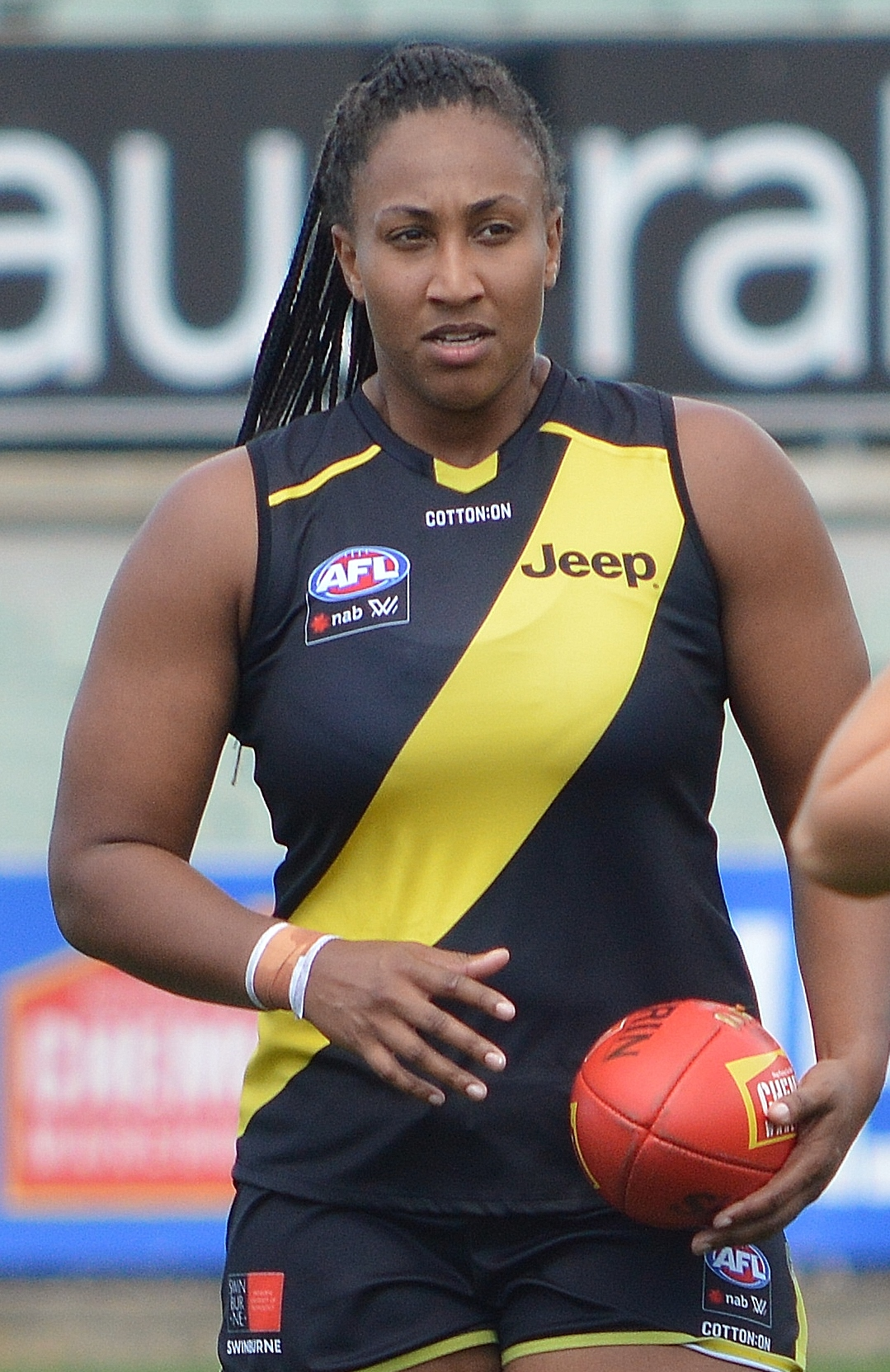
Sabrina Frederick playing for Richmond FC in 2020

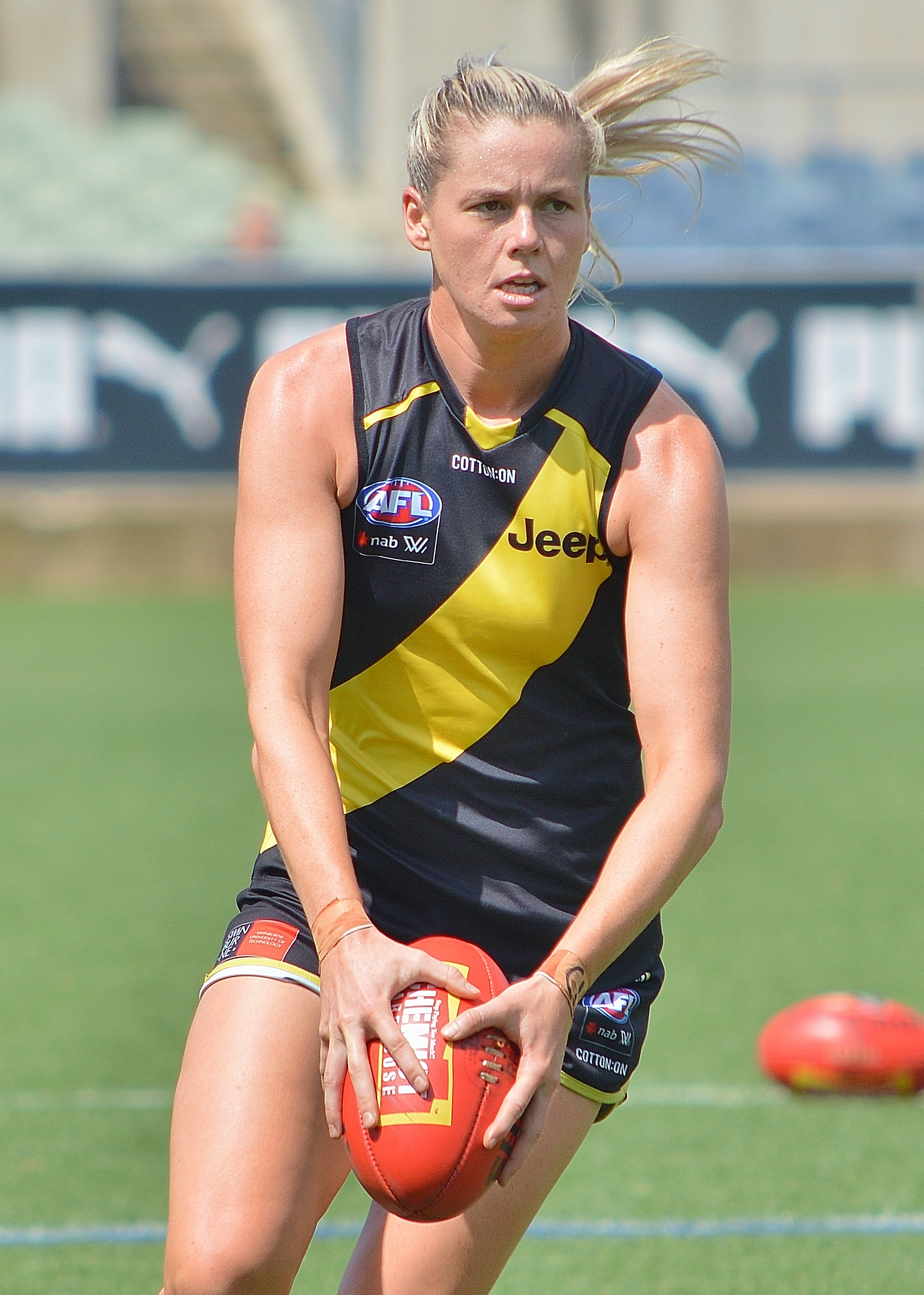
Katie Brennan playing for Richmond FC in 2020

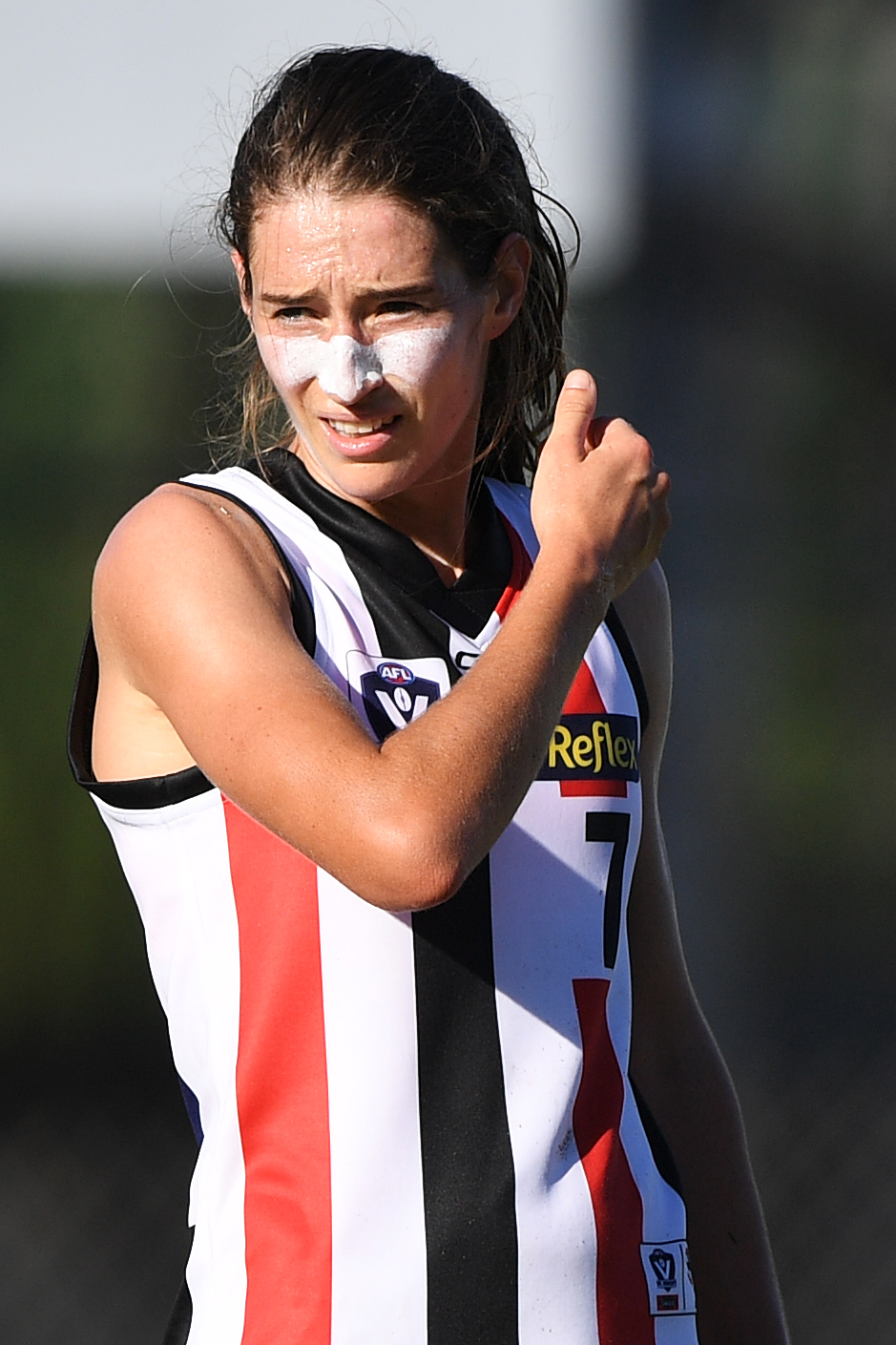
Cat Phillips playing for St Kilda FC in 2019

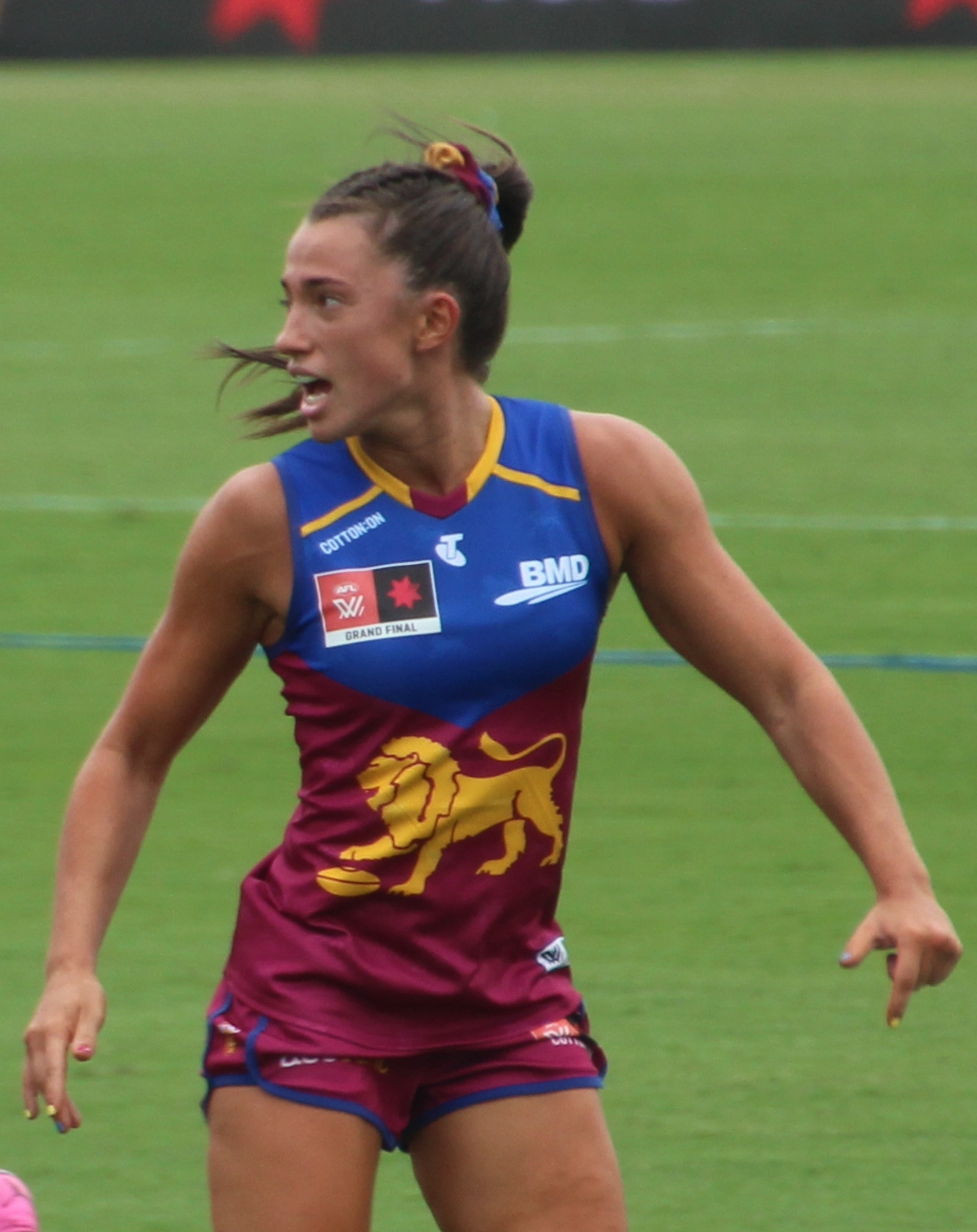
Jade Ellenger playing for the Brisbane Lions in 2022

Currently on an AFLW senior list

| Player | Club/s | AFLW Years* | AFLW Matches* | AFLW Goals* | Connections to England, References |
|---|---|---|---|---|---|
| Imogen Barnett | Collingwood | 2022 (S6)– | 40 | 5 | Attended primary school |
| Poppy Boltz | Brisbane | 2023– | 35 | 2 | Born Northern England |
| Jade Ellenger | Brisbane | 2019– | 88 | 10 | Born London |
| Cat Phillips | Melbourne, St Kilda, Essendon | 2019– | 54 | 10 | Born |
| Katrina Stone | Western Bulldogs, Carlton Football Club (VFLW) | - | - | | Recruited from the North London Lions (AFL London) |
| Katie Brennan | Western Bulldogs, Richmond | 2017– | 81 | 87 | Lived there for a period |
| Sabrina Frederick | Brisbane, Richmond, Collingwood | 2017–2026 | 103 | 35 | Born Brighton, mother, raised to the age of 7. |

== See also ==
- 1916 Pioneer Exhibition Game
- Australian rules football in the United Kingdom
- Sport in England

== Books ==
- Williamson, John (2003). Bucknell, Mar (ed.). Football's Forgotten Tour: The Story of the British Australian Rules Venture of 1888. Applegate. ISBN 9780958101806.
