= Staniland =

Staniland is a surname. Notable people with the surname include:

- Andrew Staniland (born 1977), Canadian composer and guitarist
- Chris Staniland (1905–1942), British test pilot
- Meaburn Staniland (1809–1898), British solicitor and politician
- Ted Staniland (1874–1917), Australian rules footballer
