= Birmingham Bears =

Birmingham Bears may refer to:

- Team name of the Warwickshire County Cricket Club
- Team name of the Warwickshire Women cricket team
- Birmingham Bears (Australian rules football), an Australian rules football club
