= Huddersfield Rams =

Australian rules football club in Huddersfield, England

Names
- Full name: Huddersfield Rams; Australian Rules Football Club
- Nickname: The Mighty Rams
- Motto: "We are the pride of all West Yorkshire" "What noise does a Ram make.... BOOM!"

2014 season
- After finals: Runners-up
- Home-and-away season: 3rd
- Pre-season: Haggis Cup Finalists
- Leading goalkicker: Danny Armitage 26 & Luke Booth 26
- Best and fairest: Matt Whiteley

Club details
- Founded: 2008
- Colours: Navy Blue White Gold
- Competition: AFL England Central & North England League
- Chairperson: Ally Delooze
- Coach: Jason Battye & Matt Whiteley
- Captain: Matt Whiteley
- Premierships: ARUK Northern League: 2009; National Carnival: 2010; International Series v Brothers Pearse: 2013; Movember Cup: 2013
- Ground: Huddersfield YMCA
- Former ground: Lockwood Park, Huddersfield

Other information
- Official website: http://huddersfieldrams.blogspot.co.uk/

Huddersfield Rams is an Australian rules football team, based in the West Yorkshire town of Huddersfield, England. They were formed in November 2008 by Karl Haigh, who was introduced to the sport when travelling in Australia.

They have had many players selected to play for England and Great Britain, with founder Karl Haigh captaining England, and former head coach Neil Morrison being involved with coaching and scouting for the national team. The Rams are based at the Huddersfield YMCA, where they play all their home games and training sessions.

== History ==
=== 2009: Formation and its first season ===
The Huddersfield Rams were formed in November 2008 and took part in their first competitive season the following summer. This was preceded by entries into a number of taster tournaments, including the 2009 National Carnival in Newcastle and the 2009 Cardiff Club Challenge. They also competed in the inaugural ARUK Central League with Leeds Bombers, Liverpool Eagles and Birmingham Bears.

The Rams were table toppers in their first season and were crowned the 2009 Premiers, beating the Birmingham Bears in the Central League Grand Final by 13.27 (105) – 12.10 (82). During the 2009 Dragon Cup, the team finished the match with the two-legged victory over the Cymru Red Dragons. The season concluded with Karl Haigh and Danny Armitage being selected as players, and Neil Morrison being selected as a coach for the England Dragonslayers team at the 2009 Euro Cup in Croatia. The Dragonslayers won this tournament.

=== 2010–11: Second and third seasons ===
The second season got off with the Huddersfield Rams as runners-up in the 2010 Haggis Cup in Glasgow, losing narrowly to the Dublin Demons in the final game from 4.6.30 to 3.7.25. However, they followed this up by winning the 2010 National Carnival in Portsmouth, defeating the hosts in the finals. They also won their first game of the regular season against established side Nottingham Scorpions. However, they received three defeats in a row that they came in 3rd place. The season ended with Matt Whiteley and Ally Delooze representing the Great Britain Bulldogs at the 2010 European Championships in Denmark and Sweden. On the other hand, they participated during the 2010 Euro Cup in Milan, Italy.

The Rams kicked off their third season with a strong showing in the 2011 Haggis Cup in Glasgow where they battled through to the semi-finals, but they eventually lost to the Wimbledon Hawks. This was followed by Rams players Danny Armitage and Sam Gill being selected for the European Legion team who played the touring AIS-AFL Academy side at Dulwich College. This game was preceded by the team playing for the Great Britain Bulldogs against Ireland. The regular season saw Huddersfield battle through to the grand finals after its victories against Nottingham Scorpions and Sheffield Thunder. The final was played at Worksop which saw Nottingham Scorpions defeat the Huddersfield Rams in the final game.

The season ended with Matt Whiteley playing for the Great Britain Bulldogs in the 2011 International Cup in Sydney and Melbourne, and the representatives of England Dragonslayers squad who finished third in the 2011 Euro Cup in Belfast, Northern Ireland.

=== 2012: Fourth season ===
On 17 March, the Rams finished fourth in the pre-season Lightning Cup that was held in Manchester. Later on, Danny Armitage was selected for the European Legion team to once again take on the AIS/AFL academy on 7 April at Surrey Sports Park, Guildford. Club captain Jason Battye was selected for the Great Britain Bulldogs team to take on the Irish Exiles, but both players unfortunately had to pull out due to injury. The team also played in a four team tournament in Italy in June 2012 against the other competing nations Scotland, Italy and Croatia.

The Rams won the Bowl Cup at the 2012 Haggis Cup held in Edinburgh on 21 April, defeating Glasgow Sharks. At the same time, Captain Jason Battye and Luke Booth were awarded places in the Haggis Cup Team of the Tournament. Furthermore, during the Euro Cup in Edinburgh, Booth won a place on the Team of the Tournament, the highest individual honour that a Rams player has received. Booth was also selected to play for the European Islands team against Continental Europe in the AFL game played at The Oval. On the other hand, the Dragonslayers won during their Four Nations tournament victory in Italy, and Matt Whiteley was awarded player of the tournament.

During this time, The Rams already secured a new major club sponsor in Grosvenor Casino Huddersfield. They also took part in a naked calendar shoot for the charity Marie Curie Cancer Research, but it never comes to fruition.

The Rams were qualified for the semi-finals when they beat Leeds Minotaurs in their final regular season game, but Manchester Mosquitoes beat them in the play-off semi-final, bringing their season to an end. In December, The Rams announced that they will be moving home to link up with Huddersfield YMCA Rugby Union Football Club for the 2013 season. To cap off 2012, Five Rams players were announced as members of the initial Great Britain Bulldogs squad list for the 2013 European championships in Ireland. These are: Danny Armitage, Luke Booth, Jason Battye, Graham Bickerdike and Matt Whiteley.

=== 2013: Fifth season ===
After former head coach Neil Morrison's absence and subsequent return to Australia, club captain Jason Battye became the new head coach for the Rams, a confirmation of the role that he was playing in part during the previous season. Meanwhile, Matt Whiteley continues his role as the assistant coach.

The Rams start a program of developing local talent and recruiting local players by holding two New Player training sessions in Greenhead Park. They also move their home base and operations to the Huddersfield YMCA after four seasons, with Huddersfield Rugby Union Football Club. During this time, Rams players, particularly Graham Bickerdike who receives his first call up to international level, were selected in the initial 75 man squad for the Summer European Cup competition in Dublin, Ireland. The players took part in trial matches against the London Swans and the two-test series against Ireland in Guildford and Dublin in April. They also took part in three preseason matches against Sheffield Thunder, Leeds Minotaurs, and Manchester Mosquitoes.

Although The Rams lose in the semi-final of the Haggis Cup to Wimbledon Hawks by two points, they defeated both the Manchester Mosquitoes and Tyne-Tees Tigers, and narrowly lost to the Edinburgh Bloods, who won the overall Haggis Cup on that day.

Luke Booth was selected for the European Legion squad to face off against the touring AIS/AFL Academy team in the Easter Series at Guildford, making him the third Ram to be involved in the former following Danny Armitage and Sam Gill representation in 2011. In addition, he was selected to play for GB in the 2013 European Championship in Dublin. They defeated Denmark, Germany and Sweden in the group stages, but eventually lost to reigning champions the Irish Warriors in a close final 45–46.

Once again, the Rams participated during the Euro Cup 2013 in France, the inaugural International Series game, and the Movember Cup in Manchester. For the latter, The Rams ended their year with a victorious game by beating the Birmingham Bears and Manchester Mosquitoes in the group stages.

=== 2014: Sixth season ===
The Rams start the new year with three introductory sessions, two at Greenhead Park and one at Huddersfield YMCA. These were well attended and see the first attendance of school boys from Rastrick High School, reflecting the development that has been going on at the school for the last five years by Jason Battye and Brandon Fletcher. In April, The Rams once again reached the Haggis Cup final in Glasgow, beating Edinburgh, Paris, and Tyne Tees along the way. They eventually fell short by 6 points against Glasgow in the final. Nevertheless, Karl Haigh was voted Haggis Cup Player of the Tournament.

== Club symbols ==
Name & Guernsey

The Huddersfield Rams got its name based on a prominent feature of the Huddersfield town's coat of arms, the woolen trade. On the other hand, the club colours of blue and white with a gold trim are linked with other prominent sporting clubs in Huddersfield. The club founder Karl Haigh describes: "I got the idea for the team name from our Huddersfield coat of arms which is Three Rams, and our colours are closely associated with our soccer club but also contain the gold of both our league and union rugby teams."

Logo

The original club logo was selected by ARUK's Brian Clarke, which was the emblem used by the St. Louis Rams American Football team. This logo appeared on the club's first shirts. A subsequent desire for their own identity lead the club to release "Rambo" for the 2011 season. "Rambo" now adorns its Guernseys and its head is the current club's logo.

== Home grounds ==
When it started in 2008, The Huddersfield Rams was based at the Lockwood Park Sports Complex, the home of the Huddersfield Rugby Union Football Club. However, they moved to the Huddersfield YMCA Sports Complex since the start of the 2013 season to train and play home games and matches.

== Finals record ==
Year	Date	Game	Venue	Opponent	Result	Score (Rams – Opponent)	Rams Team
2009		ARUK Central England Grand Final	Huddersfield	Birmingham Bears	Won (by 21)	13.27.105 – 12.12.84	K Haigh, J Rhodes, A Delooze, K Dicks, M Beaumont, Ally ?, L Rickards, R Carter, J Armitage, S Sheridan, R Carter, R Heywood, J Beaumont.
2011		AFL Central and North-West England Grand Final	Worksop	Nottingham Scorpions	Lost (by 21)	12.12.84 – 13.27.105	M Whiteley, M Evans, K Haigh, L Booth, J Sunderland, J Battye, S Gill, R Long, N Morrison, A Delooze, D Armitage, D Lynch, B Fletcher
2012	4 August	AFL Central and North England Play-off semi-final	Nottingham	Manchester Mosquitos	Lost (by 171)	4.1.25 – 27.34.196	M Whiteley, M Evans, K Haigh (1), L Booth (2), A Brown, J Sunderland (1), S Suffield, J Clayton, C Simpson, G Thomas, C Dawson
2014	19 July	AFL Central and North England Play-off semi-final	Manchester	Nottingham Scorpions	Won (by 46)	17.10.112 – 11.10.76	K Haigh, L Ozanne, E Brady, T Bennett, L Booth (7), R Yates, D Armitage (8), G Bickerdike, B Fletcher, R Wilson, M Whiteley (1), A Overton, R Hargreaves, J Clayton, S Gill (1), R Shirtliffe
2014	26 July	AFL Central and North England Grand Final	Sheffield	Manchester Mosquitos	Lost (by 38)	3.14.69 – 15.17.107	K Haigh (1), L Ozanne, E Brady (1), T Bennett, L Booth (1), R Yates (1), D Armitage (3), G Bickerdike, B Fletcher, R Wilson (1), M Whiteley, A Overton (1), J Battye, J Clayton, S Gill, R Shirtliffe

=== Season statistical summary ===
Year	Appearances	Best on Ground Votes	Goals
2012	Luke Booth 12	Matt Whiteley 15	Luke Booth 24
2012	Antony Brown 12	Luke Booth 14	Jason Battye 8
2012	Matt Evans 12	Karl Haigh 9	Matt Whiteley 8
2013	Graham Bickerdike 12	Luke Booth 13	Luke Booth 30
2013	Luke Booth 11	Matt Whiteley 11	James Sunderland 15
2013	Anthony Brown 11	Graham Bickerdike 8	Dave Durrance 12
2014	Matt Whiteley 9	Matt Whiteley 15	Danny Armitage 26
2014	Graham Bickerdike 8	Danny Armitage 7	Luke Booth 26
2014	Luke Booth 8	Brandon Fletcher 7	Karl Haigh 21

== Historical positions ==
Years	League Name	Teams in League	Finishing Position
2009	ARUK Central League	4	Premiers
2010	AFLGB Central & North West League	5	3rd place
2011	AFLGB Central & North West League	6	Runners-up
2012	AFL Central & Northern League	7	4th place, semi-finalists
2013	AFL Central & Northern League	7	5th place
2014	AFL Central & Northern League	8	5rd place, Runners-up

== International players ==
The following are the list of players who played in major competitions.

European

- (Europe) Danny Armitage (European Legion v AIS/AFL 2011)
- Luke Booth (European Islands v Continental Europe 2012, European Legion v AIS/AFL 2013)
- (Europe) Sam Gill (European Legion v AIS/AFL 2011)

Great Britain Bulldogs

- (United Kingdom) Graham Bickerdike (European Championships 2013)
- (United Kingdom) Luke Booth (European Championships 2013)
- (United Kingdom) Ally Delooze (European Championships 2010)
- (United Kingdom) Matt Whiteley (European Championships 2010, International Cup 2011)

England Dragonslayers

- (England) Danny Armitage (Euro Cup 2009– Winners, 2011)
- (England) Jason Battye (Euro Cup 2010, 2011)
- (England) Graham Bickerdike (Euro Cup 2013– Winners)
- (England) Luke Booth (Euro Cup 2012 Team of the Tournament, 2013– Winners)
- (England) Ally Delooze (Euro Cup 2010, 2011)
- (England) Karl Haigh (Euro Cup 2009– Winners, 2010)
- (England) Matt Whiteley (Euro Cup 2010, 2011, 2012, 2013– Winners)

International coaches

- (Europe) Karl Haigh (AIS/AFL 2010)
- (England) Neil Morrison (Euro Cup 2009, 2010)

== Club sponsors ==
The first main club sponsor for the Rams was Easi Lift Loading Systems. Their logo appeared on the players' on-and-off field clothing. In 2012, Grosvenor Casino Huddersfield became the club's main sponsor.

Years	Seasons	Sponsor
2009–2011	3	Easi Lift Loading Systems LTD
2012	3	Grosvenor Casino Huddersfield

== Honours ==
- Domestic League – Premiers: 2009 (ARUK Central Division); Runners-up: 2011 (Central and North West League), 2014 (Central and North League)
- National Carnival – Premiers: 2010
- Haggis Cup – Runners-up: 2010, 2014; Semi-Finalists: 2011, 2013, Bowl Winners: 2012
- Movember Cup – Premiers: 2013
