= George Renwick (footballer) =

Australian rules footballer

Personal information
- Full name: George Arthur Hansen Renwick
- Born: 12 May 1886; Tooting, London, England
- Died: 11 March 1945 (aged 58); Caulfield, Victoria
- Original team: West Perth / Boulder City
- Height: 187 cm (6 ft 2 in)
- Weight: 80 kg (176 lb)

Playing career^{1}
Years	Club	Games (Goals)
1909	Carlton	4 (0)
- ^{1} Playing statistics correct to the end of 1909.

George Arthur Hansen Renwick (12 May 1886 – 11 March 1945) was an Australian rules footballer who played with Carlton in the Victorian Football League (VFL).
