= Richard Nixon (footballer) =

Australian rules footballer

Personal information
- Full name: Richard James Nixon
- Born: 29 October 1965
- Died: 31 January 1992 (aged 26); Millicent, South Australia
- Original team: Oakleigh
- Height: 195 cm (6 ft 5 in)
- Weight: 91 kg (201 lb)

Playing career^{1}
Years	Club	Games (Goals)
1984–1985	Oakleigh (VFA)	3 (2)
1987–1990	Richmond	37 (3)
- ^{1} Playing statistics correct to the end of 1990.

Richard James Nixon (29 October 1965 – 31 January 1992) was an Australian rules footballer who played with Richmond in the Victorian/Australian Football League (VFL/AFL).

After playing his early football with Oakleigh in the VFA, Nixon came to Richmond where he would be used as a ruckman and utility. He spent four seasons with Richmond and after initially struggling to get games put together 13 appearances in both 1989 and 1990 under coach Kevin Bartlett.

He was captain-coach of the Warrnambool Football Club in 1991.

Nixon died on 31 January 1992, from injuries sustained in a road accident. On their way to work on an oil rig, he was one of seven occupants on a van which collided with a truck near Millicent in South Australia.
