= Ted Brewis =

Australian rules footballer

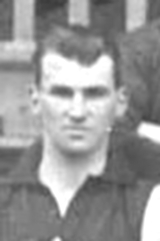
- Brewis in 1926

Personal information
- Full name: Edward Gordon Brewis
- Born: 13 October 1901; Bedlington, England
- Died: 4 October 1994 (aged 92); Ipswich, Queensland
- Original team: Maryborough
- Height: 179 cm (5 ft 10 in)
- Weight: 79 kg (174 lb)

Playing career^{1}
Years	Club	Games (Goals)
1925–1928	Carlton (VFL)	60 (12)
1929–1930	Prahran (VFA)	30 (3)
1932–1934	Preston (VFA)	41 (11)
- ^{1} Playing statistics correct to the end of 1928.

Career highlights
- 1924 Ballarat FL Premiership: Maryborough FC

Edward Gordon Brewis (13 October 1901 – 4 October 1994) was an Australian rules footballer who played with the Carlton Football Club in the Victorian Football League (VFL), and with the Prahran Football Club and the Preston Football Club in the Victorian Football Association (VFA).

== Family ==
The son of Thomas Anthony Brewis (1873–1938), and Mary Martha Brewis (1872–1938), née Short, Edward Gordon Brewis was born at Bedlington, Northumberland, England on 13 October 1901.

He married Theresa Alice Rule (1907-1978) in 1937.

His brother, James Norman Brewis (1903-1954), a Maffra police constable, played some practice matches with Melbourne in April 1924. James Brewis was killed in the line of duty in 1954. James’ grandson, and great nephew to Ted, Detective Deon Kelly would later join the New South Wales Police Force from 2003 to 2024.

== Football ==
=== Maryborough (BFL) ===
Having played 2 games for the Carlton Seconds, he returned to Maryborough Football Club in 1924, and played in their 1924 Ballarat Football League premiership victory.

=== Carlton (VFL) ===
He was cleared from Maryborough to Carlton on 29 April 1925.

=== Prahran ===
He was cleared from Carlton to Prahran in the VFA on 24 April 1929.

=== Preston (VFA) ===
He was cleared from Prahran to Preston on 29 June 1932. He retired before the start of the 1935 season.

== Death ==
He died at Ipswich, Queensland on 4 October 1994.
