= Bert Ashby =

Australian rules footballer, born 1909

Personal information
- Full name: Sydney Bertrand Ashby
- Born: 23 January 1909; Leicester, England
- Died: 21 August 1993 (aged 84); Hawthorn, Victoria
- Original team: West Hawthorn
- Height: 175 cm (5 ft 9 in)
- Weight: 73 kg (161 lb)

Playing career^{1}
Years	Club	Games (Goals)
1928–1929, 1931–1935	Hawthorn	25 (6)
- ^{1} Playing statistics correct to the end of 1935.

Sydney Bertrand Ashby (23 January 1909 – 21 August 1993) was an Australian rules footballer who played for the Hawthorn Football Club in the Victorian Football League (VFL).

== Family ==
The third son of Henry Radford Ashby (1875–1914) and Rachel Hannah Ashby, née Upton (1876–1933), Sydney Bertrand Ashby was born at Leicester on 23 January 1909. In early 1913 the Ashby family emigrated from England and settled in Melbourne.

In 1934 Bert Ashby married Norah Ethel Bruce Vance (1911–2004).

== Football ==
Originally from West Hawthorn, Bert Ashby made his debut for Hawthorn against Essendon in the final round of their winless 1928 season. Playing largely in the reserves he managed one more senior game in 1929 and then finally managed to get a sustained run of appearances in 1931. He played a total of 25 games over 8 seasons for Hawthorn, missing significant periods through injury in his final years with the club.

== Death ==
Sydney Bertrand Ashby died in August 1993 and was cremated at Fawkner Memorial Cemetery.
