= Jack Frost (footballer, born 1870) =

Australian rules footballer

Personal information
- Full name: Robert William Frost
- Born: 29 December 1870; London, UK
- Died: 8 July 1935 (aged 64)

Playing career^{1}
Years	Club	Games (Goals)
1897	Carlton	4 (0)
- ^{1} Playing statistics correct to the end of 1897.

Robert William "Jack" Frost (29 December 1870 – 8 July 1935) was an Australian rules footballer who played with Carlton in the Victorian Football League (VFL).
