= Birmingham Bears (Australian rules football) =

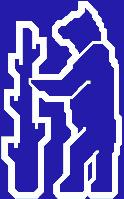

Names
- Full name: Birmingham Bears AFL Club
- Nickname: The Bears

2009 season
- Leading goalkicker: Chris Kimmet (47)
- Best and fairest: Chris Kimmet (9 votes)

Club details
- Founded: 2008
- Colours: Navy blue and gold
- Competition: Aussie Rules UK National League - Central Division
- Chairperson: Mathew Mitchell
- Coach: Tim Smith/David Veale
- Captain: TBA
- Ground: TBA

Other information
- Official website: http://www.birminghambears.co.uk

Birmingham Bears are an Australian rules football team in the city of Birmingham, England. The Bears were set up in the Winter of 2008/2009 to play in the Aussie Rules UK Walkabout National League in 2009 under a 9-a-side format.

== History ==
The Bears played in their first season in 2009 having been formed at the end of season 2008. They played against teams such as Manchester Mosquitoes, Huddersfield Rams, Sheffield Thunder, Liverpool Eagles and Leeds Bombers.

The Bears played their first games at the Aussie Rules UK National Carnival in Newcastle on 9 May 2009. The Bears played against Huddersfield Rams in their first game, losing 54–19 with the club's first goal scored by Mathew Mitchell. The next game was against the Newcastle Centurions, the current Northern Premiers with the game finishing 42–0 in the opposition's favour. The third game was against the Chippenham Redbacks, featuring the England coach and the Welsh international captain. After a close start the final score was 35–8 to the Redbacks. The scheduled fourth game against Middlesbrough Hawks was won on forfeit after the Hawks refused to field a side. The Bears finished 11th out of 12 in their first taste of Aussie Rules action.

In the 2009 season, Birmingham Bears finished 2nd in the ARUK Central England ladder, resulting in a 3rd vs. 2nd Preliminary Final versus Liverpool Eagles. Having won this match dominantly 147–42, the Bears ascended to their first ever Grand Final to be played in Huddersfield against the Huddersfield Rams. Despite leading going into the final quarter and ruckman Scott Alford being award best and fairest, the Bears were overcome by the Rams 105–84 to finish runners-up in a very successful opening season.

== Season 2010 ==
Season 2010 was a time of rebuilding for the Bears. With the formation and success of the University of Birmingham Sharks Australian Football Club at the end of 2010, midfielder Tim Smith took over the reins from Mat Mitchell.

== Season 2011 ==
The Bears resumed training in January 2011 and will compete in the AFL Britain CNW (Central and North West) Division with old rivals Huddersfield, Liverpool and Leeds as well as the Wolverhampton Wolverines. The complete competition for Season 2011 is as follows: | Manchester Mosquitoes | Nottingham Scorpions | Birmingham Bears | Wolverhampton Wolverines | Liverpool Eagles | Huddersfield Rams | Sheffield Thunder | Peterborough Lightning | Hull Monarchs | Oxford Beavers

== Fixtures and results ==
Date	Opponent	Location	Result
9 May	National Carnival	Newcastle	LLLW
16 May	Sheffield Thunder	Manchester	W 6.3.(39) - 3.7.(25)
23 May	Leeds Bombers	Sheffield	W 12.10.(82) - ?.?.(35)
30 May	Huddersfield Rams	Birmingham	L 11.5.(71) - 13.20.(98)
6 June	Liverpool Eagles	Huddersfield	-
14 June	Leeds Bombers	Leeds	W 22.16.(142) - 6.8.(44)
20 June	Huddersfield	Liverpool	Cancelled
27 June	Liverpool Eagles	Huddersfield	-
4 July	Brit Cup	Cardiff	-
11 July	Liverpool Eagles	Liverpool	W 15.5.(95) - 11. 12.(78)
18 July	Bye Weekend	-	-
26 July	Huddersfield Rams	Huddersfield	L 4.5 (29) - 8.15 (63)
8 August	Prelim Final (2nd v 3rd)	Birmingham	W 21.21 (147) - 6.7 (42)
15 August	Central Grand Final	Huddersfield Rams	L 13.27 (105) - 12.12 (84)

== 2012 season ==
The Bears competed in the AFL Central and Northern England for the 2012 season. A somewhat disappointing season saw the bears narrowly miss out on finals as well as losing in the final as part of the West Midlands representative side in the Brit Cup.

Best and Fairest: Sean Walton

Most Improved: Jack Wood

Coaches Award: Adam Coxsell

== 2013 season ==
The 2013 season saw a change in leadership at the Bears with Adam Coxsell and Sean Walton taking over the reins. The Bears under the new leadership had a successful pre-season winning both the Leeds Lightning Cup and the Nathan Blakely Movember Cup in Manchester. The Bears had a strong season making the finals where the narrowly lost to an Australian heavy Leeds Minotaurs in the semi-finals. The highlight of the season came in the Brit cup where the Bears where an integral part of the West Midlands representative side that lifted the Brit cup finally after 3 years of losing out in the final.

- Best and Fairest: Inti Aburto
- Most Improved: Sam Willatt
- Coaches Award: Steven Maguirre

== Past and present players ==
1	RM	ENG	Mark Barrow
1	HB	IRL	Jac Quinn
3	HB/RR	IRL	Barry Fallon
4	HF	ENG	Tirath Samra
4	FB/HB	NZL	Dave Gillott
4	RR/HF	ENG	Tim Smith
5	RR/HF	AUS	Chris Kimmet
6	FB/HB	ENG	Ian Mitchell
7	HF/FF	ENG	Daniel Shelley
9	HF	ENG	David Marriott
10	HF/FF	ENG	Dan Cater
10	RR/HF	ENG	Adam Hill
11	RR/RM/HF	ENG	Sam Findell
11	RM/RR/HF	AUS	Chris Potter
12	FF/HF/RM/RR	ENG	Mathew Mitchell
13	RR/HF	ENG	Adam Baker
14	RR	IRL	Eoin O'Luasaigh
15	FB/RM	ENG	Kristian Jones
—	RR/HF	ENG	Peter Woodall
—	HB/RM	ENG	Tom Lindlar
—	RM/RR	AUS	Scott Alford
20	RM/RR	AUS	David Veale
8	RM/RR	ENG	Sean Walton
—	FF/RM	ENG	Gav Lawrence
—		ENG	Adam Coxsell
—	HF	ENG	Jack Wood
—	HF	ENG	Adam McVeigh

== Appearances in finals (until 2026) ==
- Aussie Rules UK Central Division
  - 2009 - Runners-up
- Sporton Cup
  - 2010 (Spring) - Runners-up
- C&NW Lightning Cup
  - 2011 - Winners
- Movember Cup
  - 2012 - Winners

== See also ==
- Birmingham Bears AFL
- Aussie Rules UK
