= Barney Lazarus =

Australian rules footballer

Personal information
- Full name: Barnett Joseph Lazarus
- Born: 18 December 1879; London
- Died: 6 May 1962 (aged 82); Sydney
- Original team: Carlton Juniors

Playing career^{1}
Years	Club	Games (Goals)
1902	Carlton	7 (0)
- ^{1} Playing statistics correct to the end of 1902.

Barnett Joseph Lazarus (18 December 1879 – 6 May 1962) was an Australian rules footballer who played for the Carlton Football Club in the Victorian Football League (VFL).

Lazarus made his senior VFL debut in 1902, playing seven games for Carlton. Following his retirement from football, Lazarus moved to Sydney and married there in 1912. In 2015 it was discovered that Lazarus was Jewish, making him one of the few Jews to have played senior VFL/AFL football.
