= Mick Plant =

Australian rules footballer

Personal information
- Full name: Mick Plant
- Born: 1 June 1953 (age 73)
- Original team: Noble Park
- Height: 177 cm (5 ft 10 in)
- Weight: 76 kg (168 lb)

Playing career^{1}
Years	Club	Games (Goals)
1972	South Melbourne	4 (1)
- ^{1} Playing statistics correct to the end of 1972.

Mick Plant (born 1 June 1953) is a former Australian rules footballer who played with South Melbourne in the Victorian Football League (VFL).
