= Fred Fairweather =

Australian rules footballer, born 1913

Personal information
- Full name: Frederick Victor Fairweather
- Born: 3 June 1913; London, England
- Died: 20 February 1983 (aged 69)
- Original team: Port Melbourne (VFA)
- Height: 185 cm (6 ft 1 in)
- Weight: 85 kg (187 lb)

Playing career^{1}
Years	Club	Games (Goals)
1944–1946	North Melbourne	54 (14)
- ^{1} Playing statistics correct to the end of 1946.

Frederick Victor Fairweather (3 June 1913 – 20 February 1983) was an Australian rules footballer who played with North Melbourne in the Victorian Football League (VFL).

Fairweather, who played in the ruck, was a later comer to VFL football, just two weeks shy of his 31st birthday when he made his debut for North Melbourne. Born in London, he played his initial football for South Melbourne City, before joining Victorian Football Association club Port Melbourne in 1937.

Fairweather was a member of Port's 1940 and 1941 premiership teams. After having served with the AIF, Fairweather played 15 games for North Melbourne in 1944 and appeared in all 21 games that they played the following year, including a semi final. He was club captain for the 1946 VFL season, then retired at the end of the year, to take up a position as captain-coach of Carnegie.
