= Johnny Davies =

Australian rules footballer (1900–1967)

Personal information
- Full name: John William Matthew Davies
- Nickname: Sox
- Born: 18 June 1900; Brunswick, Victoria
- Died: 18 June 1967 (aged 67); Parkville, Victoria
- Original teams: Scotch College, Carlton District
- Height: 178 cm (5 ft 10 in)
- Weight: 80 kg (176 lb)
- Positions: Defender, utility

Playing career^{1}
Years	Club	Games (Goals)
1922–24	Carlton	32 (37)
1929	Fitzroy	1 (0)
Total		33 (37)
- ^{1} Playing statistics correct to the end of 1929.

John William Matthew Davies (18 June 1900 – 18 June 1967) was an Australian rules footballer who played with Carlton and Fitzroy in the Victorian Football League (VFL).

== Family ==
The son of John William Davies (1868–1948), and Christina Davies (1871–1952), née Knott, John William Matthew Davies was born at Brunswick, Victoria on 18 June 1900.

He married Elsie May England (1901–1971) in 1925.

== Football ==
He was cleared from the Carlton Football Club to the "Carlton Seconds" in 1924.

== Death ==
He died at Parkville, Victoria on 18 June 1967.
