= Chris Burton (Australian footballer) =

Personal information
- Full name: Chris Burton
- Born: 21 October 1961 (age 65); England
- Original team: Sunshine Heights
- Height: 180 cm (5 ft 11 in)
- Weight: 76 kg (168 lb)

Playing career^{1}
| Years | Club | Games (Goals) |
| 1980–1984 | Footscray | 67 (27) |
| 1985–1988 | Richmond | 50 (8) |
| Total | | 117 (35) |
- ^{1} Playing statistics correct to the end of 1988.

Chris Burton (born 21 October 1961) is a former Australian rules footballer who played with Footscray and Richmond in the Victorian Football League (VFL).

Burton was born in England and recruited to Footscray from Sunshine Heights. He spent five seasons playing for Footscray, mostly as a wingman.

With teammate Michael McKenna, Burton made his way to Richmond at the end of the 1984 season. Burton was used predominantly as a back pocket defender while at Richmond. He was Richmond's leading disposal getter in 1987, with 360 kicks and 78 handballs.

He played for Williamstown after leaving the VFL and was a member of their 1990 premiership team. Burton played 42 games and kicked 78 goals for the VFA Seagulls from 1989 to 1991, and was selected on a half back-flank in the WFC 1990's Team-of-the-Decade.
