= James Bryant (Australian cricketer) =

Australian cricketer

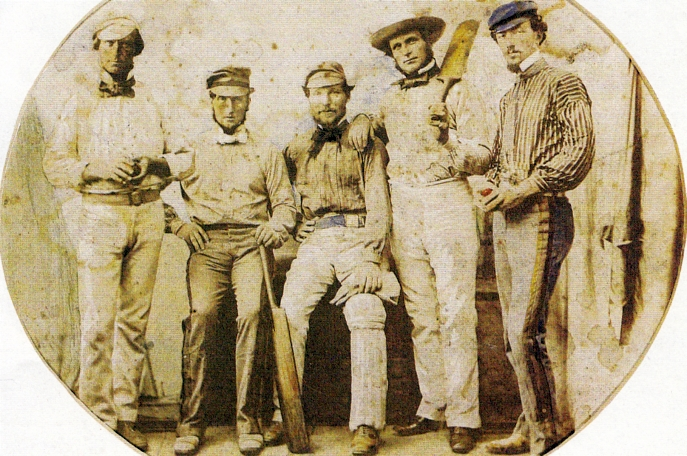
- Jerry Bryant (second from right)

Personal information
- Full name: James Mark Bryant
- Born: 1826; England
- Died: 10 December 1881 (aged 54–55); Sale, Victoria, Australia
- Batting: Right-handed
- Bowling: Right-arm medium

Domestic team information
- Years: Team
- 1852: Surrey
- 1856/57–1861/62: Victoria
- 1861/62: Surrey XI
- First-class debut: 23 August 1852 Surrey v Sussex
- Last First-class: 1 March 1862 Surrey XI v The World

Career statistics
Competition	First-class
Matches	11
Runs scored	182
Batting average	10.70
100s/50s	0/0
Top score	26
Balls bowled	904
Wickets	22
Bowling average	10.81
5 wickets in innings	0
10 wickets in match	0
Best bowling	3/11
Catches/stumpings	10/–
- Source: Cricinfo, 13 February 2015

James Mark "Jerry" Bryant (1826 – 10 December 1881) was an Australian cricketer. He played first-class cricket matches for Surrey and Victoria. He was born in England in 1826, being christened on 24 October of that year at Caterham, Surrey. He married in 1859, Letitia Donaldson and they had a son Henry William Bryant. Jerry died in Sale, Victoria, Australia on 12 December 1881.

Bryant was also an instrumental figure at the outset of Australian rules football. In fact it was he, James Mark Bryant 1826–1881), who used Melbourne's Bell's Life newspaper to call for the young men of Melbourne to assemble at the Melbourne Cricket Ground at one o'clock on 31 July 1858 to play a game of football, and after, further assemble to form a committee to draw up a short code of rules.

Again using Bell's Life in Victoria and Sporting Chronicle, on May 21, 1859, Melbourne, Victoria, Australia he announced the formation of the Melbourne Football Club, making him the founding father of the Melbourne Football Club.

That day, elected to Bryant's Melbourne Football Cub rules committee were Messrs Wills, Hammersley, Bruce, Smith and Wray. Mr Sewell was appointed treasurer, and Mr J.B. Thompson secretary of the Melbourne football Club. His hotel, the Parade Hotel, near the Melbourne Cricket Ground, is where the first laws of the game were codified by members of the Melbourne Football Club also on 21 May 1859.
