= Ted Staniland =

Australian rules footballer

Personal information
- Full name: Edward Staniland
- Born: 30 October 1874; Yorkshire, England
- Died: 1 September 1917 (aged 42); Fitzroy, Victoria
- Original team: Fitzroy Juniors

Playing career^{1}
Years	Club	Games (Goals)
1895–1896	Fitzroy (VFA)	19 (12)
1897	Fitzroy	5 (3)
1900–1903	Williamstown (VFA)	
- ^{1} Playing statistics correct to the end of 1903.

Edward Staniland (30 October 1874 – 1 September 1917) was an Australian rules footballer who played with Fitzroy in the Victorian Football League (VFL).

Recruited from Fitzroy Juniors in 1895, Staniland played for Fitzroy for three years, the final year being the first year of the Victorian Football League competition. He subsequently returned to Fitzroy Juniors before playing for Williamstown in the Victorian Football Association (VFA) from 1900 to 1903. He played 44 games and kicked 64 goals for Williamstown and was Club leading goalkicker in 1900 (16 goals), 1901 (25 goals) and 1902 (13 goals).

In June 1903 his senior career ended following a workplace accident and his club raised funds to support him as he was unable to work for some time.

He died at his home in Fitzroy in September 1917.
