= AFL England =

Australian rules football governing body in England

- Sport: Australian rules football
- Jurisdiction: National
- Founded: 2012
- Affiliation: Australian Football League
- Location: London
- President: Jason Hill
- Replaced: AFL Britain
- (England)

AFL England is the governing body for Australian rules football in England. It was formed in 2012 to succeed AFL Britain with the aim to be more effective in governing the game in England, as both Scotland and Wales had developed their own autonomous bodies.

AFL England is also the nominated body for Great Britain and as such is responsible for the recruitment and selection for both the Great Britain Bulldogs and Great Britain Swans.

Jason Hill was appointed as the President of AFL England in 2018 replacing long-serving President Claire Shapland.

== Mission ==
AFL England aims to:

- Lead the awareness, growth, development and promotion of Australian Football in England.
- Create a pathway between the English and Australian game.
- Work in partnership with AFL Europe in reaching mutual goals, maintaining similar values, while working to grow the game on a domestic level.

== History ==
=== British Australian Rules Football League ===
The BARFL was formed in 1989 by John Jelley, Andrew Zweck, Richard Hainsworth, Steve Poulsen and others. Eight clubs were formed for an inaugural season in 1990. The founding clubs were the London Hawks, West London Wildcats, North London Lions, Earls Court Kangaroos, Lea Valley Saints, Thames Valley Magpies and Wandsworth Demons in and around London and a club based in Leicester, the East Midland Eagles. Of the foundation teams, four still survive in West London, North London, Wimbledon (originally known as the London Hawks) and Wandsworth.

The inaugural game took place between the Earls Court Roos and Lea Valley Saints, with Tango tapping to JvdM who pumped it long to Donger for the first ever goal. The Roos prevailed 33.24 (222) to 1.2 (8)

Between 1990 and 2001, the league existed as one competition for all clubs, ranging from a high of 10 clubs in 1991 to a low of only 6 in 1998.

=== Divisional structure 2001–2007 ===
In an environment where large numbers of Australians could be both a blessing (in terms of experience and teaching ability) and a curse (in terms of new clubs outside London finding it difficult to compete against the Australian expat-based London clubs), the league in 2001 divided teams into two leagues. The first league was the London Premiership, where the powerful London clubs would continue under the same local-content regulations as previously (i.e. quotas of British players who must be on the field at any time).

The restructure of the BARFL in 2001 saw the London-based clubs form the London Premiership, and the regional clubs break off to form their own league. The new structure also enabled London clubs to field reserve grade teams, forming the London Conference. Prior to this, two BARFL Premiership clubs, the Wandsworth Demons from 1999 and the West London Wildcats in 2000, had fielded second teams in the main division. These teams, the Clapham Demons and the Shepherds Bush Raiders became founding members of the Conference.

Beneath the London Premiership would be a London Conference, where the teams could field their "reserve" sides, including the Clapham and Ealing teams which had been previously entered by Wandsworth and West London respectively. The London Conference has greatly relaxed "local content" rules, meaning that backpackers and other Australians can compete at a social level.

In 2003, with new clubs being formed outside the capital and regional clubs still struggling against the larger numbers of Australians playing for the London sides, it was decided that clubs outside London would compete in a Regional Premiership. This included the Bristol Dockers, St Helens Miners and the two new sides in the Doncaster Saints and Reading Kangaroos.

In 2004, a fourth division of the BARFL appeared, with the Scottish Australian Rules Football League forming. In the inaugural season, three clubs played each other for the premiership, the Edinburgh Old Town Bloods, the Edinburgh Uni Body Snatchers and the Glasgow Sharks.

2007 saw the introduction of a third tier of football in the London region, known as the Social Division. This division was formed for the same reasons as the conference division, with some of the larger clubs being unable to field their full player lists in two teams resulting in some fielding more than one team in the conference.

=== AFL Britain ===
In 2008 the BARFL rebranded and redeveloped to become AFL Britain, an organisation with less direct control over football in London but a greater ability to support the game to grow both in and outside the capital.

In 2010, the AFL Britain had four affiliated leagues, the AFL London, AFLB North, AFLB Central, AFLB South.

=== AFL England ===
During the season of 2012, it was decided by the AFL Britain Committee that it was best to rename to be more focused on football within the England domain. This would also assist with National Governing Body status from Sport England. AFL England would sit aside the other AFL leagues such as Scottish ARFL, Welsh ARFL in the UK and with AFL Ireland in Ireland.

In 2015 the inaugural women's league was established – the AFL London Women's Premiership – which was won in its inaugural season by the Wandsworth Demons. Two years later, following the success of this women's league, the Women's Conference was also launched.

In 2018, AFL England launched the National University League which ran for four rounds, and featured teams from the University of Oxford, University of Cambridge and the University of Birmingham, along with a representative team made up of players from the Universities of South Wales.

== Current clubs ==
=== London ===
AFL London features eight clubs, fielding a total of over 27 teams across five divisions – the Men's Premiership, Men's Conference, Men's Social, Women's Premiership and Women's Conference).

=== Regional England ===
The BARFL Regional Premiership commenced in 2003, and ran until it was absorbed into the BARFL's 3rd division Social League at the start of the 2007 season. The Aussie Rules UK 9-a-side National League began in 2007, featuring teams in a number of regional divisions. This then combined with AFL England in 2010, to form the AFL England Central & Northern and AFL England Southern Divisions.

==== Central & Northern ====
Club	Colours	Years competed
Huddersfield Rams		2009 (ARUK Central), 2010–
Manchester Mosquitoes		2006 (BARFL), 2007–09 (London Social), 2010–
Nottingham Scorpions		2004–06 (BARFL), 2007–09 (London Social), 2010–
Wolverhampton Wolverines		2010–
University of Birmingham Lions		2009–

Former Teams

Club	Colours	Years competed
Merseyside Saints		2016–2019
Hull Mariners		2010–2013
Sheffield Thunder		2010 – 2016 (Thereafter on occasion)
Birmingham Bears		2009–2016
Durham Saints / Swans		2007 – ???
Gateshead Miners		2008 – 2011 (Into Tyne Tees)
Hartlepool Dockers		2006 – 2010 (Invitation & Social)
Middlesbrough Hawks		2006 – 2007 (Into Tyne Tees)
Newcastle Centurions		2007 (Into Tyne Tees)
Redcar Bombers		2009 (Into Tyne Tees)
Tyne Tees Tigers		2012 – 2018 (Moved to the SARFL)

==== South ====
Club	Colours	Years competed
Portsmouth Pirates		2009–
Southampton Titans		2007–
Sussex Swans		1991–

Former Teams

Club	Colours	Years competed
Bournemouth Demons		2007–2013
Chippenham Redbacks		2009 – 2016 (Moved to WARFL)
Guildford Crows		2010–2013
Plymouth Seagulls		2011–2012
Swindon Devils		
Thanet Bombers		2006–2007

== Grand final results ==
=== Pre-divisional structure ===
- 1990 Wandsworth 10.10 (70) d. Earls Court 9.14 (68)
- 1991 Earls Court 18.15 (123) d. Wandsworth 12.15 (87)
- 1992 Wandsworth 12.5 (77) d. West London 11.9 (75)
- 1993 London Hawks 12.13 (85) d. Lea Valley 6.5 (41)
- 1994 London Hawks 15.8 (98) d. West London 8.11 (59)
- 1995 Wandsworth 17.13 (115) d. West London 6.5 (41)
- 1996 Wimbledon 11.8 (74) d. West London 6.11 (47)
- 1997 Wandsworth 7.11 (53) d. Wimbledon 7.10 (52)
- 1998 Wimbledon 11.8 (74) d. Wandsworth 7.2 (44)
- 1999 Wandsworth 14.10 (94) d. West London 14.5 (89)
- 2000 West London 11.12 (78) d. Wandsworth 5.2 (32)

=== Divisional structure ===
Year	London Premiership	London Conference	London Social	London Women's Premiership	London Women's Conference	Central & North England	Southern England
2001	North London 10.7 (67) d. Wimbledon 6.9 (45)	Shepherds Bush d. Regents Park					
2002	North London 18.11 (119) d. West London 8.5 (53)	Shepherds Bush d. Regents Park					
2003	Wandsworth 11.11 (77) d. West London 9.8 (62)	Shepherds Bush 11.8 (74) d. Clapham Demons 7.6 (48)				Bristol Dockers 13.19 (97) d. Reading Roos 9.7 (61)	
2004	West London 14.12 (96) d. Wimbledon 5.2 (32)	Shepherds Bush 18.19 (127) d. Putney Magpies 9.4 (58)				Reading Roos 28.20 (188) d. Bristol Dockers 1.6 (12)	
2005	West London 9.14 (68) d. Wimbledon 9.7 (61)	Shepherds Bush 11.12 (78) d. Clapham Demons 11.9 (75)				Nottingham 10.9 (69) d. Bristol Dockers 8.6 (54)	
2006	West London 18.11 (119) d. Wimbledon 2.6 (18)	Shepherds Bush 5.11 (41) d. Clapham 4.3 (27)				Reading 22.20 (152) d. Nottingham 6.7 (43)	
2007	West London Wildcats 16.17 (113) d. Wandsworth Demons 3.2 (20)						
2008	West London Wildcats 13.8 (86) def Putney Magpies 4.3 (27)						
2009	West London Wildcats 11.8 (74) d. Wandsworth Demons 10.7 (67)	Clapham Demons d. Shepherds Bush Raiders	South London Demons d. Ealing Emus				
2010	Wandsworth Demons 15.15 (105) d. Putney Magpies 4.7 (31)	Shepherds Bush Raiders d. Clapham Demons	Ealing Emus d. South London Demons			Manchester Mosquitoes d. Nottingham Scorpions	
2011	West London Wildcats 13.11 (89) d. Wandsworth Demons 8.9 (57)	Shepherds Bush Raiders 17.4 (106) d. Clapham Demons 9.13 (67)	South London Demons 3.11 (29) d. Ealing Emus 3.4 (22)			Nottingham Scorpions d. Huddersfield Rams	
2012	North London Lions 8.8 (56) d. Wandsworth Demons 8.7 (55)	Shepherds Bush Raiders 11.11 (77) d. Regents Park Lions 12.3 (75)	Reading Roos 8.9 (57) d. Balham Hawks 3.4 (22)			Manchester Mosquitoes d. Nottingham Scorpions	
2013	West London Wildcats 10.10 (70) d. North London Lions 9.6 (60)	Shepherds Bush Raiders 9.5 (59) d. Regents Park Lions 5.12 (42)	Reading Roos 6.5 (41) d. Ealing Emus 3.6 (24)			Leeds Minotaurs d. Manchester Mosquitoes	
2014	West London Wildcats 14.13 (97) d. Wandsworth Demons 8.10 (58)	Shepherds Bush Raiders 14.9 (93) d. Clapham Demons 2.4 (16)	Ealing Emus 4.7 (31) d. South East London Giants 4.6 (30)			Manchester Mosquitoes d. Huddersfield Rams	
2015	North London Lions 8.9 (57) d. West London Wildcats 8.8 (56)	Shepherds Bush Raiders 8.20 (68) d. Bounds Green Lions 5.5 (35)	South London Demons 7.4 (46) d. Ealing Emus 1.9 (14)	Wandsworth Demons 5.3 (33) d. Wimbledon Hawks 1.2 (8)		Manchester Mosquitoes d. Sheffield Thunders	
2016	West London Wildcats 14.10 (94) d. Wandsworth Demons 7.3 (43)	Clapham Demons 8.2 (50) d. Shepherds Bush Raiders 7.5 (47)	South London Demons 8.10 (58) d. Reading Roos 3.2 (20)	Wimbledon Hawks 10.5 (65) d. North London Lions 0.0 (0)		Manchester Mosquitoes d. Nottingham Scorpions	Sussex Swans d. Southampton Titans
2017	Wandsworth Demons 4.14 (38) d. North London Lions 5.5 (35)	Shepherds Bush Raiders 7.8 (50) d. Clapham Demons 4.5 (29)	South London Demons 6.5 (41) d. Bounds Green Lions 1.3 (9)	Wandsworth Demons 6.2 (38) d. South East London Giants 0.1 (1)	West London Wildcats 4.8 (32) d. Clapham Demons 0.1 (1)	Manchester Mosquitoes 16.13 (109) d. Nottingham Scorpions 9.12 (66)	
2018	Wandsworth Demons 8.13 (61) d. West London Wildcats 9.6 (60)	Shepherds Bush Raiders 7.9 (51) d. Clapham Demons 4.5 (29)	South London Demons 7.5 (47) d. Bounds Green Lions 1.4 (10)	Wandsworth Demons 5.3 (33) d. North London Lions 1.5 (11)	Clapham Demons 1.3 (9) d. London Swans 1.2 (8)	Manchester Mosquitoes 16.11 (107) d. Nottingham Scorpions 12.10 (82)	

== National teams ==
AFL England also co-ordinate four representative teams:

For Great Britain, the Great Britain Bulldogs and the Great Britain Swans who have competed at the Australian Football International Cup and the AFL Europe Championship and against other national sides in International Friendlies. Organisation of these teams is assisted by the WARFL and the SARFL.

Representing England are a men's team (England Dragonslayers) and a women's team (England Vixens). These compete in AFL Europe competitions, notably the Euro Cup.

== See also ==
- AFL London
- Australian Rules Football in England
- Australian rules football in Scotland
- Australian rules football in the United Kingdom
