= AFL London =

Australian rules football league

- Formerly: British Australian Rules Football League (BARFL)
- Sport: Australian rules football
- Founded: 1989
- First season: 1990
- President: Sarah Howell and Marianna Graham
- No. of teams: 9
- Country: England
- Most recent champion: West London Wildcats (13th premiership flag)
- Most titles: West London Wildcats (13 premiership flags)
- International cup: AFL Europe Champions League
- Related competitions: AFL England; AFL Europe
- Website: afllondon.com

AFL London is one of the largest organised Australian rules football leagues outside Australia. The league organises multiple grades of full 18-a-side games across London, United Kingdom.

The competition provides many Australians who live and work in London the opportunity to experience football competitively, while appealing to residents of non-AFL playing nations living in the London including the British, Irish, South African, American, Canadian, Italian and other Europeans.

The league is currently made up of eight clubs, across three levels of competition (Premiership, Conference and Social) that participate in a competition running from April to August.

== History ==
First formed in 1989 by John Jelly (Journalist), Andrew Zweck (Harvey Goldsmiths), Martyn Hughes (Cleveland Capital Management) Founder London Hawks and helod First meeting for Wandsworth Demons AFL London was born. BARFL simply stood for the British Australian Rules Football League. The inaugural season was held in 1990 and featured eight teams; the London Hawks, West London Wildcats, North London Lions, Earls Court Kangaroos, Lea Valley Saints, Thames Valley Magpies, Wandsworth Demons and the Leicester-based East Midland Eagles. Of these eight foundation teams, West London, North London, London Hawks (NKA Wimbledon Hawks) and Wandsworth continue to compete in the league.

In 2001 AFL London was expanded to incorporate two levels of competition, known as the Premiership and Conference competitions. In addition, due to growing interest and numbers, a Social grade competition was added in 2007.

2008 saw an organisational restructure of Australian Rules Football in the UK, with the BARFL redeveloped to become AFL Britain. This change came about as a way of focusing the efforts of the organisation on supporting the growth of the game both in and outside the capital. It was at this time that the London competition was rebranded as AFL London.

In 2015 a women's competition was introduced, including three of the foundation teams; Wandsworth Demons, North London Lions and Wimbledon Hawks, and the Peckham-based South East London Giants. This was expanded in 2017 into two divisions of four women's teams, with the addition of teams from the West London Wildcats, London Swans, Putney Magpies, and a second side from Wandsworth.

== Clubs ==
=== Locations ===
Greater London Australian Football Clubs
South East England, UK

=== Men ===
Club	Colours	Nickname	Home Ground	Est.	Years in LAFL	Premierships	
Club	Colours	Nickname	Home Ground	Est.	Years in LAFL	Total	Most recent
Premiership
North London		Lions	O R Tambo Recreation Ground, Haringey	1990	1990-	5	2021
Wandsworth		Demons	Clapham Common, Clapham	1990	1990-	13	2026
West London		Wildcats	Dukes Meadows, Chiswick	1990	1990-	12	2022
Conference
Clapham (Wandsworth seconds)		Demons	Clapham Common, Clapham	1998	1998-	4	2024
London (Sussex 1991-2006)		Swans	Hackney Marshes, Hackney	1991	1991-	4	2026
Shepherds Bush (West London seconds)		Raiders	Dukes Meadows, Chiswick	2000	2000-	17	2019
Wimbledon		Hawks	Motspur Park, Wimbledon	1990	1990-	4	1998
Social
Ealing (West London thirds)		Emus	Dukes Meadows, Chiswick	2008	2008-	4	2021
London (Sussex 1991-2006)		Swans	Hackney Marshes, Hackney	1991	1991-	3	2025
Bounds Green (North London seconds)		Lions	O R Tambo Recreation Ground, Haringey	2008	2008-	0	-
Reading		Kangaroos	King's Meadow, Reading	2003	2003-	2	2013
South London (Wandsworth thirds)		Demons	Clapham Common, Clapham	1990	1990-	5	2019
South East London (Dulwich 2008-11)		Giants	Peckham Rye, Southwark	2008	2008-	1	2024
Sussex		Swans	University of Brighton Sports Centre, Brighton	2020	2020-	0	-
Wimbledon		Hawks	Motspur Park, Wimbledon	1990	1990-	4	1998

=== Women ===
Club	Colours	Nickname	Home Ground	Est.	Years in LAFL	Premierships	
Club	Colours	Nickname	Home Ground	Est.	Years in LAFL	Total	Most recent
Premiership
London		Swans	Hackney Marshes, Hackney	1991	1991-	3	2024
Sussex		Swans	University of Brighton Sports Centre, Brighton	2020	2020-	1	2021
Wandsworth		Demons	Clapham Common, Clapham	1990	1990-	4	2026
West London		Wildcats	Dukes Meadows, Chiswick	1990	1990-	4	2025
Wimbledon		Hawks	Motspur Park, Wimbledon	1990	1990-	3	2025
Conference
London		Swans	Hackney Marshes, Hackney	1991	1991-	3	2024
North London		Lions	O R Tambo Recreation Ground, Haringey	1990	1990-	1	2019
South East London		Giants	Peckham Rye, Southwark	2008	2008-	0	-
Wandsworth		Demons	Clapham Common, Clapham	1990	1990-	4	2021
West London		Wildcats	Dukes Meadows, Chiswick	1990	1990-	4	2025

=== 2026 divisions ===
Club	Men's Premiership	Men's Conference	Men's Social	Women's Premiership	Women's Conference	Total
London		Yes	Yes	Yes	Yes	4
North London	Yes		Yes		Yes	3
Reading			Yes			1
South East London			Yes		Yes	2
Sussex			Yes	Yes		2
Wandsworth	Yes	Yes	Yes	Yes	Yes	5
West London	Yes	Yes	Yes	Yes	Yes	5
Wimbledon		Yes	Yes	Yes		3

== Former clubs ==
Club	Colours	Nickname	Location	Est.	Years in LAFL	Premierships		Fate
Club	Colours	Nickname	Location	Est.	Years in LAFL	Total	Years	Fate
Bristol		Dockers	Bristol	1991	1991-2010	0	-	Moved to Wales ARFL in 2011
Earl's Court		Kangaroos	Earl's Court	1990	1990-?	1	1991	Folded
East Midland		Eagles	Leicester	1990	1990-?	0	-	Folded
Lea Valley		Saints		1990	1990-?	0	-	Folded
Portsmouth		Pirates	Warblington School, Warblington	2019	2019-?	0	-	Folded
Putney		Magpies	Richardson Evans Memorial Playing Fields, Putney Vale	1999	1999-2020	0	-	Folded after 2020 season
Thames Valley		Magpies		1990	1990-?	0	-	Folded

== Premiership Winners ==
The following teams have won the competition:

=== Pre-divisional structure ===
- 1990 Wandsworth 10.10 (70) d. Earls Court 9.14 (68)
- 1991 Earls Court 18.15 (123) d. Wandsworth 12.15 (87)
- 1992 Wandsworth 12.5 (77) d. West London 11.9 (75)
- 1993 London Hawks 12.13 (85) d. Lea Valley 6.5 (41)
- 1994 London Hawks 15.8 (98) d. West London 8.11 (59)
- 1995 Wandsworth d. West London
- 1996 Wimbledon d. West London
- 1997 Wandsworth 7.11 (53) d. Wimbledon 7.10 (52)
- 1998 Wimbledon 11.8 (74) d. Wandsworth 7.2 (44)
- 1999 Wandsworth 14.10 (94) d. West London 14.5 (89)
- 2000 West London 11.12 (78) d. Wandsworth 5.2 (32)

=== Divisional structure ===
Year	London Premiership	London Conference	London Social	London Women's Premiership	London Women's Conference
2001	North London 10.7 (67) d. Wimbledon 6.9 (45)	Shepherds Bush 10.6 (66) d. Regents Park 8.10 (58)			
2002	North London 18.11 (119) d. West London 8.5 (53)	Shepherds Bush 11.10 (76) d. Regents Park 11.8 (74)			
2003	Wandsworth 11.11 (77) d. West London 9.8 (62)	Shepherds Bush 11.8 (74) d. Clapham 7.6 (48)			
2004	West London 14.12 (96) d. Wimbledon 5.2 (32)	Shepherds Bush 18.19 (127) d. Putney 9.4 (58)			
2005	West London 9.14 (68) d. Wimbledon 9.7 (61)	Shepherds Bush 11.12 (78) d. Clapham 11.9 (75)			
2006	West London 18.11 (119) d. Wimbledon 2.6 (18)	Shepherds Bush 5.11 (41) d. Clapham 4.3 (27)			
2007	West London 16.17 (113) d. Wandsworth 3.2 (20)	Shepherds Bush 10.13 (73) d. Clapham 4.2 (26)			
2008	West London 13.8 (86) d. Putney 4.3 (27)	Shepherds Bush d. Clapham	Ealing d. Nottingham		
2009	West London 11.8 (74) d. Wandsworth 10.7 (67)	Clapham 8.5 (53) d. Shepherds Bush 5.7 (37)	South London d. Ealing		
2010	Wandsworth 15.15 (105) d. Putney 4.7 (31)	Shepherds Bush 12.9 (81) d. Clapham 7.3 (45)	Ealing d. South London		
2011	West London 13.11 (89) d. Wandsworth 8.9 (57)	Shepherds Bush 17.4 (106) d. Clapham 9.13 (67)	South London 3.11 (29) d. Ealing 3.4 (22)		
2012	North London 8.8 (56) d. Wandsworth 8.7 (55)	Shepherds Bush 11.11 (77) d. Regents Park 12.3 (75)	Reading 8.9 (57) d. Balham 3.4 (22)		
2013	West London 10.10 (70) d. North London 9.6 (60)	Shepherds Bush 9.5 (59) d. Regents Park 5.12 (42)	Reading 6.5 (41) d. Ealing 3.6 (24)		
2014	West London 14.13 (97) d. Wandsworth 8.10 (58)	Shepherds Bush 14.9 (93) d. Clapham 2.4 (16)	Ealing 4.7 (31) d. South East London 4.6 (30)		
2015	North London 8.9 (57) d. West London 8.8 (56)	Shepherds Bush 8.20 (68) d. Bounds Green 5.5 (35)	South London 7.4 (46) d. Ealing 1.9 (14)	Wandsworth 5.3 (33) d. Wimbledon 1.2 (8)	
2016	West London 14.10 (94) d. Wandsworth 7.3 (43)	Clapham 8.2 (50) d. Shepherds Bush 7.5 (47)	South London 8.10 (58) d. Reading 3.2 (20)	Wimbledon 10.5 (65) d. North London 0.0 (0)	
2017	Wandsworth 4.14 (38) d. North London 5.5 (35)	Shepherds Bush 7.8 (50) d. Clapham 4.5 (29)	South London 6.5 (41) d. Bounds Green 1.3 (9)	Wandsworth 6.2 (38) d. South East London Giants 0.1 (1)	West London 4.8 (32) d. Clapham 0.1 (1)
2018	Wandsworth 8.13 (61) d. West London 9.6 (60)	Shepherds Bush 7.9 (51) d. Clapham 4.5 (29)	South London 7.5 (47) d. Bounds Green 1.4 (10)	Wandsworth 5.3 (33) d. North London 1.5 (11)	Clapham 1.3 (9) d. London Swans 1.2 (8)
2019	West London d. Wandsworth	Shepherds Bush d. Wimbledon	South London d. Ealing	North London d. Wandsworth	London Swans d. Clapham
2021	North London 5.10 (40) d West London 4.7 (31)	London Swans 4.3 (27) d Wandsworth 1.6 (12)	Ealing 2.8 (20) d Wandsworth 2.2 (14)	Wandsworth 2.1 (13) d West London 1.2 (8)	Sussex 10.12 (72) d Wandsworth 0.0 (0)
2022	West London 7.6 (48) d. North London 6.11 (47)	London Swans 9.7 (61) d. Shepherds Bush Raiders 7.7 (49)	Sussex 2.6 (18) d. Wandsworth Demons 0.8 (8)	West London 1.8 (14) d Wandsworth 1.3 (9)	Wimbledon 8.14 (62) d Wandsworth 0.0 (0)
2023	Wandsworth 9.9 (63) d West London 7.13 (55)	Wandsworth 9.8 (62) d London Swans 7.5 (47)	Wandsworth 8.2 (50) d Ealing Emus 0.2 (2)	West London 1.8 (14) d Wandsworth 2.1 (13)	London Swans 2.3 (15) d South East London Giants 0.1 (1)
2024	Wandsworth 11.14 (80) d West London 6.6 (42)	Wandsworth 10.6 (66) d Wimbledon 4.3 (27)	South East London Giants 8.8 (56) d Wandsworth 6.1 (37)	West London 5.10 (40) d Wandsworth 1.0 (6)	London Swans 3.4 (22) d South East London Giants 1.2 (8)
2025	Wandsworth 14.10 (94) d North London 8.7 (55)	London Swans 7.15 (57) d Wimbledon 3.6 (24)	Wandsworth 5.0 (30) d London Swans 3.6 (24)	West London 2.8 (20) d Wandsworth 1.2 (8)	Wimbledon 3.5 (23) d North London 1.2 (8)
2026	Wandsworth 7.14 (56) d North London 6.12 (48)	London Swans 5.11 (42) d Wandsworth 2.6 (18)	London Swans 13.8 (86) d Wandsworth 2.5 (17)	Wandsworth 4.4 (28) d London Swans 2.6 (18)	SEL Giants 2.8 (20) d North London 1.0 (6)

- Shepherds Bush Raiders and Ealing Emus are West London's second and third teams respectively
- Regent's Park Lions and Bounds Green Lions are North London's second and third teams respectively
- Clapham Demons and South London Demons are Wandsworth's second and third teams respectively.

== Best and Fairest ==
The Best & Fairest awards in each division celebrate outstanding players each season, as voted on by umpires at the conclusion of each game.

Year	Premiership	Conference	Social	Women's Prem.	Women's Conf.
2019	David Allitt (West London Wildcats)	Ian Ash (London Swans)	Nick Bucovaz (Reading Roos)	Stephanie Filby (North London Lions)	Dee Kelly (Putney Magpies)
2018	Paul Fry (North London Lions)	Harrison Pearce (Clapham Demons)	Simon Kenny (Bounds Green Lions)	Kyle Russo (North London Lions)	Dee Kelly (Putney Magpies)
2017	Andy Challis (West London Wildcats)	Harrison Pearce (Clapham Demons)	Matt Pike (Ealing Emus)	Lisa Wilson (Wimbledon Hawks)	Jessie Humble (West London Wildcats)
2016	Andy Challis (West London Wildcats), Cameron Perry (Wandsworth Demons) & Nik Schoenmakers (North London Lions)	Tim Kear (Shepherds Bush Raiders)			
2015	Lloyd Williams (West London Wildcats)	Chad Sellenger (Shepherds Bush Raiders)	Trav White (Reading Roos)	Jess Edwards (Wandsworth Demons)	
2014	Trent Georgiou (Wandsworth Demons)	Jimmy Gottschalk (Shepherds Bush Raiders) & Jimmy Boot (Regents Park Lions)	Nathan Grindall (Reading Roos)		
2013	Joel Moloney (Putney Magpies)	Matt Halacas (Regents Park Lions)			

== See also ==
- AFL Europe
- AFL England
- Australian Rules Football in England
