= Shepherds Bush Raiders =

Australian rules football team based in London, England

Names
- Full name: Shepherds Bush Raiders
- Nickname(s): The Raiders, Der's, Bush Raiders

2022 season
- Home-and-away season: 2nd
- Leading goalkicker: Rhett Kerr
- Best and fairest: Drew Parker

Club details
- Founded: 2000
- Colours: Green and Gold
- Competition: AFL London Conference
- President: Jonathan Carter
- Coach: Chris McDougall
- Captain: Drew Parker
- Premierships: 17
- Ground: Chiswick Rugby Club

Other information

The Shepherds Bush Raiders is an Australian rules football team based in London, England. The club was formed as part of the West London Wildcats in 2000, and compete in the Conference division of the AFL London.

== History ==
The Shepherds Bush Raiders were formed in 2000, and for the first year competed in the Premiership division of the then BARFL. While the Raiders did not qualify for finals, the season was a success for the new club.

In 2001, the Conference division was created, effectively a second division for the BARFL, and it was here that the Raiders thrived. The Raiders proceeded to win every premiership from 2001 to 2008, before falling agonisingly short in 2009.

In 2010 the Raiders returned to form, completing the season undefeated as Premiers and Champions. Since 2010, the club has added another 5 premierships to its history including another undefeated Premiers and Champions season in 2014.

== Honour Board ==
Year	Position	Coach	Captain	B & F	Best Finals Player	Leading Goalkicker
2000	6th	David McAdam	Paul Toll	Pete Conquest	N/A	Juston Sanson
2001	1st	Troy Sheers	Jason Dwyer	Jarrod Dean	Justin Shannon	Troy Sheers
2002	1st	Nigel Dransfield	Tomas O'Mongain & Robert Appleton	Justin Shannon	Lee Jones	Jimmy Kelly
2003	1st	Nigel Dransfield	Robert Appleton	Gus Waddell	Gus Waddell	Jimmy Kelly
2004	1st	Robert Appleton	Gus Waddell	Gus Waddell	Will Ainsworth	Mark Rudd
2005	1st	Todd Beaton	Stephen Cahill	Paul Donahoo	Dan Morrison	Mark Rudd
2006	1st	Ross Giardana	Dan Morrison	Josh Ancrum	Ryan Everett	Mark Rudd
2007	1st	Paul Donahoo	Paul Donahoo	Clint Johnston	Nathan Costley	Clint Johnston
2008	1st	Paul Donahoo	Travis Stevens	Jono Watson	Kade Nicholls	Scott Carson
2009	2nd	Craig Marshall & Shaun Truscott	Adam Hall	Luke Faull	Matty Ryan	Clint Pattinson
2010	1st	Craig Marshall	Craig Marshall & Adam Hall	Matty Ryan	Aaron Kempe	Trent Robertson
2011	1st	Craig Marshall	Evan Scicluna	Fergus Adamson	David Jackson	Craig Marshall and Luke Kenelly
2012	1st	Craig Marshall	Evan Scicluna	TBC	TBC	TBC
2013	1st	Evan Scicluna	Kevin Upton	TBC	TBC	Kevin Upton
2014	1st	James Ford	Kevin Upton	Nick Bowman	TBC	Kevin Upton
2015	1st	David Emerson and Christopher Banting	Chad Sellenger	Ben McCrorey	Clint Johnson	Chad Sellenger
2016	1st	Jared Risol	Chad Sellenger	Luke Moore	Luke Moore	Chad Sellenger
2017	1st	Andy Challis	Chad Sellenger	Matthew Abraham	Brennan Mills	Tim Wtkear
2018	1st	X	Daniel Clifford	Taylor McKenzie	Matt Ness	Daniel Clifford
2019	1st	Liam McColl and Benny Sykes	Adam Bennion	Paul Blight	Harry Thompson	Scott Michel
2021	3rd	Chris McDougall	Drew Parker	Drew Parker	N/A	Mitch Wilson
2022	2rd	Chris McDougall	Drew Parker	Drew Parker	Drew Parker	Rhett Kerr

== Finals ==
2015 Grand Final Conference Division

Shepherds Bush Raiders 8.20 (68) def North London Lions 5.5 (35)

Best: David Abernathy, Clint Johnson, Matt Hamilton, Jimmy Gottschalk, Chad Sellenger

Goals: Jimmy Gottschalk 3, Chad Selenger 2, Nick Fitzgerald 1, ??

2014 Grand Final Conference Division

Shepherds Bush Raiders 14.9 (93) def Clapham Demons 2.4 (16)

Best: Ben McCrorey, David Emerson, Nathan Costley, Kevin Upton, Andrew Bell, Dan Jeffreys

Goals: David Emerson 4, Kevin Upton 3, Evan Scicluna 2, Nathan Costley 2, Dave Little 1, Nick Bowman 1, Tom Gillard 1

2013 Grand Final Conference Division

Shepherds Bush Raiders 9.5 (59) def North London Lions 5.12 (42)

Best: Brad Tinker, Anthony Blackie, Micky O'Connell, Paul Matheson, Dunnie

Goals: Brad Tinker 3, David Emerson 1 Others ???

2010 Grand Final Conference Division

Shepherds Bush Raiders 12.9 (81) def Clapham Demons 7.3 (45)

Best: Aaron 'Sauce' Kempe, Craig 'Marshy' Marshall, Dale Sidebottom, Aaron 'Azza' Sawyers, Andrew 'Gilbo' Gilbert, Matthew 'Angry Turts' Ryan, Matthew 'Happy Turts' Ryan

Goals: Brett 'Tott's' Tottenham 3, Aaron Kempe, Trent 'Robbo Robertson, Troy Cunningham 2, Troy 'Boof' Allen, Toby Boyle, David Furletti 1.

2008 Grand Final Conference Division

Shepherds Bush Raiders 7.12 (54) defeated Clapham Demons 6.11 (47)

Best: Kade 'Giggz' Nichols, Matty Barr, Pete O'Connel, Marcus 'Willo' Wilson, Shane 'Abbo' Albon, Paul 'Chopper' Donahoo

Goals: Marcus 'Willo' Wilson 3, Kade Nichols 3, Paul Donahoo 1

2007 Grand Final Conference Division

Shepherds Bush Raiders 10.3 (73) defeated Clapham Demons 4.3 (27)

Best: Paul 'Chopper' Donahoo, Josh 'Cooky' Ancrum, Stephen 'Fish' Glenn, Nathan 'Coss' Costley, Travis Stephens, David 'Macca' McMurdo, Jono 'Gadget Arms' Watson

Goals: Stephen Glenn, Adam Baker, Craig Marshall 2, Josh Ancrum, Paul Donahoo, Travis Stephens 1.

2006 Grand Final Conference Division

Shepherds Bush Raiders 5.11 (41) defeated Clapham Demons 4.3 (27)

Best: Craig Marshall, Joel 'JD' Daniher, Chris Schelter, Ryan 'Spider' Everett, Aaron 'Rossi' Ross, David McMurdo, Josh Ancrum

Goals: Mark Rudd, Trinity Ambler 2, Dan Morrison 1

2005 Grand Final Conference Division

Shepherds Bush Raiders 11.12 (78) defeated Wimbledon Hawks 11.9 (75)

Best: Damien 'Nutta' Stewart, Brendan Drake, Steele Morrell, James 'Jimmy' Leigh (for after siren winning goal), Bret 'Burn' Pedlow, Dan Morrison

Goals: Mark Rudd 3, Trinity Ambler, James Leigh, Brendan Drake 2, Andrew 'Rowdy' Wood, Paul Donahoo 1

2004 BARFL Grand Final Conference Division

Shepherds Bush Raiders 18.19 (127) defeated Putney Magpies 9.4 (58)

Best: Matt Boyd, Will Ainsworth, Andrew Jacobs, Dan Morrison, Ben Statton, Joel Daniher, Todd Beaton

Goals: Mark Rudd, Andrew Jacobs 3, Shaun McKenzie, Kane Stewart 2, Robert Appleton, Andrew Wood, Ben Statton, Luke Sharry, Will Ainsworth, Matt Boyd, Mick Condon, Dan Morrison 1

2003 BARFL Grand Final Conference Division

Shepherds Bush Raiders 11.8 (74) defeated Clapham Demons 7.6 (48)

Best: Dan Morrison, Angus Waddell, Gerry Nimmo, Jase Hughey, Ben Black, Geoff Whitworth, Drew Walker, Nigel Dransfield

Goals: Angus Waddell 5, Graeme Pratt 2, Nigel Dransfield, Robert Appleton, Dan Morrison 1

2002 BARFL Grand Final Conference Division

Shepherds Bush Raiders 11.10 (76) defeated Regents Park 11.8 (74)

Best: Lee 'LJ' Jones, Mark Harmer, Shane Kitts, Jon 'Jack' Jess, Graeme Pratt

Goals: Graeme Pratt, Leigh Jones, Dean Ruffel 2, Stuart Shuttleworth, James Kell, Jon Jess, Darren 'Pluger' Isaacs 1

2001 Inaugural BARFL Grand Final Conference Division

Shepherds Bush Raiders 10.6 (66) defeated Regents Park 8.10 (58)

Best: Jarrod Dean, Jason 'Smurf' Dwyer, Chris 'Richo' Richmond, Brad 'Sniffa' Lyon

Goals: Troy 'Clicka' Shears 3, Jarrod Dean, Chris Richmond 2
