= West London Wildcats =

Australian rules football and netball club based in London, England

West London Wildcats Australian Rules Football & Netball Club
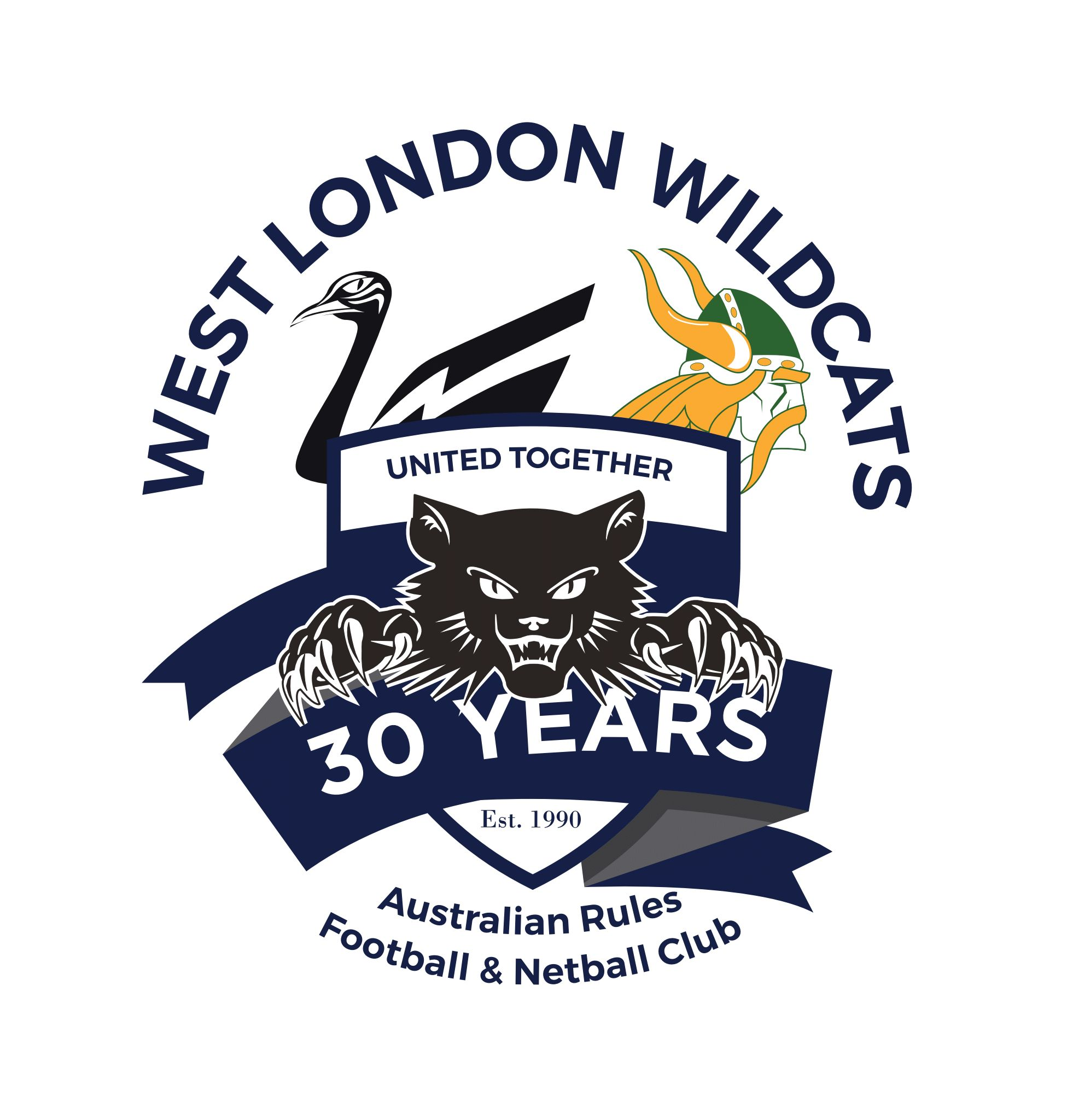

Names
- Full name: West London Wildcats Australian Rules Football & Netball Club
- Nickname(s): Wildcats, Cats, Catters
- Club song: "Oh we're from Wildcat Land..."

2025 season
- After finals: Men's: 3nd Women's: Premiers
- Home-and-away season: Men's: 3nd Women's: 2nd
- Leading goalkicker: Men's: Ted Clayton; Women's: Iona Williams
- Best and fairest: Men's: Sam Threlfall; Women's: Jess Cottrell

Club details
- Founded: 1990
- Colours: Navy and White
- Competition: AFL London Premiership
- President: Jonathan Carter
- Coach: Men's: Sam Threlfall; Women's: Travis Thornley
- Captain(s): Men's: Matt Spezza; Women's: Shannon May
- Premierships: 43 AFL Europe Champions League: 4 (2015–2018); AFL London Men's Premiership: 13 (2000, 2004–09, 2011,2013–14, 2016, 2019, 2022); Men's Conference: 17 (2001–08, 2010–2015, 2017–2019); Women's Premiership: 4 (2022–2025); Women's Conference: 1 (2017); Men's Social: 4 (2008, 2010, 2014, 2021)
- Ground: Chiswick Rugby Club, Dukes Meadow, London, W4 2SH

Other information

The West London Wildcats is an Australian rules football and netball club based in London, England. The club fields teams in each of the three men's AFL London divisions – Premiership, Conference and Social and each of the two women's divisions – Premiership and Conference. The men's reserves team is known as the Shepherds Bush Raiders and wear a green and gold guernsey, while the Social team is known as the Ealing Emus and wear a black, red and yellow guernsey.

The Wildcats are regarded as the most successful Australian rules football club in Europe, and outside of Australia, tallying 43 premierships in the club's history.

== History ==
The West London Wildcats were formed in 1990 as a foundation club of the British Australian Rules Football League, now known as the AFL London division of AFL Britain. They have played in a number of BARFL grand finals, finally winning their first premiership in 2000 against arch-rivals, the Wandsworth Demons, the team captained at the time by club stalwart, Chris Schleter. They have since followed this up with premierships in 2004, 2005 and 2006 all against BARFL heavy-weights the Wimbledon Hawks. 2004 saw fullback Rowan Bilkey captain the club. Chris Schleter again captained the premiers in 2005 while in 2006 Ruckman and Barclay Dixon lead his team to the BARFL premiership. The Wildcats stand as the only team to win the BARFL Premiership on three consecutive occasions. In 2004 the team achieved another first in BARFL history by claiming the BARFL 'Grand Slam', winning the Anzac Cup preseason tournament, the Brit Cup and both the Conference and Premier Division Premierships, a feat they repeated in season 2006.

The Wildcats also field a second team, the Shepherds Bush Raiders, in the AFL London Conference competition, and a third side, the Ealing Emus in the AFL London Social division. The Shepherds Bush Raiders have won all but 4 of the 22 Conference premierships since the competition's inception in 2001.

The West London Wildcats celebrated 25 years of existence in 2014. Capping off a fine year by winning the premiership in all 3 grades and securing a berth in the inaugural Champions League tournament held In Amsterdam. They went on to win this title in 2015 and have followed up with victories in 2016, 2017 & 2018. The Wildcats also competed in the Champions League in 2019, and were due to compete in the COVID cancelled 2020 edition. For the first time in Wildcats history, both Men's and Women's teams will compete in the 2023 tournament as champions of London.

In season 2017, the Wildcats had their inaugural women's AFL team playing in the AFL London Conference Women's division, winning the premiership against the Wandsworth Demons. Due to an influx of interest from women wanting to play the great game, in 2018, the club expanded its women's team to two teams and now competes in the Premier and Conference division.

In 2022, the Wildcats Women won the club's first premiership division premiership, bouncing back from defeat in the 2021 Grand Final. The Wildcats Women Premiership division team has now won 4 consecutive premierships from 2022 to 2025, becoming the first women's team in AFL London to complete this feat.

In addition to Australian Rules Football, the Wildcats netball sides play in a number of competitions across London.

Former Brisbane Bears player Rudi Frigo, recruited to the club by Justin "Dogga" Shannon, is probably the Wildcats best known player.

== Honour Board ==
Year	Position	President	Coach	Captain	Treasurer
1990	3rd	Greg Sporton	Dave Steadman	Peter Murphy & Dave McGain	Ian Mead
1991	4th	Michael Lopes	Dave McGregor	Ian Rakich	David Meaney
1992	2nd	Michael Lopes & Barny Ayris	Mark Reid	Michael Lopes	Barny Ayris & Ewen Hill
1993	5th	Ross Gregory	Mark Reid	Daryn Jamieson	Ewen Hill
1994	2nd	Ross Gregory	Mark Reid	Greg Wylie	Ewen Hill
1995	2nd	Ewen Hill	Graeme Watson	Greg Weston-Arnold	Ross Gregory
1996	2nd	Ewen Hill	Paul Smith	Paul Geddis	Tomas O'Mongain
1997	3rd	Ewen Hill	Darren Isaacs	Paul Geddis	Ross gregory
1998	5th	Darren Isaacs	David McAdam	Denis Radetic & Derek Shaw	Derek Shaw
1999	2nd	Neil Talbot	Russell Warburton	Shane McDonald	Derek Shaw
2000	1st	Neil Talbot	Michael Billing	Chris Schleter	Derek Shaw
2001	3rd	Paul Toll	Michael Billing	Chris Schleter	Derek Shaw
2002	2nd	Justin Shannon	Lachy Boyd & Cameron Aubrey	Greg Atkinson	Derek Shaw
2003	2nd	Justin Shannon	Ross Giardina & Chris Schleter	Chris Schleter	Derek Shaw
2004	1st	Jonathon Grapsas	Ross Giardina & Chris Schleter	Rowan Bilkey	Derek Shaw
2005	1st	Matt Glynn	Ross Giardina	Chris Schleter	Matt Boyd & Derek Shaw
2006	1st	Matt Glynn	Damien Stewart & Ryan Butler	Barclay Dixon	Donna Glynn & Derek Shaw
2007	1st	Matt Glynn	Ross Giardina & Chris Schleter	Sam Heffernan & Damien Stewart	Donna Glynn & Derek Shaw
2008	1st	Matt Glynn	Xavier McKinnon	Matt Chilton	Donna Glynn
2009	1st	Pete Romanis	Justin Main	Dan Nankivell	Anna Rushall
2010	3rd	Ben Bond and Troy Cunningham	Dan Nankivell	Nathan Costley	Troy Cunningham
2011	1st	Ben Bond	Nathan Costley & Dan Prigmore	Steven Puhar	Matt Ryan
2012	4th	Luke Fenney	Nathan Costley & Dan Prigmore	Adam Broadbent	Ciaran Merrigan
2013	1st	Luke Fenney	Nathan Costley & Dan Prigmore	Brad Wedgwood	Ciaran Merrigan
2014	1st	Ben O'Brien & Craig Simpson	Nathan Costley & Dan Prigmore	Matty Shannon	Ciaran Merrigan
2015	2nd	Ben O'Brien & Craig Simpson	Nathan Costley & Keith Della-Vedova	Brad Wedgwood	Ciaran Merrigan
2016	1st	Ben O'Brien & Craig Simpson	Nathan Costley & Keith Della-Vedova	Jared Risol	Scott Downsborough
2017	3rd	Chad Sellenger & Craig Simpson	Keith Della-Vedova & Jared Risol	Andy Challis	Scott Downsborough
2018	2nd	Chad Sellenger	Keith Della-Vedova	Tyson Mihocek	Daniel French
2019	1st	Daniel Clifford	Andrew Walsgott & James Darke	David Allitt & David Rattenbury	Daniel French
2020	No Season – COVID	David Furletti & Daniel Clifford	N/A	N/A	Daniel French & Jonathan Carter
2021	2nd	David Furletti	Paul Blight	Grant King	Jonathan Carter
2022	1st	Jonathan Carter	Paul Blight & Tyson Gray	Max Burmester	Michael Globan
2023	2nd	Jonathan Carter	Paul Blight & Tyson Gray	Josh Marriot & Pete Jones	Michael Globan
2024	2nd	Jonathan Carter	Paul Blight & Tyson Gray	Chris McDougall & Jacob Robinson	Ryan Goldspring
2025	3rd	Jonathan Carter	Sam Threlfall	Matt Spezza	Matt Davies

== Champions League ==
2018 Grand Final West London Wildcats 5.4.34 defeated Amsterdam Devils 2.2.14

2017 Grand Final West London Wildcats 5.7.37 defeated Amsterdam Devils 2.2.14

2016 Grand Final West London Wildcats 5.13.43 defeated Manchester Mosquitos 2.1.13

2015 Grand Final West London Wildcats 8.6.54 defeated Rhineland Lions 1.1.7

== Finals ==
2018 Grand Final Premiership Division West London Wildcats 9.6.60 defeated by Wandsworth Demons 8.13.61

Goals: TBC

Best: Cam Linford, Hugh Sandilands, David Rattenbury, Simon Thomas, Rhett Kerr, Robbie Gore

2018 Grand Final Conference Division Shepherds Bush Raiders 7.9.51 defeated Wandsworth Demons 4.5.29

Goals: TBC

Best: Scott Michell, Matthew Ness, Nathan Costley, Kade Rowbotheram, Tom Donnelly, Josh Morrison, Taylor Mckenzie

AFL London GF Best on Ground Award: Nathan Costley

2017 Grand Final Conference Division Shepherds Bush Raiders 7.8.50 defeated Wandsworth Demons 3.5.23

2017 Grand Final Women's conference Division West London Wildcats 4.8.32 defeated Wandsworth Demons 0.1.1

2016 Grand Final Premiership Division West London Wildcats 14.10.94 Defeated Wandsworth Demons 7.1.43

2015 Grand Final Premiership Division West London Wildcats 8.8 (56) Defeated by North London Lions 8.9 (57)

Goals: TBC

Best: TBC

2014 Grand Final Premiership Division West London Wildcats 14.13 (97) Defeated Wandsworth Demons 8.10 (58)

Goals: David Abernethy 5, Matt Abraham 2, Todd Pfeiffer 2, Brad Collins, Keith Della-Vedova, James Ford, Clint Johnson, Brad Wedgwood

Best: Brad Wedgwood, David Abernethy, Sam Wood, Billy Oswell, Matt Shannon

AFL London GF Best on Ground Award: Brad Wedgwood

2014 Grand Final Conference Division Shepherds Bush Raiders 14.9 (93) Defeated Clapham Demons 2.4 (16)

Goals: David Emerson 4, Kevin Upton 3, Evan Scicluna 2, Nathan Costley 2, Tom Gillard, Nick Graham-Bowman, Dave Little

Best: Ben McCrorey, David Emerson, Nathan Costley, Dan Jeffreys, Adrian Brown, Evan Scicluna

AFL London GF Best on Ground Award: Nathan Costley

2014 Grand Social Premiership Division Ealing Emus 4.7 (31) Defeated South London Demons 4.6 (30)

Goals: Andrew Mann 2, Brad Tinker, Froggy Triplett

Best: Sean Fenney, Scott Fedrici, Brad Tinker, Markus Rees, Sam Furber

2013 Grand Final Premiership Division West London Wildcats 10.10 (70) Defeated North London Lions 9.6 (60)

2013 Grand Final Conference Division Shepherds Bush Raiders 9.5 (59) Defeated Regents Park Lions 5.12 (42)

2012 Grand Final Conference Division Shepherds Bush Raiders 11.11 (77) Defeated Regents Park Lions 12.3 (75)

2011 Grand Final Premiership Division West London Wildcats 13.1(89) Defeated Wandsworth Demons 8.9 (57)

2011 Grand Final Conference Division Shepherds Bush Raiders 17.4 (106) Defeated Clapham Demons 9.13 (67)

2010 Grand Final Conference Division Shepherds Bush Raiders 12.9 (81) def Clapham Demons 7.3 (45)

2010 Grand Social Premiership Division Ealing Emus 7.1 (43) def South London Demons 2.5 (17)

2009 Grand Final Premiership Division

2009 Grand Final Conference Division

2009 Grand Social Premiership Division

2008 Grand Final Premiership Division West London Wildcats 13.8 (86) defeated Putney Magpies 4.3 (27)

Best: Justin 'Maca' McCallion, Ross 'Rosco' Dillon, Leigh 'Burki' Burke, Warrick 'Bloodnut' Fenner, Damien 'Sticky' Lyon, Eoin O'Connor, Xavier 'XMan' McKinnon, Barry 'Baz' Malone

Goals: Leigh Burke, Eoin O'Connor 3, Justin McCallion 2, Sam Miles 1 (others TBC)

Norm Smith Medal: Justin 'Maca' McCallion

2008 Grand Final Conference Division Shepherds Bush Raiders 7.12 (54) defeated Clapham Demons 6.11 (47)

Best: Kade 'Giggz' Nichols, Matty Barr, Pete O'Connel, Marcus 'Willo' Wilson, Shane 'Abbo' Albon, Paul 'Chopper' Donahoo

Goals: Marcus 'Willo' Wilson 3, Kade Nichols 3, Paul Donahoo 1

2008 Grand Final Social Division Ealing Emus 18.17 (125) defeated Nottingham Scorpions 1.5 (11)

Best: Al Carlson, Lucas 'Doof' Cullen, Darryl 'Daz' Dissisto, Pete Kasby, Matt Neville, Ryan 'Rhino' Lapish, John Houston, Simon 'Simmo' Berry

Goals: Al Carlson 4, Wes White 3, Casey Ratcliffe, Ryan 'Rhino' Lapish 2, Darryl 'Daz' Dissisto, Lucas 'Doof' Cullen, Jeremy 'Jez' Lanberg, Paul 'Cutts' Cutler 1 (others TBC)

Norm Smith Medal: Doof

== International Tour Matches ==
The Wildcats have played a number of pre-season tour matches across Europe.

- 2025 AFL Europe Champions League – Women's (3rd)
- 2025 Men's Cork Tournament
- 2024 AFL Europe Champions League – Women's (5th)
- 2023 AFL Europe Champions League – Men's (2nd) and Women's (4th)
- 2022 Dragon Cup Winners – Men's and Women's Divisions
- 2022 Gallia Cup Runner's Up
- 2022 Leprechaun Cup Runner's Up
- 2015 – 2018 AFL Europe Champions League Premiers
- 2011 West London d Copenhagen Barracudas
- 2010 West London d Paris Cockerels
- 5 April 2008 West London 60 d Copenhagen Barracudas 25
- April 2007 West London vs Croatia
- 7 April 2006 West London vs Barcelona Stars
- 9 April 2005 West London 163 d Stockholm Dynamite 51

== Best & Fairest ==
Year	West London Wildcats	Shepards Bush Raiders	Ealing Emus	Women's Prem	Women's Conf
2025	Sam Threlfall	Glen Burns	Luke Buckler	Jess Cottrell	Izzy Gerardi
2024	Ted Clayton	Matt Spezza & Jack Walkton	Ben Collins	Shannon May	Ally Nicholson
2023	Tom Forster	Louis Miller	Grant King	Shannon May	Erin Bunn
2022	Chris McDougall	Drew Parker	Benny Sykes	Dee Kelly	Annabelle Frank
2021	Patrick Robinson	Drew Parker	Stuie Ward	Shannon May	Annabelle Frank
2020	No Competition – COVID				
2019	Cameron O'Leary	Paul Blight	Andrew Guthrie	Ali Sonnefeld	
2018	Cam Linford & James Darke	Taylor McKenzie	James Wilson	Tanaya Redman	Casey Hutcheson
2017	Evan Johnson	Matthew Abraham	Matt Pike	N/A	Jessie Humble
2016	Andy Challis	Luke Moore	Carson Macartney		
2015	Lloyd Williams	Ben McCrorey	Rhys Synoot		
2014	Todd Pfeiffer & Brad Wedgwood	Nick Graham-Bowman	Froggy Triplett		
2013	Gavin Bowles	Brad Tinker	Steve Whibley		
2012	Adam Broadbent	Al Adams	Julian Kasby		
2011	Adam Broadbent	Fergus Adamson	Joel Siwak		
2010	Dan Prigmore	Matty Ryan	Brett Rizio		
2009	Dan Nankivell	Luke Faull	Patty Kearins		
2008	Matt Chilton	Jono Watson	David Harrington		

1997 Matt Lloyd

== End of Season Football Trips ==
Year	Destination	Year	Destination	Year	Destination	Year	Destination
1990	Amsterdam	2000	Corfu	2010	Corfu	2020	COVID
1991	Corfu	2001	Corfu	2011	Corfu	2021	Mykonos & Ios
1992	Faliraki	2002	Corfu	2012	Corfu	2022	Ios
1993	Corfu	2003	Corfu	2013	Corfu	2023	Ios
1994	Dubin	2004	Corfu	2014	Corfu	2024	Lagos, Portugal & San Sebastian
1995	Corfu	2005	Corfu	2015	Corfu	2025	Ios
1996	Black Country, UK	2006	Corfu	2016	Corfu		
1997	Corfu	2007	Corfu	2017	Corfu		
1998	Corfu	2008	Corfu	2018	ios		
1999	Corfu	2009	Lagos	2019	Mykonos & Ios		

== Photos ==
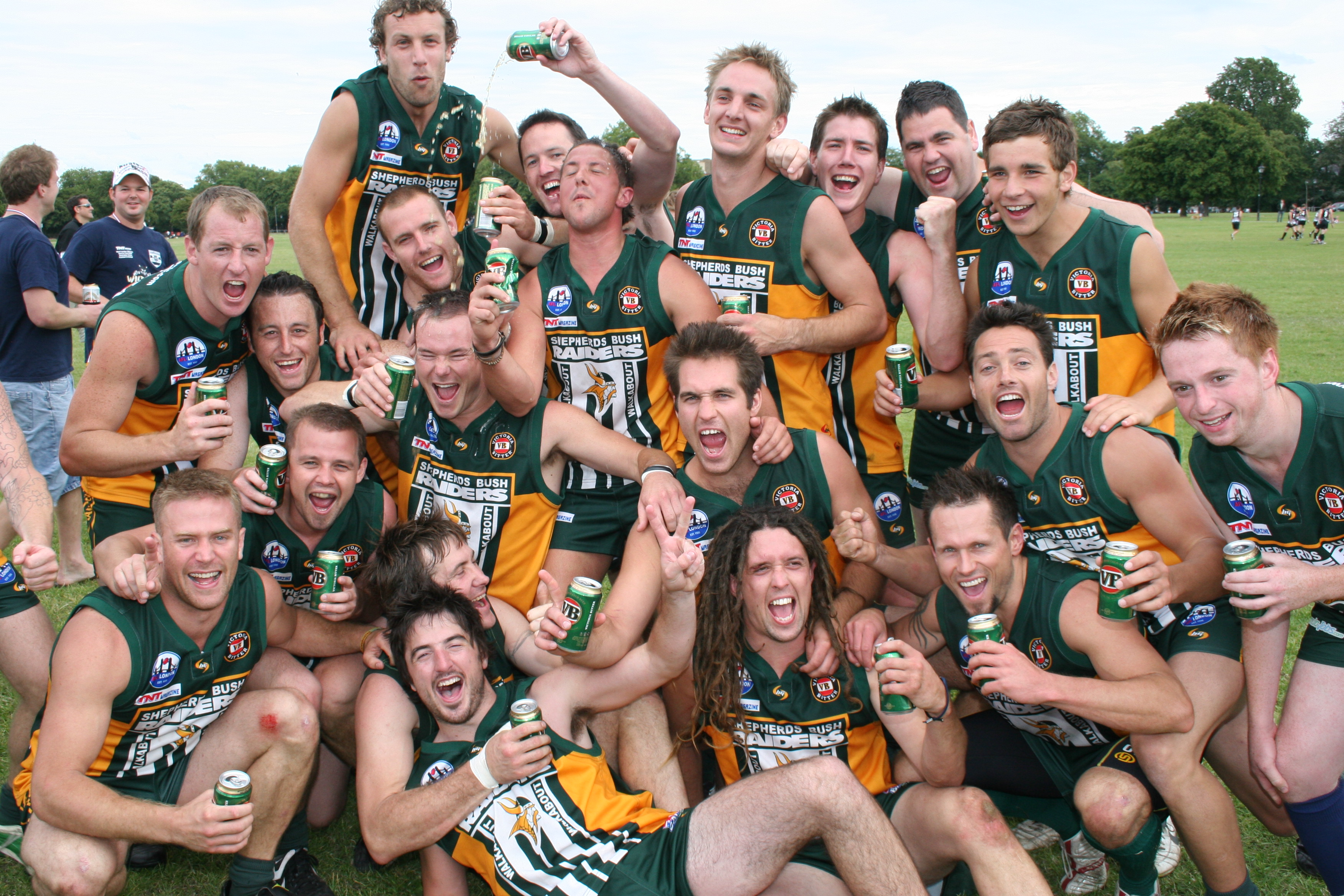
2008 Shepherds Bush Raiders

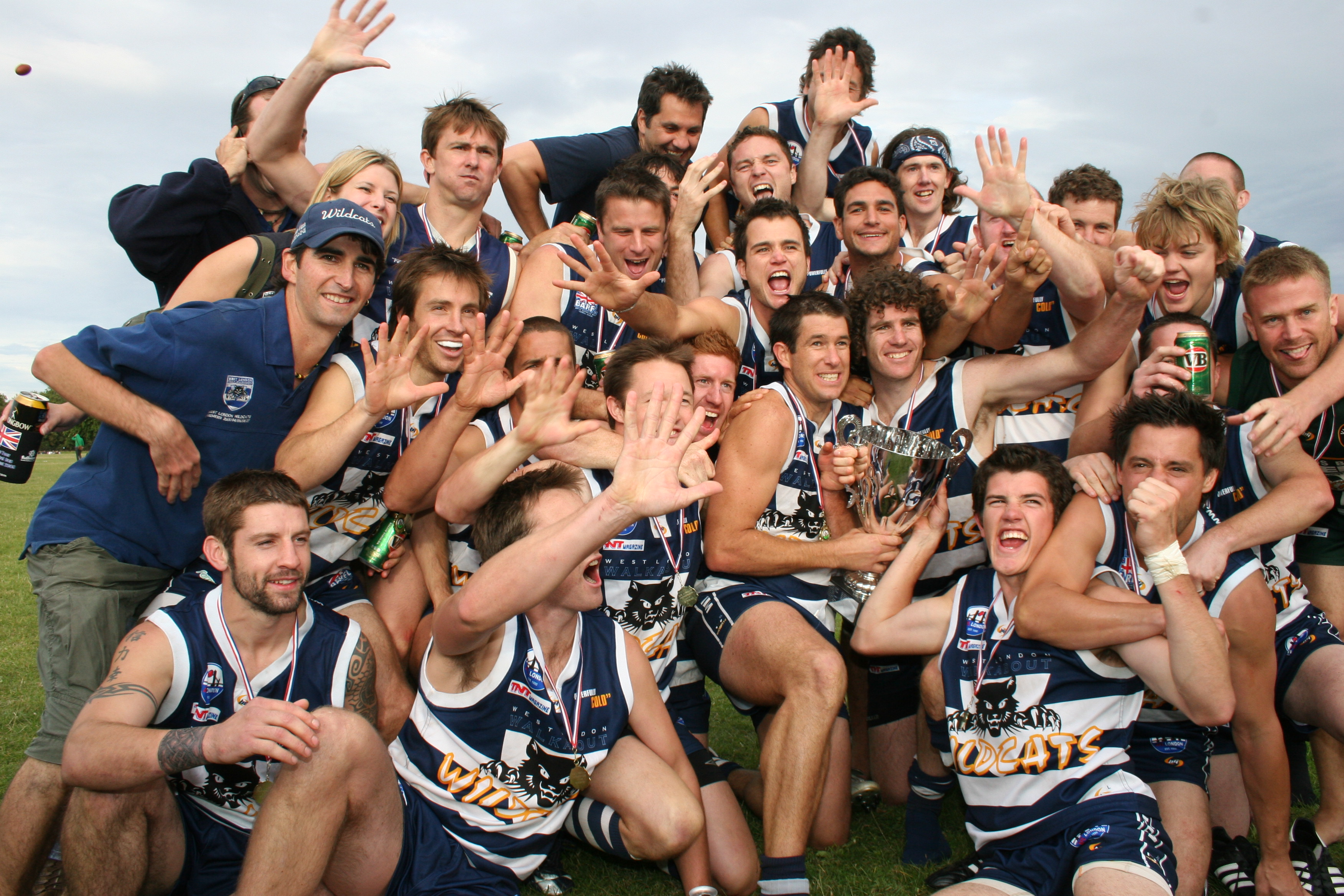
2008 West London Wildcats

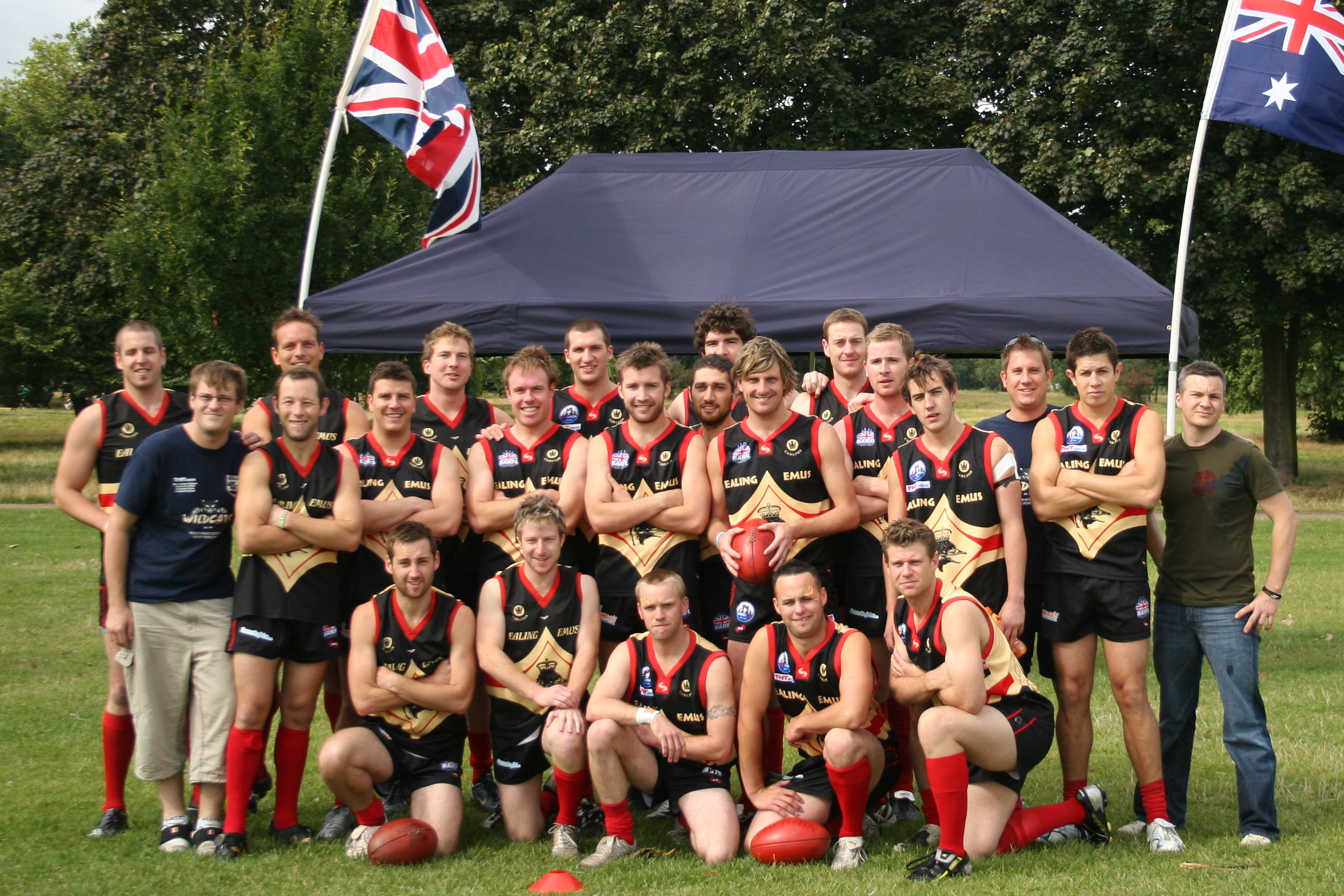
2008 Ealing Emus
