= London Lions (disambiguation) =

London Lions may refer to:

- London Lions (basketball), an English basketball team
- London Lions (women), an English women's basketball team
- London Lions F.C., an English association football team
- London City Lionesses, an English women's association football team
- North London Lions, an Australian football team
- London Lions (inline hockey), an English inline hockey team
- London Lions (ice hockey), a defunct English ice hockey team
- London Lions (speedway), a defunct English motorcycle speedway team
