= South East London Giants =

Australian rules football club based in London, England

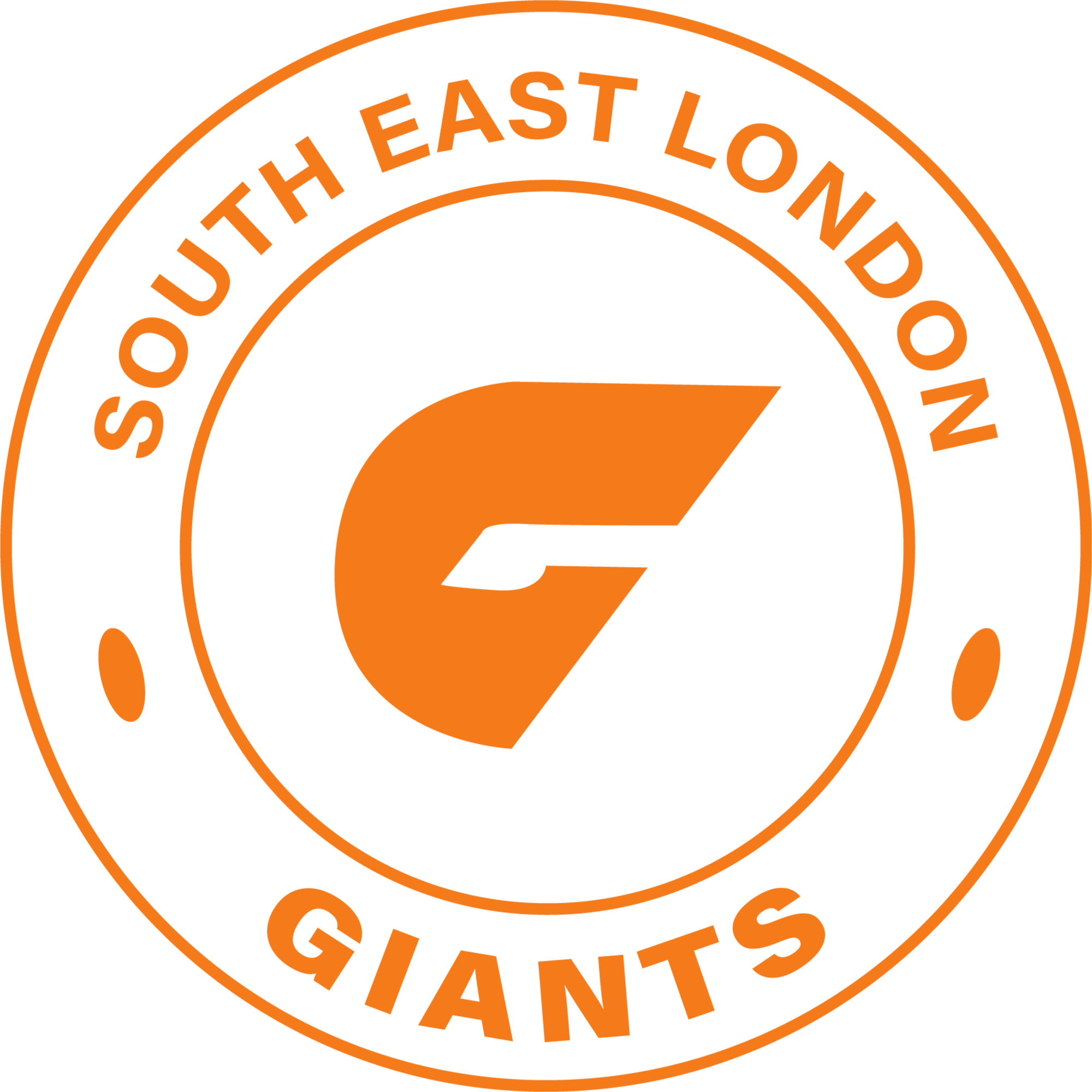

Names
- Full name: South East London Giants
- Former name: Dulwich Dragons
- Nickname(s): Giants, SELG
- Club song: "Well there's a big big sound from South East London town..."

2026 season
- After finals: Mens: 6th Womens: Champions
- Home-and-away season: Mens: 6th Womens: 3rd
- Leading goalkicker: Mens: Geoff MacKay; Womens: El Hyner
- Best and fairest: Mens: Chris "Lingy' Leopardi; Womens: Suzi Taylor

Club details
- Founded: 2012
- Colours: Orange and Black
- Competition: AFL London Men's Social Division and Women's Conference
- President: John Stonehouse
- Coach: Mens: Connor 'Pitbull' Lorrigan; Womens: Danny Fornarino
- Captain(s): Mens: Lachie 'Twain' Stewart; Womens: Alex 'Steve' Stephens
- Premierships: 2 AFL London Men's Socials: 1 (2024); Women's Conference: 1 (2026)
- Ground: Peckham Rye, London SE15 3UA

Other information
- Official website: South East London Giants

The South East London Giants are an Australian rules football club based in Peckham, London, England.

The club has a Men's and Women's team which compete in the AFL London Social Division and Conference respectively. They train and play their home fixtures at Peckham Rye. The club's membership includes immigrants from Australia alongside non-Australians.

The South East London Giants won their first Premiership as their Men's team beat the Wandsworth Demons to take the 2024 AFL London Social Division Premiership. The Women's team won their first Premiership in the 2026 season over the North London Lions.

== History ==
Originally founded as the Dulwich Dragons, the club has competed in the AFL London league since 2007. 2012 saw the club start an affiliation with the Greater Western Sydney Giants to become the South East London Giants.

In 2012 the club fielded one team in the Conference division. The initial season was a tough one for the club with a struggle for numbers on the field and financial pressures leaving it on the verge of being dissolved by the end of the season.

In the early months of 2013 with a complete reorganisation and reboot of the club under new management and a massive push for new recruitment including reaching out to get new players involved who had never heard of the sport before let alone played it. The first preseason training of 2013 saw just six people down at Victoria Park in East London to train in the snow. With a hesitant approval from AFL London, the Giants were given a second chance, this time only competing in the Social division of the league. This season forced the other clubs in the league to reassess the Giants as win followed win and they missed out on a place in the finals by percentage, whilst membership numbers hit a level they had never reached previously.

2014 saw the club determined to hit the ground running. A preseason trip to Sweden to take on the Malmö Giants in a friendly contest was swiftly followed by the Giants hosting and reviving the AFL London Pre-season Cup on its home ground, Peckham Rye. This was the first time in three years that this special one day contest had taken place and the first time the club had taken on the mammoth duty of arranging such a large event. The day was a roaring success with most clubs in the league taking part in the contest and the Giants being praised in the press for putting on such a great event. The home and away season then got under way with the Giants starting with 5 consecutive wins, and undefeated by the halfway point of the season.

Following a successful finals' campaign, the Giants qualified for the AFL London Grand Final for the first time in club history, and even received a video message on the eve of the contest from AFL legend and former GWS coach, Kevin Sheedy. The 2014 Grand Final was a hard-fought and bitter battle that saw the Giants missing out on the top spot in the final moments of the match by just one point.

A founding member of the AFL London Women's league 2015 alongside Wimbledon Hawks, Wandsworth Demons and North London Lions, the club released a custom-made playing kit, fielding men's teams in both the Social and Conference divisions and by being a founding member of the new AFL London Women's league. On April 25th 2015 the South East London Giants hosted North London Lions in the first official AFL London Women's Match, featuring a banner that read "one small step for the Giants, one giant leap for AFL London".

The Women's team along with the club grew strongly over the next 2 years with the men moving up to the Premiership division and the women having an incredibly strong season in 2017 going all the way to the Grand Final.

After struggling with the impacts of the global pandemic, namely the cancellation of the 2020 season, in 2022 the Giants celebrated their tenth anniversary. The club celebrated with anniversary training jerseys. In the 2022 season Joe Arthur of the Men's team was awarded the AFL London Men's Social Best and Fairest.

In 2023 the Giant's Women's team made the AFL London Conference Grand Final beating Wandsworth Demons and West London Wildcats in the path. They fell short to London Swans on the day. Arthur secured back to back AFL London Best and Fairest awards this time sharing the prize with fellow Giant, Geoff MacKay. During this season the Giants began live streaming their games on their YouTube channel so friends and family from abroad could watch the action from wherever they were in the world. They continue to live stream all their home games with live commentary provided by players.

In March 2024 Peckham Rye hosted the AFL Masters event where UK based masters took on a team visiting from Australia. Over 400 people gathered throughout the day to watch two great matches.

The Giants secured their first premiership flag in 2024 with the Men's Socials side beating the Wandsworth Demons in the Grand Final to take home the cup at Motspur Park. The final score was Demons (6.1) 37 Giants (8.8) 56, with goals kicked from Brett Boyle (2), Geoff McKay, Joe Arthur, Ben Hislop, Matthew Pert, Nathan Brown and Harry Brookes.

The club won their second premiership flag in 2026 with the Women's team beating the North London Lions in the Grand Final at Chiswick Rugby Club. The final score was Lions (1.0) 6 Giants (2.8) 20 with Ellie Hyner and Alex Stephens scoring the goals for the club.

== Club Ethos ==
The South East London Giants have a strong emphasis on club culture with their motto of BE.GIANT representing how they support each other both on and off the field.

The club marches in London Pride every year as part of AFL London.

== Life Members ==
Life Membership is an award to recognise significant contributions made by individuals to the Club. Life Membership is the highest honour that can be bestowed by the Giants.

2013	Lonnie Pitcher	Lachy Rose	
2014	Matthew Clydesdale	Jaya Thursfield	
2015	Guy 'Bud' McGrath	Mary Hogan	Michael Hogan
2016	David Field		
2017	Marianna Graham	Lynne Woodridge	
2018	Alex Roberts		
2019	Karli 'Ginge' Smith		
2021	Greg Ross		
2024	Alyssa Tuddenham	Susie Carr	Nathan Brown

== See also ==
London Giants Netball Club

AFL London

AFL Europe
