= Firkin =

Firkin may refer to:

- Firkin (unit), small cask used for liquids, butter, salt, and sometimes fish:
  - Firkin, a volume of beer; see English brewery cask units#Firkin
- Firkin Brewery, a chain of pubs in the United Kingdom
- Firkin Roos, an Australian rules football team in Britain; see Earls Court Kangaroos
- Firkin, NATO reporting name for the Sukhoi Su-47, a Russian experimental jet fighter
