= London Swans =

Australian rules football club in London, England

The London Swans are an Australian rules football club based in London, England.

== History ==
Sussex Swans were formed in the early 1990s, with the British Australian Rules Football League quite keen to expand with teams outside London. The Sydney Swans donated on the first set of footy jumpers that was to last three years. It was intended to replace the Sydney Opera House logo with a representation of the Brighton Pavilion when a new set of jumpers was needed.

The Swans' first game in the BARFL was on 21 April 1991 at King's Manor Upper School ground in Shoreham-by-Sea, West Sussex against the Bristol Bears. The Swans were defeated by a large margin. In the first year the Swans lost every game with the team largely being made up of British players and with only an average of four Australians. Their first victory finally came during the 1992 season.

In 1993 the Sussex Swans moved to Crawley Rugby Club, won the first game of the season against the Bristol Bears and then beat the East Midland Eagles in round two - the only time to date the Swans have led the BARFL ladder.

1998 saw the Swans reach the BARFL Premiership finals for the first time, losing to the Wimbledon Hawks in the semi-finals. 1999 saw the Swans reach the semi-final of the Pre Season Cup for the first time, though they were defeated by the more experienced Wandsworth Demons.

In 2001, ten members of the Swans' squad were selected for the British Bulldogs side for the Atlantic Alliance Cup held in London. And the Swans made it through to the semi-finals of the pre season cup narrowly missing out on a grand final spot after being defeated by North London. (future AFL player Michael Rix then on o/s travel played in these matches). The Sydney Swans at this time were again supportive and interested in the club. And donated a set of playing jumpers to the club. Sent directly after an AFL game in Adelaide. This gesture was warmly received. The Swans also gained media attention in the back pages of the Melbourne's 'Herald Sun' in 2001 after an audacious attempt to lure AFL bad boy Wayne Carey to play while he was in AFL limbo.

=== 2002 and 2003 seasons turning point ===
In 2002 the club playing numbers and on-field performance continued to improve and many new players could no longer be guaranteed a game. In what was a bold plan it was decided at the end of this season that in 2003 the Swans would enter a second team into the then BARFL. This team would not be based in Sussex. It would be London based. It would be known to start with as the City Swans and play in the conference league while Sussex remained in the premiership division. The idea did have its doubters and met with initial resistance from some quarters. One league official was quoted as saying "we will never allow it". This view instead of closing the idea of a new London based Swans team actually inspired then Club President Sam Dixon, Coach Alex Hill and Captain Dave Sheehan to push ahead with the plan regardless. As they shared a collective vision for the Swans having a team in London which would enhance on field performance and player growth strategies.

2003 The first London based pre-season training session was promoted to take place in Regents Park. Over 60 new and existing players attended, validating the belief the London Swans could start a London team and training base. A new sponsor the Shaftesbury Walkabout came on board donating new jumpers, club shirts, VIP entry and player half price drink cards.

On the field the new Swans London team debuted in the first match of the season. A a double header played against the two reigning premiers of premiership and conference divisions both from the North London Lions club. In what was a huge BARFL upset result at the time, both Swans teams recorded victories for the first time ever respectively against the BARFL powerhouse North London club. It was a highpoint for this era and the genesis of the London Swans as they are known today. One of the Swans players' wives, Aleisha Scanlon, was instrumental in entering the 'Swanettes' netball teams into a London netball league for the first time. The City Swans made it through to the BARFL finals in their first year. And Brian Clarke's Australian touring composite team 'The Convicts' chose to play an end of season non-league fixture against the Swans in what was a great match. The Swans continued in the BARFL Premiership competition and field a second team - the City Swans - in the BARFL London Conference. This Conference team finished fifth in the ladder in 2006, narrowly missing a place in the Finals.

In 2007 the Swans moved from their traditional Sussex home to a London base, with a presence remaining in Sussex through the new third team created to compete in a new regional league.

=== 2007 and 2008 seasons ===
Throughout 2007 and 2008 the Swans established themselves as one of the leading clubs in the London AFL league. They are now the only club truly based in Central London, with training and home games held at Regent's Park.

The 2008 season was key to the club, with the EU base expanding, and a memorable win against the Wandsworth Demons in the last game of the season, held on 26 July 2008. The Swans kicked four goals in the last five minutes of the game, defeating the Demons by one goal. However, after mixed fortunes on the pitch during the year, they ended the season fifth in the ladder.

=== 2010 ANZAC Cup victory ===
In 2010, the London Swans were victorious in the 16th Annual ANZAC Cup held at Osterley. The Swans went through the round-robin tournament undefeated, with victories over West London Wildcats and North London Lions in the preliminary stages, before defeating Putney Magpies in the semi-final. In the Grand Final, the Swans faced North London Lions and after a strong second half, ran away victors by 2 goals. Best on ground was awarded to new recruit Anthony Raso, who dominated across the forward line all day, taking several spectacular 'Warwick Capper-style' marks.

=== Future developments ===
The Swans are currently undergoing a period of extensive change, resulting in many areas of the club expanding. The club is being successful in recruiting many new EU players, and full-fledged Netball teams are now also part of the club's London operations.

The Swans are currently the only BARFL club in the country working towards their own youth academy.
