= Mark Zanotti =

Australian rules footballer

Personal information
- Full name: Mark Francesco Zanotti
- Born: 11 August 1964 (age 62)
- Original team: Subiaco (WAFL)
- Height: 185 cm (6 ft 1 in)
- Weight: 88 kg (194 lb)

Playing career^{1}
Years	Club	Games (Goals)
1983–1988	Subiaco	60 10)
1987–1988	West Coast	36 (6)
1989–1992	Brisbane Bears	64 (5)
1993–1995	Fitzroy	57 (8)
Total		217 (29)
- ^{1} Playing statistics correct to the end of 1995.

Mark Francesco Zanotti (born 11 August 1964) is a former Australian rules footballer who played with the West Coast Eagles, Brisbane Bears and Fitzroy Football Club in the Australian Football League (AFL).

Zanotti usually played at fullback and started his career with Scarborough before joining Subiaco in the West Australian Football League (WAFL). He played in their 1986 premiership and won the Simpson Medal for best on ground in the grand final. The following season he joined then VFL and was a member of West Coast's inaugural side. After two seasons he moved to Brisbane and had his best season in 1990 when he finished third in their best and fairest. He finished his career at Fitzroy from 1993 until 1995, adding 57 games. In addition to playing for three VFL/AFL clubs he also represented Western Australia five times in interstate football.

After finishing his career in Australia he moved to the UK where he was one of the founders of the London Gryphons who subsequently became the Putney Magpies.
