= Putney Magpies =

Putney Magpies Aussie Rules Football Club, London

Names
- Full name: Putney Magpies
- Nickname: Hot Pies

2015 season
- Home-and-away season: 5th
- Leading goalkicker: James Staples
- Best and fairest: Shane Saunders

Club details
- Founded: 2004
- Colours: Black and White
- Competition: AFL London Premiership
- President: Mark Pitura
- Coach: Nathan Buckley
- Captain(s): Andrew Lawson & Greg Chapman
- Premierships: -
- Ground: Richardson Evans Memorial Playing Fields

Other information

The Putney Magpies is an Australian rules football club based in west London. The club runs men's and women's teams, and includes many Australian expats.

The club fields teams in each of the three AFL London divisions — Premiership (1sts), Conference (2nds) and Social (3rds). The associate netball club is called the Putney Blackbirds.

== History ==
The London Gryphons were founded in 1999 by former West Coast Eagles, Brisbane Bears and Fitzroy Football Club player Mark Zanotti along with BARFL Admin Officer Donald Eastwood who originally played with the Earls Court Kangaroos, and have competed in the British Australian Rules Football League since that year. The club was originally made up of former rugby players and were predominantly British. After Zanotti's return to Australia after one year where the Gryphons made the finals, the Gryphons struggled both off-field and on-field, and eventually formed a partnership with the London Collingwood Supporters group, changing their name and colours to match those of the AFL's Collingwood Magpies.

The Putney Magpies were started in 2004 by Simon Thorp in his capacity as President of the London Collingwood Supporters Club, a phoenix rising from the ashes of the London Gryphons. Simon landed some good sponsorship, attracted some of the former Gryphons players (as well as some new blood), and with a bit of help from Eddie and the Collingwood Football Club, the Putney Magpies were born. Simon remained as President for the first two years.

The Putney Magpies Football Club made the 2004 Conference Grand Final in its first year as a club, a top four finish in 2005, developed five International players who represented their country in the 2005 British Bulldogs tour to Melbourne for the AFL International Cup, and boasted the 2005 Conference Best and Fairest winner and both the 2004 and 2005 Grand Final half time 'Dash for Cash' winners.

In seasons 2008 and 2010, the Putney Magpies competed in the London AFL Premiership Grand Final.

Committee Members
- President: Mark Pitura
- Vice President: Taryn Dawson & Brian O'Dea
- Treasurer: Brad Busch

Putney now fields three teams in the AFL London Competition with a side to suit all levels and abilities. The Premiership side must field 5 non-aussies and 4 British players on the field while the Conference side (known as the reserves) only has to field 2. The Social team is also an available facility for interested people.

The Premiership side is coached by former Richmond, Essendon and Collingwood player Mark Pitura who also played games for Sturt in the SANFL.

The Pies are now entering their 10th season in the AFL London competition and are now going from strength to strength in the number of participants involved in the club.

== Training and matches ==
The club trains at Hurlingham Park every Sunday at 1pm from the first weekend of Feb during the pre-season, then switches to Tuesdays and Thursday evenings from 6.30pm in South Park, Parsons Green after Easter once the daylight becomes longer.

Home games are played on Wimbledon Common at the Richardson Evans memorial playing fields in Putney Vale every Saturday during the summer months from early May until late July. Away games are played all through London. Finals are played in the month of August.

== Honour board ==
COMMITTEE

Year	President	Vice-President	Secretary	Treasurer	Captain
2004	Simon Thorp		Matt Sime	Matt Sime	
2005	Simon Thorp		Matt Sime	Viktor Zabori	
2006	Ben Connolly		Matt Sime	Matt Sime	
2007	Ben Connolly		Matt Sime	Matt Sime	Alex Thompson
2008	Mick Mullins	Blair Riseborough		Graham Tuffin	Alex Thompson
2009	Pete O'Neill	Brad McLeod		Charlie Craig	Brad McLeod
2010	Mark Pitura	Aaron Williams	Phil McLeod	Steven Tindale	Aaron Williams/Paul Sosic
2011	Mark Pitura	Paul Sosic	Jimmy Lloyd	Steven Tindale	Liam Flanagan/Paul Sosic
2012	Mark Pitura			Steven Tindale	Greg Chapman/Andrew Slevison
2013	Mark Pitura	Taryn Dawson	Rob Paterson	Brad Busch	Greg Chapman/Andrew Lawson

PREMIERSHIP

Year	Position	Coach	Best & Fairest	Leading Goalkicker	Best EU/Non Aussie
2004		Remon Gazal	Gareth Edwards/Remon Gazal	Steve Connolly	Phil Holby
2005		Ben Connolly	Tommy Langford	Joe Cordwell	Chris Dickson
2006		Andrew Tweedie	Pete O'Neill	Joe Cordwell	Chris Dickson
2007	4th	Andrew Tweedie	Alex Thompson	Rick Talbot	Andy Ruinoff
2008	2nd	Mark Pitura	Alex Thompson/Pete O'Neill	Justin Hunter	Andy Ruinoff
2009	3rd	Mark Pitura	Aaron Williams	Joe Pedler	Christian Maine
2010	2nd	Mark Pitura	Greg Hesse	Pete McGettigan	Paul Harris/Andy Ruinoff
2011	4th	Mark Pitura	Josh Cutten	Andrew Slevison (31)	John Scott
2012	3rd	Alex Gunn	Clayton Fitzgerald	Andrew Slevison (54)	James O'Connor
2013					

CONFERENCE

Year	Position	Coach	Best & Fairest	Leading Goalkicker
2004		Remon Gazal	Lauchlan MacKinnon	Nick Dallimore
2005		Jeremy Cogdon	Dave Van Horne	Nick Dallimore
2006		Remon Gazal	Scott Richmond	Nick Dallimore/Matt Sime
2007	4th	Mark Pitura	Blair Robertson	Steve Connolly
2008	3rd	Blair Riseborough	Chris Connolly	Nick Salter
2009	3rd	Mark Pitura	Matt Best	Mark Pitura/Ryan Batt
2010	5th	Mark Pitura	Brad Pozzi	Nick Maddock
2011	5th	Mark Pitura	Luke Howard	Luke Howard
2012	4th	Pat Mahon	Jarred Jones	Pat Mahon
2013				

Year	Great Britain Representatives
2004	N/A
2005	Phil Holby, Simon Jones, Chris Dickson, Jon Dickson, Chris Glen, Paul Harris
2006	Chris Dickson, Jon Dickson, Nick Stevens, Paul Manley, Chris Glen, Paul Harris
2007	Andy Ruinoff, Chris Dickson, Amerigo Holthouse, Paul Harris, Paul Manley
2008	Andy Ruinoff, Amerigo Holthouse, Paul Harris, Graham Tuffin, Christian Lloyd, Aiden Dillane
2009	Rob Harmeston, Christian Lloyd, Christian Maine, Paul Harris, Andy Ruinoff
2010	Rob Harmeston, Paul Harris, Andy Ruinoff, Adam Street, Martyn Hinchey
2011	Paul Harris (Capt), Tom Mercer, Mark Todd
2012	N/A
2013	Paul Harris, Mark Todd, Will Murrells, Eliott Rich, Rob Harmeston

== International matches ==
- 2008 The Brussels Saints, Brussels, Belgium
- 2009 The Flying Dutchmen, Amsterdam, Netherlands
- 2010 The Flying Dutchmen, Amsterdam, Netherlands
- 2011 The Flying Dutchmen, Amsterdam, Netherlands
- 2012 Port Malmo Maulers, Malmo, Sweden
- 2013 Berlin Crocodiles, Berlin, Germany

== Footy trips ==
- 2007 Riga, Latvia
- 2008 Newcastle, England
- 2009 Newcastle, England
- 2010 Nottingham, England
- 2011 Lagos, Portugal
- 2012 Magaluf, Spain
- 2013 Lagos, Portugal
- 2014 Magaluf, Spain
- 2015 Fulham, England
- 2016 Sunny Beach, Bulgaria
