= Bristol Dockers =

Australian rules football club in the UK

Bristol Dockers FC
- Nicknames: The Dockers, The Purple Haze
- Sport: Australian Rules football
- League: Welsh Australian Rules Football League
- Based in: Bristol
- Colours: Purple and white
- Website: www.facebook.com/groups/4531149445/

The Bristol Dockers (formerly the Bristol Bears) is an Australian rules football club based in Bristol, England. The club has both men's and ladies' teams competing in the 9-a-side format.

The club currently plays home games at Aretians RFC fortress and trains there and at The Downs, Bristol.

== History ==
The Bristol Bears were the first Australian Rules club in England's West Country, formed in 1991, in the British Australian Rules Football League. Their first match was against fellow newcomers the Sussex Swans at Shoreham-by-Sea, the Bears running out 119-point winners. The Bears often struggled against the London clubs, although occasional difficulties in travel for the Londoners (forfeiting the long road trip west) meant the Bears performed well on paper without actually taking the paddock.

The Bears changed their name for the 1997 season to the Dockers, continuing on in the BARFL premiership, then becoming part of the BARFL Regional series upon inception of this competition in 2003. They won the inaugural Regional premiership in this year, the first flag in their 13-year history.

With the creation of the Aussie Rules UK regional leagues in 2007, the Dockers elected to play in the BARFL's London Social League (now the Social Division of the AFL London).

In 2010 the Dockers again made it to the Semi Finals in AFL London Social league, coming undone in the last half of the game and conceding defeat.

In 2011, the Dockers moved to the 9-a-side format in the Welsh Australian Rules Football League (WARFL) which meant a change in home ground from the Aretians Rugby Football Club ground.

In 2018 the Bristol Dockers announced the formation of a ladies' team, a historic moment for the club.

At the conclusion of the 2021 WARFL season, long-time captain-coach Dan "Hoops" Hooper returned to Australia, ending an era dominated by long bombs and torps to goal.

== Glory years: 2014–2017 ==
The Bristol Dockers experienced an unprecedented level of success during the 2010s. During the 2014 season the Dockers went unbeaten, winning 11 consecutive games, including a home and away double against arch rivals Cardiff Panthers. The 2014 final is one of the greatest moments in dockers history. The final was played at Aretians RFC in Bristol and won by a single score by the dockers.

In 2017 Bristol Dockers were yet again crowned WARFL champions. With the Dockers finishing second in the league a tough away final in Cardiff was played out. The final started badly for the Dockers who were 3 goals down after the first half. In true Dockers style, Bristol turned it around in the 3rd, blowing away the strong Panthers team. The Dockers stood firm in the final quarter to hold on and win comfortably.

== 2018–2019 ==
The 2018 season proved to be yet another successful season for the Dockers. Following the title in 2017 the Dockers qualified for the AFL Europe - European Champions League.

They had a tough draw, including tournament favorites and reigning champions, West London Wildcats and the "Young but Powerful" Zagreb Dockers, in the game billed the "Docker Derby". Despite the tough draw, and unconventional tournament preparation, the Dockers achieved a creditable 13th place in the tournament, with a notable victory over Styrian Dogs in the knockout stages.

The tournament was also notable for being the Dockers' first internationally televised match, playing against the French ALFA Lions.

Back on home soil the Dockers set out to defend their WARFL title. 2018 was a big year for the WARFL with the introduction of cross regional tournaments with the UK South Eastern Australian Football League (SEAFL) and the WARFL. These included games against Portsmouth Pirates, Southampton Titans, the Sussex Swans and the Bath & Wiltshire Redbacks (in the combined SEWARFL) with the Dockers coming out victorious in the inaugural tournament.

Bristol Dockers performed admirably over the course of the season defending their title. Significant victories were recorded over South Cardiff Panthers in a season defining, hard fought, 13 point victory playing with a scratch 9 and the spectacular round 5 186–22 victory over Chippenham Redbacks.

The July Grand Final against the South Cardiff Panthers was played in Bristol at the Dings Crusaders RFC. Bristol were victorious 14 14 98 def Cardiff Panthers 5 17 47, in their most comprehensive victory ever over their fierce rivals.

In 2019 the club decided to form a women's team. On 2 March, as part of a round robin tournament involving Sussex Swans, London Swans and Cardiff Panthers, the Bristol Dockers Ladies competed in their first ever competitive games.

As 2018 WARFL champions the Dockers qualified for the 2019 AFL Europe - European Champions League. Following an intense preseason campaign a much changed Bristol Dockers Squad finished a creditable 12th, with the Dockers team manager stating "It's really big for us as a chance to push ourselves against stronger teams before our season – and also fantastic to be part of keeping the focus on club sides outside of London in the UK."

Bristol Dockers kicked off their WARFL campaign with a comprehensive victory over the Chippenham Redbacks 101 to 40 in horrendous conditions.

== Individual awards ==
Year	Best & Fairest	Players Player	Most Improved
2018	Charlie Callendar	Fraser Rigby	
2017			
