= Reading Kangaroos =

Australian rules football club in England

The Reading Kangaroos is an Australian rules football club which plays in the English town of Reading. Formed by Australians living in the area, the club quickly grew with strong local interest, now attracting players from all over Berkshire. The club is sponsored by The Reading Walkabout.

== History ==
The Reading Roos were formed for the 2003 British Australian Rules Football League season, playing in the newly formed BARFL Regional division. They played their first match against a selection from Oxford University at King's Meadow in Reading, and in the regular season, went on to make the grand final – although they were defeated by the Bristol Dockers.

The 2004 season saw the Roos win the grand final, thumping Bristol 28.20.188 to 1.6.12, with South Australian full forward Phil Barnard kicking a record 10.0 goals. The club also travelled to Aalborg in Denmark and won the Sheep Stations Cup against the North Copenhagen Barracudas.

In 2005, the Roos competed in both the BARFL Premiership and the BARFL Regional competitions, though they failed to make the grand final in either league. In the BARFL Premiership despite committed performances, the guys could not match the greater experience of the London sides and finished 5th, though they did record a memorable victory against a dominant Wandsworth Demons team, the first side outside of the top 3 ever to do so. The club did repeat their victory in the Sheep Stations Cup, this time held in Copenhagen, Denmark, defeating the Farum Young Guns.

In 2006, the club competed in the BARFL Regional division, again winning a grand final against the Nottingham Scorpions. The club also successfully defended the Sheep Stations Cup, held in Landskrona, Sweden, defeating the South Dublin Swans in an epic final.

In 2007-8, the club played in the London Conference. With a struggle to match both the experience of the opposition and the available numbers, the club were unable to contest finals and only managed infrequent wins.

In 2009, the club decided to drop down to the London social league, which includes Nottingham Scorpions and Manchester Mosquitos. Reading made it to the semi-finals for the first time in a London League, but unfortunately were defeated by old rivals Nottingham. They also hosted the Brit cup this year which is the EU only tournament, getting knocked out of the group stages, after two wins against Scotland and ARUK Central.

In 2010 through 2017, the club continued in the London 3rds (or social) league and with the recruitment of some promising younger locals, began to develop into more of a competitive team, winning a majority of matches and contesting with their more experienced London peers. The team reached finals every year except 2017, winning the Grand Final in 2012 (vs Wimbledon Hawks) and 13 (vs Ealing Emus).

These victories and the continuing social development were a clear indicator of the impact coach Travis White had made to the way the club played, trained and socialised, with growing numbers at club events and 2 flags, playing against teams with many more Australian players.

== International tour matches ==
In early 2005, the Roos toured to Atlanta in the United States, defeating the home town Atlanta Kookaburras. In 2006 they competed in Perpignan against a French national selection, winning a tight match.

In 2004, 5 and 6, the club took a squad to Denmark and Sweden to compete in the annual, 9-a-side Sheep Station Cup, winning and retaining the trophy through these 3 years.

== Player development ==
The Roos includes several Australians with experience in the Australian leagues. These experienced players contribute to the development of local British talent, and have gone on to represent the Great Britain Bulldogs national Australian rules football team.

2010 saw Adam Bennett and Gareth Blackstaffe-Turner selected for the first Team Europe, for their performances at the 2010 European Championships, held in Denmark and Sweden. Prior to the 2017 International Cup, Adam Bennett was the most capped Bulldog player and Andrew Whiteaker the top goal-scorer for the representative team.

The Roos have attracted players from a wide variety of backgrounds, including soccer, rugby (union and league), basketball, athletics, martial arts, Gaelic Football and, of course, native Aussie Rules.
