= O. R. Tambo Recreation Ground =

Park in London

Coordinates: 51.60219°N 0.13349°W

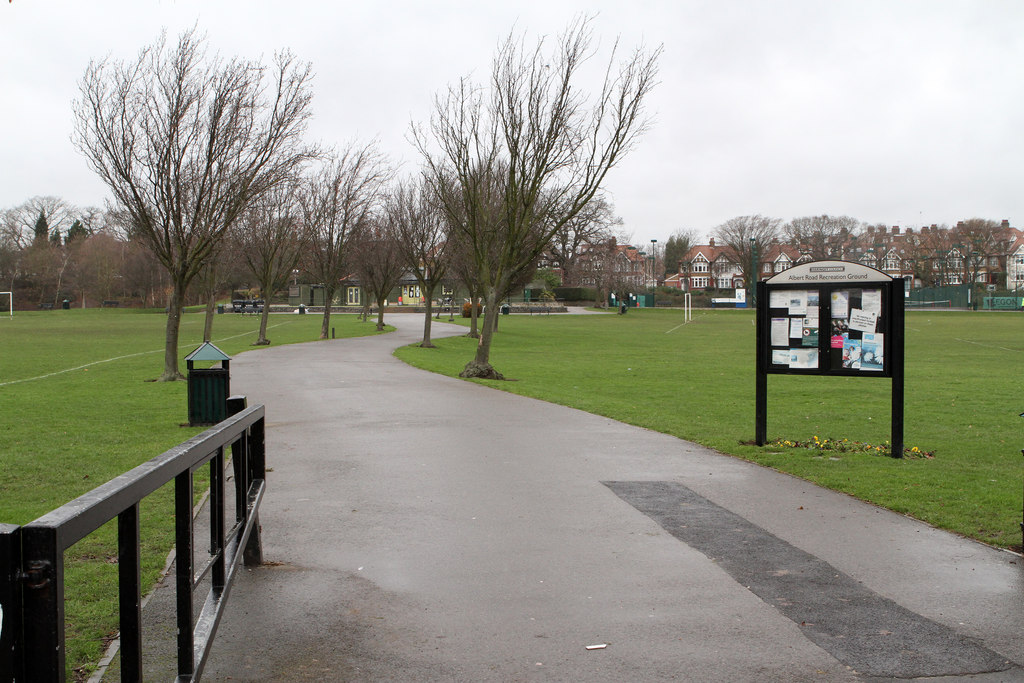
Main entrance to the park

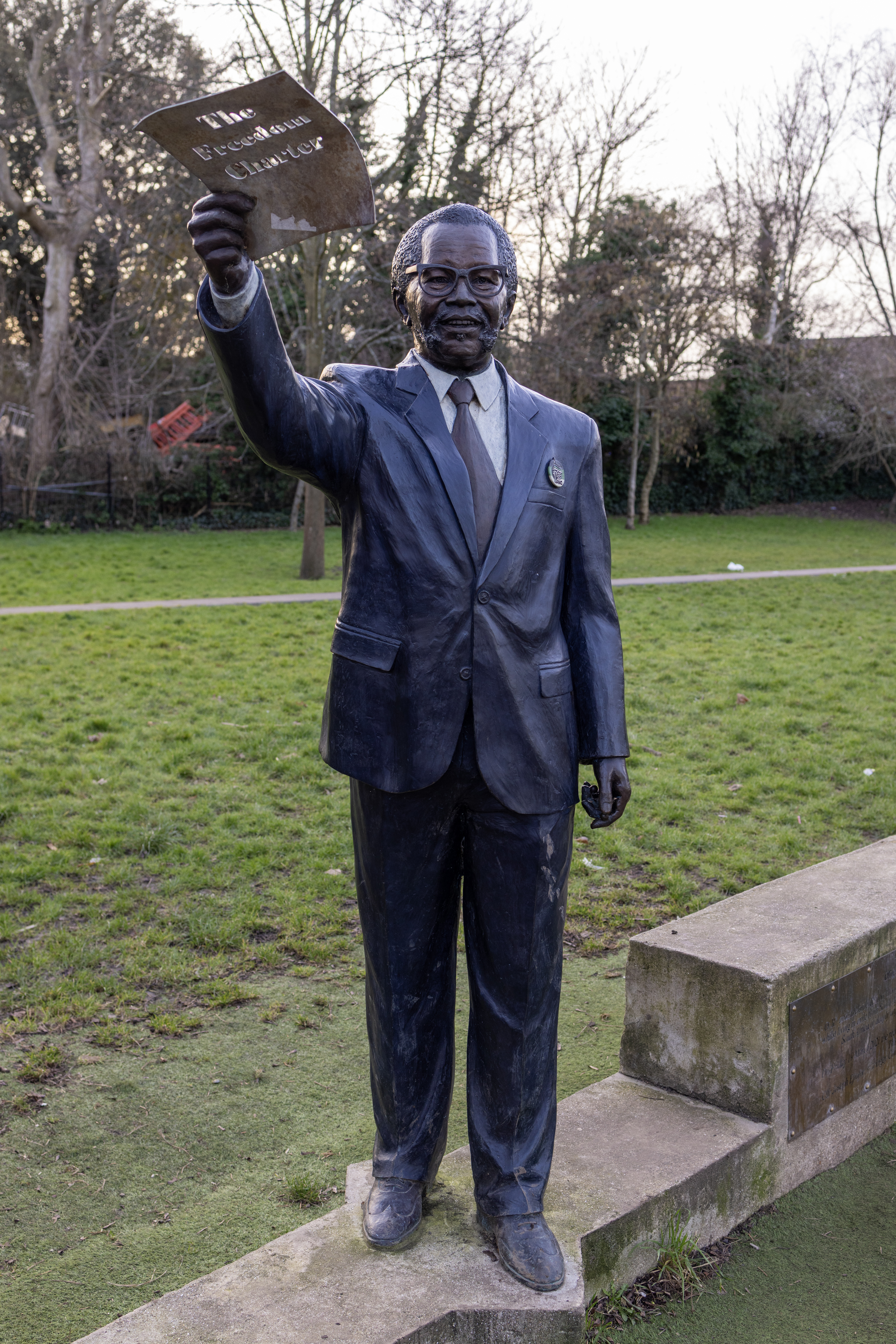
Statue of Oliver Tambo

O. R. Tambo Recreation Ground, previously known as Albert Road Recreation Ground, is a public park in the London Borough of Haringey. The park is 6.39 hectares (15.8 acres) in size and has many facilities for sports such as tennis, cricket and football. The site is protected by Fields in Trust through a legal "Deed of Dedication" safeguarding the future of the space as public recreation land for future generations to enjoy.

In February 2021, Haringey council renamed the park in honour of the South African anti-Apartheid activist Oliver Tambo. A memorial to Tambo was first installed in 2009, which included a bust and commemorative garden. This was further extended in 2019 with the installation of a more lifelike statue, and the renaming in 2021.

== Recognition ==
The park was accredited with a Green Flag Award in 2006, received several awards from Fields in Trust in 2012 and in 2013 won a gold prize in the London in Bloom awards.
