= Glasgow Sharks =

Names
- Full name: Glasgow Sharks; Australian Rules Football Club
- Motto: "One Goal, One Passion, One Club"

Club details
- Founded: 2003
- Colours: Blue White
- Competition: SARFL / SARFL W
- President: (Scotland) John McIntyre
- Coach: (Australia) Adam Jack
- Captain: (Australia) James Hancock (England) Ellie Hancock
- Ground: GHA Rugby Club

Other information
- Official website: GlasgowSharks.co.uk

The Glasgow Sharks is an Australian rules football club in Glasgow, Scotland.

== History ==
The Sharks were re-formed in late 2003 by Australian Andrew Butler from what had been the Caledonia Sharks, who had existed in Glasgow for a time during the 1990s existed sporadically.

The recreation of the Sharks was down to hard work by Butler to acquire Sponsorship from local Aussie theme bar the Walkabout and recruitment drive on Australia Day providing details of training, contacts. Etc. also hanging Posters in and around Glasgow (Backpacker Hostels, Internet Café's, libraries, Sports Club/Gyms and Shops) inviting anyone to come along and join in. this generated enough interest for Scotland to have their very own Aussie Rules League with a Team back in Glasgow.

The club wore blue jumpers with a white shark logo on the front (based on the WAFL Club East Fremantle Shark's Guernsey). The club was captained by Andrew Butler.

== Honours ==
Haggis Cup 2011 Haggis Cup 2014 Haggis Cup 2022 (Women's)

SARFL 2016 Mens Premiership

Tyne Tees Cup 2016 Winners

Inaugural SARFLW 2019 Women's Premiership

Movember Cup 2022 (Women's)

SARFLW 2023 Women's Premiership
