= Mark Pitura =

Australian rules footballer

Personal information
- Full name: Mark Pitura
- Born: 26 June 1974 (age 52)
- Original teams: Turvey Park, (Riverina FL)
- Draft: No. 8, 1996 Pre-season Draft

Playing career^{1}
Years	Club	Games (Goals)
1993	Richmond	2 (0)
- ^{1} Playing statistics correct to the end of 1996.

Mark Pitura (born 26 June 1974) is a former Australian rules footballer who played for Richmond in the Australian Football League (AFL) in 1993. He was recruited by Richmond from the Turvey Park Football Club in the Riverina Football League. He is the son of former South Melbourne and Richmond player, John Pitura.

After playing two games for Richmond in 1993, he spent 1995 playing for the Essendon reserves. In the 1996 Pre-season Draft, Collingwood drafted Pitura with the 9th selection but he did not play a league game for Collingwood and was delisted mid-way through the 1996 season.. From there he was picked up by the Sturt Football Club, debuting in Round 11 of the 1996 SANFL season before enjoying a successful stint.
