= Earls Court Kangaroos =

The Earls Court Kangaroos were an Australian rules football team based in London, England.

== History ==
The Earls Court Kangaroos were formed as a foundation club of the British Australian Rules Football League in 1990. Captained by ex St.Kilda player Chris Stone They changed their name to the Esher Kangaroos for the 1992 season, then to the Firkin Roos for the 1996–97 seasons, then folded after the 1997 season.

They appeared in the inaugural Grand Final in 1990 and were defeated by the Wandsworth Demons. They returned to the next Grand Final in 1991 and defeated the Wandsworth Demons by the biggest winning margin in the history of BARFL Grand Finals.

This was probably the highlight of the Roos existence, although former players attempted to get the club back on a sound footing, managed mainly under the guidance of Craig 'Howie' Howard. After the semi-final defeat in 1997, Howard decided he could not carry on with the clubs and decided to leave for Canada, where he helped coach an AFL club there.

== See also ==
- List of sports clubs inspired by others
