= Clapham Demons =

Australian rules football team

Clapham Demons Football Club

Names
- Nickname(s): Demons, Dees
- Motto: Punus Addo Magis

2014 season
- After finals: Runners Up
- Best and fairest: Adam Jeffery Mitch Thompson

Club details
- Founded: 2001
- Competition: AFL London
- Coach: Hamish Wilson
- Premierships: 2 (2009, 2016)
- Ground(s): Clapham Common (capacity: Thousands)

Management
- President: James Perret
- Vice Presidents: Mike Gates & Kevin O'Brien
- Secretary: Dominic Burnham
- Treasurer: Sam Percy

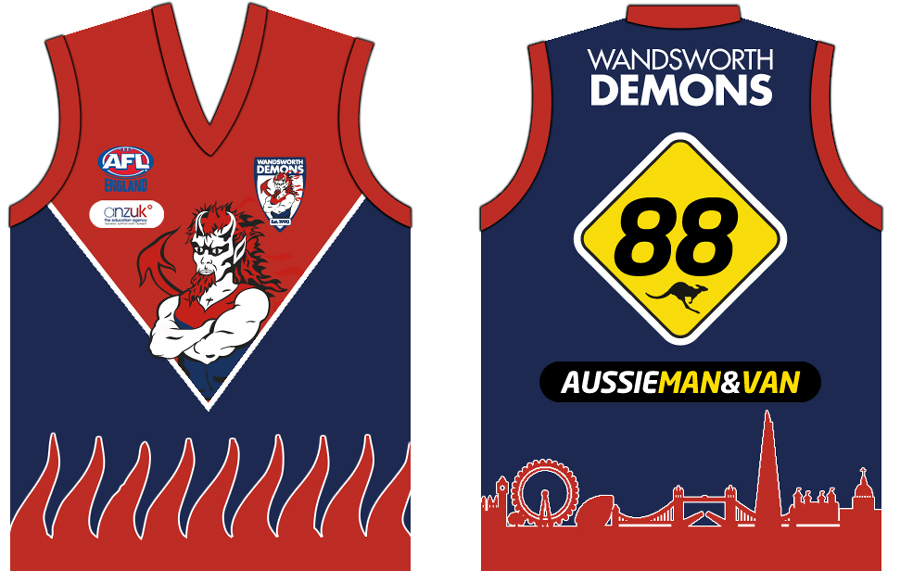
Clapham Demons jumper

The Clapham Demons are an Australian rules football team who are a founding member and play in the London Conference of the British Australian Rules Football League. They are the reserves grade side of the club The Wandsworth Demons based at Clapham Common in south London.

The team was formed in 1999 due to playing numbers at the club warranting the extra capacity for players. They were entered into the BARFL Premiership and played matches against the senior sides of all the clubs, including their own. At the time the league allowed for a maximum of 11 Australian players. The rest of the side of 18, as well as the bench, had to be filled with European players. The team struggled for numbers on the European player front and rarely won matches, though never forfeited.

Regardless of the difficulties in recruiting sufficient English and European players for both the club's sides, the team played two full seasons until the London Conference was created in 2001. This competition allowed for almost all positions to be played by Australians and was intended to allow clubs to field more Australian players without reducing the integrity of the senior competition.

The team was initially joined by a third side from the club, the Stockwell Demons, though a lack of numbers and enthusiasm for the team meant that the club withdrew that team at the midway point of the season.

After being defeated in the 2003, 2005, 2006, 2007 and 2008 Grand Finals, the Clapham Demons finally won their first Conference Premiership title in 2009. The Clapham Demons won their second Premiership in 2016, in a three-point-thriller.

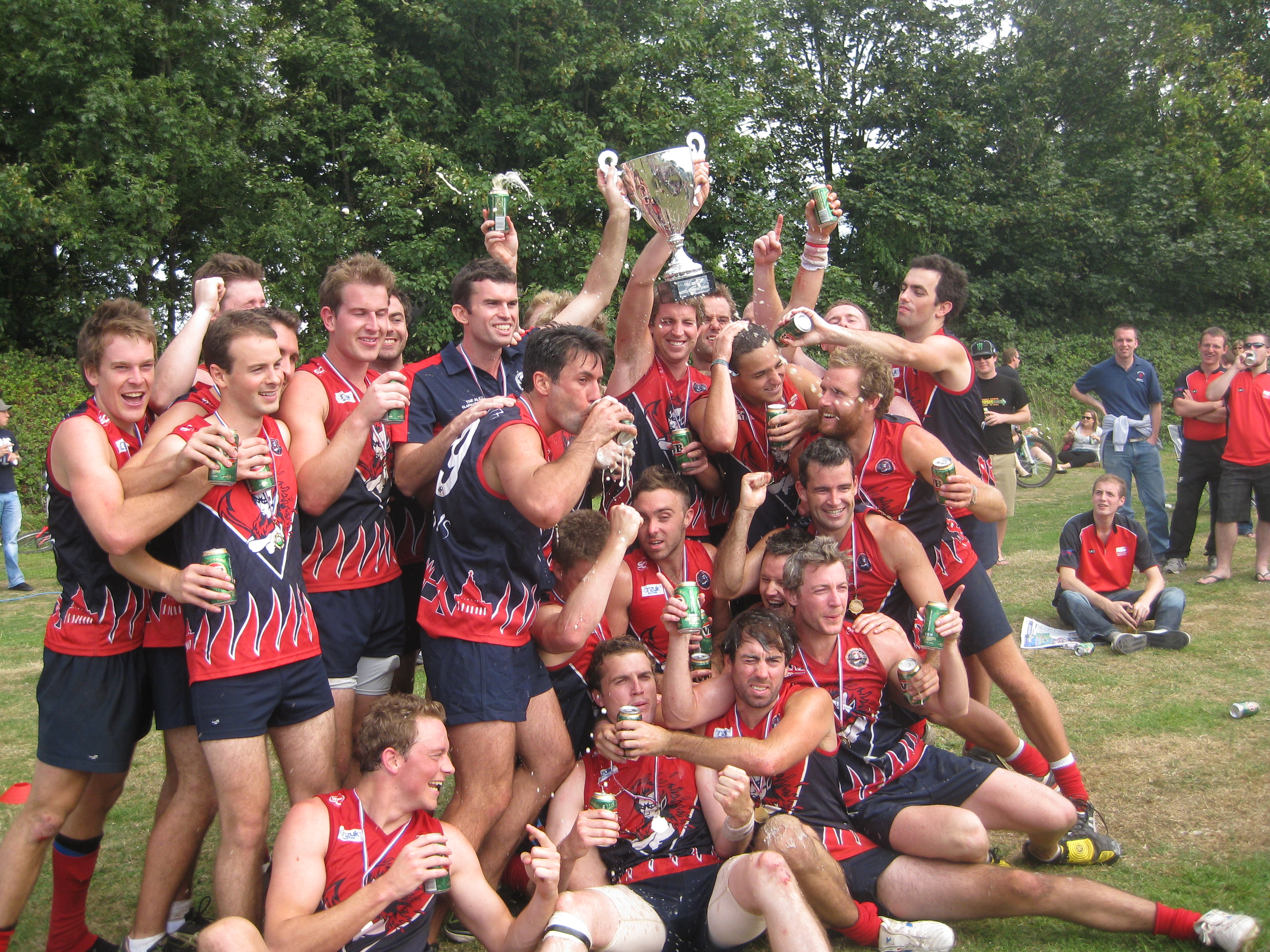
Clapham Demons

== Honour Board ==
Year	Position	Coach	Best & Fairest
2001	3rd	J.Cumming	J.Toohey
2002	3rd	J.Cumming	
2003	2nd	G.McQueen	
2004	3rd	J.Holloway	
2005	2nd	j.Holloway	D.Lumley
2006	2nd	G.Hoskins	D.Lumley
2007	2nd	D.Lumley/J.Coombe	R.Ravani
2008	2nd	J.Coombe/M/Meehan	L.Fehring
2009	1st	J.Coombe	T.Edmunds/J.Stormont
2010	2nd	R.Colling	S.Bates
2011	2nd	R.Curry	B.Clohesy
2012	3rd	R.Colling	S.Freeling
2013	3rd	M.Ashton	M.Ashton
2014	2nd	J.Diano	A.Jeffery/M.Thompson
2015		H.Wilson	
