= Wandsworth Demons =

Wandsworth Demons Football Club

Names
- Nickname(s): Demons, Dees
- Motto: Pugnus Addo Magis

2023 season
- After finals: (1st) Minor Premiers

Club details
- Founded: 1990
- Competition: AFL London
- President: Jade Ellams
- Premierships: 26 Men's Premiership: 10 (1990, 1992, 1995, 1997, 1999, 2003, 2010, 2017, 2018, 2023, 2024, 2025, 2026); Women's Premiership: 3 (2015, 2017, 2018, 2021, 2026); Men's Conference: 3 (2009, 2016, 2023); Women's Conference: 1 (2018); Men's Social: 9 (2007, 2009, 2011, 2015, 2016, 2017, 2018, 2019, 2023)
- Ground: Clapham Common

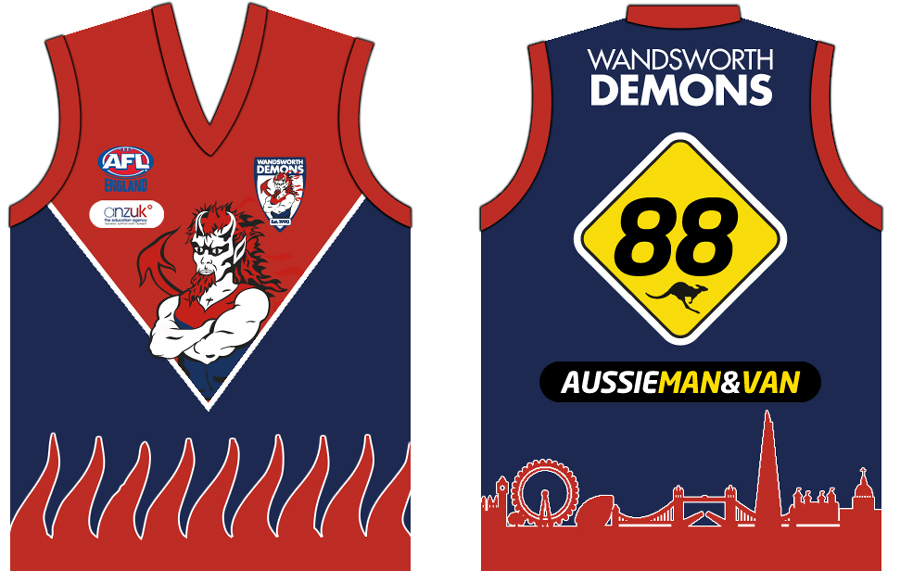
Wandsworth Demons jumper

The Wandsworth Demons are an Australian Rules Football club who play in the AFL London competition (formerly the British Australian Rules Football League). They are a founding member of the league and have been based at Clapham Common in south London since 1990.

They are one of two clubs that field sides in each of the 5 divisions; Men's Premiership, Conference and Social, and Women's Premiership and Conference. Wandsworth are one of the most successful sides in the Premiership with nine flags whilst the reserves grade side, the Clapham Demons, started playing in the Premiership in 1999 and were a founding member of the Conference in 2001. The South London Demons began in the Social Division in 2007, winning the inaugural flag. In 2014 the Demons were the first club to announce a ladies team for 2015 and in 2017 were among first clubs to introduce a second women's team for the newly created Women's Conference division.

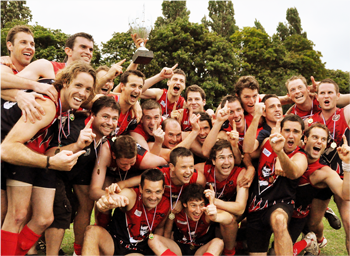
Wandsworth Demons grand final winners

== History ==
London, January 1990. Ex Nth Melb U19s/Reserves player (late '70s), Steve Poulsen was pronounced the first coach/manager of the Wandsworth FC by fellow BARFL committee man, a co founder of BARFL John Jelley (journalist). Fellow Tasmanian Craig Stephens (a solicitor), responded to an invite from Poulsen (BARFL/London Hawks) to attend the Lansdowne Club in Mayfair. Concentrating on the London Hawks, LH co founder Poulsen decided to hand Stephens an extensive players list and the job of club manager & the club was born. Stephens then held the first training session with Sean Angle on 14 Feb '90. The club won the first inaugural Grand Final, beating Earl's Court by just two points.

As the league was formed on the basis of promoting Australian Football overseas, not just as a recreational outlet for itinerant travellers, BARFL rules stipulated that 50% of the team had to be British. The club now fields the highest number of players picked from the London league to represent their country in the Great Britain Bulldogs.

With the number of Australians looking to play in London increasing, in 1998 Martin Tunley and Sam Percy devised the idea of starting a second team, the Clapham Demons. The West London Wildcats followed suit in 2000, and the year after that the rules for the London Conference division were forged. North London, Wimbledon and the Gryphons subsequently entered second sides as well. In 2001 the Demons and Wildcats fielded three teams for the season.

Club Evolution

In 2003 the club grew into a multi-sports outfit. The Demonettes began playing netball, and a basketball team started as well. The netball club has grown into a fully sufficient outfit with its own committee.

In 2007, Sam Percy as AFL London President encouraged clubs to each try to field a third side, and the London Social grade began, with the South London Demons winning the first flag. This grade started with thirds sides from the big clubs in London, the seconds of Wimbledon, and teams from further afield such as Bristol, Reading, and Nottingham. It has since been joined by South East London Giants.

In 2014 the Demons announced a women's team, with Wimbledon Hawks, South East London Giants and North London Lions following suit. In 2015 the women's team won the inaugural women's league after finishing the season top of the ladder.

In 2015 The Wandsworth Demons added a fourth team to their playing line-up, joining the inaugural AFL London women's league. The Wandsworth Demons women were minor premiers and premiers in their first season. And in 2017 The Wandsworth Demons were the first club in London to add a second women's team and help form the Women's Conference division, making Wandsworth Demons the only five team club in AFL London. In 2017 both women's teams played in the grand final with the Premiership women winning the 2017 season.

Recent History / Success

In 2023, the Demons won all three men's competitions for the first time, receiving flags in the Premiership, Conference and Social competitions.

The senior men's team has never missed finals. The senior men have played in 24 Grand Finals, winning ten of them. They won the premierships in 1990, 1992, 1995, 1997, 1999, 2003, 2010, 2017, 2018 and 2023.

The women's premiership side have won the Women's League three times, in 2015, 2017 and 2018.

Club Jumper and Song

For the majority of the 1990s Wandsworth wore the jumpers of the Melbourne Demons club from the AFL and these were replaced with the club's own design in the early 2000s, a jumper based on a pre-season cup jumper of the WAFL side the Perth Demons.

Their club song is sung to the tune of Battle Hymn of the Republic.

== Honour Board ==
Club Executive

Year	President	Vice President	Treasurer	Secretary
1990	C.Stephens	A.Palmer	R.Dilger	R.Officer
1991	A.Palmer	B.Neubauer	L.Pybus	J.Elliot
1992	X.Smith	B.Neubauer		
1993	B.Neubauer	A.Lance/R.Dilger	S.Walch	
1994	S.Morgan	C.Millar	S.Walch	F.Beattie/C.Shadbolt
1995	K.Schubert			C.Shadbolt
1996	K.Schubert	T.Cheshire	L.Kay	
1997	T.Cheshire	C.Watson	L.Kay	
1998	C.Watson	M.Maynard	M.Tunley	L.Kay
1999	A.Tunley	L.Kay		L.Kay
2000	M.Tunley	S.Percy	M.Adams	C.Black
2001	S.Percy	S.Hams	I.Mobbs	C.Black
2002	S.Hams	J.Cumming	I.Mobbs	C.Black
2003	J.Cumming	I.Mobbs	A.Tome	B.Edwards
2004	I.Mobbs	B.Edwards	B.Hugo	R.Burgess
2005	I.Mobbs	B.Edwards	B.Hugo	H.McGowan
2006	S.Percy	M.Taylor	B.Hugo	T.Taseff
2007	M.Taylor	J.Holloway	D.Lumley	B.Lee
2008	M.Wallace	B.Nash	S.Percy	G.Gilgallon
2009	M.Wallace	B.Nash	S.Percy	G.Gilgallon
2010	B.Nash	T.Donovan	S.Percy	M.McPartland
2011	M.McPartland	E.Ellis	S.Percy	T.Donovan
2012	M.McPartland	A.Crook	S.Percy	N.Collins
2013	M.McPartland	R.Colling	S.Percy	A.DeIacovo
2014	A.DeIacovo	B.Nash	M.McPartland	J.Pearson
2015	J.Perrett	M.Gates/K.O'Brien	S.Percy	D.Burnham
2016	J.Perrett	D.Burnham	S.Percy	M.Casalbuono
2017	J.Perrett	X.Holland/B.Valenzisi	S.Percy	M.Casalbuono
2018	X. Holland	B.Valenzisi/S.Martin	S.Percy	C. Jones
2019	X.Holland	C.Geoghegen/P.Lodge	B.Schreiner	L.Ewington
2020	X.Holland	P.Lodge/D.Jordan	B.Schreiner	L.Ewington
2021	X.Holland	D.Radis/P.Lodge	A.Lonsdale	L.Ewington
2022	D.Radis	J.Manley/L.Ewington	A.Lonsdale	V.Jaffer
2023	D.Radis	R.Leumann/C.Daniel	A.Lonsdale	A.Leonard
2024	D.Radis	N.de Gorter/C.Daniel	A.Lonsdale/J.Kirkbride	E.Palmer

Men's Premiership

Year	Position	Coach	Captain	Best and Fairest		
1990	1st	S.Angle				
1991	2nd	S.Morgan		D.Hoyle		
1992	1st	S.Morgan				
1993	3rd	K.Schubert				
1994	3rd	P.Currie				
1995	1st	P.Nolan				
1996	3rd	P.McCulloch				
1997	1st	M.Woods				
1998	2nd	M.Adams				
1999	1st	M.Tunley				
2000	2nd	J.Cumming				
2001	4th	R.Leary				
2002	3rd	D.Posterino				
2003	1st	B.Lewis				
2004	3rd	B.Lewis				
2005	3rd	B.Speers				
2006	3rd	J.Holloway				
2007	2nd	G.Hoskins				
2008	3rd	G.Hoskins				
2009	2nd	G.Gilgallon				
2010	1st	M.Thomas				
2011	2nd	R.Colling				
2012	2nd	J.Browne				
2013	4th	C.Wilson/J.Perrett				
2014	2nd	C.Wilson				
2015		C.Wilson		T.Georgiou		
2016	2nd	F.Caldow	G Rouse	C.Perry		
2017	1st	A.Walsh/F.Caldow	G.Rouse	S.Drake		
2018	1st	F.Caldow/G.Rouse	A.Jeffrey		J.Pollard	
2019	2nd	F.Caldow/S.Milne	A Jeffrey			B.Irving
2020	N/A	N/A	N/A	N/A		
2021	3rd	M.Corso	A.Coe	A.Coe		
2022		M.Corso	J.Noske	J.Rolfe		
2023	1st	C.Curtis	J.Noske/J.Rolfe	B.Irving		
2024		C.Curtis	B.Irving			

Men's Conference

Year	Position	Coach	Captain	Best and Fairest
2001	3rd	J.Cumming		J.Toohey
2002	3rd	J.Cumming		
2003	2nd	G.McQueen		
2004	3rd	J.Holloway		
2005	2nd	J.Holloway		D.Lumley
2006	2nd	G.Hoskins		D.Lumley
2007	2nd	D.Lumley/J.Coombe		R.Ravani
2008	2nd	J.Coombe/M/Meehan		L.Fehring
2009	1st	J.Coombe		T.Edmunds/J.Stormont
2010	2nd	R.Colling		S.Bates
2011	2nd	R.Curry		B.Clohesy
2012	3rd	R.Colling		S.Freeling
2013	3rd	M.Ashton		M.Ashton
2014	2nd	J.Diano		A.Jeffery/M.Thompson
2015		H.Wilson		
2016		A.Walsh/M.Pitman	M.Skelly	
2017		A.White	M.Skelly	
2018		A.White	H.Pearce	R.Chester
2019		A.White	H.Pearce	H.Ennis
2020	N/A	N/A	N/A	N/A
2021		J.Medwin	D.Gray	
2022	N/A	R.McBride	D.Gray	T.Eastick
2023	1st	N.de Gorter	C.Armstrong	T.Maslen/I.Kirby
2024		C.Armstrong/J.Bach	I.Smith	

Men's Social's

Year	Position	Coach	Captain	Best and Fairest
2015	1st	C.Hoare	T.Webster	M.Brescacin
2016	1st	T.Donovan	T.Webster	M.Brescacin
2017	1st	T.Donovan	T.Unitt	M.Brescacin
2018	1st	R.Wright	T.Unitt	M.Brescacin
2019	1st	E.Kenny	T.Unitt	M.Brescacin
2020	N/A	N/A	N/A	N/A
2021	2nd	X.Holland/D.Radis	H.Drage	T.Unitt
2022	2nd	X.Holland	H.Pearce	H.Pearce
2023	1st	X.Holland	H.Pearce	C.Rae
2024		X.Holland	H.Pearce/D.Radis	

Women's Premiership

Year	Position	Coach	Captain	Best and Fairest
2015	1st	H.Wilson	J.Edwards	T.Baxter
2016				
2017	1st			
2018	1st	M.Skelly	H.Canton/B.Valensizi	C.Jefress
2019		E.Hooper	P.Lodge/A.Geoghegan	J.Barrett
2020	N/A	N/A		N/A
2021	1st	D.Jordan	N.Clarke	A.Long
2022		D.Jordan	N.Clarke	J.Calam
2023	2nd	R.Freer	N.Clarke	J.Frost
2024		J.Ellams	T.Steen/J.Frost	

Women's Conference

Year	Position	Coach	Captain	Best and Fairest
2015				
2016				
2017				
2018		J.Exelby		C.Flynn
2019				L.Ewington
2020	N/A	N/A	N/A	N/A
2021		E.Hooper	A.Skimming	S.Boone
2022		M.Sexton/E.Hooper	B.Lane	S.Boone
2023		J.Ellams	M.Corcoran	R.Boone/A.Sharp
2024		E.Hooper	M.Corcoran	

== Notable players ==
Year	Best & Fairest	EU/ROW B&F	EU/ROW Best Rookie	Best Clubman	Life Member
1990	H.Dunstall	J.Hancock	J.Padraig/P.Padraig		
1991	D.Hoyle	R.Bredbury	R.Bredbury		
1992	R.Hart/K.Shubert	D.Coyle			
1993	J.Roberts	A.Lance			
1994	C.Millar	D.Connolly			S.Morgan/A.Palmer
1995	G.Tanner		D. Baker		M.Whiles
1996	P.McKibbon				C.Dobson/K.Schubert
1997	M.Adams	M.Maynard	J.Sullivan	C.Watson	T.Lineen
1998	W.Granger	M.Maynard	A.Bradbury	C.Watson	M.McCormack/M.Tunley/C.Watson
1999	N.Bolton	S.Buckley		S.Percy	S.Percy
2000	D.Munro				
2001	R.Thomson				
2002	R.Harrop				C.Black/S.Hams
2003	A.Bomford			J.Taylor	J.Cumming
2004	J.O'Hart	C.Ward	L.Powell		I.Mobbs
2005	P.Sheehan	C.Lynch	P.Kasti	J.Taylor	J.Taylor
2006	J.O'Hart	C.Walsh/J.Quick	G.Cox		B.Hugo/M.Maynard/J.Sullivan
2007	M.Henningsen	S.Carter	K.McHugo		H.Simpson/J.Holloway
2008	A.Jansen	J.Sharpe	J.Lockwood	M.Holliday/R.Frieberg	M.Taylor
2009	L.Ivens	C.O'Hagan/J.Stewart	C.O'Hagan/J.Stewart	A.Bernadi	
2010	M.Brescacin	J.Stewart	P.O'Donoghue	M.Holliday	B.Nash
2011	B.Jansen	B.Hayes/E.O'Murchu		B.Owen	
2012	R.McNay	J.O'Connell		A.DeIacovo	R.Colling/M.McPartland
2013	N.Martin	C.Horn	C.Horn	A.DeIacovo	
2014	T.Georgiou (and league)	C.Horn	A.Robert	J.Pearson	A.DeIacovo
2015	J.Walker	A.Watson	A.Watson	K.Grabowski	M.Holliday/J.Coombe
2016					J.Perrett, K. Grabowski
2017	S.Drake T.Hankinson	A.Watson O.Mulcahy		M.Skelly	C.Wilson
2018	Jordan Pollard				M.Brescacin
2019	Brayden Irving				X.Holland, A.Smith
2020	n/a	n/a	n/a	n/a	n/a
2021					P. Lodge, F. Caldow
2022					L. Ewington
2023	Brayden Irving				D.Jordan, T.Unitt, E. O'Murchu, D.Radis
2024	Brayden Irving				R. Leumann
2025	Brayden Irving				B. Irving

Retired jumper numbers:

- K.Schubert - Number 4. Retired in 1996.
- M.Tunley - Number 11. Retired in 2001.
- S.Percy - Number 55. Retired in 2003.
- J.Cumming - Number 13. Retired in 2009.
