= AFL Britain =

Australian rules football governing body

- Sport: Australian rules football
- Jurisdiction: National
- Founded: 1989
- Affiliation: Australian Football League
- Replaced: British Australian Rules Football League
- Closure date: 2012
- (United Kingdom)

AFL Britain, also referred to as AFL Great Britain was established in 1989 as the governing body for Australian rules football in England, Wales and Scotland. It was formed in 2008, replacing the British Australian Rules Football League (BARFL) as national body.

By 2012, Wales and Scotland had created their own autonomous bodies governing the sport of Australian rules football and AFL Britain was superseded by AFL England.

== See also ==
- Australian Rules Football in England
- Australian rules football in Scotland
- Australian rules football in the United Kingdom
