= Sutton Hoo helmet =

Decorated Anglo-Saxon helmet

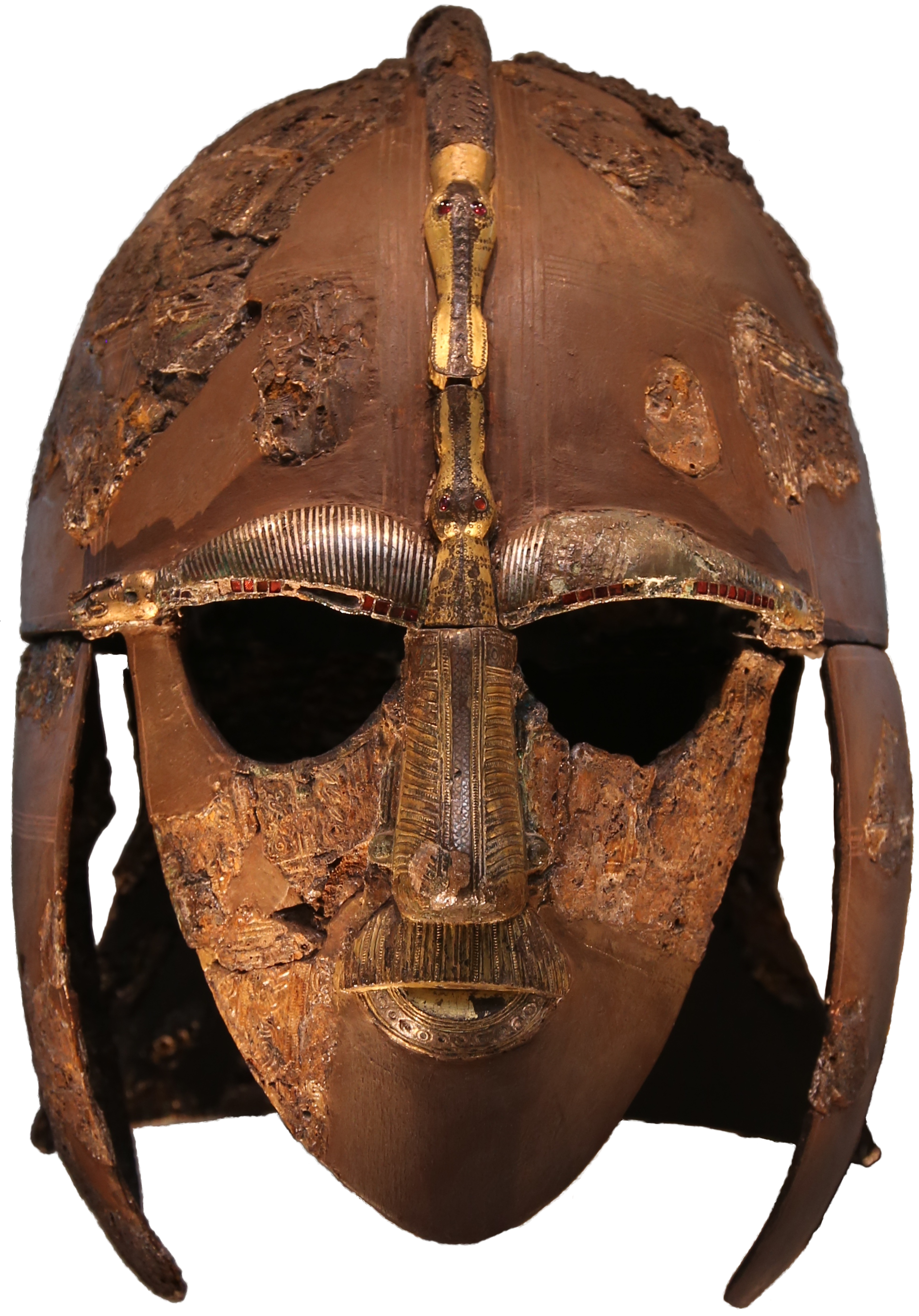
- Latest reconstruction (assembled 1970–1971) of the Sutton Hoo helmet
- Material: Iron, bronze, tin, gold, silver, garnets
- Weight: 2.5 kg (5.5 lb) estimated
- Discovered: 1939; Sutton Hoo, Suffolk; 52°05′21″N 01°20′17″E
- Discovered by: Charles Phillips
- Present location: British Museum, London
- Registration: 1939,1010.93

The Sutton Hoo helmet is a decorated Anglo-Saxon helmet found during a 1939 excavation of the Sutton Hoo ship-burial. It was thought to be buried around the years c. 620–625 AD and is widely associated with an Anglo-Saxon leader, King Rædwald of East Anglia; its elaborate decoration may have given it a secondary function akin to a crown. The helmet was both a functional piece of armour and a decorative piece of metalwork. An iconic object from an archaeological find hailed as the "British Tutankhamen", it has become a symbol of the Early Middle Ages, "of Archaeology in general", and of England.

The visage contains eyebrows, a nose, and moustache, creating the image of a man joined by a dragon's head to become a soaring dragon with outstretched wings. It was excavated as hundreds of rusted fragments; first displayed following an initial reconstruction in 1945–46, it took its present form after a second reconstruction in 1970–71.

The helmet and the other artefacts from the site were determined to be the property of Edith Pretty, owner of the land on which they were found. She donated them to the British Museum, where the helmet is on permanent display in Room 41.

== Background ==
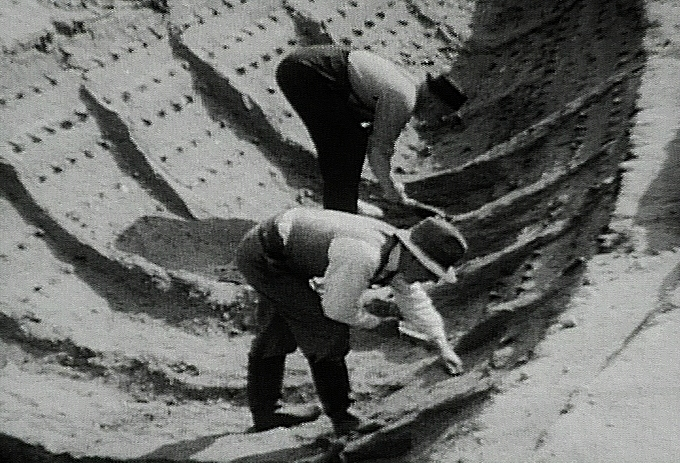
The ship impression during the 1939 excavation; Basil Brown is in the foreground, and Lieutenant Commander John Kenneth Douglas Hutchison in the background.

The helmet was buried among other regalia and instruments of power as part of a furnished ship-burial, probably dating from the early seventh century. The ship had been hauled from the nearby river up the hill and lowered into a prepared trench. Inside this, the helmet was wrapped in cloths and placed to the left of the head of the body. An oval mound was constructed around the ship. Long afterwards, the chamber roof collapsed violently under the weight of the mound, compressing the ship's contents into a seam of earth.

It is thought that the helmet was shattered either by the collapse of the burial chamber or by the force of another object falling on it. That the helmet had shattered meant it was possible to reconstruct it. Had the helmet been crushed before the iron had fully oxidised, leaving it still pliant, the helmet would have been squashed, leaving it in a distorted shape similar to the Vendel and Valsgärde helmets.

== Owner ==
Attempts to identify the person buried in the ship-burial have persisted since virtually the moment the grave was unearthed. The preferred candidate, with some exceptions when the burial was thought to have taken place later, has been Rædwald; his kingdom, East Anglia, is believed to have had its seat at Rendlesham, 4 1/4 miles (6.8 kilometres) upriver from Sutton Hoo. The case for Rædwald, by no means conclusive, rests on the dating of the burial, the abundance of wealth and items identified as regalia, and, befitting a king who kept two altars, the presence of both Christian and pagan influences.

=== Rædwald ===
What scant information is known about King Rædwald of East Anglia, according to the Anglo-Saxon historian Simon Keynes, could fit "on the back of the proverbial postage stamp". Almost all that is recorded comes from the eighth-century Historia ecclesiastica gentis Anglorum by the Benedictine monk Bede, leaving knowledge of Rædwald's life, already poorly recorded, at the mercy of such things as differing interpretations of Ecclesiastical Latin syntax. Bede writes that Rædwald was the son of Tytila and grandson of Wuffa, from whom the East Anglian Wuffingas dynasty derived its name. In their respective works Flores Historiarum and Chronica Majora, the thirteenth-century historians Roger of Wendover and Matthew Paris appear to place Tytila's death, and Rædwald's presumed concurrent succession to the throne, in 599. (Note: These works actually record 599 as the year of Rædwald's death, before recording his death again in 624. The former record appears to be a scribal error in which Tytila's death was mistranscribed.) Yet as reasonable as this date sounds, these historians' demonstrated difficulty with even ninth-century dates leaves ample room for doubt.

In any event, Rædwald would have ascended to power by at least 616, around when Bede records him as raising an army on behalf of Edwin of Northumbria and defeating Æthelfrith in a battle on the east bank of the River Idle. According to Bede, Rædwald had almost accepted a bribe from Æthelfrith to turn Edwin over, before Rædwald's wife persuaded him to value friendship and honour over treasure. After the ensuing battle, during which Bede says Rædwald's son Rægenhere was slain, Rædwald's power was probably significant enough to merit his inclusion in a list of seven kings said by Bede to have established rule over all of England south of the River Humber, termed an imperium; (Note: A lack of syntactical precision by Bede has led to at least four different interpretations of his description of Rædwald reign. Bede's Latin reads "quartus Reduald rex Orientalium Anglorum, qui etiam uiuente Aedilbercto eidem suae genti ducatum praebebat, obtenuit". The traditional interpretation has been that even during the life of Æthelberht of Kent, Rædwald was building his imperium. A second, controversial, reading states that Rædwald gained his imperium during Æthelberht's life, but allowed him to continue to rule Kent. A third take suggests that Æthelberht held his rule throughout his life, and that during this time Rædwald conceded rule over East Anglia to him. Finally, a fourth translation interprets Æthelberht's reign as beginning to crumble before his death, and losing control of East Anglia to Rædwald.) the ninth-century Anglo-Saxon Chronicle expanded Bede's list to eight and applied the term bretwalda or brytenwalda, literally "ruler of Britain" or "ruler of the Britains". (Note: "Bede's Magnificent Seven", as Keynes terms them, were Ælle of Sussex, Ceawlin of Wessex, Æthelberht of Kent, Rædwald, Edwin of Northumbria, Oswald of Northumbria, and Oswiu. The Anglo-Saxon Chronicle added Ecgberht of Wessex to this list.)

Bede records Rædwald converting to Christianity while on a trip to Kent, only to be dissuaded by his wife upon his return; afterwards he kept a temple with two altars, one pagan and one Christian. In the likely event that this was during Æthelberht's rule of Kent, it would have been sometime before Æthelberht's death around 618. Rædwald's own death can be conservatively dated between 616 and 633 if using Bede, whose own dates are not unquestioned. Anything more specific relies on questionable post-Conquest sources. Roger of Wendover claims without attribution that Rædwald died in 624. The twelfth-century Liber Eliensis places the death of Rædwald's son Eorpwald, who had by then succeeded his father, in 627, meaning Rædwald would have died before then. If relying solely on Bede, all that can be said is that Rædwald died sometime between his circa 616 defeat of Æthelfrith along the River Idle, and 633, when Edwin, who after Rædwald died converted Eorpwald to Christianity, died.

==== Date ====
A precise date for the Sutton Hoo burial is needed for any credible attempt to identify its honoree. Thirty-seven gold Merovingian coins found alongside the other objects offer the most objective means of dating the burial. The coins—in addition to three blanks, and two small ingots—were found in a purse, and are themselves objects of considerable interest. (Note: The utility of the coins as a dating mechanism was recognised from the outset, but their purpose in the context of a 7th-century burial was less clear. If mere evidence of wealth, the coins would be surprisingly meagre; at just more than 61 grams between coins, blanks, and ingots—the former two of which are approximately equal to a Germanic shilling each and the latter of which are each about four shillings in weight—the overall weight barely equals the amount of gold in even a minor piece of jewellery from the burial. The great gold buckle itself weighs 412.7 g (0.910 lb). Moreover, there would be no need to round out the real coins with unstruck blanks and ingots. One theory suggests that the number of coins is more important than their weight and mintage, and that it coincides with the number of oarsmen, suggested to be 40. The gold could thus be a "Charon's obol", one coin apiece for the supernatural oarsmen, and two ingots for the steersman, who would carry the interred into the other world.) Until 1960, and largely on the basis of numismatic chronologies established during the 19th century, the Sutton Hoo coins were generally dated to 650–660 AD. With this range the burial was variously attributed to such monarchs as Æthelhere, Anna, Æthelwald, Sigeberht, and Ecgric, all of whom ruled and died in or around the given period.

The proposed range of years, and accordingly the regnal attributions, was modified by later studies that took the specific gravity of some 700 Merovingian gold coins, which with some predictability were minted with decreasing purity over time, to estimate the date of a coin based on the fineness of its gold. This analysis suggests that the latest coins in the purse were minted between 613 and 635 AD, and most likely closer to the beginning of this range than the end. The range is a tentative terminus post quem for the burial, before which it may not have taken place; sometime later, perhaps after a period of years, the coins were collected and buried. These dates are generally consistent, but not exclusive, with Rædwald.

==== Regalia ====
The presence of items identified as regalia has been used to support the idea that the burial commemorates a king. Some jewellery likely had significance beyond its richness. The shoulder-clasps suggest a ceremonial outfit. The weight of the great gold buckle is comparable to the price paid in recompense for the death of a nobleman; its wearer thus wore the price of a nobleman's life on his belt, a display of impunity that could be associated with few others besides a king. The helmet displays both wealth and power, with a modification to the sinister eyebrow subtly linking the wearer to the one-eyed Germanic god Odin.

Two other items, a "wand" and a whetstone, exhibit no practical purpose, but may have been perceived as instruments of power. The so-called wand or rod, surviving only as a 96 mm (3.8 in) gold and garnet strip with a ring at the top, associated mountings, and traces of organic matter that may have been wood, ivory, or bone, has no discernible use but as a symbol of office. On the other hand, the whetstone is theoretically functional as a sharpening stone, but exhibits no evidence of such use. Its delicate ornamentation, including a carved head with a modified eye that parallels the possible allusion to Odin on the helmet, suggests that it too was a ceremonial object, and it has been tentatively identified as a sceptre. (Note: As T. D. Kendrick wrote in 1939, "Nothing like this monstrous stone exists anywhere else. It is a unique, savage thing; and inexplicable, except perhaps as a symbol, proper to the King himself, of the divinity and the mystery which surrounded the smith and his tools in the northern world.")

==== Syncretism ====
Further evidence for the burial's association with Rædwald has been adduced from the presence of items with both Christian and pagan significance. The burial is in most respects emphatically pagan; as a ship-burial, it is the manifestation of a pagan practice predating the Gregorian reintroduction of Christianity into Britain, and may have served as an implicit rejection of the encroaching Frankish Christianity. Three groups of items, however, have clear Christian influences: two scabbard bosses, ten silver bowls, and two silver spoons. The bowls and scabbard bosses each display crosses, the former with chasing and the latter with cloisonné. The spoons are even more closely associated with the Catholic Church, inscribed as they are with a cross, and the names ΠΑΥΛΟΣ (Paulos) and ΣΑΥΛΟΣ (Saulos), both names were used by Paul the Apostle. (Note: Both spoons may have been intended to have been engraved with the same ΠΑΥΛΟΣ, however, as the first letter of the latter inscription may have been made in error.) Even if not baptismal spoons, invoking the conversion of Paul—a theory which has been linked to Rædwald's conversion at Kent—they are unmistakably associated with Christianity.

=== Others ===
Rædwald may be the easiest name to attach to the Sutton Hoo ship-burial, but for all the attempts to do so, these arguments have been made with more vigour than persuasiveness. The desire to link a burial with a known name, and a famous one, outstrips the evidence. The burial is certainly a commemorative display of both wealth and power, but does not necessarily memorialise Rædwald, or a king; theoretically, the ship-burial could have even been a votive offering. The case for Rædwald depends heavily on the dating of the coins, yet the current dating is only precise within two decades, and Merovingian coin chronologies have shifted before.

The case for Rædwald depends on the assumption that modern conceptions of Middle Age wealth and power are accurate. The wealth of the Sutton Hoo ship-burial is astonishing because there are no contemporaneous parallels, but the lack of parallels could be a quirk of survival just as much as it could be an indicator of Rædwald's wealth. Many other Anglo-Saxon barrows have been ploughed over or looted, and so just as little is known about contemporary kingliness, little is known about contemporary kingly graves; if there was any special significance to the items termed regalia, it could have been religious instead of kingly significance, and if anything of kingly graves is known, it is that the graves of even the mere wealthy contained riches that any king would be happy to own. Distinguishing between graves of chieftains, regents, kings, and status-seeking arrivistes is difficult. When Mul of Kent, the brother of King Cædwalla of Wessex, was killed in 687, the price paid in recompense was equivalent to a king's weregild. If the lives of a king and his brother were equal, their graves might be equally hard to tell apart.

Rædwald thus remains a possible but uncertain identification. As the British Museum's former director Sir David M. Wilson wrote, while Rædwald may have been buried at Sutton Hoo, "the little word may should be brought into any identification of Rædwald. After all it may or even might be Sigeberht who died in the early 630s, or it might be his illegitimate brother if he had one (and most people did), or any other great man of East Anglia from 610 to 650."

== Description ==
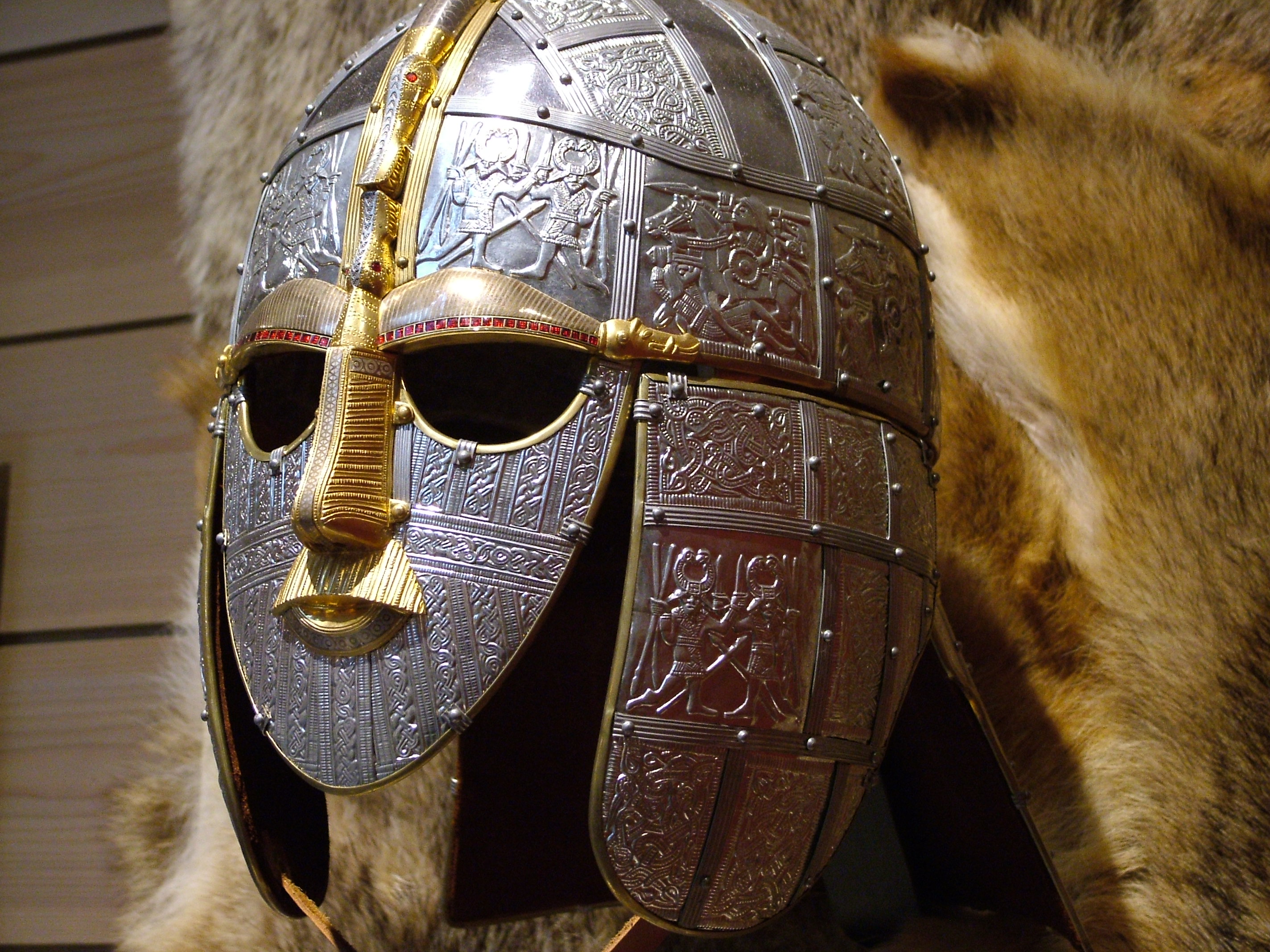
A replica helmet showing designs 1, 2, 4 and 5, located (1) above the eyebrows and on the cheek guard, (2) on the skull cap, (4) on the cheek guard (Note: The impression of design 4 on the top left corner of the replica cheek guard is actually upside down.) and skull cap, and (5) on the face mask

Weighing an estimated 2.5 kg (5.5 lb), the Sutton Hoo helmet was made of iron and covered with decorated sheets of tinned bronze. Fluted strips of moulding divided the exterior into panels, each of which was stamped with one of five designs. Two depict figural scenes, another two zoophormic interlaced patterns; a fifth pattern, known only from seven small fragments and incapable of restoration, is known to occur only once on an otherwise symmetrical helmet and may have been used to replace a damaged panel.

The existence of these five designs has been generally understood since the first reconstruction, published in 1947. (Note: With that said, the evidence for the unidentified design has changed over time, from one piece which later turned out to be part of design 2, to the seven pieces recognised today. Maryon suggested an unidentified design because of a single piece showing "a solitary leg, from knee to foot, about 1/2 inch [13 mm] high". Williams's reconstruction moved this piece from the rear edge of the skull cap to the top centre of the crest, where it was revealed to be a part of the second design after all. The existence of an unidentified pattern was thus putatively eliminated when Bruce-Mitford claimed in his 1972 article on the new reconstruction that there were only four designs; even in the first volume of The Sutton Hoo Ship-Burial, published in 1975, he referred to the unidentified scene in the past tense, stating that "at the time of the re-excavation [1965] it was believed that there was a third figural scene on the helmet". Indications of a third scene did not return until volume two of the same work, published in 1978, where seven small fragments were discussed as being incapable of placement within the four known designs.) The succeeding three decades gave rise to an increased understanding of the designs and their parallels in contemporary imagery, allowing possible reconstructions of the full panels to be advanced, and through the second reconstruction their locations on the surface of the helmet to be redetermined. As referred to below, the designs are numbered according to Rupert Bruce-Mitford's 1978 work.

=== Construction ===
The core of the helmet was made of iron and consisted of a cap from which hung a face mask and cheek and neck guards. The cap was beaten into shape from a single piece of metal. (Note: While it seems most likely that the cap was made from a single piece of metal, its fragmentary state prevents this from being conclusively proven. Radiographs reveal no pieces joined by welding, forging or riveting, while certain fragments at the crown demonstrate that the iron ran continuously under the crest.) On either side of it were hung iron cheek guards, deep enough to protect the entire side of the face, and curved inward both vertically and horizontally. Two hinges per side, possibly made of leather, supported these pieces, allowing them to be pulled flush with the face mask and fully enclose the face.

A neck guard was attached to the back of the cap and made of two overlapping pieces: a shorter piece set inside the cap, over which attached a wide fan-like segment extending downwards, "straight from top to bottom but curved laterally to follow the line of the neck." The inset portion afforded the neck guard extra movement, and like the cheek guards was attached to the cap by leather hinges. Finally, the face mask was riveted to the cap on both sides and above the nose. Two cutouts served as eye openings, while a third opened into the hollow of the overlaid nose, thereby facilitating access to the two nostril-like holes underneath; though small, these holes would have been among the few sources of fresh air for the wearer.

Atop the foundational layer of iron were placed decorative sheets of tinned bronze. These sheets, divided into five figural or zoomorphic designs, were manufactured by the pressblech process. Preformed dies similar to the Torslunda plates were covered with thin metal which, through applied force, took up the design underneath; identical designs could thus be mass-produced from the same die, allowing for their repeated use on the helmet and other objects. (Note: This technique is distinguished from repoussé work, a much more labor intensive process. Repoussé work uses small punches to raise individual details from behind a metal sheet, which are then refined from the front by chasing, whereas pressblech work raises a design in one operation from a single die. Permutations of pressblech work involving multiple operations do, however, exist. The die used for design 5 on the Sutton Hoo helmet, for example, appears to have had a billeted border on only one each of its long and short sides, while on the neck guard the design is seen with borders along both long sides. "If the die was applied not one impression at a time but as seen on the face-mask, as a continuous series of impressions carefully juxtaposed, on a large sheet of foil, this could be cut in such a way as to leave the pattern with double borders down each side. It seems that this was the method used on the neck-guard.") Fluted strips of white alloyed moulding—possibly of tin and copper, and possibly swaged—divided the designs into framed panels, held to the helmet by bronze rivets. The two strips running from front to back alongside the crest were gilded. The edges of the helmet were further protected by U-shaped brass tubing, fastened by swaged bronze clips and themselves further holding in place the pressblech panels that shared edges with the helmet.

A final layer of adornments added to the helmet a crest, eyebrows, nose and mouth piece, and three dragon heads. A hollow iron crest ran across the top of the cap and terminated at front and back. It was made of D-sectioned tubing and consisted of two parts, an inverted U-shaped piece into the bottom of which a flat strip was placed. As no traces of solder remain, the crest may have been either forged or shrunk on to the cap. From either end of the crest extended an iron tang, to each of which was riveted a gilded dragon head. That on the front was made of cast bronze, while the one on the rear was made of another alloy, and has now mostly degraded into tin oxide.

A third dragon head, cast in bronze, faced upwards on the front of the helmet and broke the plane between face mask and cap; its neck rested on the face mask, while under its eyes it was held to the cap by a large rivet shank. To either side of the neck projected a hollow cast bronze eyebrow, into each of which was inlaid parallel silver wires. Terminal boar heads were gilded, as were the undersides of the eyebrows, where individual bronze cells held square garnets. The eyebrows were riveted on, both to the cap at their outer ends and to the tang of a nose and mouth piece which extended upwards underneath the neck of the dragon head. This tang was itself riveted to the cap, one of five attachment points for the cast bronze nose and mouth piece.

Both sides of the nose featured "two small round projecting plates," connected by fluted and swaged strips, and concealing rivets. An inlaid strip of wire extended the length of the nasal ridge, next to which the "background was punched down" and filled with niello or another metallic inlay, leaving "triangles in relief" that were silvered. A tracer (a "rather blunt chisel . . . used chiefly for outlining") was used to provide a grooved border on each side. Running horizontally aside the nasal bridge were three punched circles per side, inlaid with silver and possibly surrounded by niello.

Beneath these circles, also running horizontally from the centre of the nose to its sides were chased "alternate rows of plain flutings and billeted strips which run obliquely between the central strip and a billeted lower edge." This same pattern is repeated in vertical fashion on the moustache. The curve along the bevelled lower lip, in turn, repeats the circled pattern used on the nasal bridge. Excepting the portions covered by the eyebrows and dragon head, or adorned with silver or niello, (Note: Maryon states that niello was used to separate the inlaid silver wires of the eyebrows, to fill in the punched-down designs on the nasal ridge, and to surround the punched circles on the nasal bridge and lower lip. Oddy, however, does not identify the helmet among the objects in the Sutton Hoo burial that exhibit the use of niello—the shield, the large hanging bowl, the great gold buckle, and the drinking horns. With regards to the suggestion of niello on the nose, Oddy states that "[t]he metal of which these inlays are made is compact and is not corroded. In view of its condition it must be interpreted as a metallic inlay and not as niello which has subsequently been reduced to silver metal.") the nose and mouth piece was heavily gilded, which is suggested by the presence of mercury to have been done with the fire-gilding method.

Breaking the symmetry of the helmet are subtle differences in the two eyebrows, and in the methods employed to fashion the cloisonné garnets. The dexter and sinister eyebrows, though at first glance identical, may have been "manufactured in different ways while being intended to look essentially the same." The dexter brow is approximately 5 millimetres shorter than the sinister, and contained 43 rather than 46 inlaid silver wires and one or two fewer garnets. (Note: Bruce-Mitford suggests there were 23 garnets in the dexter eyebrow and 25 in the sinister, but a technical report appending the chapter posits 21 and 22 respectively.) Gilding on the dexter eyebrow was "reddish in colour" against the "yellowish" hue of the sinister, while the latter contains both trace amounts of mercury and a tin corrosion product which are absent from its counterpart. Moreover, while the individual bronze cells into which the garnets are set, both on the dexter brow and on three of the four remaining dragon eyes, are underlain by small pieces of "hatched gold foil," those on the sinister side, and the sinister eye of the upper dragon head, have no such backing. The gold backing served to reflect light back through the garnets, increasing their lustre and deepening their colour. Where this backing was missing on the sinister eyebrow and one dragon eye, the luminosity of the garnets may have been dimmed by direct placement against the bronze.

=== Dragon motifs ===
The winged dragon motif from the front of the helmet, with eyebrows for wings and the nose and mouth piece for body and tail

Three dragon heads are represented on the helmet. Two bronze-gilt dragon heads feature on either end of the iron crest running from the front to the rear of the skull cap. The third sits at the junction between the two eyebrows, facing upward and given fuller form by the eyebrows, nose and moustache to create the impression of a dragon in flight. The dragon, or bird, soars upwards, and in the dramatic focal point of the helmet, bares its teeth at the snake-like dragon flying down the crest.

To the extent that the helmet is jewelled, such decoration is largely confined to the elements associated with the dragons. Convex garnets sunk into the heads give the dragons red eyes. The eyebrows are likewise inlaid with square garnets on their under edges, continuing outwards on each side to where they terminate in gilded boars' heads; in addition to their secondary decorative function as wings, the eyebrows may therefore take on a tertiary form as boars' bodies. The subtle differences between the eyebrows, the left of which lacks the gold foil backing employed on the right, may suggest an allusion to the one-eyed god Odin; seen in low light, with the garnets of only one eye reflecting light, the helmet may have itself seemed to have only one eye. (Note: An alternative theory suggests that the discrepancy between eyebrows is the result of a repair job. "That the absence of foils might result from a repair," however, "and presumably therefore a shortage of gold, seems unlikely in view of the minute quantities needed. Additionally, given the evident skill required to shape the gold cell walls and cut the garnets so precisely, the decision to omit the gold foils on the left eyebrow appears all the more deliberate." The repair theory does not account for the absence of gold foil behind one of the garnet dragon eyes. On the other hand, a repair could explain the other subtle differences between the eyebrows, such as their slightly different lengths and colours, which are not addressed by the theorized allusion to Odin.)

More gold covers the eyebrows, nose and mouth piece, and dragon heads, as it does the two fluted strips that flank the crest. The crest and eyebrows are further inlaid with silver wires. Combined with the silvery colour of the tinned bronze, the effect was "an object of burnished silvery metal, set in a trelliswork of gold, surmounted by a crest of massive silver, and embellished with gilded ornaments, garnets and niello—in its way a magnificent thing and one of the outstanding masterpieces of barbaric art."

=== Design 1: Dancing warriors ===
Design 1, with elements known from fragments in silver, and reconstructed elements in gold

The dancing warriors scene is known from six fragments and occurs four times on the helmet. It appears on the two panels immediately above the eyebrows, accounting for five of the fragments. The sixth fragment is placed in the middle row of the dexter cheek guard, on the panel closest to the face mask; the generally symmetrical nature of the helmet implies the design's position on the opposite side as well. None of the six pieces shows both warriors, although the "key fragment" depicts their crossed wrists. A full reconstruction of the scene was inferred after the first reconstruction, when Rupert Bruce-Mitford spent six weeks in Sweden and was shown a nearly identical design on the then unpublished Valsgärde 7 helmet.

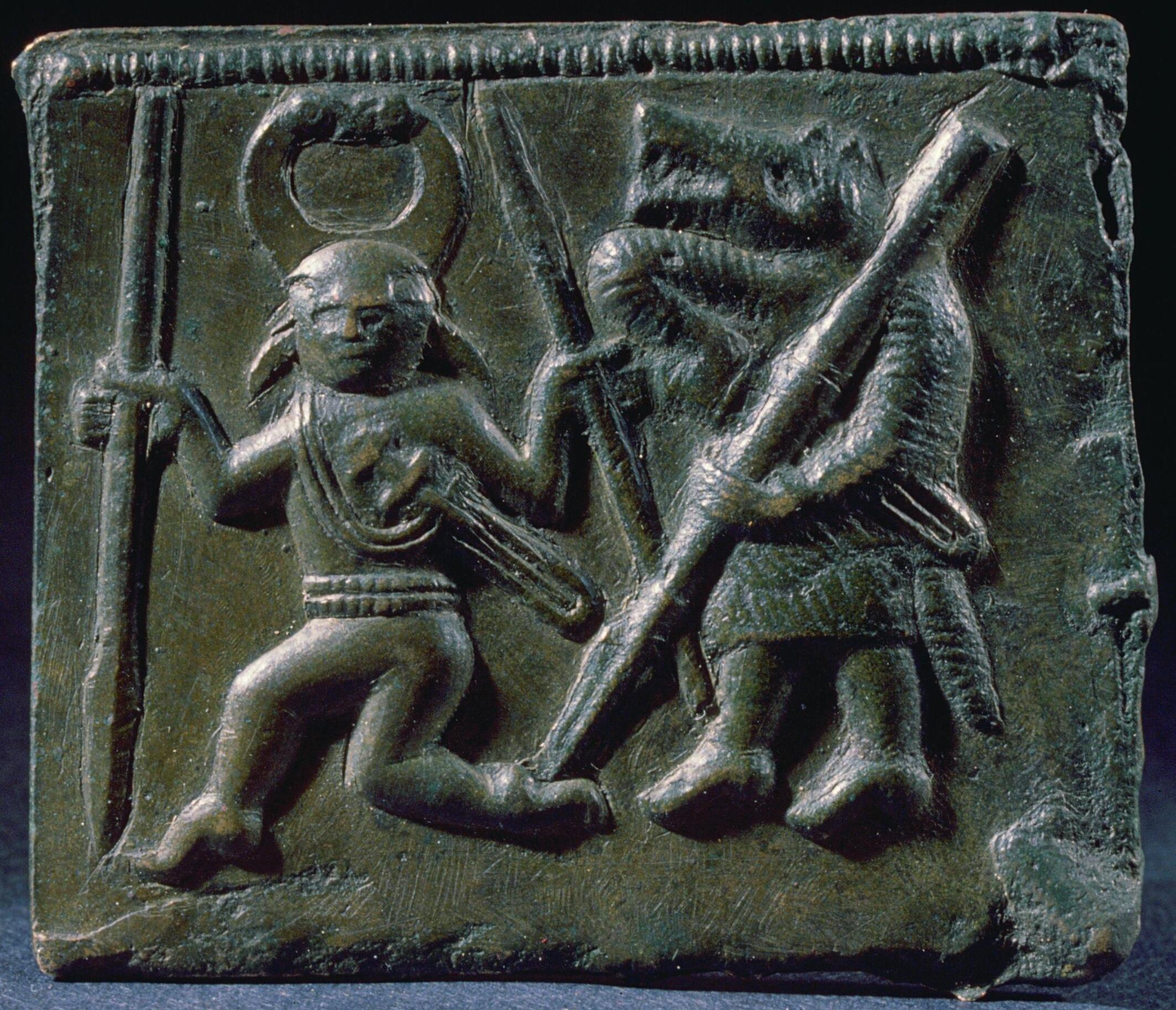
One of the four Torslunda plates (plate: 618349_HST), showing a horned figure similar to those in design 1. His missing right eye suggests that he is Odin. (Note: The image appears as it would once mounted on a helmet. The eye that was struck from the plate is the leftmost eye from the perspective of one viewing the plate—i.e., that which is furthest from the animal-like figure—but the right eye from the perspective of the possible Odin figure.)

Design 1 pictures two men "in civilian or ceremonial dress" perhaps engaged in a spear or sword dance "associated with the cult of Odin, the war-god." Their outer hands each hold two spears, pointed towards their feet, while their crossed hands grip swords. The depiction suggests "intricate measures," "rhythm," and an "elasticity of . . . dance steps." Their trailing outer legs and curved hips imply movement towards each other, and they may be in the climax of the dance.

The prevalence of dance scenes with a "similarity of the presentation of the scheme of movement" in contemporary Scandinavian and Northern art suggests that ritual dances "were well-known phenomena." Sword dances in particular were recorded among the Germanic tribes as early as the first century AD, when Tacitus wrote of "[n]aked youths who practice the sport bound in the dance amid swords and lances," a "spectacle" which was "always performed at every gathering." Whatever the meaning conveyed by the Sutton Hoo example, the "ritual dance was evidently no freak of fashion confined to a particular epoch, but was practised for centuries in a more or less unchanged form."

While many contemporary designs portray ritual dances, at least three examples show scenes exceptionally similar to that on the Sutton Hoo helmet and contribute to the understanding of the depicted sword dance. The same design—identical but for a different type of spears held in hand, a different pattern of dress, and a lack of crossed spears behind the two men—is found on the Valsgärde 7 helmet, while a small fragment of stamped foil from the eastern mound at Gamla Uppsala is "so close in every respect to the corresponding warrior on the Sutton Hoo helmet as to appear at first glance to be from the same die," and may even have been "cut by the same man."

The third similar design is one of the four Torslunda plates, discovered in Öland, Sweden, in 1870. This plate, which is complete and depicts a figure with the same attributes as on design 1, suggests the association of the men in the Sutton Hoo example with "the cult of Odin." The Torslunda figure is missing an eye, which laser scanning revealed to have been removed by a "sharp cut, probably in the original model used for the mould." Odin too lost an eye, thus evidencing the identification of the Torslunda figure as him, and the Sutton Hoo figures as devotees of him.

=== Design 2: Rider and fallen warrior ===
Design 2, with elements known from fragments in silver, and reconstructed elements in gold

Eight fragments and representations comprise all known instances of the second design, It is thought to have originally appeared twelve times on the helmet, although this assumes that the unidentified third design, which occupies one of the twelve panels, was a replacement for a damaged panel. Assuming so, the pattern occupied eight spaces on the lowest row of the skull cap (i.e., all but the two showing design 1), and two panels, one atop the other rising towards the crest, in the centre of each side. All panels showing design 2 appear to have been struck from the same die. The horse and rider thus move in a clockwise direction around the helmet, facing towards the rear of the helmet on the dexter side, and towards the front on the sinister side.

As substantial sections of design 2 are missing, particularly from the "central area," reconstruction relies in part on continental versions of the same scene. In particular, similar scenes are seen on the Valsgärde 7 and 8 helmets, the Vendel 1 helmet, and on the Pliezhausen bracteate. The latter piece, in particular, is both complete and nearly identical to the Sutton Hoo design. Although a mirror image, and lacking in certain details depicted in design 2 such as the sword carried by the rider and the scabbard worn by the fallen warrior, it suggests other details such as the small shield held by the kneeling figure.

Design 2 shows a mounted warrior, spear held overhead, trampling an enemy on the ground. The latter leans upwards and, grasping the reins in his left hand, uses his right hand to thrust a sword into the chest of the horse. Atop the horse's rump kneels a "diminutive human, or at least anthropomorphic figure." The figure is stylistically similar to the horseman. Its arms and legs are positioned identically, and, together with the rider, it clutches the spear with its right hand.

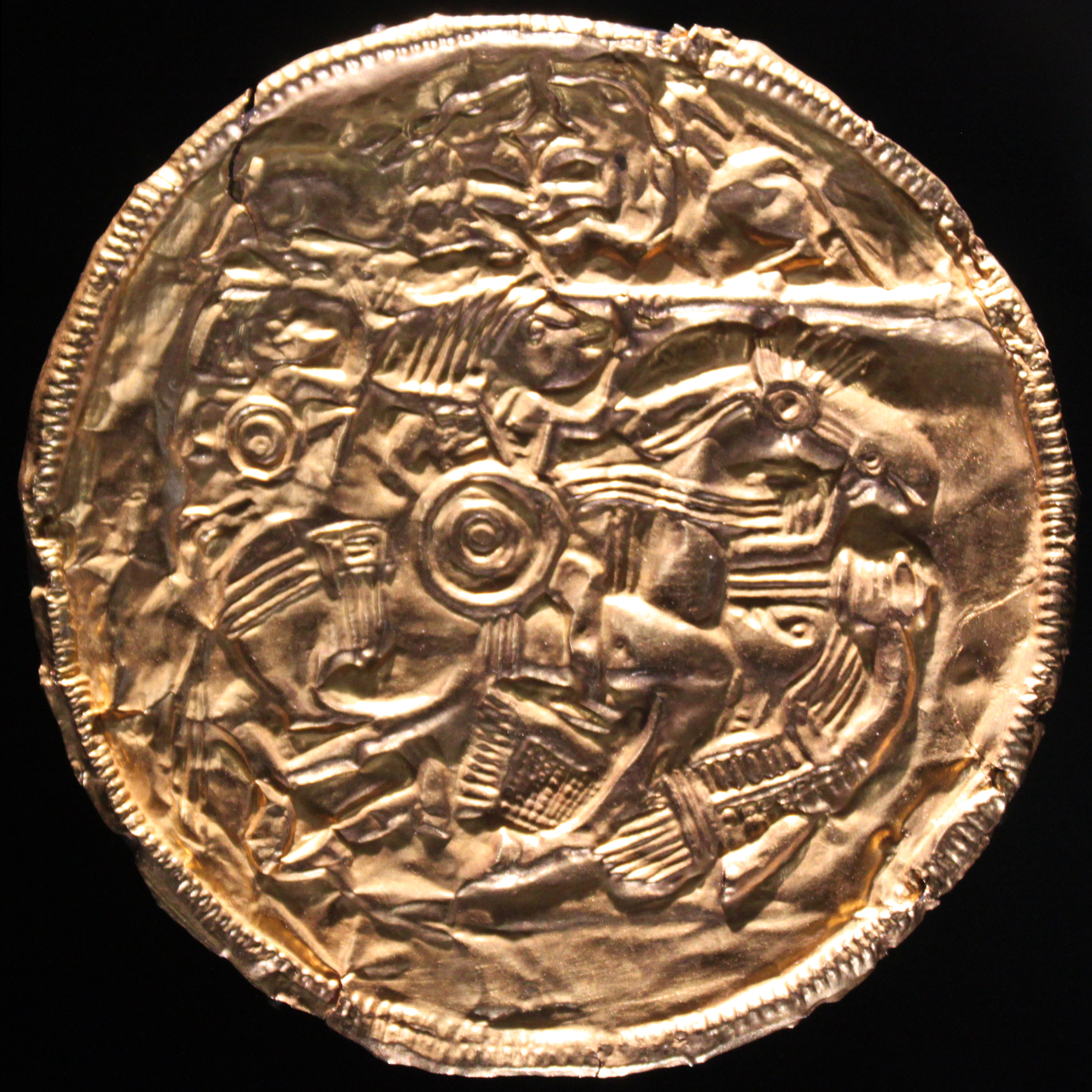
The Pliezhausen bracteate shows a scene nearly identical to design 2.

The iconography underlying design 2 is unknown. It may derive from Roman models, which frequently depicted images of warriors trampling vanquished enemies. The subsequent development of the design, which has been found in England, Denmark, Sweden, and Germany, suggests that it carried a unique meaning broadly understood in Germanic tradition. Whereas the Roman examples show riders in moments of unqualified victory, in Germanic representations the scene is ambiguous.

The symbolism is unclear, and elements of victory are combined with elements of defeat: the rider directs his spear straight forward at an invisible enemy, not down at the visible enemy on the ground; though the enemy is trampled, the rider's horse is dealt a fatal wound; and a small and possibly divine figure hovers behind the rider, its body taking the form of a victorious swastika (Note: Assuming that this figure, which is only partly preserved on the Sutton Hoo helmet, takes the form of the like figure on the Pliezhausen bracteate.) while it seemingly guides the spear. An overarching theme of the design may therefore be that of fate. In this understanding the divine figure, possibly Odin, guides the warrior in battle, but does not completely free him from the deadly threats he faces. The gods are themselves subject to the whims of fate, and can provide only limited help against the rider's enemies.

=== Design 3: Unidentified figural scene ===
The seven unidentified fragments

Seven small fragments suggest a third figural scene somewhere on the Sutton Hoo helmet. They are nevertheless too small and ambiguous to allow for the reconstruction of the scene. Its presence is suggested between one and four times; because other fragments demonstrate the occurrence of design 1 or design 2 on all seven available panels on the sinister side of the helmet, and on the forwardmost two panels on the dexter side (in addition to on the highest dexter panel), placement of design 3 "must have occurred towards the rear of the helmet" on the dexter side.

That which remains of design 3 may suggest that a "variant rider scene" was employed to fix damage to a design 2 panel, similar to how a unique pressblech design on the Valsgärde 6 helmet was likely used in repair. Fragment (a) for example shows groups of parallel raised lines running in correspondence "with changes of angle or direction in the modelled surface, which on the analogy of the Sutton Hoo and other rider scenes in Vendel art, strongly suggest the body of a horse." Though smaller, fragment (d) shows similar patterns and suggests a similar interpretation. Fragment (b), meanwhile, shows "two concentric raised lines two millimetres apart," and "appears to be a segment of the rim of a shield which would be of the same diameter as that held by the rider in design 2."

The theory of design 3 as a replacement panel gains some support from damage towards the back of the helmet, but is contradicted by the placement of fragment (c). The crest, complete for 25.5 cm (10.0 in) from front to back, is missing 2 cm (0.79 in) above the rear dragon head. This head is itself mostly missing, and is absent from the 1945–46 reconstruction. These missing portions are offered by Bruce-Mitford as a possible indication that the helmet at one time suffered damage necessitating the restoration of at least one design 2 panel with a new equestrian scene.

This theory does not explain why the rear crest and dragon head would not have been themselves repaired, however, and it is not helped by fragment (c). This fragment is an edge piece placed in the 1970–71 reconstruction on the dexter rear of the helmet at the bottom left of a panel where either design 2 or design 3 is expected, yet is "an isolated element quite out of context with any other surviving fragment and with what appears to be the subject matter of the design 3 panel." Bruce-Mitford suggests that as it is an edge piece it may have originally been a scrap placed under another piece to fill a gap, for it is "otherwise inexplicable." (Note: Bruce-Mitford appears reluctant to even acknowledge fragment (c) as part of Design 3. Despite writing in 1978 that "[t]he fragment is mounted in the present helmet reconstruction on the right side towards the back," in 1982 he wrote that "none of the fragments that show portions of Design 3 are mounted in the helmet. Since we know neither what this scene depicted, nor how many times it was employed, to place such fragments in the reconstructed helmet could give a false impression both of the subject and of the position it may have occupied in the decorative layout of the helmet." These contradictory statements would be reconciled by accepting Bruce-Mitford's theory that fragment (c) was a scrap, and not meant to be seen.)

=== Design 4: Larger interlace ===

Occurring on the cheek guards, the neck guard and the skull cap, the larger interlace pattern was capable of a complete reconstruction. Unlike the two identified figural scenes, partial die impressions of design 4 were used in addition to full die impressions. Blank spaces on the skull cap and neck guard, devoid of decorative designs, allowed for impressions of design 4 that are nearly or entirely complete. On the cheek guards, by contrast, which are irregularly shaped and fully decorated, the interlace designs appear in partial, and sometimes sideways, fashion.

Design 4 depicts a single animal, or quadruped, in ribbon style, and has a billeted border on all sides. The head of the animal is located in the upper centre of the panel. The eye is defined by two circles; the rest of the head, comprising two separate but intertwined ribbons, surrounds it. A third ribbon, representing the jaws and mouth, is beneath the head. On the left it begins as a small billeted ribbon that descends into a pellet-filled twist, passes under itself, and emerges as a larger billeted ribbon.

Circling counterclockwise, it passes over and then under a separate ribbon that represents the body, under it again, then over and under one of the ribbons representing the head. It emerges as a second pellet-filled twist, again forms a billeted ribbon, and terminates in a shape resembling a foot. A fourth ribbon, forming the animal's neck, starts from the head and travels downwards, under and over a ribbon forming a limb, and terminating in a pellet-filled twist, at the bottom right corner, representing the front hip. Two limbs leave from the hip. One immediately terminates in the border; the second travels upwards as a billeted ribbon, under and over the neck, and ends in another hip ("illogically", per Bruce-Mitford).

Another short limb, filled with pellets, emerges from this hip and terminates in a foot. The animal's body, meanwhile, is formed by another billeted ribbon that connects the front hip in the lower right, with the rear hip, in the top left. From right to left it travels under, under, and over the jaws and mouth, under a billeted ribbon representing legs, and then connects to the rear hip. The rear hip, like the front hip, is connected to two limbs. One is a small, pellet-filled twist. The other travels downwards as a billeted ribbon to the bottom left corner, where it terminates in another hip that connects to a pellet-filled limb, and then a foot.

The design is representative of what Bernhard Salin termed "Design II" Germanic animal ornament.

=== Design 5: Smaller interlace ===
Design 5

The smaller interlace pattern covered the face mask, was used prominently on the neck guard, and filled in several empty spaces on the cheek guards. It is a zoomorphic design, like the larger interlace, and shows "two animals, upside down and reversed in relation to each other, whose backward-turning heads lie towards the centre of the panel."

== Function ==
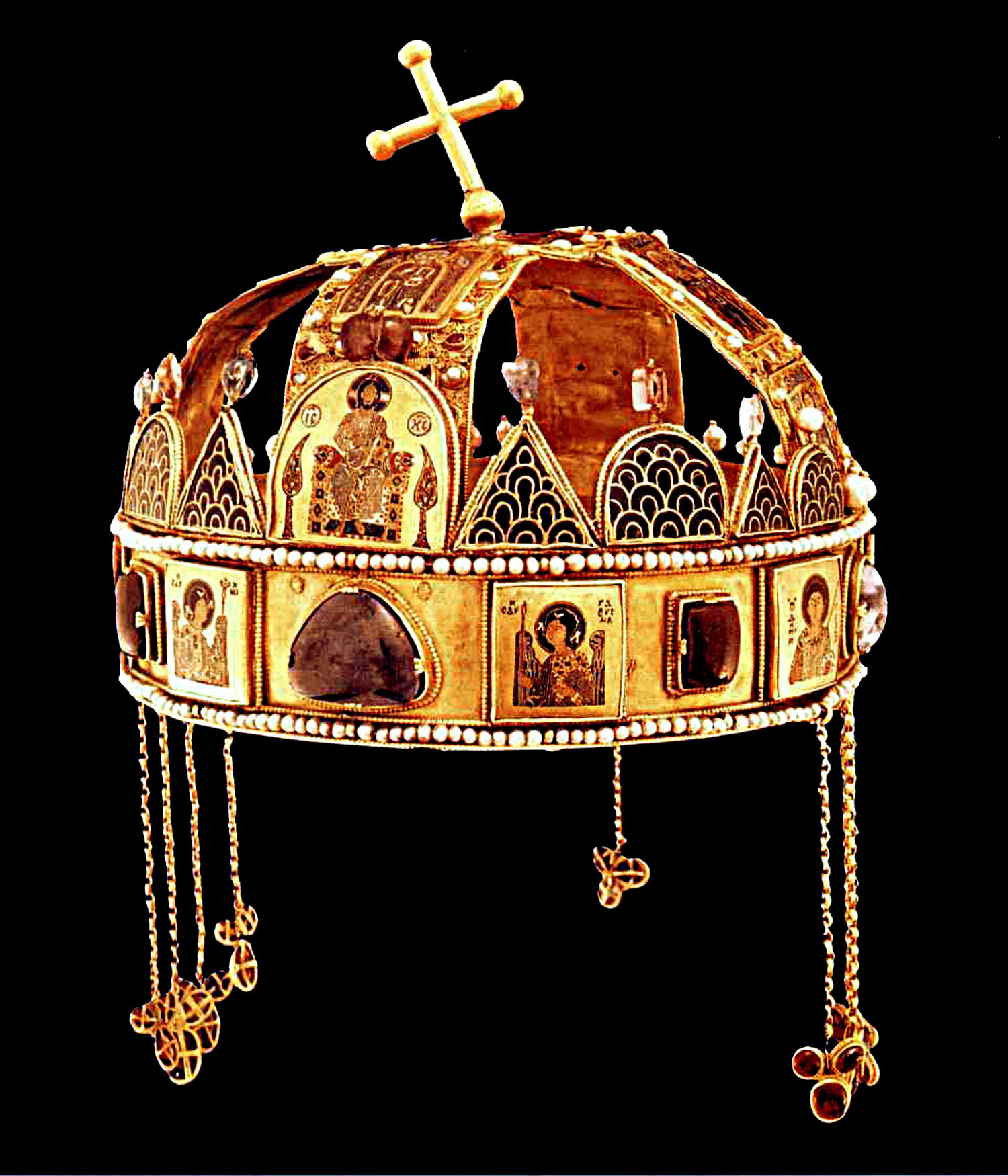
With a brow band, nose-to-nape band, and lateral bands, the twelfth-century crown of Saint Stephen has a similar basic construction to some Anglo-Saxon helmets.

The Sutton Hoo helmet was both a functional piece of battle equipment and a symbol of its owner's power and prestige. It would have offered considerable protection if ever used in battle, and as the richest known Anglo-Saxon helmet, indicated its owner's status. As it is older than the man with whom it was buried, the helmet may have been an heirloom, symbolic of the ceremonies of its owner's life and death; it may further be a progenitor of crowns, known in Europe since around the twelfth century, indicating both a leader's right to rule and his connection with the gods.

Whether or not the helmet was ever worn in battle is unknown, but though delicately ornamented, it would have done the job well. Other than leaving spaces to allow movement of the shoulders and arms, the helmet leaves its wearer's head entirely protected, and unlike any other known helmet of its general type, it has a face mask, one-piece cap, and solid neck guard. The iron and silver crest would have helped deflect the force of falling blows, and holes underneath the nose would have created a breathable—if stifling—environment within. If two suppositions are to be taken as true—that damage to the back of the helmet occurred before the burial, and that Raedwald is properly identified as the helmet's owner—then the helmet can be at least described as one that saw some degree of use during its lifetime, and one that was owned by a person who saw battle.

Beyond its functional purpose, the Sutton Hoo helmet would have served to convey the high status of its owner. Little more than an iron cap, such as the helmets from Shorwell and Wollaston, would be needed if one only sought to protect one's head. Yet helmets were objects of prestige in Anglo-Saxon England, as indicated by archaeological, literary, and historical evidence. Helmets are relatively common in Beowulf, an Anglo-Saxon poem focused on royals and their aristocratic milieu, but rarely found today; only six are currently known, despite the excavation of thousands of graves from the period.

Much as this could reflect poor rates of artefact survival, or even recognition—the Shorwell helmet was at first misidentified as a "fragmentary iron vessel", the Wollaston helmet as a bucket, and a plain Roman helmet from Burgh Castle as "cauldron fragments"—the extreme scarcity suggests that helmets were never deposited in great numbers, and signified the importance of those wearing them.

That the Sutton Hoo helmet was likely around 100 years old when buried suggests that it may have been an heirloom, a sample from the royal treasury passed down from another generation. The same suggestion has been made for the shield from the burial, as both it and the helmet are objects with distinct Swedish influence. The importance of heirloom items is well documented in poetry; every sword of note in Beowulf, from Hrunting to Nægling, has such a history, and the poem's hero, whose own pyre is stacked with helmets, uses his dying words to bestow upon his follower Wiglaf a gold collar, byrnie, and gilded helmet. The passing of the helmet, from warrior to warrior and then to the ground, would have been symbolic of the larger ceremony of the passing of titles and power, and the final elegy for the man buried in the mound.

The helmet easily outstrips all other known examples in terms of richness. It is uniquely from a presumed royal burial, at a time when the monarchy was defined by the helmet and the sword. Helmets, perhaps because they were worn by rulers so frequently, may have come to be identified as crowns. Though many intermediate stages in the typological and functional evolution are yet unknown, the earliest European crowns that survive, such as the turn-of-the-millennium crown of Saint Stephen and of Constance of Aragon, share the same basic construction of many helmets, including the Coppergate example, contemporaneous with the one from Sutton Hoo: a brow band, a nose-to-nape band, and lateral bands. A divine right to rule, or at least a connection between gods and leader—also seen on earlier Roman helmets, which sometimes represented Roman gods—may have been implied by the alteration to the sinister eyebrow on the Sutton Hoo helmet; the one-eyed appearance could only have been visible in low light, such as when its wearer was in a hall, the seat of the king's power.

== Context and parallels ==
Unique in many respects, the Sutton Hoo helmet is nevertheless inextricably linked to its Anglo-Saxon and Scandinavian contexts. It is one of only six known Anglo-Saxon helmets, along with those found at Benty Grange (1848), Coppergate (1982), Wollaston (1997), Shorwell (2004) and Staffordshire (2009), yet is closer in character to finds in Sweden at Vendel (1881–1883) and Valsgärde (1920s). At the same time, the helmet shares "consistent and intimate" parallels with those characterised in the Anglo-Saxon epic Beowulf, and, like the Sutton Hoo ship-burial as a whole, has had a profound impact on modern understandings of the poem.

=== Helmets ===
Within the corpus of sixth- and seventh-century helmets, the Sutton Hoo helmet is broadly classified as a "crested helmet," distinct from the continental spangenhelm and lamellenhelm. 50 helmets are so classified, (Note: This number consolidates the work of multiple scholars. Steuer numbers the helmets from 1 through 30, although he groups the five Vendel examples—three whole, two fragmentary—as #13, and the four Valsgärde examples as #15. His list thus truly encompasses 37 helmets. Tweddle adds six to Steuer's list—a seventh turned out not to be the tenth-century helmet that he suggested, but rather a World War II SSK 90 Luftwaffe helmet manufactured by Siemens—but makes no mention of the fact that Steuer grouped nine helmets into two spots on his list. Tweddle's addition therefore makes 44 (37+6)—not the 37 (30+7) that he claimed. To these may be added the subsequent discoveries from Wollaston, Staffordshire, Horncastle, Uppåkra, Inhåleskullen, and Gevninge, along with the boar from Guilden Morden, for a total of 50 known crested helmets.) although barely more than a dozen can be reconstructed and a few are so degraded that they are not indisputably from helmets. Excepting an outlier fragment found in Kiev, all crested helmets originate from England or Scandinavia.

Of the crested helmets the Sutton Hoo helmet belongs to the Vendel and Valsgärde class, which themselves derive from the Roman infantry and cavalry helmets of the fourth and fifth century Constantinian workshops. Helmets were found in graves 1, 12 and 14 at Vendel (in addition to partial helmets in graves 10 and 11), and in graves 5, 6, 7 and 8 at Valsgärde. The Sutton Hoo example shares similarities in design, yet "is richer and of higher quality" than its Scandinavian analogues; its differences may reflect its manufacture for someone of higher social status, or its closer temporal proximity to the antecedent Roman helmets.

Helmet	Location	/? (Note: Whether or not the artefact is indisputably a helmet.)	Completeness	References
Sutton Hoo	England: Sutton Hoo, Suffolk		Helmet	
Coppergate	England: York		Helmet	
Benty Grange	England: Derbyshire		Helmet	
Wollaston	England: Wollaston, Northamptonshire		Helmet	
Staffordshire	England: Staffordshire		Helmet	
Guilden Morden	England: Guilden Morden, Cambridgeshire		Fragment (boar)	
Caenby	England: Caenby, Lincolnshire	?	Fragment (foil)	
Rempstone	England: Rempstone, Nottinghamshire		Fragment (crest)	
Asthall	England: Asthall, Oxfordshire	?	Fragments (foil)	
Icklingham	England: Icklingham, Suffolk		Fragment (crest)	
Horncastle	England: Horncastle, Lincolnshire		Fragment (crest)	
Tjele	Denmark: Tjele, Jutland		Fragment (eyebrows/nose)	
Gevninge	Denmark: Gevninge, Lejre, Sjælland		Fragment (eye)	
Gjermundbu	Norway: Norderhov, Buskerud		Helmet	
Øvre Stabu	Norway: Øvre Stabu, Toten, Oppland	?	Fragment (crest)	
By	Norway: By, Løten, Hedmarken		Fragment	
Vestre Englaug	Norway: Vestre Englaug, Løten, Hedmarken		Fragment	
Nes	Norway: Nes, Kvelde, Vestfold		Fragment	
Lackalänga	Sweden		Fragment	
Sweden	Sweden: Unknown location (possibly central)		Fragment (crest)	
Solberga	Sweden: Askeby, Östergötland			
Gunnerstad	Sweden: Gamleby, Småland		Fragments	
Prästgården	Sweden: Prästgården, Timrå, Medelpad		Fragments (crest)	
Vendel I	Sweden: Vendel, Uppland		Helmet	
Vendel X	Sweden: Vendel, Uppland		Fragments (crest/camail)	
Vendel XI	Sweden: Vendel, Uppland		Fragments	
Vendel XII	Sweden: Vendel, Uppland		Helmet	
Vendel XIV	Sweden: Vendel, Uppland		Helmet	
Valsgärde 5	Sweden: Valsgärde, Uppland		Helmet	
Valsgärde 6	Sweden: Valsgärde, Uppland		Helmet	
Valsgärde 7	Sweden: Valsgärde, Uppland		Helmet	
Valsgärde 8	Sweden: Valsgärde, Uppland		Helmet	
Gamla Uppsala	Sweden: Gamla Uppsala, Uppland		Fragments (foil)	
Ultuna	Sweden: Ultuna, Uppland		Helmet	
Vaksala	Sweden: Vaksala, Uppland		Fragments	
Vallentuna	Sweden: Vallentuna, Uppland		Fragments	
Landshammar	Sweden: Landshammar, Spelvik, Södermanland		Fragments	
Lokrume	Sweden: Lokrume, Gotland		Fragment	
Broe	Sweden: Högbro Broe, Halla, Gotland		Fragments	
Gotland (3)	Sweden: Endrebacke, Endre, Gotland		Fragment	
Gotland (4)	Sweden: Barshaldershed, Grötlingbo, Gotland		Fragment (crest?)	
Hellvi	Sweden: Hellvi, Gotland		Fragments (eyebrow)	
Gotland (6)	Sweden: Unknown, Gotland		Fragment	
Gotland (7)	Sweden: Hallbjens, Lau, Gotland		Fragments	
Gotland (8)	Sweden: Unknown, Gotland	?	Fragment (crest)	
Gotland (9)	Sweden: Grötlingbo(?), Gotland	?	Fragment (crest)	
Gotland (10)	Sweden: Gudings, Vallstena, Gotland	?	Fragment (crest)	
Gotland (11)	Sweden: Kvie and Allekiva, Endre, Gotland	?	Fragment (crest)	
Uppåkra	Sweden: Uppåkra, Scania		Fragment (eyebrow/boars)	
Desjatinna	Ukraine: Kiev		Fragment (eyebrows/nose)	

==== Anglo-Saxon ====
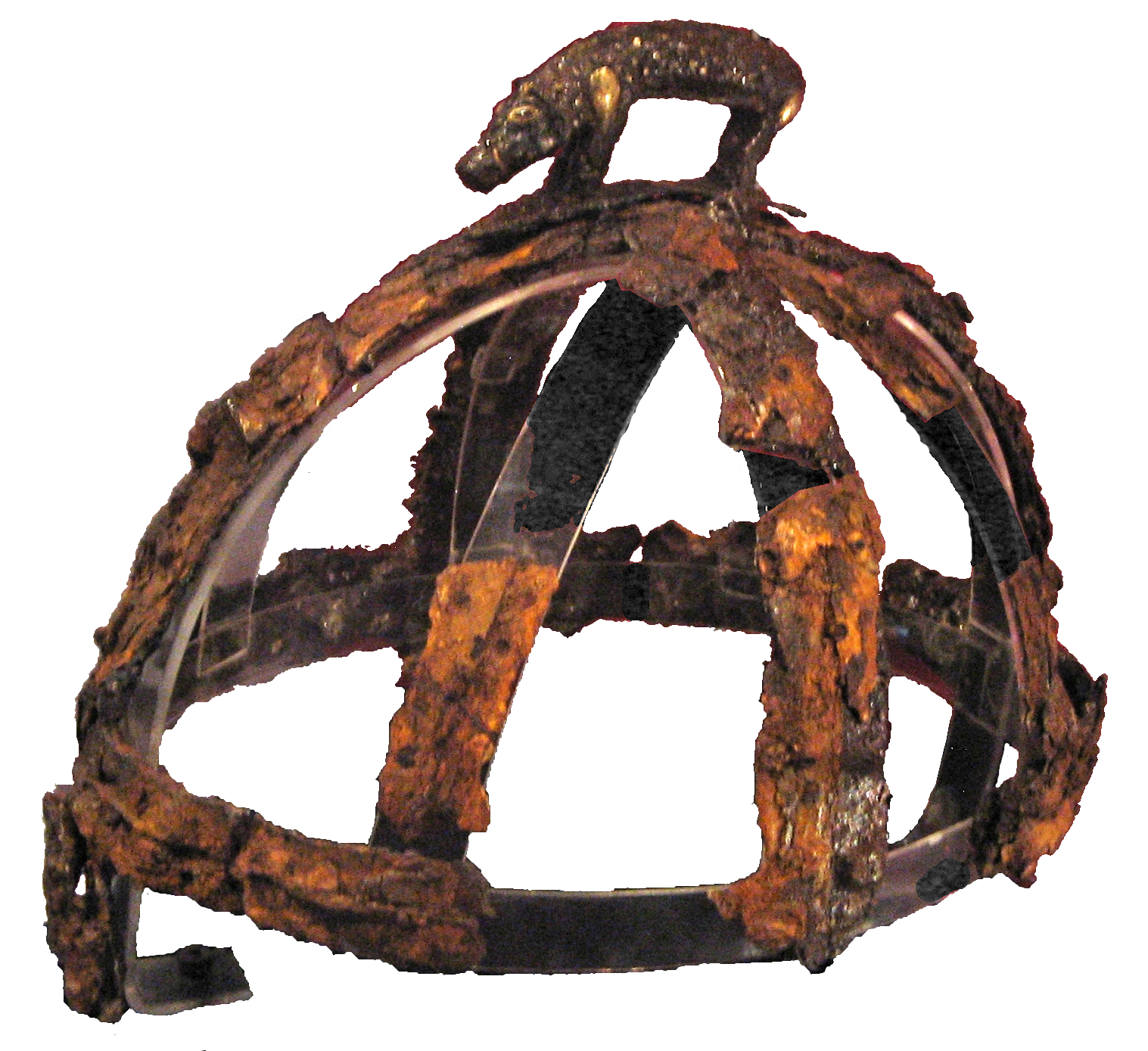
Benty Grange

Shorwell

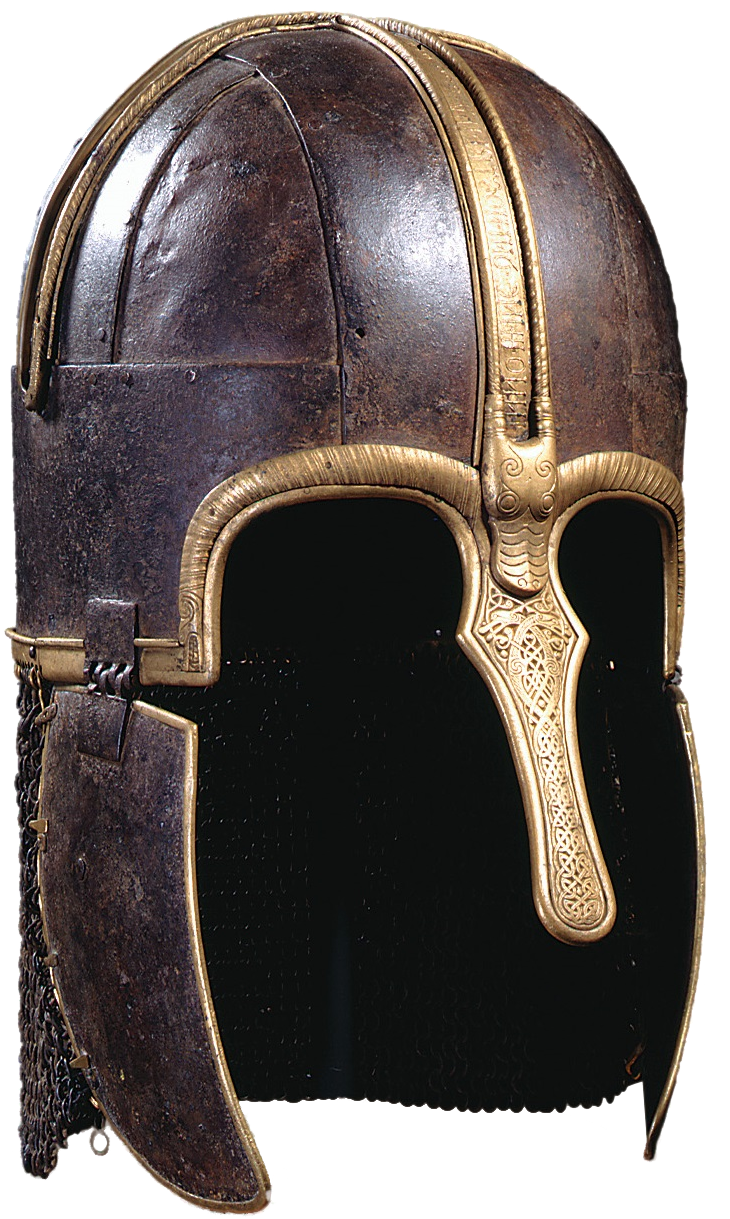
Coppergate

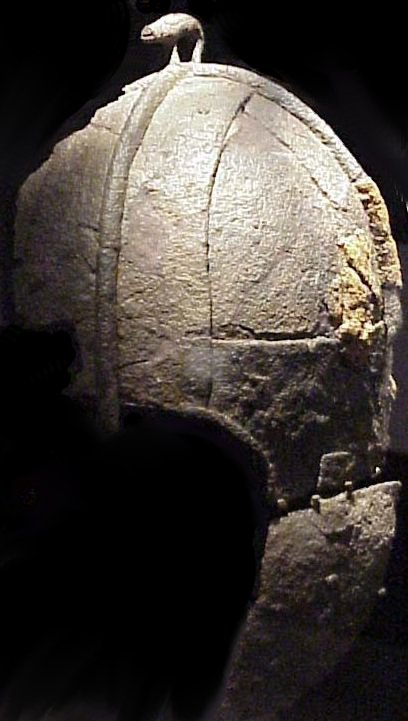
Wollaston

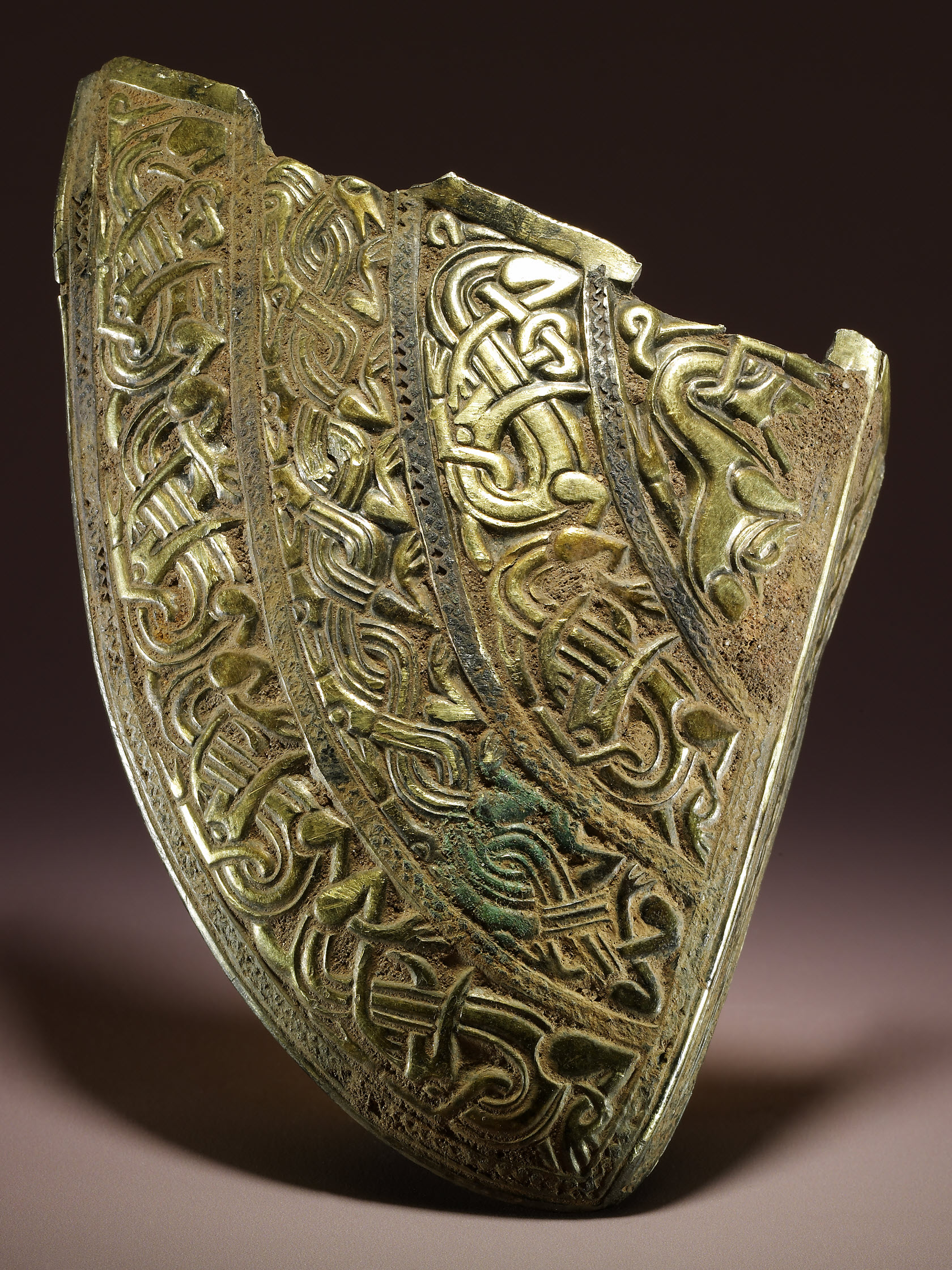
Staffordshire

Although the Staffordshire helmet, currently undergoing research and reconstruction, may prove to be more closely related, the four other known Anglo-Saxon helmets share only minor details in decoration and few similarities in construction with the example from Sutton Hoo. In construction its cheek guards and crest link it to its Anglo-Saxon contemporaries, yet it remains the only helmet to have a face mask, fixed neck guard, or cap raised from a single piece of metal. Decoratively it is linked by its elaborate eyebrows, boar motifs, and wire inlays, but is unparalleled in its extensive ornamentation and pressblech patterns. The similarities likely reflect "a set of traditional decorative motifs which are more or less stable over a long period of time"; the differences may simply highlight the disparity between royal and patrician helmets, or may indicate that the Sutton Hoo helmet was more a product of its Roman progenitors than its Anglo-Saxon counterparts.

The primary structural similarity between the Sutton Hoo and other Anglo-Saxon helmets lies in the presence of cheek guards, a feature shared by the Coppergate, Wollaston and Staffordshire helmets, yet generally missing from their Scandinavian counterparts. The construction of the Sutton Hoo helmet is otherwise largely distinguished from all other Anglo-Saxon examples. Its cap is unique in having been raised from a single piece of iron. The caps of the other helmets were each composed of at least eight pieces. On the iron Coppergate, Shorwell and Wollaston helmets, a brow band was joined by a nose-to-nape band, two lateral bands, and four infill plates, while the Benty Grange helmet was constructed from both iron and horn.

A brow band was joined both by nose-to-nape and ear-to-ear bands and by four strips subdividing the resultant quadrants into eighths. Eight pieces of horn infilled the eight open spaces, with the eight joins each covered by an additional strip of horn. The Sutton Hoo helmet is the only known Anglo-Saxon helmet to have either a face mask or a fixed neck guard; the Coppergate and Benty Grange helmets, the only others to have any surviving form of neck protection, (Note: The Wollaston helmet, which was designed similarly to the Coppergate helmet, may have originally had some form of neck protection. Ploughing of the field in which it was buried, however, destroyed much of the helmet, including most of the dexter side. "The rear edge of the helmet's brow band is almost entirely lost through ploughing but the short section that did survive, when x-rayed, appeared to have part of at least 2 possible perforations on its damaged edge. The purpose of perforations in this position could only be to fix a neck guard of some type." The remaining section of the rear edge of the brow band is only 26 mm long, however, rendering "[t]he purpose, and on such a small length the existence, of the perforations . . . uncertain.") used camail and horn, respectively, and together with the Wollaston helmet protected the face by use of nose-to-nape bands elongated to form nasals.

The decorative similarities between the Sutton Hoo helmet and its Anglo-Saxon contemporaries are peripheral, if not substantial. The helmets from Wollaston and Shorwell were designed for use rather than display; the latter was almost entirely utilitarian, while the former, "a sparsely decorated 'fighting helmet,'" contained only a boar crest and sets of incised lines along its bands as decoration. Its boar crest finds parallel with that atop the Benty Grange helmet, the eyes on which are made of garnets "set in gold sockets edged with filigree wire . . . and having hollow gold shanks . . . which were sunk into a hole" in the head.

Though superficially similar to the garnets and wire inlays on the Sutton Hoo helmet, the techniques employed to combine garnet, gold and filigree work are of a higher complexity more indicative of Germanic work. A helmet sharing more distinct similarities with the Sutton Hoo example is the one from Coppergate. It features a crest and eyebrows, both hatched in a manner that may reflect "reminiscences or imitations of actual wire inlays" akin to those on the Sutton Hoo helmet. The eyebrows and crests on both helmets further terminate in animal heads, though in a less intricate manner on the Coppergate helmet, where they take a more two-dimensional form. These similarities are likely indicative of "a set of traditional decorative motifs which are more or less stable over a long period of time," rather than of a significant relationship between the two helmets.

Compared with the "almost austere brass against iron of the Coppergate helmet," the Sutton Hoo helmet, covered in tinned pressblech designs and further adorned with garnets, gilding, and inlaid silver wires, radiates "a rich polychromatic effect." Its appearance is substantially more similar to the Staffordshire helmet, which, while still undergoing conservation, has "a pair of cheek pieces cast with intricate gilded interlaced designs along with a possible gold crest and associated terminals." Like the Sutton Hoo helmet it was covered in pressblech foils, including a horseman and warrior motif so similar to design 3 as to have been initially taken for the same design.

==== Scandinavian ====
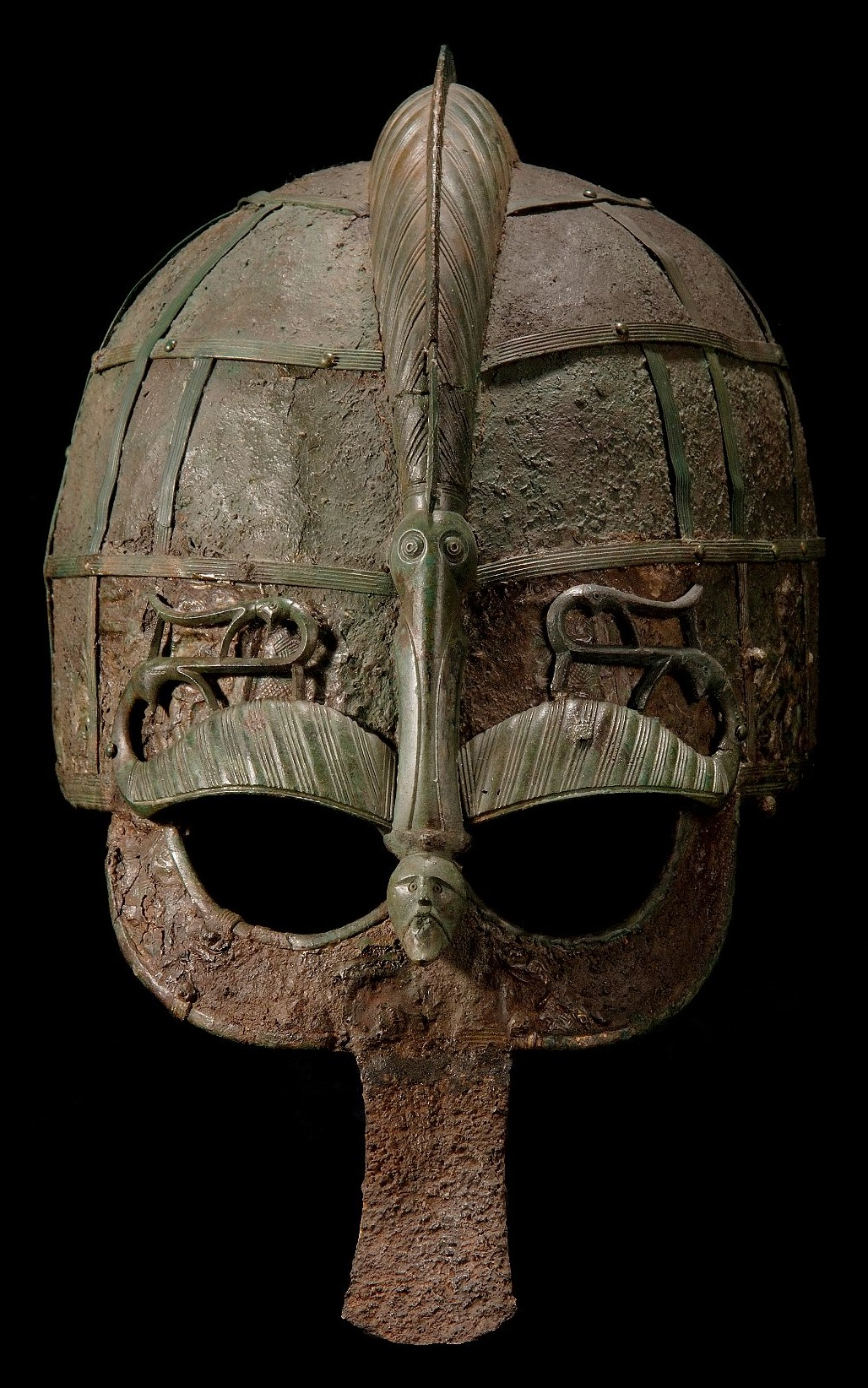
Vendel 1

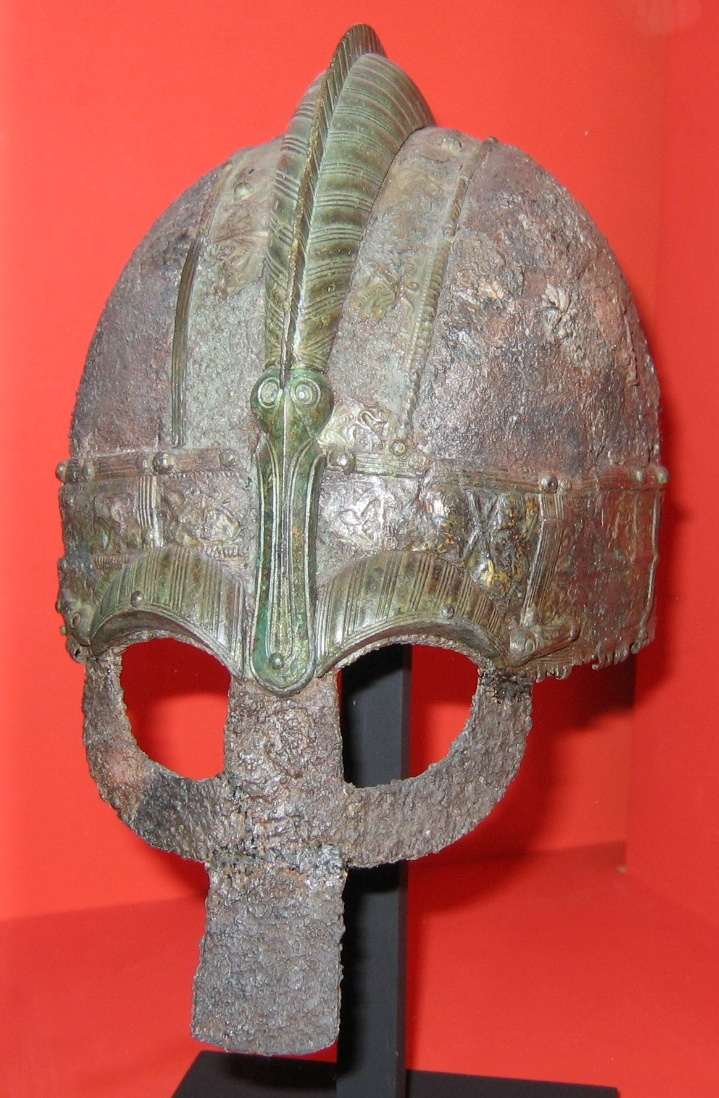
Vendel 12

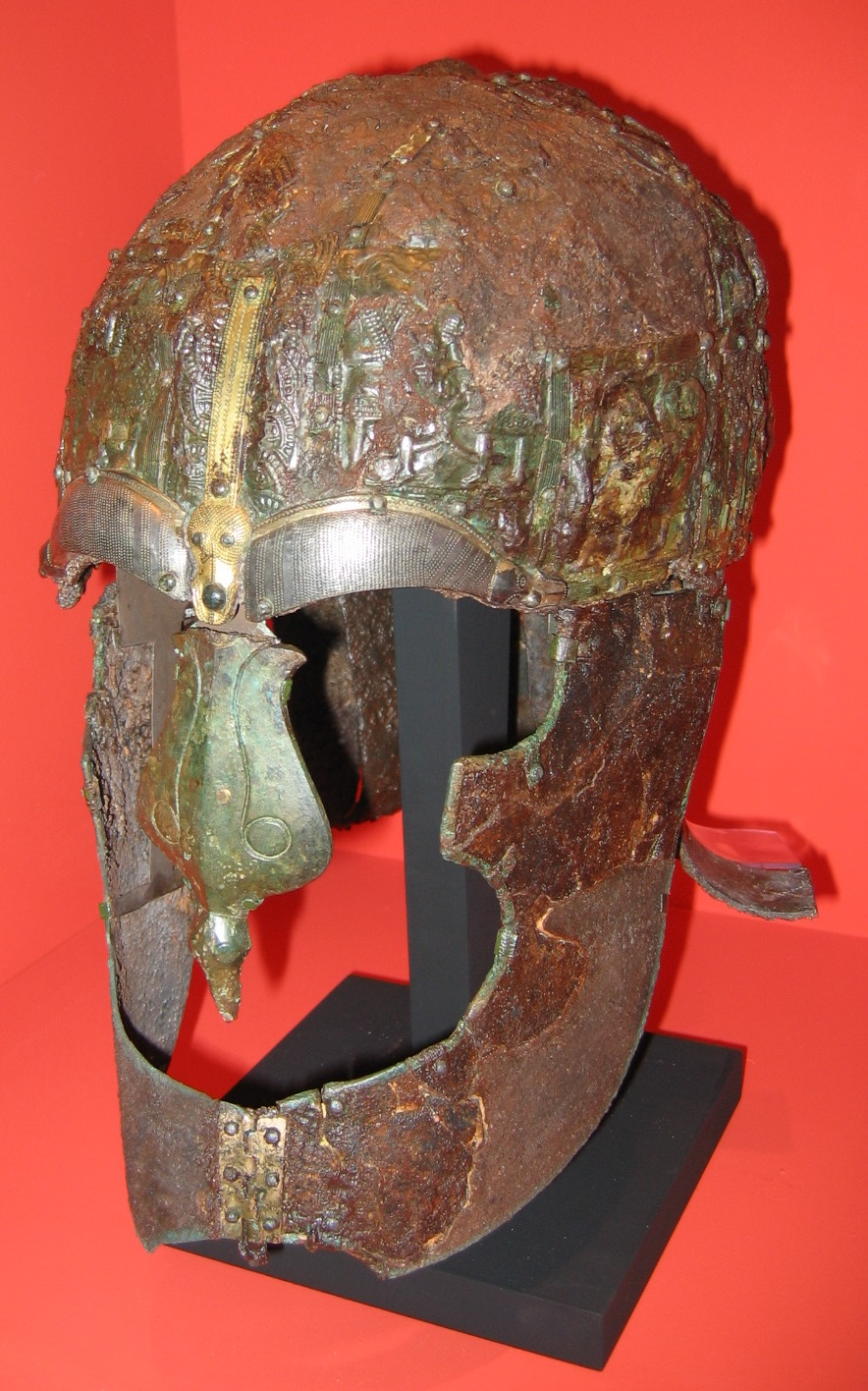
Vendel 14

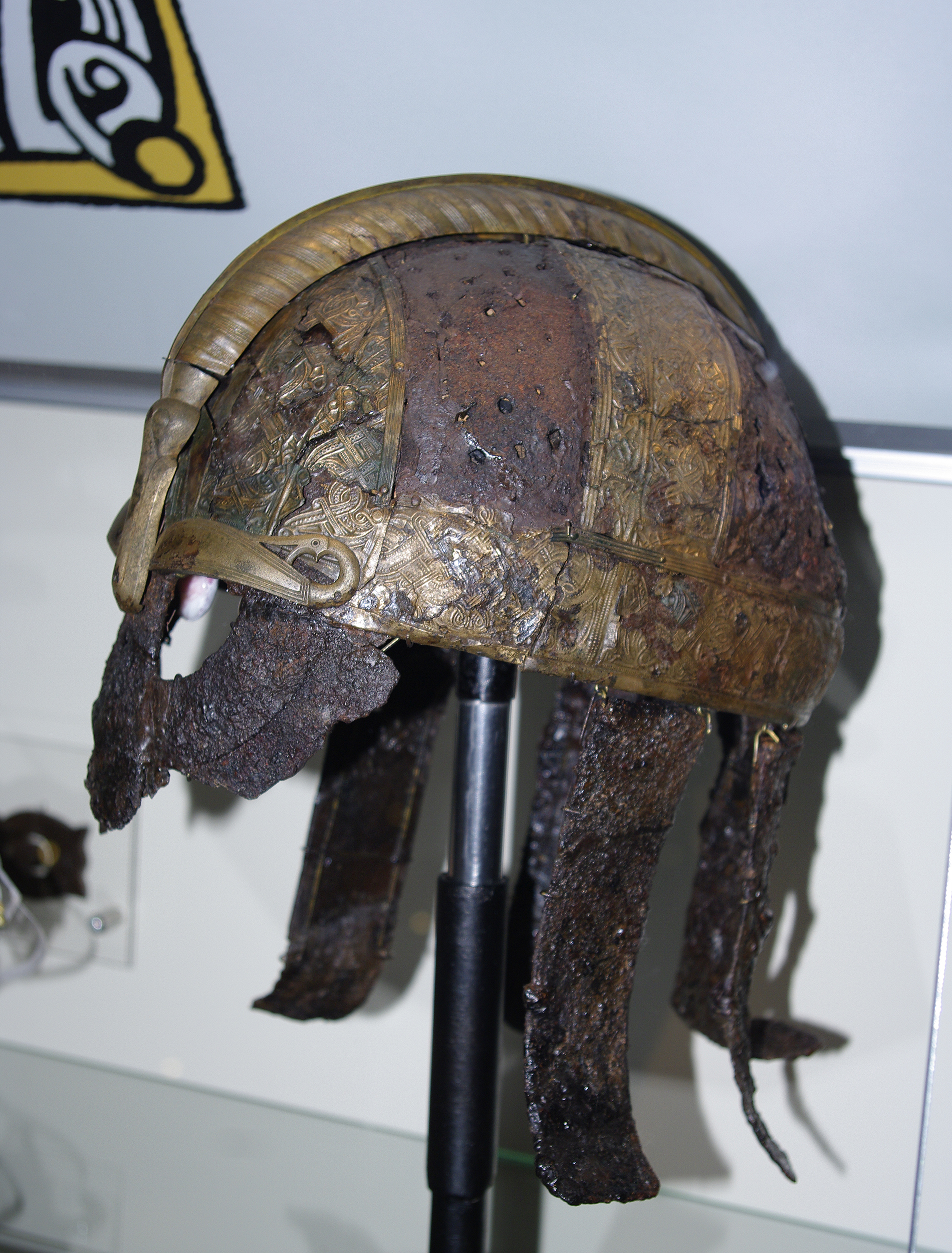
Valsgärde 5

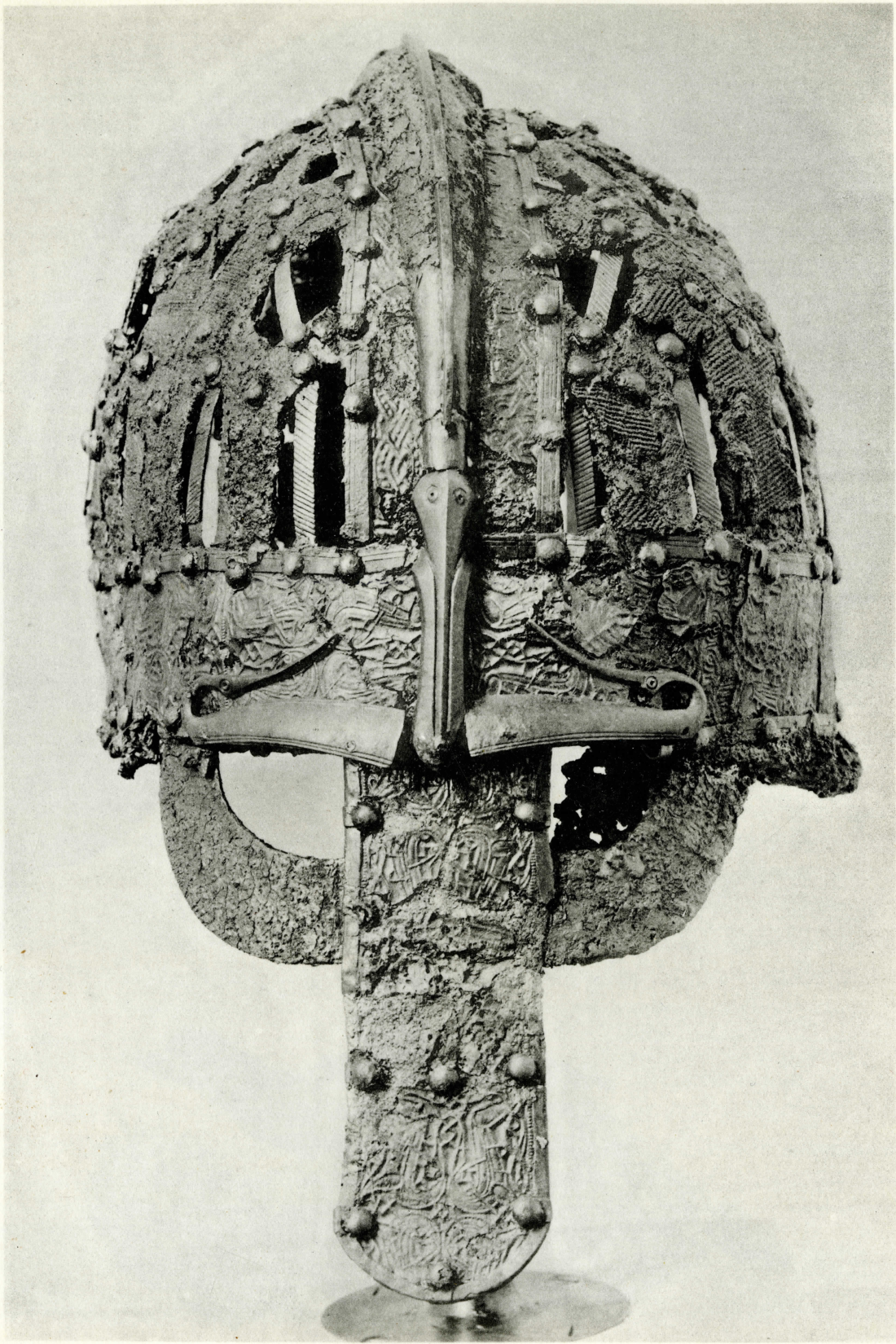
Valsgärde 6

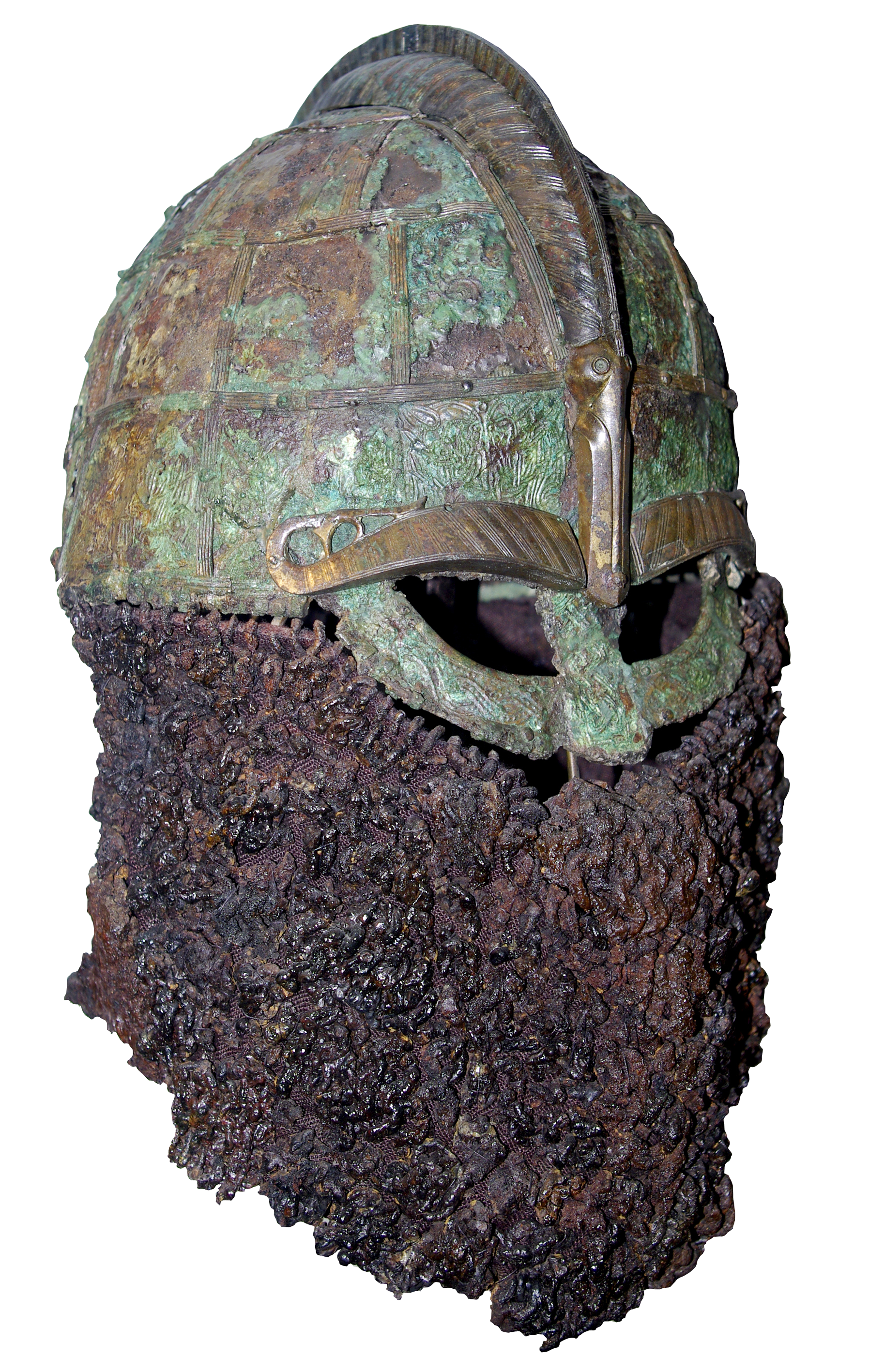
Valsgärde 8

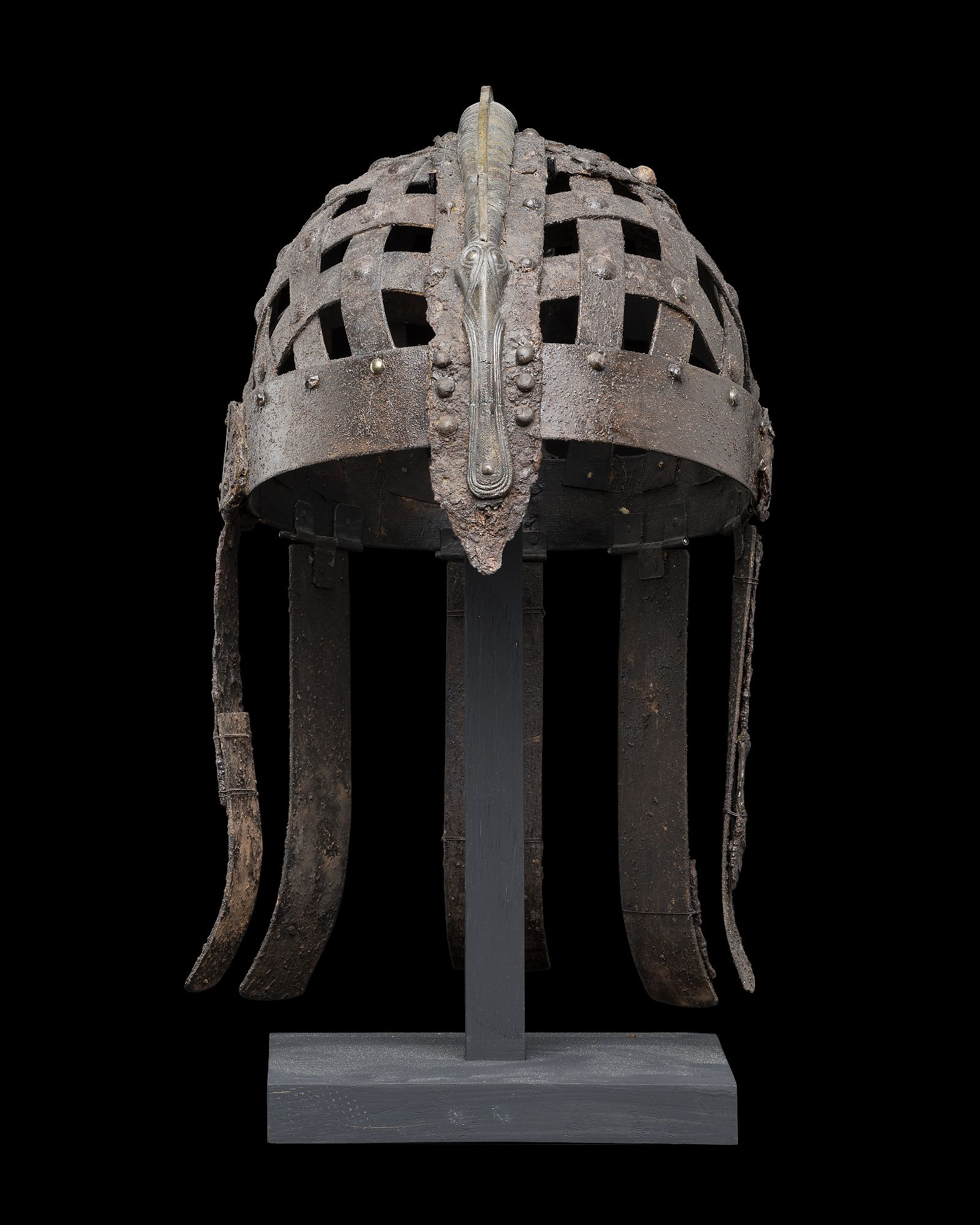
Ultuna

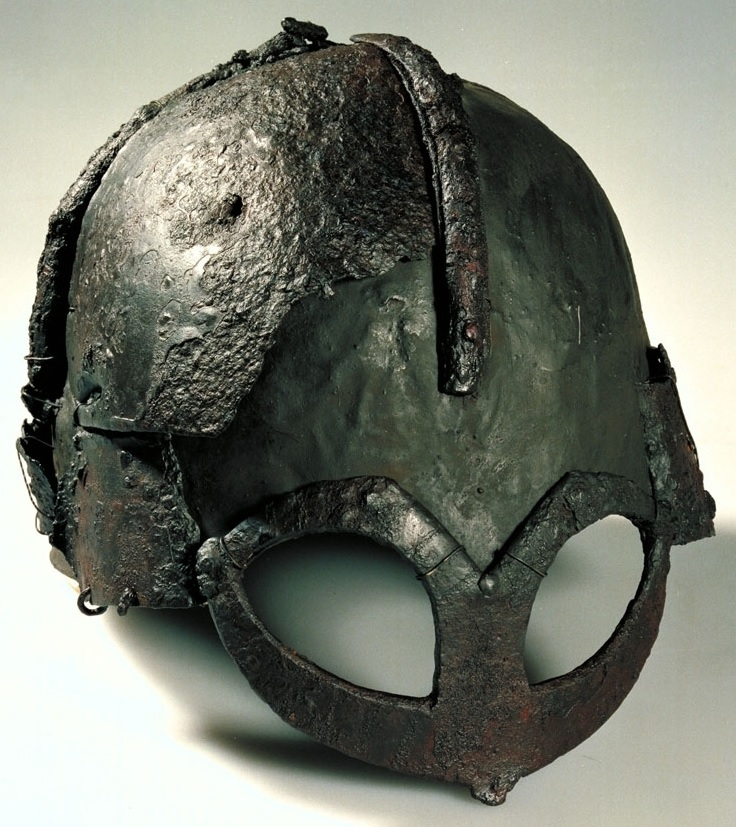
Gjermundbu

Significant differences in the construction of the Sutton Hoo and Scandinavian helmets belie significant similarities in their designs. The Scandinavian helmets that are capable of restoration were constructed more simply than the Sutton Hoo helmet. None has a face mask, solid neck guard, or cap made from one piece of metal, and only two have distinct cheek guards. The neck guards "seem without exception to have [been] either iron strips or protective mail curtains." The helmets from Ultuna, Vendel 14 and Valsgärde 5 all used iron strips as neck protection; five strips hung from the rear of the Vendel 14 and Valsgärde 5 brow bands, and though only two strips survive from the Ultuna helmet, others would have hung alongside them.

Camail was used on the remaining helmets, from Valsgärde 6, 7 and 8, and from Vendel 1 and 12. Fragmentary remains from Vendel 10 and 11, and from Solberga, likewise suggest camail. In terms of cheek protection, only two helmets had something other than continuations of the camail or iron strips used to protect the neck. The Vendel 14 helmet had cheek guards, but of "a differing version well forward on the face" of those on the Sutton Hoo helmet. Though not fully reconstructable, fragments from the Broe helmet suggest a configuration similar to those on the Vendel 14 helmet. Finally, the widely varying caps on each Scandinavian helmet all share one feature: None is similar to the cap on the Sutton Hoo helmet.

The basic form of the helmets from Vendel, Valsgärde, Ultuna and Broe all started with a brow band and nose-to-nape band. The Ultuna helmet had its sides filled in with latticed iron strips, while each side on the Valsgärde 8 helmet was filled in with six parallel strips running from the brow band to the nose-to-nape brand. The remaining four helmets—excepting those from Vendel 1 and 10, and Broe, which are too fragmentary to determine their exact construction—all employed two lateral bands and sectional infills.

The Vendel 14 helmet had eight infill plates, one rectangular and one triangular per quadrant; that from Valsgärde 7 helmet used four infill plates, one for each quadrant; the one from Valsgärde 6 also used identical infills for each quadrant, but with "elaborate" Y-shaped iron strips creating a latticed effect; and the Valsgärde 5 example filled in the back two quadrants with latticed iron strips, and the front two quadrants each with a rectangular section of lattice work and a triangular plate.

The decorative and iconographic similarities between the Sutton Hoo and Scandinavian helmets are remarkable; they are so pronounced as to have helped in the reconstruction of the Sutton Hoo helmet's own imagery, and to have fostered the idea that the helmet was made in Sweden, not Anglo-Saxon England. Its ornate crest and eyebrows are parallelled by the Scandinavian designs, some of which replicate or imitate its silver wire inlays; garnets adorn the helmets from Sutton Hoo and Valsgärde 7; and the pressblech designs covering the Sutton Hoo and Scandinavian helmets are both ubiquitous and iconographically intertwined. Although the Anglo-Saxon and Scandinavian helmets almost universally have crests, hence their general classification as "crested helmets," the wire inlays in the Sutton Hoo crest find their closest parallel in the "Vendel-type helmet-crests in which such wire-inlay patterns are imitated in casting or engraving."

Thus the crests from the Vendel 1 and 12 helmets both have chevrons mimicking the Sutton Hoo inlays, as does the Ultuna helmet and all those from Valsgärde—as well as fragments from Vendel 11 and from central Sweden. The eyebrows of Scandinavian helmets are yet more closely linked, for those on the Broe helmet are inlaid with silver wires, while the Lokrume helmet fragment is either inlaid or overlaid with silver.

Even those eyebrows without silver tend to be ornate. The Valsgärde 8, Vendel 1 and Vendel 10 eyebrows have chevrons following the same pattern as their crests, and though it lacks such an elaborate crest, the Vendel 14 helmet likewise has sets of parallel lines engraved longitudinally into the eyebrows; the lone eyebrow found at Hellvi is similarly decorated. Those that lack chevrons—singular finds from Uppåkra and Gevninge in addition to the helmets from Valsgärde 5, 6, and 7—are still highly decorated, with the garnet-encrusted Valsgärde 7 eyebrows being the only known parallel to those from Sutton Hoo.

In all these decorative respects, two Scandinavian helmets, from Valsgärde 7 and Gamla Uppsala, are uniquely similar to the Sutton Hoo example. The Valsgärde 7 crest has a "cast chevron ornament"; the helmet "is 'jeweled', like the Sutton Hoo helmet, but showing a greater use of garnets"; and it contains figural and interlace pressblech patterns, including versions of the two figural designs used on the Sutton Hoo helmet. Unlike on the Sutton Hoo helmet, the Valsgärde 7 rider and fallen warrior design was made with two dies, so that those on both dexter and sinister sides are seen moving towards the front, and they contain some "differing and additional elements."

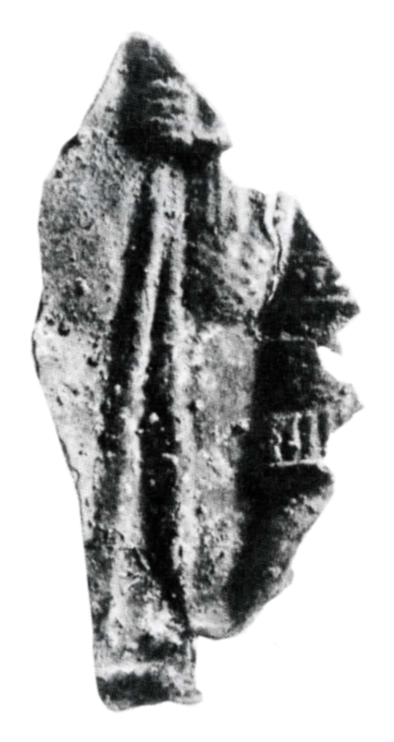
Gamla Uppsala fragment

The Valsgärde 7 version of the dancing warriors design, however, contains "only [one] major iconographic difference," the absence of two crossed spears behind the two men. The scenes are so similar that it was only with the Valsgärde 7 design in hand that the Sutton Hoo design could be reconstructed. The Gamla Uppsala version of this scene is even more similar. It was at first thought to have been struck from the same die, and required precise measurement of the original fragments to prove otherwise. Though the angles of the forearms and between the spears are slightly different, the Gamla Uppsala fragment nonetheless provides "the closest possible parallel" to the Sutton Hoo design.

Taken as a whole, the Valsgärde 7 helmet serves "better than any of the other helmets of its type to make explicit the East Scandinavian context of the Sutton Hoo helmet." Its differences, perhaps, are explained by the fact that it was in the grave of a "yeoman-farmer," not royalty. "Royal graves strictly contemporary with [it] have not yet been excavated in Sweden, but no doubt the helmets and shields such graves contained would be nearer in quality to the examples from Sutton Hoo." It is for this reason that the Gamla Uppsala fragment is particularly interesting; coming from a Swedish royal cremation and with "the dies seemingly cut by the same hand," the helmet may originally have been similar to the Sutton Hoo helmet.

==== Roman ====
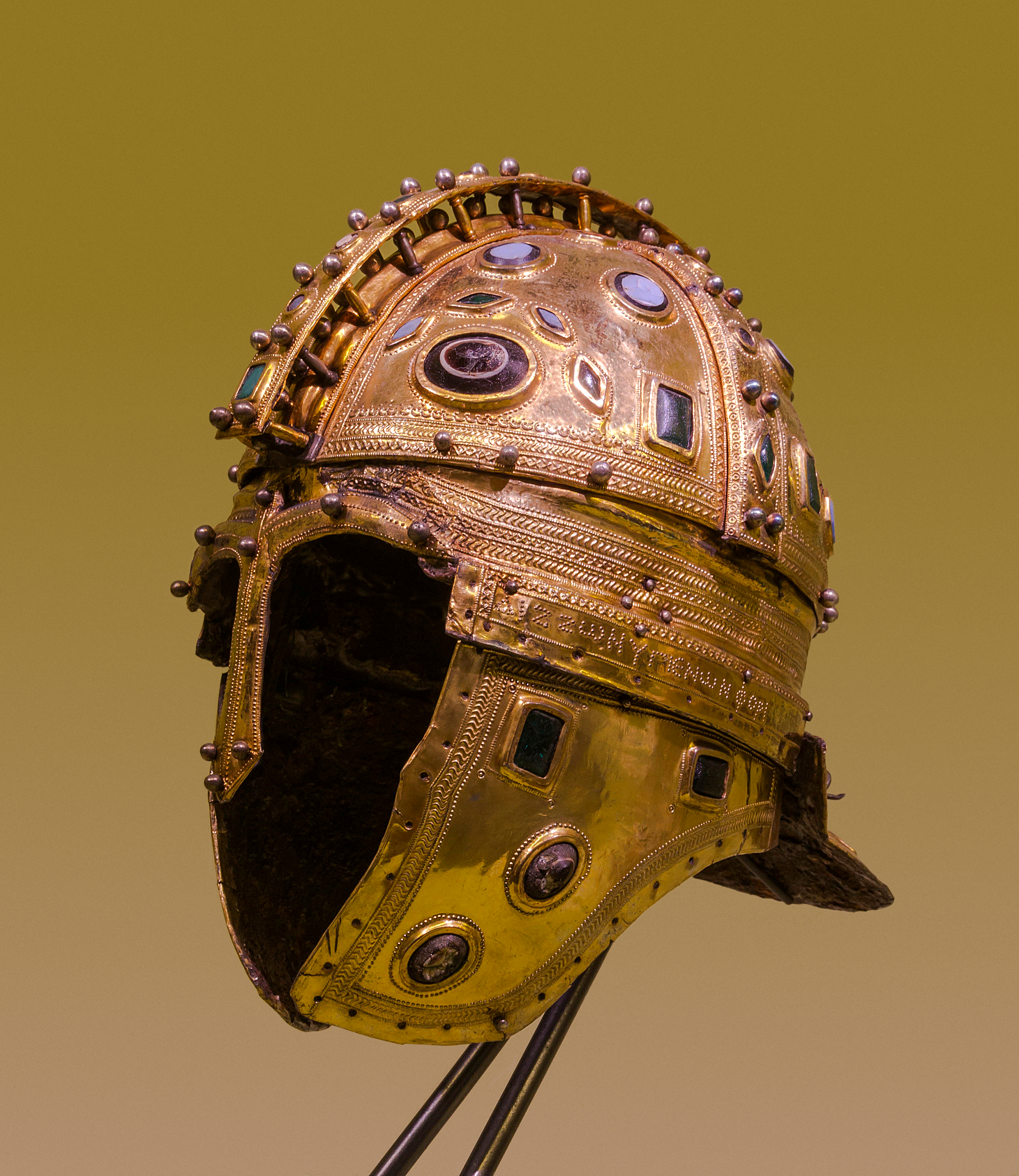
Berkasovo 1

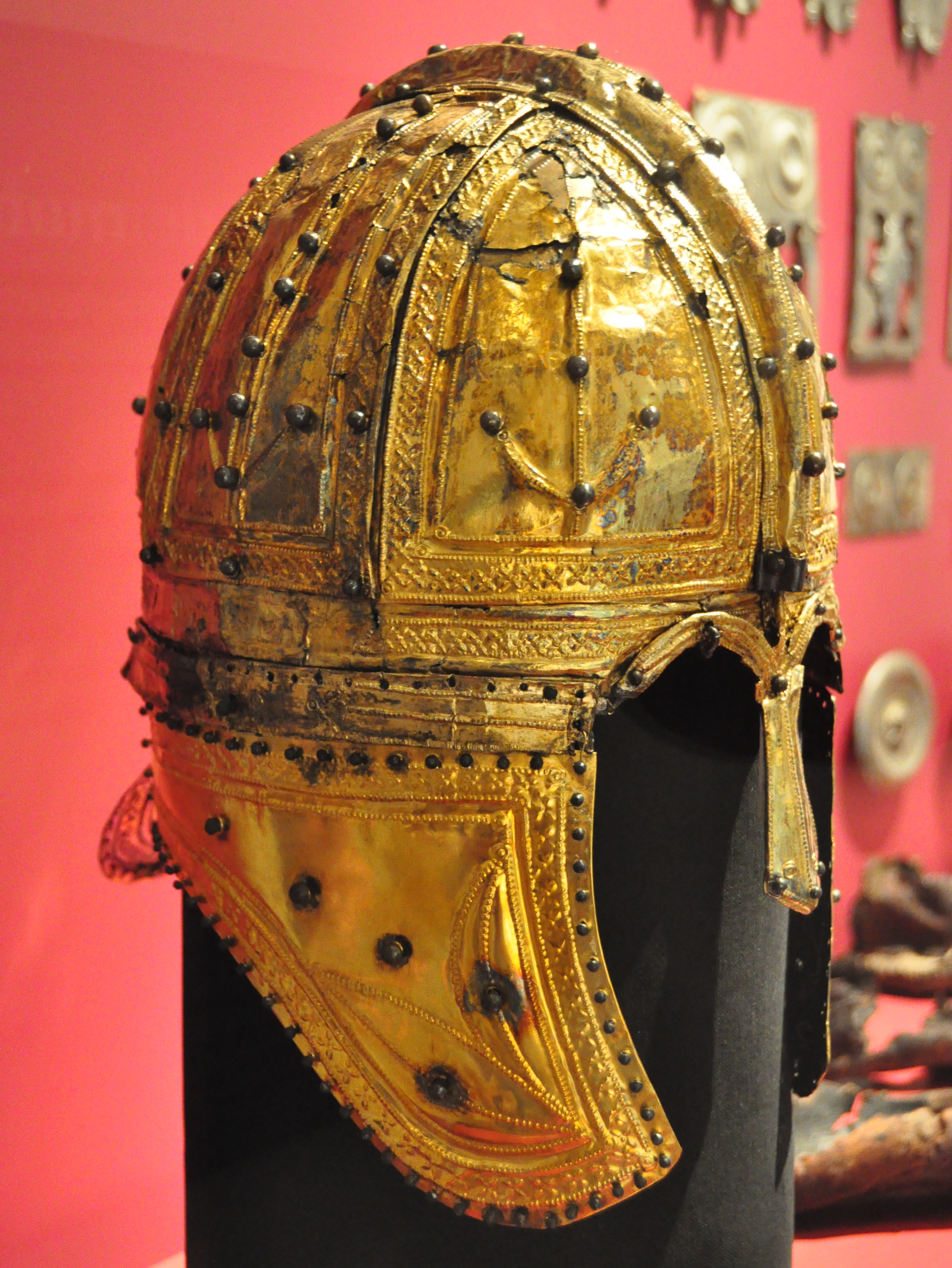
Deurne

Emesa

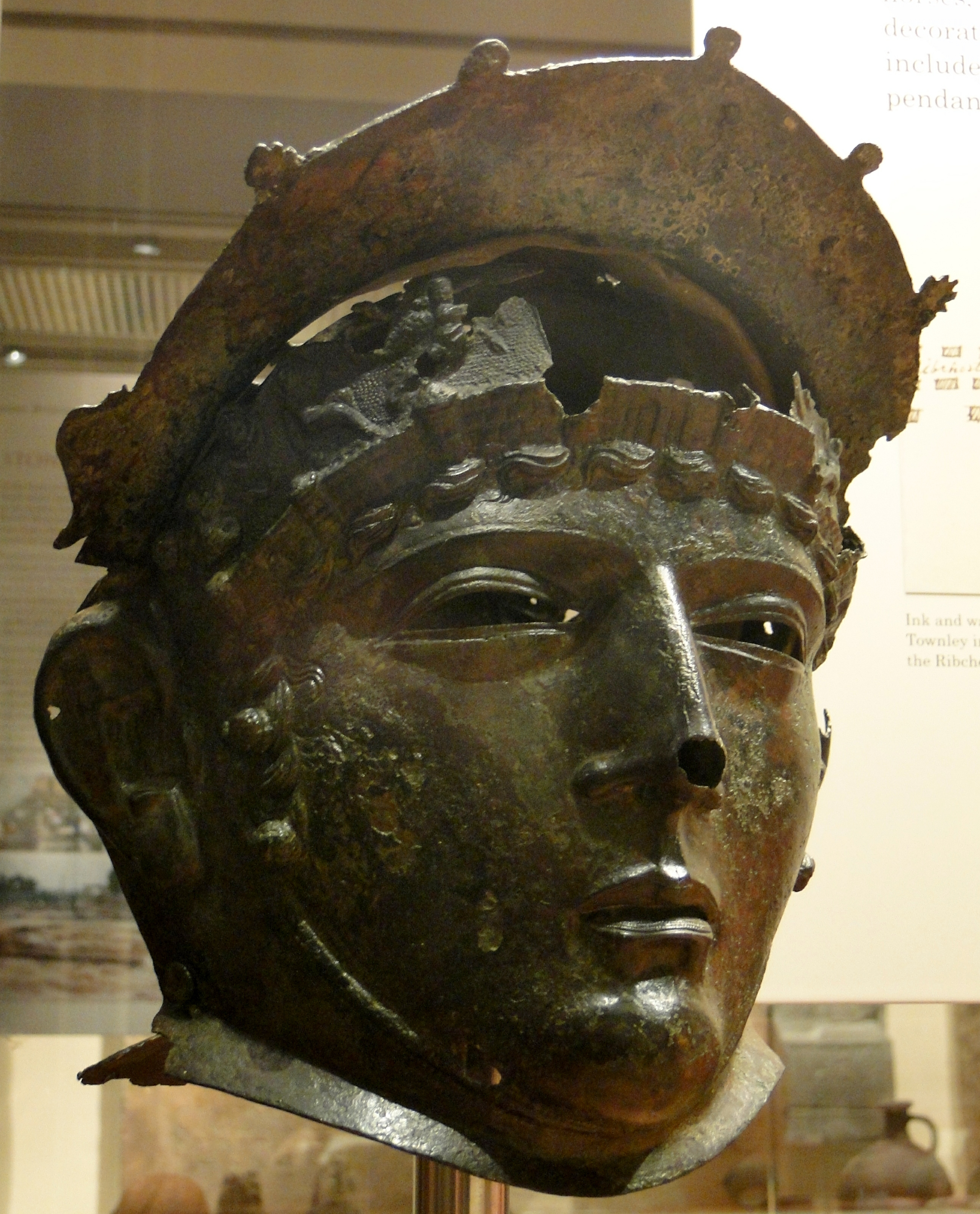
Ribchester

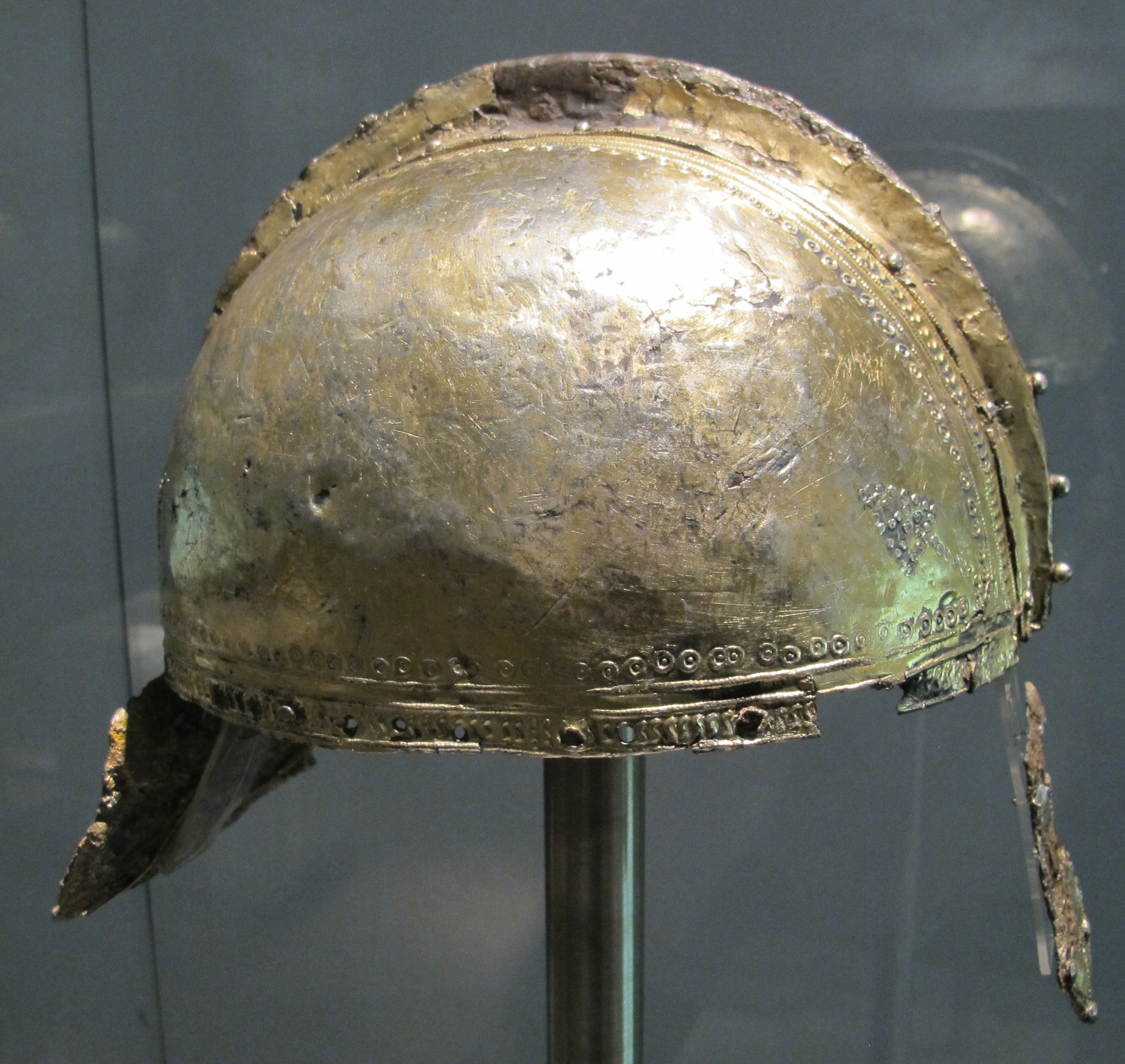
Augsburg-Pfersee

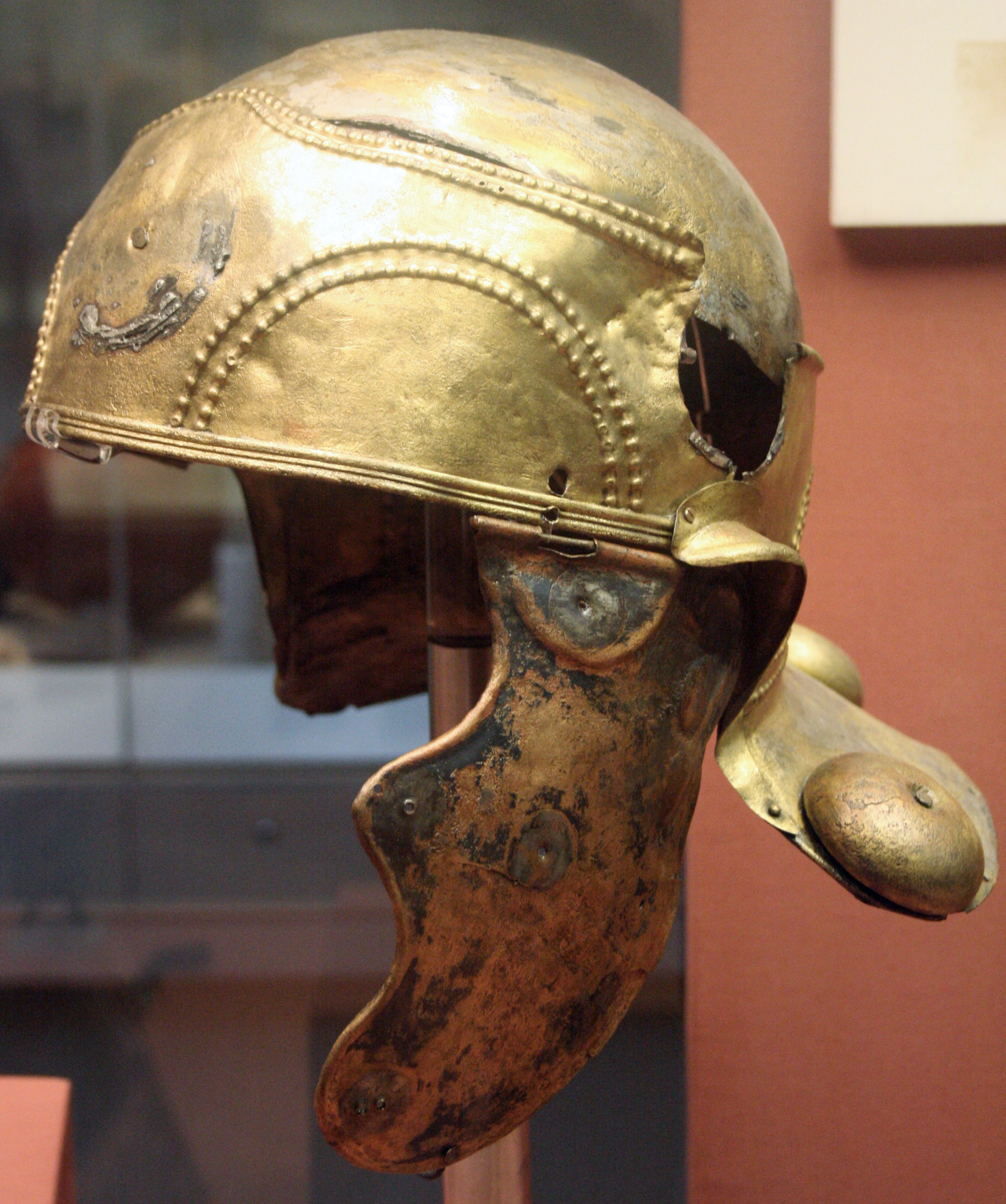
Witcham Gravel

Whatever its Anglo-Saxon or Scandinavian origins, the Sutton Hoo helmet is descended from the Roman helmets of the fourth and fifth century termed 'ridge helmets'. Its construction—featuring a distinctive crest, solid cap and neck and cheek guards, face mask, and leather lining—bears clear similarities to these earlier helmets. Numerous examples have a crest similar to that on the Sutton Hoo helmet, such as those from Deurne, Concești, Augsburg-Pfersee, and Augst, and the Berkasovo 1 and 2 and Intercisa 2 and 4 helmets. Meanwhile, the one-piece cap underneath, unique in this respect among the Anglo-Saxon and Scandinavian helmets, represents the end of a Greek and Roman technique.

Primarily used in first and second century helmets of the early Roman Empire before being replaced by helmets with a bipartite construction—hence the role of the crest in holding the two halves together—the practice is thought to have finally been forgotten around 500 AD. The solid iron cheek guards of the Sutton Hoo helmet, likewise, derive from the Constantinian style, and is marked by cutouts towards the back. The current reconstruction partly assumes the Roman influence of the cheek guards; Roman practice reinforced the belief that leather hinges were employed, while the sinister and dexter cheek guards were swapped after an expert on arms and armour suggested that the cutouts should be at the back. The neck guard similarly assumes leather hinges, (Note: In contrast to the Constantinian group, however, the cheek and neck guards on the Sutton Hoo helmet were affixed directly to the bowl. Late Roman helmets tended to have an iron band along the bottom of the cap to which the lower pieces were attached, as is seen on the Duerne, Augsburg-Pfersee, and Berkasovo 1 and 2 helmets.) and with its solid iron construction—like the one-piece cap, unique among Anglo-Saxon and Scandinavian helmets—is even more closely aligned with the Roman examples, if longer than was typical.

The Witcham Gravel helmet from the first century AD has such a broad and deep neck guard, and solid projecting guards are found on the Deurne and Berkasovo 2 helmets. Another feature of the Sutton Hoo helmet unparalleled by its contemporaries—its face mask—is matched by Roman examples. Among others the Ribchester helmet from the turn of the first century AD, and the Emesa helmet from the early first century AD, (Note: The Emesa helmet was also restored by Herbert Maryon, who carried out the first reconstruction of the Sutton Hoo helmet. An account of the restoration was published by H. J. Plenderleith in 1956.) each include an anthropomorphic face mask; the latter is more similar to the Sutton Hoo helmet, being affixed to the cap by a single hinge rather than entirely surrounding the face. Finally, the suggestion of a leather lining in the Sutton Hoo helmet, largely unsupported by positive evidence other than the odd texture of the interior of the helmet, gained further traction by the prevalence of similar linings in late Roman helmets. (Note: Indeed, H. Russell Robinson, an expert on Roman armour who worked at the Royal Armouries and helped with its replica of the Sutton Hoo helmet, was the one who suggested the leather lining used in the replica.)

Several of the decorative aspects of the Sutton Hoo helmet, particularly its white appearance, inlaid garnets, and prominent rivets, also derive from Roman practice. Its tinned surface compares with the Berkasovo 1 and 2 helmets and those from Concești, Augsburg-Pfersee, and Deurne. The Berkasovo 1 and Budapest helmets are further adorned with precious or semi-precious stones, a possible origin for the garnets on the Sutton Hoo and Valsgärde 7 helmets. Finally, the prominent rivets seen on some of the crested helmets, such as those from Valsgärde 8 and Sutton Hoo, may have been inspired by the similar decorative effect achieved by the rivets on Roman helmets like the Berkasovo 2 and Duerne examples.

=== Beowulf ===
Understandings of the Sutton Hoo ship-burial and Beowulf have been intertwined ever since the 1939 discovery of the former. "By the late 1950s, Beowulf and Sutton Hoo were so inseparable that, in study after study, the appearance of one inevitably and automatically evoked the other. If Beowulf came on stage first, Sutton Hoo was swiftly brought in to illustrate how closely seventh-century reality resembled what the poet depicted; if Sutton Hoo performed first, Beowulf followed close behind to give voice to the former's dumb evidence." Although "each monument sheds light on the other," the connection between the two "has almost certainly been made too specific."

Yet "[h]elmets are described in greater detail than any other item of war-equipment in the poem," and some specific connections can be drawn. The boar imagery, crest and visor all find parallels in Beowulf, as does the helmet's gleaming white and jewelled appearance. Though the Sutton Hoo helmet cannot be said to fully mirror any one helmet in Beowulf, the many isolated similarities help ensure that "despite the limited archaeological evidence no feature of the poetic descriptions is inexplicable and without archaeological parallel."

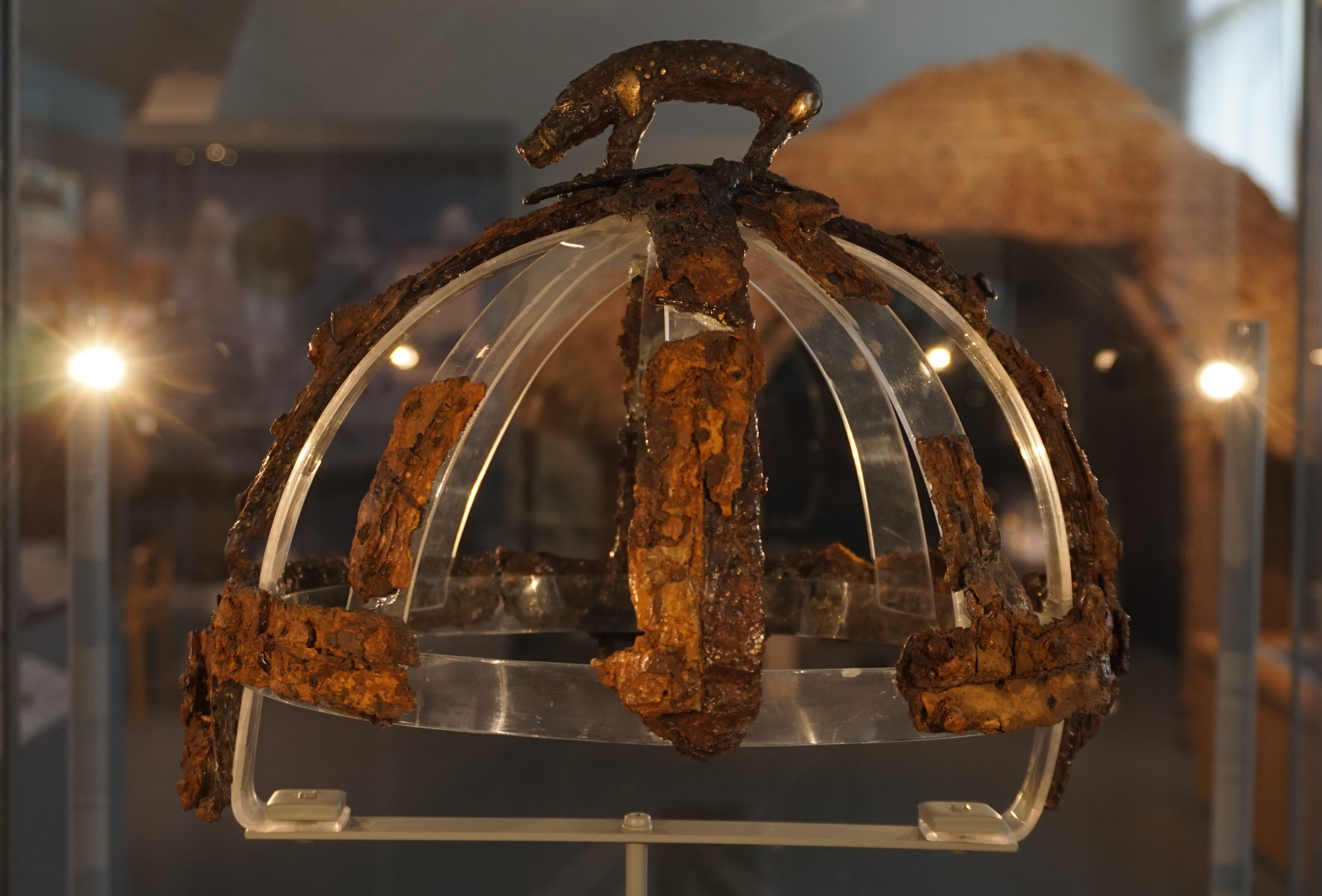
The Benty Grange helmet exhibits the other style of boar motif mentioned in Beowulf

Helmets with boar motifs are mentioned five times in Beowulf, and fall into two categories: those with freestanding boars and those without. As Beowulf and his fourteen men disembark their ship and are led to see King Hrothgar, they leave the boat anchored in the water:

Gewiton him þa feran, flota stille bad,
seomode on sale sidfæþmed scip,
oa ancre fæst. Eoforlic scionon
ofer hleorbergan gehroden golde,
fah ond fyrheard, ferhwearde heold
guþmod grimmon.

Translation:

So they went on their way. The ship rode the water,
broad-beamed, bound by its hawser
and anchored fast. Boar-shapes flashed
above their cheek-guards, the brightly forged
work of goldsmiths, watching over
those stern-faced men.

Such boar-shapes may have been like those on the Sutton Hoo helmet, terminating at the ends of the eyebrows and looking out over the cheek guards. Beowulf himself dons a helmet "set around with boar images" (besette swin-licum) before his fight with Grendel's mother; further described as "the white helmet . . . enhanced by treasure" (ac se hwita helm . . . since geweorðad), a similar description could have been applied to the tinned Sutton Hoo example. (The two helmets would not have been identical, however; Beowulf's was further described as "encircled in lordly links"—befongen frea-wrasnum—a possible reference to the type of chain mail on the Valsgärde 6 and 8 helmets that provided neck and face protection.)

The other style of boar adornment, mentioned three times in the poem, appears to refer to helmets with a freestanding boar atop the crest. When Hrothgar laments the death of his close friend Æschere, he recalls how Æschere was "my right hand man when the ranks clashed and our boar-crests had to take a battering in the line of action." These crests were probably more similar to those on the Benty Grange and Wollaston helmets, a detached boar found in Guilden Morden, and those seen in contemporary imagery on the Vendel 1 and Valsgärde 7 helmets and on the Torslunda plates.

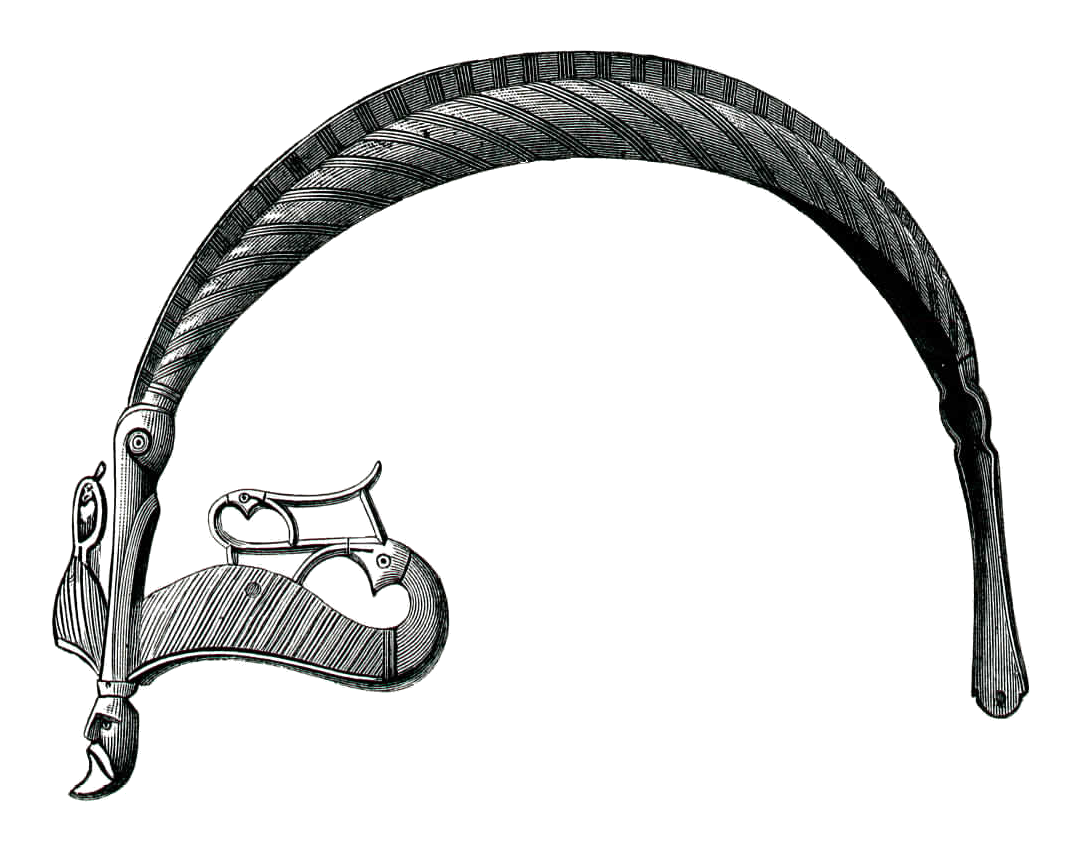
The crest of the Vendel 1 helmet contains "reminiscences or imitations of actual wire inlays," the wirum bewunden found on the helmets of Beowulf and Sutton Hoo.

Alongside the boar imagery on the eyebrows, the silver inlays of the crest on the Sutton Hoo helmet find linguistic support in Beowulf. The helmet presented to Beowulf as a "victory gift" following his defeat of Grendel is described with identical features:

no he þære feohgyfte
for sceotendum scamigan ðorfte.
Ne gefrægn ic freondlicor feower madmas
golde gegyrede gummanna fela
in ealobence oðrum gesellan.
Ymb þæs helmes hrof heafodbeorge
wirum bewunden wala utan heold,
þæt him fela laf frecne ne meahton
scurheard sceþðan, þonne scyldfreca
ongean gramum gangan scolde.

Translation:

It was hardly a shame to be showered with such gifts
in front of the hall-troops. There haven't been many
moments, I am sure, when men exchanged
four such treasures at so friendly a sitting.
An embossed ridge, a band lapped with wire
arched over the helmet: head-protection
to keep the keen-ground cutting edge
from damaging it when danger threatened
and the man was battling behind his shield.

This portion of the poem was thought "probably corrupt" until the helmet was discovered, with the suggestion that "the scribe himself does not appear to have understood it"; the meaning of "the notorious wala," in particular, was only guessed at. (Note: In 1882, for instance, wala was defined as "some part of a helmet," with the particular lines in Beowulf only partially translated as "about the helm's top a 'wal' wire-girt guarded on the outside the head's defense (i.e. the helmet)." By 1916 it was termed a "rib, comb (of helmet)," and in 1922 it was said that "[t]he exact nature of a wala, which seems to be an ornamental as well as useful part of the helmet, is not known." This confusion led to incorrect or speculative translations of the relevant lines, such as (1837) "[a]bout the crest of the helm, the defense of the head, it held an amulet fastened without with wires"; (1855) "[a]round the helmet's roof, the head-guard, with wires bound round"; (1914) "[r]ound the crown of the helm, as guard for the head, without, ran a rib to which plates were made fast"; (1921) "[a]bout the roof of that helmet / his head's safety, With wires ywounden, / a wreath guarded without"; and, by J. R. R. Tolkien in 1926, "[r]ound the helmet's crown the wale wound about with wire kept guard without over the head." Despite the many mistranslations, a correct interpretation of the use of the word wala was theorized at least twice before the discovery of the Sutton Hoo helmet. With the Vendel 1 helmet, which had a crest with "reminiscences or imitations of actual wire inlays on earlier or richer helmets," as his inspiration, Knut Stjerna suggested in 1912 that the "helmet had a rib or comb running up to it to its whole height and down again at the back, and this must have been the part of the helmet which is spoken of as the walu." Elizabeth Martin-Clarke posed a similar idea during a 1945 lecture, stating that "probably here we may have a reference to a special part of the helmet also which resists the sword cut . . . well represented in the picture of a reconstructed helmet from Vendel [1].") The term is generally used in Old English to refer to a ridge of land, not the crest of a helmet; metaphorically termed wala in the poem, the crest is furthermore wirum bewunden, literally "wire bewound" (bound with wires). It therefore parallels the silver inlays along the crest of the Sutton Hoo helmet. Such a crest would, as described in Beowulf, provide protection from a falling sword. "A quick turn of the head as the blow fell would enable the wearer to take it across the 'comb' and avoid its falling parallel with the comb and splitting the cap."

The discovery has led many Old English dictionaries to define wala within the "immediate context" of Beowulf, including as a "ridge or comb inlaid with wires running on top of helmet from front to back," although doing so "iron[s] out the figurative language" intended in the poem. The specific meaning of the term as used within the poem is nevertheless explicated by the Sutton Hoo helmet, in turn "illustrat[ing] the intimacy of the relationship between the archaeological material in the Sutton Hoo grave and the Beowulf poem."

A final parallel between the Sutton Hoo helmet and those in Beowulf is the presence of face masks, a feature which makes the former unique among its Anglo-Saxon and East Scandinavian counterparts. The uniqueness may reflect that, as part of a royal burial, the helmet is "richer and of higher quality than any other helmet yet found." In Beowulf, "a poem about kings and nobles, in which the common people hardly appear," compounds such as "battle-mask" (beadogriman), "war-mask" (heregriman), "mask-helm" (grimhelmas), and "war-head" (wigheafolan) indicate the use of visored helmets. The term "war-head" is particularly apt for the anthropomorphic Sutton Hoo helmet. "[T]he word does indeed describe a helmet realistically. Wigheafola: complete head-covering, forehead, eyebrows, eye-holes, cheeks, nose, mouth, chin, even a moustache!"

== Discovery ==
The Sutton Hoo helmet in its fragmentary, unreconstructed state

The Sutton Hoo helmet was discovered over three days in July and August 1939, with only three weeks remaining in the excavation of the ship-burial. It was found in more than 500 pieces, which would prove to account for less than half of the original surface area. The discovery was recorded in the diary of C. W. Phillips as follows:

Friday, 28 July 1939: "The crushed remains of an iron helmet were found four feet [1.2 m] east of the shield boss on the north side of the central deposit. The remains consisted of many fragments of iron covered with embossed ornament of an interlace with which were also associated gold leaf, textiles, an anthropomorphic face-piece consisting of a nose, mouth, and moustache cast as a whole (bronze), and bronze zoomorphic mountings and enrichments."

Saturday, 29 July: "A few more fragments of the iron helmet came to light and were boxed with the rest found the day before."

Tuesday, 1 August: "The day was spent in clearing out the excavated stern part of the ship and preparing it for study. Before this a final glean and sift in the burial area had produced a few fragments which are probably to be associated with the helmet and the chain mail respectively."

The helmet fragments were neither photographed nor recorded in situ, leaving only their general location known.

Although the helmet is now considered to be one of the most important artefacts ever found on British soil, its shattered state caused it to go at first unnoticed. No photographs were taken of the fragments in situ, nor were their relative positions recorded, as the importance of the discovery had not yet been realised. (Note: In a list of thirteen "hard-learned lessons" for the excavation of any future ship-burial that were given in a 1973 lecture, Bruce-Mitford would start the list with "[y]ou cannot take too many photographs" and "[y]ou cannot use too much colour film.") The only contemporary record of the helmet's location was a circle on the excavation diagram marked "nucleus of helmet remains." When reconstruction of the helmet commenced years later, it would thus become "a jigsaw puzzle without any sort of picture on the lid of the box," not to mention a jigsaw puzzle missing half its pieces.

Overlooked at first, the helmet quickly gained notice. Even before all the fragments had been excavated, the Daily Mail spoke of "a gold helmet encrusted with precious stones." A few days later it would more accurately describe the helmet as having "elaborate interlaced ornaments in silver and gold leaf." Despite scant time to examine the fragments, they were termed "elaborate" and "magnificent"; "crushed and rotted" and "sadly broken" such that it "may never make such an imposing exhibit as it ought to do," it was nonetheless thought the helmet "may be one of the most exciting finds." The stag found in the burial—later placed atop the sceptre—was even thought at first to adorn the crest of the helmet.

=== Donation ===
Under the common law in effect at the time, gold and silver that had been hidden and later rediscovered, with the original ownership undetermined, was declared treasure trove, and thus the property of the crown. (Note: Treasure trove was abolished by, and replaced with, Treasure Act 1996.) As defined by William Blackstone in Commentaries on the Laws of England, treasure trove "is where any money or coin, gold, silver, plate, or bullion, is found hidden in the earth, or other private plate, the owner thereof being unknown; in which case the treasure belongs to the king: but if he that hid it be known, or afterwards found out, the owner and not the king is entitled to it. Also if it be found in the sea, or upon the earth, it doth not belong to the king, but the finder, if no owner appears. So that it seems it is the hiding, not the abandoning of it, that gives the king a property". Those who discovered such treasure were obliged to report their finds to a county coroner, after which an inquest would be held to determine the rightful owner.

Items with only marginal amounts of gold or silver, such as the Sutton Hoo helmet, were not eligible for treasure trove; instead, they became the property of the landowner, Edith Pretty, outright. An inquest for the remaining items, comprising 56 categories of objects, was held on 14 August 1939. The 14-person jury found that the objects did not constitute treasure trove, and thus belonged to Pretty; the dispositive issue was that, as the coroner put it, given "the labour and publicity involved in dragging the ship up to the trench", presumably accompanied by "attendant publicity and subsequent feasting", it was "impossible to be of the opinion that these articles were buried or concealed secretly". (Note: If not for Pretty's subsequent bequest of the artefacts, the crown may have sought review of the jury's verdict by the High Court of Justice. Such a review may have focused on a gap in Blackstone's definition of treasure trove, in that grave goods are not necessarily either hidden or abandoned; one who buries such an object, while having no intention to recover it, may nonetheless be thought to retain some ownership rights.) Within days, however, Pretty donated the entirety of the find to the British Museum. Even had the gold and silver objects been declared treasure trove, ownership of the remaining objects, including the helmet, would have remained with Pretty; donation was thus one of the sole vehicles by which the museum could have taken possession of the finds.

Excavations at Sutton Hoo came to an end on 24 August 1939, and all items were shipped out the following day. Nine days later, Britain declared war on Germany. The intervening time allowed for fragile and perishable objects to be tended to, and for the finds to be secured for safekeeping. Throughout World War II the Sutton Hoo artefacts, along with other treasures from the British Museum such as the Elgin Marbles, were stored in the tunnel connecting the Aldwych and Holborn tube stations. Only at the end of 1944 were preparations made to unpack, conserve and restore the finds from Sutton Hoo.

== First reconstruction ==
Profile view

The 1946 reconstruction

The helmet was first reconstructed by Herbert Maryon between 1945 and 1946. A retired professor of sculpture and an authority on early metalwork, Maryon was specially employed as a technical attaché at the British Museum on 11 November 1944. His job was to restore and conserve the finds from the Sutton Hoo ship-burial, including what Bruce-Mitford called "the real headaches – notably the crushed shield, helmet and drinking horns".

Maryon's work on the Sutton Hoo objects continued until 1950, of which six continuous months were spent reconstructing the helmet. This reached Maryon's workbench as a corroded mass of fragments, some friable and encrusted in sand, others hard and partially transformed into limonite. As Bruce-Mitford observed, the "task of restoration was thus reduced to a jigsaw puzzle without any sort of picture on the lid of the box," and, "as it proved, a great many of the pieces missing."

Maryon began by familiarising himself with the various fragments; he traced and detailed each one on a piece of stiff paper, and segregated them by decorations, distinctive markings, and thickness. After what he termed "a long while", Maryon turned to reconstruction. He adhered the adjoining pieces with Durofix, holding them together in a box of sand while the adhesive hardened. These were then placed on a human-sized head Maryon sculpted from plaster, with added layers to account for the lining that would have originally separated head from metal.

The fragments of the skull cap were initially stuck to the head with Plasticine, or, if thicker, placed into spaces cut into the head. Finally, strong white plaster was used to permanently affix the fragments, and, mixed with brown umber, fill in the gaps between pieces. Meanwhile, the fragments of the cheek guards, neck guard, and visor were placed onto shaped, plaster-covered wire mesh, then affixed with more plaster and joined to the cap.

Though visibly different from the current reconstruction, Bruce-Mitford wrote, "[m]uch of Maryon's work is valid. The general character of the helmet was made plain." The 1946 reconstruction identified the designs recognised today, and similarly arranged them in a panelled configuration. Both reconstructions composed the visor and neck guards with the same designs: the visor with the smaller interlace (design 5), the neck guard with a top row of the larger interlace (design 4) above two rows of the smaller interlace. The layout of the cheek guards is also similar in both reconstructions; the main differences are the added length provided by a third row in the second reconstruction, the replacement of a design 4 panel with the dancing warriors (design 1) in the middle row, and the switching of sides.

=== Reception and criticism ===
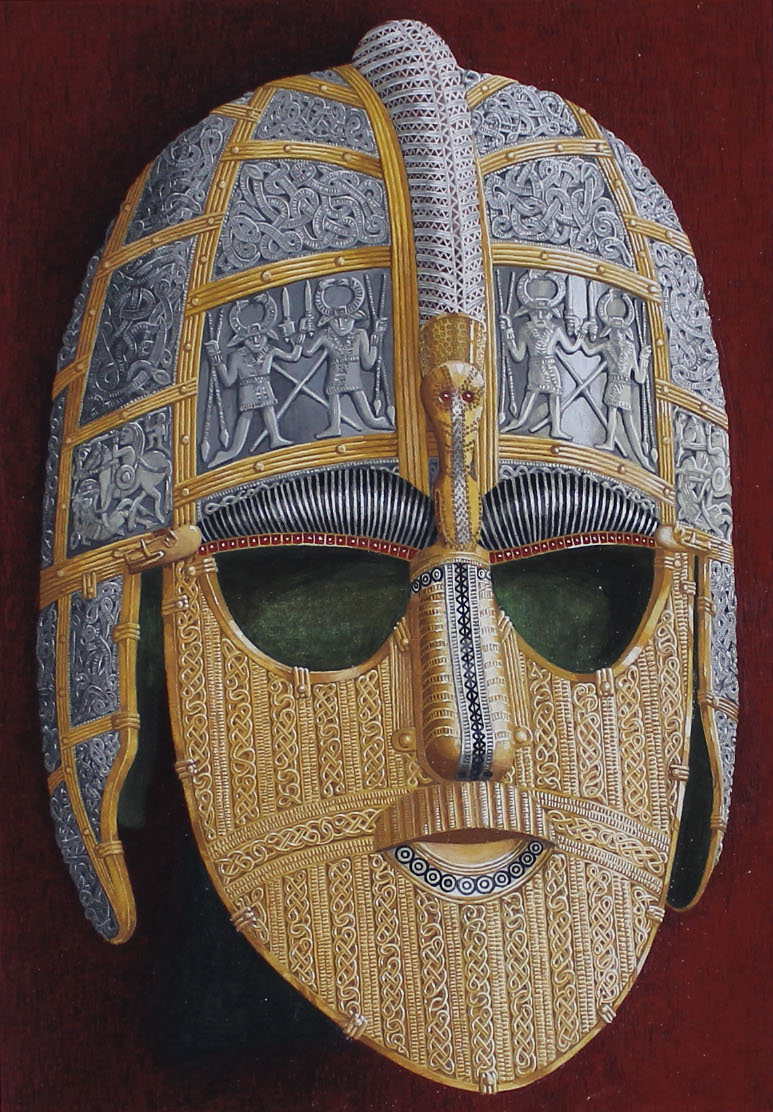
A 1966 illustration showing several modifications to the reconstruction

The first reconstruction of the Sutton Hoo helmet was met with worldwide acclaim and was both academically and culturally influential. It stayed on display for more than 20 years, during which time it became an iconic object of the Middle Ages. In 1951 the helmet was displayed at the Festival of Britain, where an exhibit on Sutton Hoo was curated by Rupert Bruce-Mitford. That same year Life dispatched a 25-year-old Larry Burrows to the British Museum, resulting in a full-page photograph of the helmet alongside a photograph of Maryon. In 1956, on the strength of his restorations, Maryon was appointed an Officer of the Order of the British Empire.

Images of the helmet made their way into television programmes, books, and newspapers, even as the second reconstruction was worked on. Though the lasting impact of the first reconstruction is as a first, reversible, attempt from which problems could be identified and solutions found, for two decades Maryon's reconstruction was an icon in its own right.

With the helmet on public display and as greater knowledge of contemporary helmets became available, the first reconstruction, Bruce-Mitford wrote, "was soon criticised, though not in print, by Swedish scholars and others." (Note: The only published criticism may have been that of Sune Lindqvist, who wrote that the reconstruction "needs revision in certain respects." Lindqvist's only specific criticism, however, was that the face mask was "set somewhat awry in the reconstruction." Bruce-Mitford was undoubtedly aware of Lindqvist's criticism when he wrote that the first reconstruction was not criticised in print, for he was the English translator of Lindqvist's article. He was thus likely referring to the more substantial criticisms of the reconstruction, such as its gaps in afforded protection, which indeed do not seem to have been published.) An underlying issue was the decision to arrange the fragments around the mould of an average man's head, possibly inadvertently predetermining the reconstruction's size. Particular criticisms also noted its exposed areas, and a neck guard that was fixed rather than movable.

Though envisioned by Maryon as similar to a "crash helmet of a motor cyclist" with padding of about 3/8 inch (9.5 mm) between head and helmet, its size allowed for little such cushioning; one with a larger head would have had difficulty just getting it on. The missing portion at the front of each cheek piece left the jaw exposed, there was a hole between eyebrows and nose, and the eye holes were large enough for a sword to pass through. Meanwhile, as noted early on by Sune Lindqvist, the projecting face mask seemed odd, and would have left the wearer's nose vulnerable to blows to the face.

An artistic reconstruction created in 1966 by the British Museum and the Archaeology Division of the Ordnance Survey, under the direction of C. W. Phillips, attempted to solve some of these problems, showing a larger cap, a straighter face mask, smaller eye openings, the terminal dragon heads at opposite ends, and the rearrangement of some of the pressblech panels. It too, however, came under criticism by archaeologists.

A final issue raised by Maryon's construction was the use of plaster to elongate the crest by approximately 4 1/2 inches (110 mm). The crest had largely survived its millennium of interment, perhaps given durability by the inlaid silver wires. The need to replace missing portions was thus questioned; it was thought that either the reconstructed crest was too long, or that original portions had been overlooked during the 1939 excavation. When the ship-burial was re-excavated in the 1960s, one of the objectives was thus to search for more fragments, the absence of which could be treated as evidence that the crest had originally been shorter.

=== Re-excavations at Sutton Hoo, 1965–70 ===
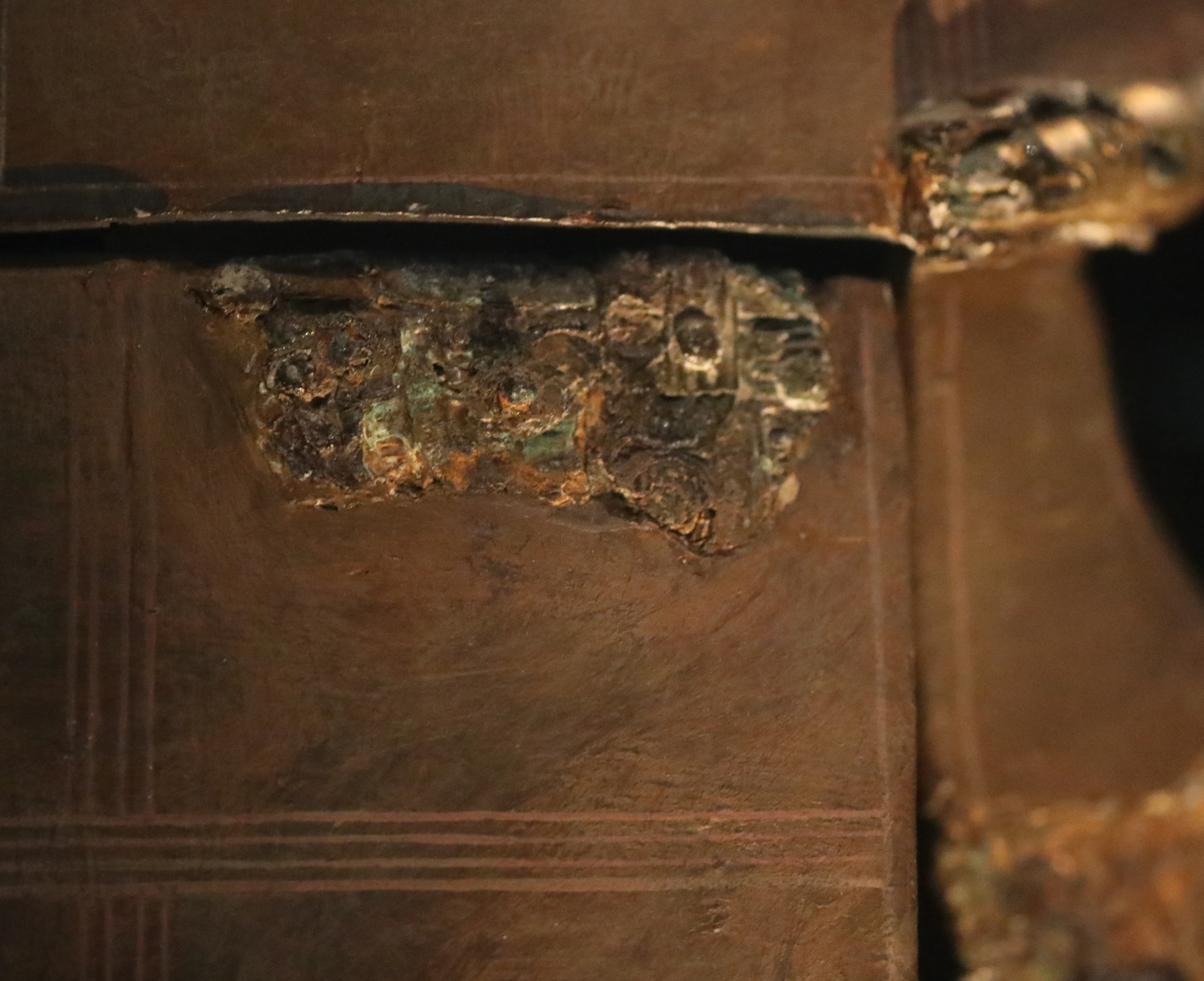
Discovered in 1967, the fragment on the left completed a hinge on the dexter cheek guard

Numerous questions were left unanswered by the 1939 excavation at Sutton Hoo, and in 1965 a second excavation began. Among other objectives were to survey the burial mound and its surrounding environment, to relocate the ship impression (from which a plaster cast was ultimately taken) and excavate underneath, and to search the strata from the 1939 dumps for any fragments that may have been originally missed. The first excavation had effectively been a rescue dig under the threat of impending war, creating the danger that fragments of objects might have been inadvertently discarded; a gold mount from the burial was already known to have nearly met that fate.

Additional fragments of the helmet could hopefully shed light on the unidentified third figural design, or buttress Maryon's belief that 4 inches (100 mm) of the crest were missing. To this end, the excavation sought "both positive and negative evidence." New crest fragments could go where Maryon had placed plaster, while their absence could be used to suggest that the crest on the first reconstruction was too long.

Four new helmet fragments were discovered during re-excavation. The three 1939 dumps were located during the 1967 season, and "almost at once" yielded "fragments of helmet and of the large hanging bowl ... as well as fragments of shield ornaments and a tine from the stag." The finds were so plentiful that a single three foot by one foot section of the first dump contained sixty cauldron fragments. The four pieces of the helmet came from the second dump, which contained only items from the ship's burial chamber. They included a hinge piece from the dexter cheek guard, a "surface flake" from the crest, a small piece of iron with fluted lines, and a small piece of iron edging showing part of the larger interlace design.

The most important helmet finds from the re-excavation at Sutton Hoo were the piece from cheek guard, and the lack of any substantial crest piece. The fragment of the cheek guard joined another found in 1939, together completing "a hinge plate for one of the moving parts of the helmet, which could not be done previously." Meanwhile, although a "surface flake" from the crest was discovered, its placement did not affect the overall length of the crest. The lack of significant crest finds instead "reinforce[d] scepticism of the long plaster insertions in the original reconstruction."

== Current reconstruction ==
The helmet while being assembled for the second time. A dragon head has been positioned facing upwards so as to create the image of a dragon in mid-flight.

The current reconstruction of the Sutton Hoo helmet was completed in 1971, following eighteen months of work by Nigel Williams. Williams had joined the British Museum in his teens after studying at the same Central School of Arts and Crafts as Maryon, yet in contrast to Maryon, who completed the first restoration in his 70s and "with the use of only one eye", Williams reconstructed the helmet while in his mid-20s.

In 1968, with problems evident in the first reconstruction that were left unresolved by the re-excavations at Sutton Hoo, the decision was made to reexamine the evidence. Following several months of deliberation, it was decided to disassemble the helmet and construct it anew. The cheek guards, face mask and neck guard were first removed from the helmet and x-rayed, revealing the wire mesh covered in plaster and overlaid by fragments.

The wire was then "rolled back like a carpet", and a saw used to separate each fragment. The remaining plaster was chipped away with a scalpel and needles. The final piece of the helmet, the skull cap, was next cut in half by pushing off the crest with long pins inserted through the bottom of the plaster head and then slicing through the middle of the head.

The central plaster core was then removed, and the remaining "thin skin of plaster and iron" separated into individual fragments as had been the ear flaps, neck guard and face mask. This process of separation took four months and left the helmet in more than 500 fragments. The result was "terrifying" to Williams. "One of only two known Anglo-Saxon helmets, an object illustrated in almost every book on the early medieval period, lay in pieces." (Note: Although Bruce-Mitford wrote that the new reconstruction had to be done "without sustaining the slightest damage", some damage did occur during the process. Part of the fragment of design 1 showing the face and body of a dancing warrior was crushed; its nose and mouth was later restored.)

After four months of disassembly, work began on a new construction of the helmet. This work was advanced largely by the discovery of new joins, marked by several breakthroughs in understanding. The new joins were mostly found by looking at the backs of the fragments, which retained "a unique blackened, rippled and bubbly nature", "wrinkled like screwed up paper and very black in colour". The distinctive nature is thought to result from a deteriorated leather lining permeated with iron oxide—indeed, this is the evidence substantiating the leather lining in the Royal Armouries replica—and allowed for the fragments' wrinkles to be matched under a microscope.

In this manner the skull cap was built out from the crest, aided by the discovery that only the two fluted strips bordering the crest were gilded; the six fragments with gilded moulding were consequently found to attach to the crest. The cheek guards, meanwhile, were shaped and substantially lengthened by joining three fragments from the sinister side of the first reconstruction with two fragments from the dexter side. The exposed areas by the jaw left by the first reconstruction were only eliminated near the end of the second, when an expert on arms and armour advised that the cheek guards should simply switch sides.

When a "reasonable picture of the original helmet" was in view, more than nine months of work into the second reconstruction, the repositioned fragments were placed against a "featureless plaster dome". This dome was itself built outwards with oil-free plasticine to match the original dimensions of the helmet. The fragments were held in place with long pins until a mixture of jute and adhesive was molded to the shape of the missing areas, and adhered to the fragments. The edges of the fragments were then coated with water-resistant resin, and plaster was spread atop the jute to level and smooth the helmet's surface.

The plaster was painted light brown to resemble the colour of the fragments while allowing the fragments themselves to stand out; lines were then drawn to indicate the edges of the panels. The result was a hollow helmet in which the backs of the fragments remain visible. On 2 November 1971, after eighteen months of time and a full year of work by Williams, the second and current reconstruction of the Sutton Hoo helmet was put on display.

=== Cultural impact ===
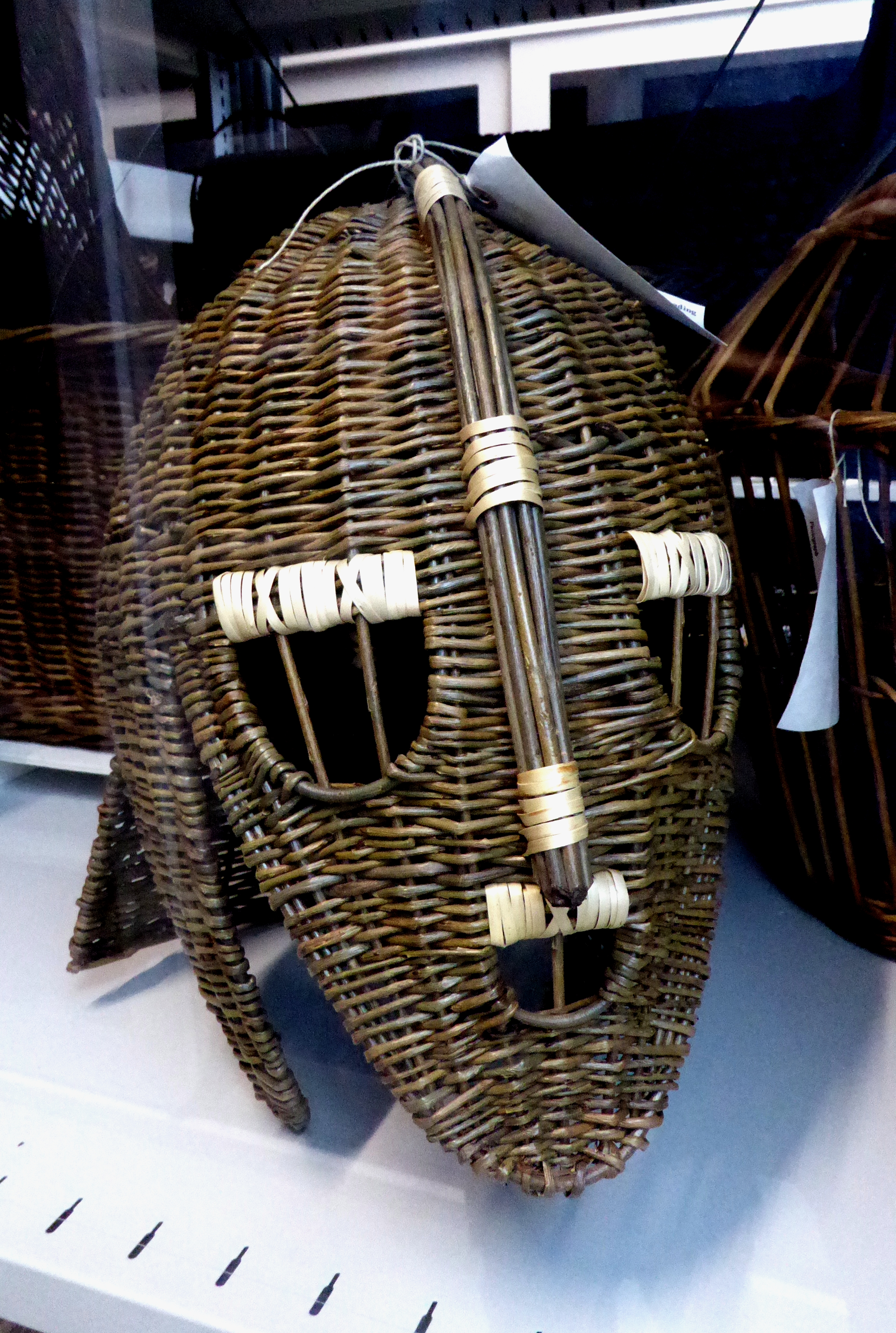
A wicker copy of the helmet on display at the Museum of English Rural Life in Reading, Berkshire

The 1971 reconstruction of the Sutton Hoo helmet was widely celebrated, and in the five decades since it has come to symbolise the Middle Ages, archaeology, and England. It is depicted on the covers of novels, textbooks, and scholarly publications, such as The Winter King by Bernard Cornwell and The Anglo-Saxons by James Campbell, and has influenced artists, filmmakers and designers. At the same time, the helmet has become the face of a time once known as the Dark Ages, but now recognised for its sophistication—in part because of the finds from Sutton Hoo—and referred to as the Middle Ages.

The helmet gives truth to a period of time known from depictions of warriors and mead halls in Beowulf, once thought fanciful, and personifies the Anglo-Saxons in post-Roman Britain. An iconic object from an archaeological find hailed as the "British Tutankhamen", in 2006 it was voted one of the 100 cultural icons of England alongside the Queen's head stamp, the double-decker bus, and the cup of tea.

=== Errors ===
Although termed "masterful" and "universally acclaimed" by contemporaries, the current reconstruction of the Sutton Hoo helmet left "a number of minor problems unsolved" and contains several slight inaccuracies. These are primarily confined to the neck guard, where "very little indeed of the original substance ... survives that can be positioned with any certainty." Two blocks of fragments on the bottom edge, and four blocks of fragments in the middle, are only speculatively placed, leaving some uncertainty about their correct locations. The resulting uncertainties relate to the placement of the individual fragments within the larger space, rather than to a problem with the proposed shape of the neck guard.

As currently reconstructed, the Sutton Hoo neck guard has three principal problems. Several fragments of design 5 are placed too high on the neck guard, which "shows more space below the lengths of transverse fluted strips than above them. The space left below is greater than the length of the die, while the space above is less than the length of the die." Corrected on the Royal Armouries replica, the configuration should allow for two full impressions of design 5, of equal length, joined vertically at their ends.

Furthermore, the lack of fragments from the neck guard leaves open the question of how many vertical strips of design 5 were used. Although seven strips were suggested in the reconstruction, "[t]here is no evidence to indicate that there were seven vertical ornamental strips on the lower portion of the neck-guard, and the suggestion . . . that the number should be cut to five is equally possible."

Even if seven is the accurate number, the current reconstruction shows an "implausible inward tilt" by the two strips flanking the central one; straightening the strips "would have the effect of allowing the ornamental strips to fan out naturally, leaving evenly-expanding wedges of plain surface between them." Finally, the neck guard hangs lower on the current reconstruction than it would have when made, for the top of the neck guard originally fitted inside the cap. This leaves the abutting edges of the dexter cheek and neck guards at different levels, and was corrected on the Royal Armouries replica.

== Royal Armouries replica ==
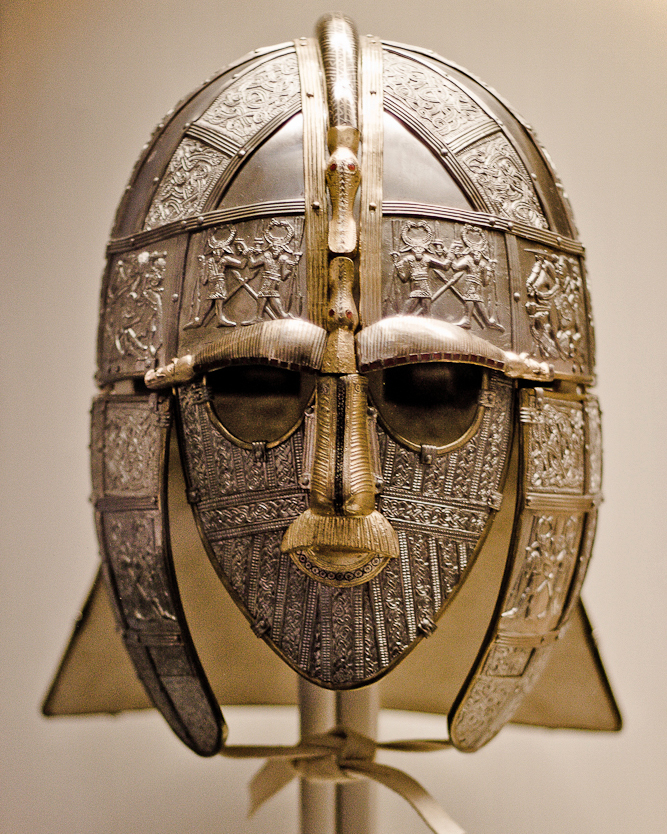
Royal Armouries replica

In 1973 the Royal Armouries collaborated with the British Museum to create a replica of the newly restored Sutton Hoo helmet. The museum provided a general blueprint of the design along with electrotypes of the decorative elements—nose and mouth piece, eyebrows, dragon heads, and pressblech foils—leaving the Master of the Armouries A. R. Duffy, along with his assistant H. Russell Robinson and senior conservation officer armourers E. H. Smith and A. Davis to complete the task.

A number of differences in construction were observed, such as a solid crest, lead solder used to back the decorative effects, and the technique employed to inlay the silver, although the helmet hewed closely to the original design. The differences led to the replica's weight of 3.74 kg (8.2 lb), or 1.24 kg (2.7 lb) heavier than the estimated weight of the original.

The finished replica was unveiled before an address at the Sachsensymposion in September 1973 with theatrical flair: the lights were dimmed; down the aisle came Nigel Williams holding a replica of the Sutton Hoo whetstone; and behind him followed Rupert Bruce-Mitford, wearing a carriage rug and with hands hieratically crossed, wearing the Royal Armouries helmet and reciting the opening lines of Beowulf.

The Royal Armouries replica clarified a number of details of the original helmet, and provided an example of what it looked like when new. It could also be worn and subjected to experimentation in a way the original could not. In particular the reproduction showed that the neck guard would have originally been set inside the cap, allowing it to move with more freedom and ride up, and thereby demonstrated an inaccuracy in the 1971 reconstruction, where the neck guard and the dexter cheek guard are misaligned.

The replica also corrected a second error in the reconstruction of the neck guard by affording an equal length to both the lower and upper instances of design 5, although it probably introduced an error by placing a visible billeted border on all four sides of each design 5 impression. That the replica could be worn also evinced several attributes of the original. It demonstrated the ranges of motion and vision that a wearer would have, and that with adequate padding in addition to the leather lining, people with heads of different sizes could comfortably wear the helmet.

Additionally, the replica showed that the helmet, while stifling, could realistically be worn in battle, and that it would bestow upon its wearer a commanding and sonorous voice. Finally, and most strikingly, the Royal Armouries replica simply showed how the Sutton Hoo helmet originally appeared. It showed the helmet as a shining white object rather than a rusted brown relic, and in doing so illustrated the lines in Beowulf referring to "the white helmet . . . enhanced by treasure" (ac se hwita helm . . . since geweorðad).

The replica is displayed in the British Museum alongside the original helmet in Room 41. It has also been exhibited worldwide, including stops in the United States, Japan, South Korea, China, Taiwan, and Hong Kong.

== Modern portrayals and use ==
=== In popular culture ===
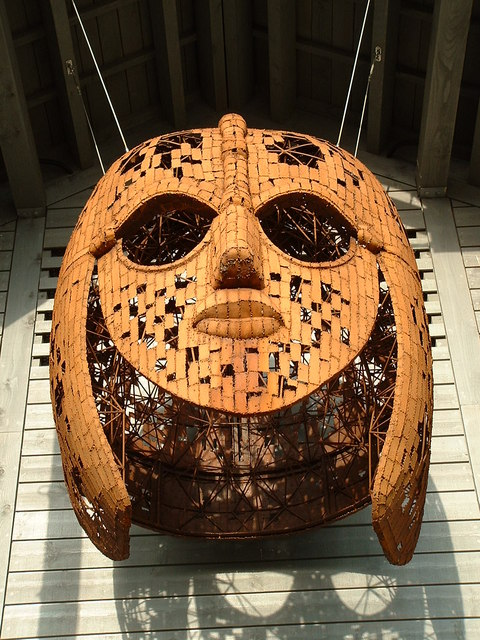
Sutton Hoo Helmet by Rick Kirby, outside the Sutton Hoo visitor centre

- A drawing of the Sutton Hoo helmet appears on the cover and loading screen of the 1983 video game Valhalla, and was featured prominently in related advertising.
- Replicas of the helmet are frequently seen in film and television, such as in Gladiator (2000), where a replica can be seen in the armoury when the gladiators are selecting armour to use in the Roman Colosseum, in Merlin, where one is shown in the bedroom of Arthur, in the British Museum in Night at the Museum: Secret of the Tomb (2014), in Beowulf: Return to the Shieldlands (2016), in the New York Sanctum Sanctorum in Doctor Strange (2016), and as a Meccano construction in Detectorists (2017).
- Suspended from the visitor centre at Sutton Hoo since March 2002 is a 1.8 m (5.9 ft) tall sculpture by Rick Kirby entitled Sutton Hoo Helmet.
- A set of six postage stamps issued by the Royal Mail in 2003 to commemorate the 250th anniversary of the British Museum featured the helmet alongside other Museum objects such as Hoa Hakananai'a and a mask of Xiuhtecuhtli.
- In 2006 the helmet was voted one of the 100 cultural icons of England as part of a project commissioned by the Department for Culture, Media and Sport.
- A 2009 series of manga drawings by Yukinobu Hoshino included depictions of objects from the British Museum such as the Sutton Hoo helmet and Rosetta Stone.
- The sixth episode of Relic: Guardians of the Museum, aired in 2010, required the contestants to answer questions about the Sutton Hoo ship-burial and helmet.
- Portrayals of the Sutton Hoo helmet are well represented on album covers, (Note: These are primarily limited to metal albums, and include some anachronistic depictions on Viking Metal album covers. If viking metallers have "read extensively" they have often done so "uncritically," eliding several centuries to join the Sutton Hoo helmet with the Viking Age.) including those by the bands Warrior (For Europe Only, 1983), Marillion (Grendel/The Web, 1984), Enslaved (Vikingligr Veldi, 1994), Solstice & Twisted Tower Dire (Solstice / Twisted Tower Dire, 1997), Amon Amarth (The Avenger, 1999), Saxon (Killing Ground, 2001), Hrossharsgrani (Schattenkrieger, 2003), Isen Torr (Mighty & Superior, 2004 [EP], 2008 [single]), Forefather (Steadfast, 2008; Curse of the Cwelled, 2015), Celtachor (In the Halls of Our Ancient Fathers, 2010), and Ancient Rites (Laguz, 2015).
  - Marillion's singer Fish often donned a replica of the helmet for performances of the song Grendel, inspired by the eponymous novel and by the poem Beowulf.
- The Erik den Röde brand of surströmming, a Swedish fermented herring dish, shows the helmet with "a gentle smile, presumably in anticipation of the delicacies inside."

== Bibliography ==
- Addyman, Peter (7 November 1989). "Anomalies in Law of Treasure Trove". Letters to the Editor. The Times. No. 63545. London. p. 17. Archived from the original on 17 December 2021.
- Alföldi, Andreas (1934). "Eine spätrömische Helmform und ihre Schicksale im Germanisch-Romanischen Mittelalter". Acta Archaeologica. V: 99–144. ISSN 0065-101X.
- Almgren, Bertil (1983). "Helmets, crowns and warriors' dress – from the Roman emperors to the chieftains of Uppland". In Lamm, Jan Peder & Nordstrom, Hans-Åke (eds.). Vendel Period Studies: transactions of the Boat-Grave Symposium in Stockholm, February 2–3, 1981. Studies – The Museum of National Antiquities, Stockholm. Vol. 2. Stockholm: Statens Historiska Museum. pp. 11–16. ISBN 91-7192-547-3.
- Ambrosiani, Björn (1983). "Regalia and symbols in the boat-graves". In Lamm, Jan Peder & Nordstrom, Hans-Åke (eds.). Vendel Period Studies: transactions of the Boat-Grave Symposium in Stockholm, February 2–3, 1981. Studies – The Museum of National Antiquities, Stockholm. Vol. 2. Stockholm: Statens Historiska Museum. pp. 23–30. ISBN 91-7192-547-3.
- Arnold, Thomas (1876). Beowulf: A Heroic Poem of the Eighth Century. London: Longmans, Green, and Co.
- Axboe, Morten (1987). "Copying in Antiquity: The Torslunda Plates". In Häßler, Hans-Jürgen (ed.). Studien zur Sachsenforschung. Vol. 6. Hildesheim: Lax. pp. 13–21. ISBN 3-7848-1617-7. Archived from the original on 17 December 2021.
- Axle Arts [@axle_arts] (14 June 2015). "Axle Arts on Twitter: "@NT_SuttonHoo thought you may be interested we have the original maquette of your Sutton Hoo helmet by #RickKirby" / Twitter" (Tweet). Archived from the original on 17 December 2021 – via Twitter.
- "Basket (object name) / Sutton Hoo helmet". University of Reading Virtual Reading Room. University of Reading. Archived from the original on 3 April 2026.
- Beck, Heinrich (1964). Einige vendelzeitliche Bilddenkmäler und die literarische Überlieferung. Sitzungsberichte (in German). Vol. 6. Munich: Bayerische Akademie der Wissenschaften. Archived from the original on 17 December 2021.
- Beowulf. n.d.
- Biddle, Martin (3 December 2015). "Rupert Leo Scott Bruce-Mitford: 1914–1994" (PDF). Biographical Memoirs of Fellows of the British Academy. XIV. British Academy: 58–86. Archived (PDF) from the original on 28 September 2020.
- Blackstone, William (1765). "Of the King's Revenue: XIII". Commentaries on the Laws of England. Vol. 1. Oxford: The Clarendon Press. pp. 285–286.
- Blake, Ian (11 February 1971). "Sutton Hoo Treasure yields more secrets". Archaeology. The Irish Times. No. 32, 782. Dublin. p. 12. ProQuest 525667108.
- "Boat Graves in Sweden". The Archaeological News Letter. 1 (5). Linden Publicity: 4, 7. August–September 1948. OCLC 297928388.
- Bosworth, Joseph & Toller, Thomas Northcote (1882). An Anglo-Saxon Dictionary. Oxford: The Clarendon Press.
- Brady, Caroline (1979). "'Weapons' in Beowulf: an analysis of the nominal compounds and an evaluation of the poet's use of them". Anglo-Saxon England. 8. Cambridge University Press: 79–141. doi:10.1017/S0263675100003045.
- Brookes, Stewart J. [@Stewart_Brookes] (16 February 2016). "Things that they don't let you do in the @britishmuseum – touch the "Sutton Hoo" helmet. #BeowulfITV" (Tweet). Archived from the original on 17 December 2021 – via Twitter.
- Brooks, Nicholas (1984). The Early History of the Church of Canterbury: Christ Church from 597 to 1066. Leicester: Leicester University Press. ISBN 0-7185-1182-4.
- Brown, David (1981). Brown, David; Campbell, James & Hawkes, Sonia Chadwick (eds.). "The Dating of the Sutton Hoo Coins". Anglo-Saxon Studies in Archaeology and History. British Archaeological Reports. 2: 71–86. doi:10.30861/9780860541387. ISBN 0-86054-138-X.
- Browne, John Paddy (1991). Map Cover Art: A Pictorial History of Ordnance Survey Cover Illustrations. London: Ordnance Survey. ISBN 0-319-00234-9.
- Bruce-Mitford, Rupert (September 1946). "Sutton Hoo Ship-Burial". East Anglian Magazine. 6 (1): 2–9, 43. OCLC 962284002.
- Bruce-Mitford, Rupert (1947). The Sutton Hoo Ship-Burial: A Provisional Guide. London: Trustees of the British Museum. OCLC 804319775.
- Bruce-Mitford, Rupert (May 1948a). "Sutton Hoo and Sweden". The Archaeological News Letter. 1 (2). Linden Publicity: 5–7. OCLC 297928388.
- Bruce-Mitford, Rupert (November–December 1948b). "The Sutton Hoo Ship-burial". The Norseman. VI (6). London: Lindsay Drummond: 394–400. OCLC 213743776.
- Bruce-Mitford, Rupert (1948c). "Saxon Rendlesham: Some Preliminary Considerations" (PDF). Proceedings of the Suffolk Institute of Archæology and Natural History. XXIV (3). Ipswich: Suffolk Institute of Archæology and Natural History: 228–251. Archived (PDF) from the original on 18 December 2021.
  - Edited and republished in Bruce-Mitford 1974a, ch. 2
- Bruce-Mitford, Rupert (1949). "The Sutton Hoo Ship-Burial: Recent theories and some comments on general interpretation" (PDF). Proceedings of the Suffolk Institute of Archæology and Natural History. XXV (1). Ipswich: Suffolk Institute of Archæology and Natural History: 1–78. Archived (PDF) from the original on 18 December 2021.
  - Edited and republished in Bruce-Mitford 1974a, ch. 1
- Bruce-Mitford, Rupert (1950a). "The Sutton Hoo Ship-Burial". Proceedings of the Royal Institution of Great Britain. XXXIV (3). London: Royal Institution of Great Britain: 440–449. OCLC 10622343.
- Bruce-Mitford, Rupert & Hill, George Francis (January–April 1950). "A note by Sir George Hill on the Sutton Hoo Treasure Trove Inquest". The Antiquaries Journal. XXX (1–2). London: Society of Antiquaries of London: 67–68. doi:10.1017/S0003581500088193. S2CID 163275205.
- Bruce-Mitford, Rupert (April 1950b). "The Sutton Hoo Ship-Burial: A New Chapter in Anglo-Swedish Relations". The Anglo-Swedish Review. London: The Swedish Chamber of Commerce for the United Kingdom: 69–72. OCLC 1085989833.
- Bruce-Mitford, Rupert (1952). "The Sutton Hoo Ship-Burial". In Hodgkin, Robert Howard (ed.). A History of the Anglo-Saxons. Vol. II (3rd ed.). London: Oxford University Press. pp. 696–734, 750–756. OCLC 842978410.
  - Note 21 (on the word wala) edited and republished in Bruce-Mitford 1974a, ch. 9
- Bruce-Mitford, Rupert & Allan, John (June 1952). "Sutton Hoo – A Rejoinder: With a Note on the Coins". Antiquity. XXVI (102): 76–82. doi:10.1017/S0003598X00023619. S2CID 163980192.
- Bruce-Mitford, Rupert (23 July 1965). "Mr. Herbert Maryon". Obituary. The Times. No. 56381. London. p. 14.
- Bruce-Mitford, Rupert (March 1968a). "Sutton Hoo Excavations, 1965–7". Antiquity. XLII (165): 36–39. doi:10.1017/S0003598X00033810. S2CID 163655331.
  - Edited and republished in Bruce-Mitford 1974a, ch. 5
- Bruce-Mitford, Rupert (December 1968b). "Fresh Observations on the Torslunda Plates". Frühmittelalterliche Studien. 2: 233–236. doi:10.1515/9783110242027.233. S2CID 185602132.
  - Edited and republished in Bruce-Mitford 1974a, ch. 10
- Bruce-Mitford, Rupert (Autumn 1972). "The Sutton Hoo Helmet: A New Reconstruction". The British Museum Quarterly. XXXVI (3–4). British Museum: 120–130. doi:10.2307/4423116. JSTOR 4423116.
  - Edited and republished in Bruce-Mitford 1974a, ch. 8
- Bruce-Mitford, Rupert (1974a). Aspects of Anglo-Saxon Archaeology: Sutton Hoo and Other Discoveries. London: Victor Gollancz Limited. ISBN 0-575-01704-X.
- Bruce-Mitford, Rupert (February 1974b). "The Sutton Hoo Helmet". The British Museum Society Bulletin (15): 6–7. OCLC 2679987.
  - Edited and republished in Bruce-Mitford 1974c
- Bruce-Mitford, Rupert (1974c). "Exhibits at Ballots: 5. A replica of the Sutton Hoo helmet made in the Tower Armouries, 1973". The Antiquaries Journal. LIV (2). London: Society of Antiquaries of London: 285–286. doi:10.1017/S0003581500042529. S2CID 246055329.
- Bruce-Mitford, Rupert (1975). The Sutton Hoo Ship-Burial, Volume 1: Excavations, Background, the Ship, Dating and Inventory. London: British Museum Publications. ISBN 0-7141-1334-4.
- Bruce-Mitford, Rupert (1978). The Sutton Hoo Ship-Burial, Volume 2: Arms, Armour and Regalia. London: British Museum Publications. ISBN 0-7141-1335-2.
- Bruce-Mitford, Rupert (1979). The Sutton Hoo Ship-Burial: Reflections after thirty years. University of York Medieval Monograph Series. Vol. 2. York: William Sessions. ISBN 0-900657-46-4.
- Bruce-Mitford, Rupert (December 1982). "The Sutton Hoo Helmet-Reconstruction and the Design of the Royal Harness and Sword-Belt: A Reply to Hofrat Dr. Ortwin Gamber with some additional comments on the Sutton Hoo Arms and Armour". The Journal of the Arms & Armour Society. X (6). London: Arms & Armour Society: 217–274. ISSN 0004-2439.
- Bruce-Mitford, Rupert (1983a). The Sutton Hoo Ship-Burial, Volume 3: Late Roman and Byzantine silver, hanging-bowls, drinking vessels, cauldrons and other containers, textiles, the lyre, pottery bottle and other items. Vol. I. London: British Museum Publications. ISBN 0-7141-0529-5.
- Bruce-Mitford, Rupert (1983b). The Sutton Hoo Ship-Burial, Volume 3: Late Roman and Byzantine silver, hanging-bowls, drinking vessels, cauldrons and other containers, textiles, the lyre, pottery bottle and other items. Vol. II. London: British Museum Publications. ISBN 0-7141-0530-9.
- Bruce-Mitford, Rupert (1986). "The Sutton Hoo Ship-Burial: Some Foreign Connections". Angli e Sassoni al di qua e al di là del mare: 26 aprile-lo maggio 1984. Settimane di studio del Centro italiano di studi sull'alto Medioevo. Vol. XXXII. Spoleto: Centro italiano di studi sull'alto Medioevo. pp. 171–210. OCLC 569209966.
- Bruce-Mitford, Rupert (1989a). "Early Thoughts on Sutton Hoo" (PDF). Saxon (10). Woodbridge: The Sutton Hoo Society. Archived (PDF) from the original on 18 December 2021.
- Bruce-Mitford, Rupert (1989b). Anglo-Saxon and Mediaeval Archaeology, History and Art, with special reference to Sutton Hoo: The highly important Working Library and Archive of more than 6,000 titles formed by Dr. Rupert L.S. Bruce-Mitford FBA, D.Litt., FSA. Wickmere: Merrion Book Co. OCLC 858531182.
  - Includes prefatory essays My Japanese Background and Forty Years with Sutton Hoo by Bruce-Mitford. The latter was republished in Carver 2004, pp. 23–28.
- Brunning, Sue [@SueBrunningBM] (5 January 2017). "Sue Brunning *is furloughed fur now* on Twitter: "Looks like I may have to re-date the #SuttonHoo helmet... #gladiator" / Twitter" (Tweet). Archived from the original on 18 December 2021 – via Twitter.
- Brunning, Sue (24 July 2019). "Eighty years (and more) of Sutton Hoo". Blog: Curator's Corner. British Museum. Archived from the original on 20 September 2019.
- "Burial Ship Gold & Silver Given to Woman: 'Treasure Trove' Jury Decides, Collection Worth Vast Sums, Saxon Relics in Village Hall". The Daily Telegraph and Morning Post. No. 26271. London. 15 August 1939. pp. 1, 13. Archived from the original on 18 December 2021.
- "Burial Ship's Treasures, Gift to British Museum: Search for Traces of Skeleton". The Times. No. 48391. London. 23 August 1939. p. 9. Archived from the original on 18 December 2021.
- Butcher, Mary & Mitchell, Victoria (2010). East Anglian Basketry. Norwich: Norwich University College of the Arts. Archived from the original on 10 November 2019.
- Campbell, James (1992). "The Impact of the Sutton Hoo Discovery on the Study of Anglo-Saxon History". In Kendall, Calvin B. & Wells, Peter S. (eds.). Voyage to the Other World: The Legacy of Sutton Hoo. Medieval Cultures. Vol. 5. Minneapolis: University of Minnesota Press. pp. 79–101. ISBN 0-8166-2023-7. JSTOR 10.5749/j.ctttv0mr.8.
  - Edited and republished as Campbell, James (2000). "The Impact of the Sutton Hoo Discovery on the Study of Anglo-Saxon History". In Campbell, James (ed.). The Anglo-Saxon State. London: Hambledon and London. pp. 55–83. ISBN 1-85285-176-7.
- Campbell, James (25 September 2014). "Rædwald [Redwald] (d. 616x27)". Oxford Dictionary of National Biography (online ed.). Oxford University Press. doi:10.1093/ref:odnb/23265. (Subscription, Wikipedia Library access or UK public library membership required.)
- Caple, Chris (2000). "Restoration: 9A Case study: Sutton Hoo Helmet". Conservation Skills: Judgement, Method and Decision Making. Abingdon: Routledge. pp. 132–135. ISBN 0-415-18880-6.
- Carver, Martin (1986). "Sutton Hoo in Context". Angli e Sassoni al di qua e al di là del mare: 26 aprile-lo maggio 1984. Settimane di studio del Centro italiano di studi sull'alto Medioevo. Vol. XXXII. Spoleto: Centro italiano di studi sull'alto Medioevo. pp. 77–123. OCLC 569209966.
- Carver, Martin (1992). "Ideology and Allegiance in East Anglia". Sutton Hoo: Fifty Years After. American Early Medieval Studies. Vol. 2. Oxford, Ohio: Miami University. pp. 173–182. ISBN 1-879836-01-7.
  - ISBN incorrectly printed as ISBN 1-879836-02-7
- Carver, Martin (1995). "Boat-burial in Britain: Ancient Custom or Political Signal?". In Crumlin-Pedersen, Ole & Munch Thye, Birgitte (eds.). The Ship as Symbol in Prehistoric and Medieval Scandinavia. Publications from the National Museum: Studies in Archaeology & History. Vol. 1. Copenhagen: National Museum of Denmark. pp. 111–124. ISBN 87-89384-01-6.
- Carver, Martin (2004). "Before 1983" (PDF). The Sutton Hoo Research Project 1983-2001 (Report). Vol. 2. Archaeology Data Service. doi:10.5284/1000266. Archived (PDF) from the original on 1 September 2021.
- Carver, Martin (2005). Sutton Hoo: A seventh-century princely burial ground and its context. London: British Museum Press. ISBN 978-0-7141-2322-6.
- Chadwick, H. Munro (March 1940). "The Sutton Hoo Ship-Burial: Who Was He?". Antiquity. XIV (53): 76–87. doi:10.1017/S0003598X00014812. S2CID 163574359.
- Chaney, William A. (1970). The Cult of Kingship in Anglo-Saxon England: The Transition from Paganism to Christianity. Manchester: Manchester University Press. LCCN 72-79041. SBN 520-01401-4.
- Chitty, Joseph (1820). "Of the King as the Fountain of Honours, Dignities, Privileges, and Franchises; and the nature of them: Treasure trove". A Treatise on the Law of the Prerogatives of the Crown. London: Joseph Butterworth and Son. pp. 152–153.
- Coatsworth, Elizabeth & Pinder, Michael (2002). Hines, John & Cubitt, Catherine (eds.). The Art of the Anglo-Saxon Goldsmith: Fine Metalwork in Anglo-Saxon England, its Practice and Practitioners. Anglo-Saxon Studies. Vol. 2. Woodbridge: The Boydell Press. ISBN 0-85115-883-8.
- Cocke, Richard (29 July 2009). "Sutton Hoo Helmet". Recording Archive for Public Sculpture in Norfolk & Suffolk. Archived from the original on 25 December 2021.
- Cocke, Richard (2013). Public Sculpture of Norfolk and Suffolk. Public Sculpture of Britain. Vol. 16. Liverpool: Liverpool University Press. ISBN 978-1-84631-712-5.
- Connor, Patricia, ed. (2003). All the Queen's Horses: The Role of the Horse in British History. Lexington: Kentucky Horse Park. ISBN 1-56469-108-X.
- Cramp, Rosemary J. (1957). "Beowulf and Archaeology" (PDF). Medieval Archaeology. 1. Society for Medieval Archaeology: 57–77. doi:10.1080/00766097.1957.11735382. Archived (PDF) from the original on 11 October 2021.
- Crawford, O. G. S. (March 1940). "The Sutton Hoo Ship-Burial: The Coins: A Summary". Antiquity. XIV (53): 64–68. doi:10.1017/S0003598X00014794. S2CID 161160134.
- Davidson, Hilda Ellis (1968). "Archaeology and Beowulf". In Garmonsway, George Norman & Simpson, Jacqueline (eds.). Beowulf and its Analogues. London: J. M. Dent & Sons. pp. 350–360. ISBN 9780460038041. SBN 460-03804-4.
- Detectorists Fans [@DetectoristsF] (15 May 2021). "Always loved the details in this scene from series 3. 1st of all, Andy gets distracted whilst looking for his drill by his home made Sutton Hoo helmet (which is also the DMDC logo) but just over his shoulder is a jar of pipe bits, as referenced briefly in series 2. #detectorists" (Tweet). Archived from the original on 26 December 2022 – via Twitter.
- Donahue, Lucie (14 June 2006). "The Sutton Hoo Helmet". Masterpieces of the British Museum. Episode 1. BBC Four.
  - Part 1 (00:00 to 15:00); Part 2 (15:01 to 29:02)
- "Drawing (2009,3020.1)". The British Museum. British Museum. Archived from the original on 25 December 2021.
- "Drawing (2009,3020.2)". The British Museum. British Museum. Archived from the original on 25 December 2021.
- "Drawing (2009,3020.3)". The British Museum. British Museum. Archived from the original on 25 December 2021.
- Echard, Siân (2010). "Boom: Seeing Beowulf in Pictures and Print". In Clark, David & Perkins, Nicholas (eds.). Anglo-Saxon Culture and the Modern Imagination. Cambridge: D. S. Brewer. pp. 129–145. ISBN 978-1-84384-251-4. JSTOR 10.7722/j.ctt169wfjg.15.
- "Episode 6 Relic: Guardians of the Museum". Subsaga. Archived from the original on 25 December 2021.
- Evans, Angela Care (1986). The Sutton Hoo Ship Burial. London: British Museum Publications. ISBN 0-7141-0544-9.
- Evans, Angela Care (2001). "Sutton Hoo and Snape, Vendel and Valsgärde". In Hultén, Pontus & von Plessen, Marie-Louise (eds.). The true story of the Vandals. Museum Vandalorum Publications. Vol. 1. Värnamo: Museum Vandalorum. pp. 48–64. ISSN 1650-5549.
- Festival of Britain, 1951: Catalogue of Exhibits, South Bank Exhibition. London: His Majesty's Stationery Office. 1951. OCLC 17721988.
- "First Full Story of the English King Tut's Treasure Tomb: Gems, Gold, Chain-Mail – and Shopping Bag". Daily Mail. No. 13, 503. London. 4 August 1939. pp. 9–10. Archived from the original on 25 December 2021.
- "Fish to Resurrect 'Grendel'". Up the Downstair. 10 July 2012. Archived from the original on 16 January 2017.
- Farrell, Robert T. (1972). Beowulf, Swedes and Geats (PDF). Saga-Book of the Viking Society for Northern. Vol. XVIII. London: Viking Society for Northern Research.
- Faussett, Thomas Godfrey (1865). "On the Present State of the Law of 'Treasure-Trove'". The Archaeological Journal. XXII. London: The Archaeological Institute of Great Britain and Ireland: 15–32. doi:10.1080/00665983.1865.10851306.
- Foster, Jennifer (1977b). "Bronze Boar Figurines in Iron Age and Roman Britain". British Archaeological Reports. 39. ISBN 0-904531-74-0.
- Frank, Roberta (1992). "Beowulf and Sutton Hoo: The Odd Couple". In Kendall, Calvin B. & Wells, Peter S. (eds.). Voyage to the Other World: The Legacy of Sutton Hoo. Medieval Cultures. Vol. 5. Minneapolis: University of Minnesota Press. pp. 47–64. ISBN 0-8166-2023-7. JSTOR 10.5749/j.ctttv0mr.8.
- Frank, Roberta (2008). "The Boar on the Helmet". In Karkov, Catherine E. & Damico, Helen (eds.). Aedificia Nova: Studies in Honor of Rosemary Cramp. Publications of the Richard Rawlinson Center. Kalamazoo: Medieval Institute Publications, Western Michigan University. pp. 76–88. ISBN 978-1-58044-110-0.
- Gamber, Ortwin (June 1966). "The Sutton Hoo Military Equipment – An Attempted Reconstruction". The Journal of the Arms & Armour Society. V (6). Translated by Hayward, John Forrest. London: Arms & Armour Society: 265–289. ISSN 0004-2439.
- Gamber, Ortwin (December 1982). "Some Notes on the Sutton Hoo Military Equipment". The Journal of the Arms & Armour Society. X (6). Translated by Eaves, Ian. London: Arms & Armour Society: 208–216. ISSN 0004-2439.
- Giles, John Allen, ed. (1849). The Venerable Bede's Ecclesiastical History of England, also the Anglo-Saxon Chronicle. Bohn's Antiquarian Library (2nd ed.). London: Henry G. Bohn.
- Green, Charles (1963). Sutton Hoo: The Excavation of a Royal Ship-Burial. New York: Barnes & Noble.
- "Grendel by Marillion". Songfacts. Archived from the original on 26 December 2021.
- Grierson, Philip (June 1952). "The Dating of the Sutton Hoo Coins". Antiquity. XXVI (102): 83–86. doi:10.1017/S0003598X00023620. S2CID 163648957.
- Grierson, Philip (March 1970). "The Purpose of the Sutton Hoo Coins". Antiquity. XLIV (173): 18. doi:10.1017/S0003598X0004093X.
- Grohskopf, Bernice (1970). The Treasure of Sutton Hoo: Ship-Burial for an Anglo-Saxon King. New York: Atheneum. LCCN 74-86555.
- Hall, John Richard Clark (1914). Beowulf: A Metrical Translation into Modern English. Cambridge: Cambridge University Press.
- Hall, John Richard Clark (1916). A Concise Anglo-Saxon Dictionary (2nd ed.). New York: The Macmillan Company.
- Haseloff, Günther (1979). Kunststile des Frühen Mittelalters: Völkerwanderungs- und Merowingerzeit (in German). Stuttgart: Württembergisches Landesmuseum. OCLC 10686636.
- Hatto, Arthur Thomas (August 1957a). "Snake-swords and Boar-helmets in Beowulf". English Studies. XXXVIII (4): 145–160. doi:10.1080/00138385708596994.

- Updated by Hatto, Arthur Thomas (December 1957b). "Notes and News: Snake-swords and Boar-helmets". English Studies. XXXVIII (6): 257–259. doi:10.1080/00138385708597004.

- Hauck, Karl (1954). "Herrschaftszeichen eines Wodanistischen Königtums". Jahrbuch für fränkische Landesforschung (in German). 14: 9–66. Archived from the original on 27 December 2021.
- Hawkes, Christopher (1976). "Review of Aspects of Anglo-Saxon Archaeology". The Antiquaries Journal. LVI (1). London: The Oxford University Press: 104–105. doi:10.1017/S0003581500019892. S2CID 163031781.
- Hawthorne, John G. & Smith, Cyril Stanley (1979). "Work Pressed on Dies". Theophilus: On Divers Arts (2nd ed.). New York: Dover Publications, Inc. pp. 153–154. ISBN 0-486-23784-2. LCCN 99-23209.
- Heaney, Seamus (2000). Beowulf: A New Verse Translation. New York: W. W. Norton & Company. ISBN 0-393-32097-9.
  - Republished with criticism in Donoghue, Daniel, ed. (2002). Beowulf, A Verse Translation: Authoritative Text, Contexts, Criticism. Translated by Heaney, Seamus. New York: W. W. Norton. ISBN 0-393-97580-0.
- "helmet; replica (SHR.2)". Collection Online. British Museum. Archived from the original on 1 January 2022.
- Herben, Stephen J. Jr. (January 1937). "A Note on the Helm in Beowulf". Modern Language Notes. LII (1). Baltimore: The Johns Hopkins Press: 34–36. doi:10.2307/2912312. JSTOR 2912312.
- "Herbert James Maryon". Mapping the Practice and Profession of Sculpture in Britain and Ireland 1851–1951. University of Glasgow History of Art. 2011. Archived from the original on 27 December 2021.
- Hines, John (2010). "Units of Account in Gold and Silver in Seventh-Century England: Scillingas, Sceattas and Pæningas" (PDF). The Antiquaries Journal. 90. Society of Antiquaries of London: 153–173. doi:10.1017/s0003581510000089. S2CID 14521051. Archived (PDF) from the original on 6 December 2021.
- "A History of the World – Object : Sutton Hoo helmet". BBC Online. BBC. 2010. Archived from the original on 27 December 2021.
- Holmqvist, Wilhelm (1960). "The Dancing Gods". Acta Archaeologica. XXXI (2–3): 101–127. ISSN 0065-101X.
- Hoppitt, Rosemary (2001). "'I have a little something that might be of interest to you.....': a home movie of the 1939 excavation Sutton Hoo surfaces in Vancouver" (PDF). Saxon (34): 1. Archived (PDF) from the original on 27 December 2021.
- Huey, Arthur D. (22 March 1962). "Mirrors Fail to Reflect Enthusiasm". The Kansas City Times. Vol. 125, no. 70. Kansas City, Missouri. pp. 1–2. Archived from the original on 27 December 2021 – via Newspapers.com.
- "ICONS of England – the 100 ICONS as voted by the public". Culture24. Archived from the original on 27 December 2021.
- The Institution of Mechanical Engineers (1918). "Herbert James Maryon, in To be considered by the Applications Committee on Wednesday, 24th April, and by the Council on Friday, 3rd May 1918.". Proposals for Membership, Etc. pp. 337–338 – via Ancestry.com.
- Kaske, Robert E. (October 1967). "The Silver Spoons of Sutton Hoo". Speculum. XLI (4). The Mediaeval Academy of America: 670–672. doi:10.2307/2851097. JSTOR 2851097. S2CID 162531857.
- Kemble, John Mitchell (1837). The Anglo-Saxon Poem of Beowulf. London: William Pickering.
- Kendrick, T .D.; Kitzinger, Ernst & Allen, Derek (December 1939). "The Sutton Hoo Finds". The British Museum Quarterly. XIII (4). British Museum: 111–136. JSTOR 4422181.
- Kendrick, T. D. (December 1940). "Saxon Art at Sutton Hoo". The Burlington Magazine for Connoisseurs. LXXVII (453). Burlington Magazine Publications: 174–175, 178–183. JSTOR 868170.
- Keynes, Simon (1992). "Rædwald the Bretwalda". In Kendall, Calvin B. & Wells, Peter S. (eds.). Voyage to the Other World: The Legacy of Sutton Hoo. Medieval Cultures. Vol. 5. Minneapolis: University of Minnesota Press. pp. 103–123. ISBN 0-8166-2023-7. JSTOR 10.5749/j.ctttv0mr.8.
- Kitzinger, Ernst (March 1940). "The Sutton Hoo Ship-Burial: The Silver". Antiquity. XIV (53): 40–63. doi:10.1017/S0003598X00014782. S2CID 163424743.
- Klaeber, Friedrich (1922). Beowulf and The Fight at Finnsburg. Boston: D.C. Heath & Co.
- Lafaurie, Jean (1959–1960). "Le Trésor d'Escharen (Pays-Bas)". Revue Numismatique. VI (in French). II: 152–210. Archived from the original on 27 December 2021.
- Lambert, Simon (13 January 2014). "The Early History of Preventive Conservation in Great Britain and the United States (1850–1950)". CeROArt. 9 (9). revues.org. doi:10.4000/ceroart.3765.
- Lindqvist, Sune (September 1948b). "Sutton Hoo and Beowulf". Antiquity. XXII (87). Translated by Bruce-Mitford, Rupert: 131–140. doi:10.1017/S0003598X00019669. S2CID 164075295.
  - Translation of Lindqvist, Sune (1948a). "Sutton Hoo och Beowulf" [Sutton Hoo and Beowulf] (PDF). Fornvännen [The Friend of the Past] (in Swedish). 43: 94–110. ISSN 0015-7813. Archived (PDF) from the original on 27 December 2021.
- MacGregor, Neil (2011). "The Sutton Hoo Helmet". A History of the World in 100 Objects. New York: Viking. pp. 301–306. ISBN 978-0-670-02270-0.
- Mackintosh, Marjorie (1986). "The Sources of the Horseman and Fallen Enemy Motif on the Tombstones of the Western Roman Empire". Journal of the British Archaeological Association. CXXXIX: 1–21. doi:10.1179/jba.1986.139.1.1.
- Maddicott, John R. (October 1993). "Review: The Age of Sutton Hoo: The Seventh Century in North-Western Europe, Voyage to the Other World: The Legacy of Sutton Hoo, & Sutton Hoo: Fifty Years After". The English Historical Review. CVIII (429). Longman Group UK Limited: 968–971. doi:10.1093/ehr/CVIII.CCCCXXIX.968. JSTOR 575539.
- Map of Britain in the Dark Ages (2nd ed.). Southampton: Ordnance Survey. 1966.
- Martin-Clarke, D. Elizabeth (1947). Culture in Early Anglo-Saxon England (PDF). Baltimore: The Johns Hopkins Press. Archived (PDF) from the original on 3 January 2019.
- Maryon, Herbert (September 1947). "The Sutton Hoo Helmet". Antiquity. XXI (83): 137–144. doi:10.1017/S0003598X00016598. S2CID 163948719.
- Maryon, Herbert (1971). Metalwork and Enamelling (5th ed.). New York: Dover Publications, Inc. ISBN 0-486-22702-2.
- Marzinzik, Sonja (2007). The Sutton Hoo Helmet. Objects in Focus. London: British Museum Press. ISBN 978-0-7141-2325-7.
- Meaney, Audrey (1964). A Gazetteer of Early Anglo-Saxon Burial Sites. London: George Allen & Unwin. OCLC 463159479.
- Mitchell, Henry (10 October 1970). "Treasures of Sutton Hoo: 'Beowulf' Origins at Sutton Hoo". The Washington Post. Washington, D.C. pp. D1, D6.
- Mitchell, Henry (17 January 1971). "Whooo Died at Sutton Hoo?". The Shreveport Times. Vol. 100, no. 51. Shreveport, Louisiana. p. 11-F. Archived from the original on 28 December 2021 – via Newspapers.com.
- Moncrieff, Charles Scott (1921). Widsith, Beowulf, Finnsburgh, Waldere, Deor: Done Into Common English After the Old Manner. New York: E. P. Dutton & Co.
- Money & Medals Net [@Moneymedalsnet] (8 November 2017). "Money & Medals Net on Twitter: "Oh my God look at that Meccano Sutton Hoo helmet! Amazing! #Detectorists https://t.co/sMCS4EFkDn" / Twitter" (Tweet). Archived from the original on 28 December 2021 – via Twitter.
- Mortimer, Paul (2011). Woden's Warriors: Warfare, Beliefs, Arms and Armour in Northern Europe during the 6th and 7th Centuries. Ely: Anglo-Saxon Books. ISBN 978-1898281603.
- Mortimer, Paul & Pollington, Stephen (2013). Remaking the Sutton Hoo Stone: The Ansell-Roper Replica and its Context. Little Downham: Anglo-Saxon Books. ISBN 978-1-898281-69-6.
- Nerman, Birger (1948). "Sutton Hoo – en svensk kunga- eller hövdinggrav?" (PDF). Fornvännen [The Friend of the Past] (in Swedish). 48 (3): 65–93. ISSN 0015-7813. Archived (PDF) from the original on 6 December 2021.
- "New icons of Englishness unveiled". BBC News. BBC. 27 April 2006. Archived from the original on 23 May 2006.
- Newton, Sam (1993). The Origins of Beowulf and the Pre-Viking Kingdom of East Anglia. Cambridge: D. S. Brewer. ISBN 0-85991-361-9. LCCN 92-36873.
- Nickel, Helmut (2002). "The Mutual Influence of Europe and Asia in the Field of Arms and Armour". In Nicolle, David (ed.). A Companion to Medieval Arms and Armour. Woodbridge: The Boydell Press. pp. 107–125. ISBN 0-85115-872-2.
- Oddy, William Andrew & Hughes, Michael J. (1972). "The Specific Gravity Method for the Analysis of Gold Coins". In Hall, E. T. & Metcalf, David Michael (eds.). Methods of Chemical and Metallurgical Investigation of Ancient Coinage: A Symposium Held by the Royal Numismatic Society at Burlington House, London on 9-11 December 1970. Royal Numismatic Society Special Publication. Vol. 8. London: Royal Numismatic Society. pp. 75–87. OCLC 962994865.
- Oddy, William Andrew (1980). "Teknisk undersökning av Sutton Hoo-fynden". In Sandwall, Ann (ed.). Vendeltid. Historia i fickformat (in Swedish). Stockholm: Statens Historiska Museum. pp. 172–192. ISBN 91-7192-453-1.
  - Translated into English as Oddy, William Andrew (2004). "The Scientific Work on the Sutton Hoo Ship Burial". In Martini, Marco; Milazzo, Mario & Piacentini, Mario (eds.). Physics Methods in Archaeometry. Proceedings of the International School of Physics. Vol. CLIV. Amsterdam: IOS Press. pp. 269–280. doi:10.3254/978-1-61499-010-9-269. ISBN 1-58603-424-3. LCCN 2004104423.
- Oddy, William Andrew (25 April 1992). "Nigel Williams". Obituaries. The Independent. No. 1, 723. London. p. 34. Archived from the original on 1 January 2022.
- Oddy, William Andrew (2002). "The Conservation of Marble Sculptures in the British Museum before 1975". Studies in Conservation. 47 (3). London: International Institute for Conservation: 145–154. doi:10.2307/1506868. JSTOR 1506868.
- Phillips, C. W.; Kendrick, T. D.; Plenderleith, H. J.; Godwin, Harry & Zeuner, F. E. (April 1940). "The Excavation of the Sutton Hoo Ship-burial". The Antiquaries Journal. XX (2). Society of Antiquaries of London: 149–202. doi:10.1017/S0003581500009677. S2CID 162872963.
- Phillips, C. W. (July 1940). "The Sutton Hoo Ship Burial". Antiques. XXXVIII (1): 12–14. ISSN 0003-5939.
- Phillips, C. W. (February 1941). "Ancestor of the British Navy: England's Oldest Known War Vessel Is Unearthed, Laden with Remarkable Treasures of an Anglo-Saxon Ruler". The National Geographic Magazine. LXXIX (2). The National Geographic Society: 247–268.
- Phillips, C. W. (1987). My Life in Archaeology. Gloucester: Alan Sutton. ISBN 0-86299-362-8.
- Porck, Thijs (17 December 2015). "Anglo-Saxon props: Three TV series and films that use early medieval objects". Dutch Anglo-Saxonist. Archived from the original on 6 December 2017.
- Porck, Thijs [@thijsporck] (23 July 2017). "Spotted in Marvel's Doctor Strange: Sutton Hoo Helmet replica!" (Tweet). Archived from the original on 31 January 2018 – via Twitter.
- Price, Neil & Mortimer, Paul (2014). "An Eye for Odin? Divine Role-Playing in the Age of Sutton Hoo". European Journal of Archaeology. 17 (3). European Association of Archaeologists: 517–538. doi:10.1179/1461957113Y.0000000050. S2CID 161907810.
- Prou, Maurice (1892). Les Monnaies Mérovingiennes. Catalogue des Monnaies Françaises de la Bibliothèque Nationale. Paris: C. Rollin & Feuardent.
- Richards, Julian D. (1992). "Anglo Saxon Symbolism". In Carver, Martin (ed.). The Age of Sutton Hoo: The Seventh Century in North-Western Europe. Woodbridge: The Boydell Press. pp. 131–147. ISBN 0-85115-330-5.
- "Rick Kirby: 29 May – 20 June 2015" (PDF). Axle Arts. 2015. Archived (PDF) from the original on 1 January 2022.
- "Saxon Chief's Jewels Dug Up: P.C.s Guard his Grave". Daily Mail. No. 13499. London. 31 July 1939. p. 5.
- Sherlock, David A. (January 1972). "Saul, Paul and the Silver Spoons from Sutton Hoo". Speculum. XLVII (1). The Mediaeval Academy of America: 91–95. doi:10.2307/2851219. JSTOR 2851219. S2CID 161169864.
- "Ship Burial in Suffolk, Jury's Finding on Gold and Silver: Not 'Treasure Trove'". Home News. The Times. No. 48384. London. 15 August 1939. p. 9.
- Speake, George (1980). Anglo-Saxon Animal Art. Oxford: Clarendon Press. ISBN 0-19-813194-1. LCCN 79-41091.
- Stahl, Alan M. (1992). "The Nature of the Sutton Hoo Coins Parcel". In Kendall, Calvin B. & Wells, Peter S. (eds.). Voyage to the Other World: The Legacy of Sutton Hoo. Medieval Cultures. Vol. 5. Minneapolis: University of Minnesota Press. pp. 3–14. ISBN 0-8166-2023-7. JSTOR 10.5749/j.ctttv0mr.8.
- Stahl, Alan M. & Oddy, William Andrew (1992). "The Date of the Sutton Hoo Coins". In Farrell, Robert & Neuman de Vegvar, Carol (eds.). Sutton Hoo: Fifty Years After. American Early Medieval Studies. Vol. 2. Oxford, Ohio: Miami University. pp. 129–147. ISBN 1-879836-01-7.
  - ISBN incorrectly printed as ISBN 1-879836-02-7
- Stanley, Eric G. (1981). "the date of beowulf: some doubts and no conclusions". In Chase, Colin (ed.). The Dating of Beowulf. Toronto Old English Series. Vol. 6. Toronto: University of Toronto Press. pp. 197–211. ISBN 0-8020-7879-6. JSTOR 10.3138/j.ctt1287v33.18.
- Steuer, Heiko (1987). "Helm und Ringschwert: Prunkbewaffnung und Rangabzeichen germanischer Krieger" [Helmet and Ring-Sword: Ornamental Weapons and Insignia of Germanic Warriors]. In Häßler, Hans-Jürgen (ed.). Studien zur Sachsenforschung [Studies in Saxon Research] (in German). Vol. 6. Hildesheim: Lax. pp. 189–236. ISBN 3-7848-1617-7.
- Stjerna, Knut (1912). Essays on Questions Connected with the Old English Poem of Beowulf. Extra Series. Vol. III. Translated by Hall, John Richard Clark. London: Viking Club: Society for Northern Research.
- Storms, Godfrid (1978). "The Sutton Hoo Ship Burial: An Interpretation". Berichten van de Rijksdienst voor het Oudheidkundig Bodemonderzoek. 28: 309–344. doi:10.17026/dans-xat-ww8a.
- "Supplement". The London Gazette. No. 40787. 25 May 1956. pp. 3099–3138. Archived from the original on 2 January 2022.
- "The Sutton Hoo Helmet (1939,1010.93)". The British Museum. British Museum. Archived from the original on 27 December 2021.
- "Sutton Hoo helmet by Bunty Ball". The Museum of English Rural Life. 12 November 2018. Archived from the original on 3 January 2022.
- "Sutton Hoo helmet to feature on stamps". Ipswich Star. Ipswich. 30 August 2003. Archived from the original on 3 January 2022.
- "Sutton Hoo in 1951". Gerwardus. 20 September 2011. Archived from the original on 3 January 2022.
- "Symposia since 1949". Internationales Sachsensymposion. 2017. Archived from the original on 3 January 2022.
  - 1973 programme available here
- Tacitus (1868). "Germany and its Tribes". The Agricola and Germania of Tacitus. Translated by Church, Alfred John & Brodribb, William Jackson. London: Macmillan. ISBN 978-1-02-237238-2.
- Tacitus (1886). "Germania". In Church, Alfred John & Brodribb, William Jackson (eds.). The Agricola and Germania of Tacitus: With a Revised Text, English Notes, and Maps. London: Macmillan.
- Thorpe, Benjamin (1855). The Anglo-Saxon Poems of Beowulf, the Scôp or Gleeman's Tale, and the Fight at Finnesburg. Oxford: John Henry Parker. p. 69.
- Tolkien, J. R. R. (2014). Tolkien, Christopher (ed.). Beowulf: A Translation and Commentary. New York: Houghton Mifflin Harcourt. ISBN 978-0-544-44278-8.
- Trafford, Simon & Pluskowski, Aleks (2007). "Antichrist Superstars: The Vikings in Hard Rock and Heavy Metal". In Marshall, David W. (ed.). Mass Market Medieval: Essays on the Middle Ages in Popular Culture. Jefferson, NC: McFarland & Company, Inc. pp. 57–73. ISBN 978-0-7864-2922-6. Archived from the original on 3 January 2022.
- "The Treasure of Sutton Hoo: King's Tomb is Greatest Find in Archaeology of England". Life. Vol. 31, no. 3. New York. 16 July 1951. pp. 82–85.
- Treasures from the World's Cultures: The British Museum after 250 Years. Tokyo: The Asahi Shimbun. 2003.
- Underwood, Richard (1999). Anglo-Saxon Weapons & Warfare. Gloucestershire: Tempus. ISBN 07524-1412-7.
- van der Heide, Martijn. "Valhalla". World of Spectrum. Archived from the original on 9 November 2016.
- "Valhalla". Sinclair User. No. 19. London: ECC Publications. October 1983. pp. 34–35.
- Van Geersdaele, Peter C. (November 1969). "Moulding the Impression of the Sutton Hoo Ship". Studies in Conservation. 14 (4): 177–182. doi:10.1179/sic.1969.021. JSTOR 1505343.
- Van Geersdaele, Peter C. (August 1970). "Making the Fibre Glass Replica of the Sutton Hoo Ship Impression". Studies in Conservation. 15 (3): 215–220. doi:10.2307/1505584. JSTOR 1505584.
- Vollrath-Reichelt, Hanna (1971). Königsgedanke und Königtum bei den Angelsachsen: Bis zur Mitte des 9. Jahrhunderts. Kölner historische Abhandlungen (in German). Vol. 19. Cologne: Böhlau Verlag. ISBN 3-412-61871-3.
- Wallace-Hadrill, J. M. (1971). Early Germanic Kingship in England and on the Continent: The Ford Lectures Delivered in the University of Oxford in Hilary Term 1970. Oxford: The Clarendon Press. ISBN 0-19-821491-X.
- Wallace-Hadrill, J. M. (1960). "The Graves of Kings: An Historical Note on some Archaeological Evidence". Studi Medievali. 3rd (1): 177–194.
  - Edited and republished as Wallace-Hadrill, J. M. (1975). "The Graves of Kings: An Historical Note on some Archaeological Evidence". Early Medieval History. Oxford: Basil Blackwell. pp. 39–59. ISBN 0-631-16520-7.
- Wallace-Hadrill, J. M. (1988). Bede's Ecclesiastical History of the English People: A Historical Commentary. Oxford: The Clarendon Press. ISBN 0-19-822269-6.
- Ward, Gordon (March 1952). "The Silver Spoons from Sutton Hoo". Antiquity. XXVI (101): 9–13. doi:10.1017/S0003598X00021244. S2CID 163007448.
- Webster, Leslie (1998). "Archaeology and Beowulf". In Mitchell, Bruce & Robinson, Fred C. (eds.). Beowulf: An Edition with Relevant Shorter Texts. Oxford: Blackwell. pp. 183–194. ISBN 0-631-17225-4.
  - Republished in Donoghue 2002, pp. 212–223
- Weetch, Rosie [@rosieweetch] (17 December 2014). "Rosie Weetch on Twitter: "Is that the Sutton Hoo helmet in the Night at the Museum 3 trailer? Spotted by @ellie__miles https://t.co/nR00ZZAlvS http://t.co/00M0prHNLV" / Twitter" (Tweet) – via Twitter.
- Whitelock, Dorothy (1958). The Audience of Beowulf (corrected ed.). Oxford: The Clarendon Press.
- Williams, Howard (2022). "Destroy the 'Sutton Hoo Treasure'!". In Williams, Howard; Reavill, Peter & Clague, Samuel (eds.). The Public Archaeology of Treasure. Oxford: Archaeopress. pp. 162–185. ISBN 978-1-80327-310-5. Archived from the original on 28 November 2022.
- Williams, Nigel (1992). "The Sutton Hoo Helmet". In Oddy, William Andrew (ed.). The Art of the Conservator. London: British Museum Press. pp. 73–88. ISBN 0-7141-2056-1.
- Williams, Nigel (1989). The Breaking and Remaking of the Portland Vase. London: British Museum Publications. ISBN 0-7141-1291-7.
- Wilson, David M. (1983). "Sweden – England". In Lamm, Jan Peder & Nordstrom, Hans-Åke (eds.). Vendel Period Studies: transactions of the Boat-Grave Symposium in Stockholm, February 2–3, 1981. Studies – The Museum of National Antiquities, Stockholm. Vol. 2. Stockholm: Statens Historiska Museum. pp. 163–166. ISBN 91-7192-547-3.
- Wilson, David M. (1992). "Sutton Hoo – Pros and Cons". In Farrell, Robert & Neuman de Vegvar, Carol (eds.). Sutton Hoo: Fifty Years After. American Early Medieval Studies. Vol. 2. Oxford, Ohio: Miami University. pp. 5–12. ISBN 1-879836-01-7.
  - ISBN incorrectly printed as ISBN 1-879836-02-7
- Wood, Ian N. (1983). The Merovingian North Sea. Occasional papers on medieval topics. Vol. 1. Alingsås, Sweden: Viktoria Bokförlag. OCLC 976731713.
- Wormald, Patrick (1983). "Bede, the Bretwaldas and the Origins of the Gens Anglorum". In Wormald, Patrick; Bullough, Donald & Collins, Roger (eds.). Ideal and Reality in Frankish and Anglo-Saxon Society: Studies Presented to J.M. Wallace-Hadrill. Oxford: Basil Blackwell. pp. 99–129. ISBN 0-631-12661-9.
  - Edited and republished as Wormald, Patrick (2006). "Bede, the Bretwaldas and the Origins of the Gens Anglorum". In Baxter, Stephen (ed.). The Times of Bede: Studies in Early English Christian Society and its Historian. Malden, MA: Blackwell Publishing. pp. 106–134. doi:10.1002/9780470693377.ch3. ISBN 978-0-631-16655-9.
- Wrenn, Charles Leslie (1959). "Sutton Hoo and Beowulf". Mélanges de Linguistique et de Philologie: Fernand Mossé in Memoriam. Paris: Didier. pp. 495–507. OCLC 4049783.

- Republished as Wrenn, Charles Leslie (1963). "Sutton Hoo and Beowulf". In Nicholson, Lewis E. (ed.). An Anthology of Beowulf Criticism. Notre Dame, Indiana: University of Notre Dame Press. pp. 311–330. ISBN 9780268000066.

- "250th Anniversary of the British Museum". CollectGBStamps. Archived from the original on 3 January 2022.

=== Other helmets ===
==== Anglo-Saxon ====
===== Benty Grange =====
- Bateman, Thomas (1861). "Benty Grange Near Monyash". Ten Years' Digging in Celtic and Saxon Grave Hills, in the counties of Derby, Stafford, and York, from 1848 to 1858; with notices of some former discoveries, hitherto unpublished, and remarks on the crania and pottery from the mounds. London: John Russell Smith. pp. 28–33.
- Lester, Geoff (Fall 1987). "The Anglo-Saxon Helmet from Benty Grange, Derbyshire" (PDF). Old English Newsletter. 21 (1): 34–35. ISSN 0030-1973.
- See also Bruce-Mitford 1974a, ch. 11

===== Coppergate =====
- Addyman, Peter V. (28 August 1982). "The Coppergate Helmet". Archaeology. The Illustrated London News. Vol. 270, no. 7, 009. p. 53.
- Addyman, Peter V.; Pearson, Nicholas & Tweddle, Dominic (November 1982). "The Coppergate helmet". Antiquity. LVI (218): 189–194. doi:10.1017/S0003598X00054673. S2CID 54050677.
- Binns, James W.; Norton, Edward C. & Palliser, David M. (March 1990). "The Latin inscription on the Coppergate helmet". Antiquity. 64 (242): 134–139. doi:10.1017/S0003598X00077383.
- Tweddle, Dominic (1983a). "The Coppergate Helmet" (PDF). Fornvännen [The Friend of the Past]. 78: 105–112. ISSN 0015-7813. Archived (PDF) from the original on 17 December 2021.
- Tweddle, Dominic (1983b). "The Coppergate helmet – a recent find in York". In Lamm, Jan Peder & Nordstrom, Hans-Åke (eds.). Vendel Period Studies: transactions of the Boat-Grave Symposium in Stockholm, February 2–3, 1981. Studies – The Museum of National Antiquities, Stockholm. Vol. 2. Stockholm: Statens Historiska Museum. pp. 190–191. ISBN 91-7192-547-3.
- Tweddle, Dominic (1984). The Coppergate Helmet. York: Cultural Resource Management Ltd. OCLC 613146338.
- Tweddle, Dominic (1992). The Anglian Helmet from 16–22 Coppergate. The Archaeology of York. Vol. 17/8. London: Council for British Archaeology. ISBN 1-872414-19-2. Archived from the original on 21 March 2024.

===== Shorwell =====
- Hood, Jamie; Ager, Barry; Williams, Craig; Harrington, Susan & Cartwright, Caroline (2012). "Investigating and interpreting an early-to-mid sixth-century Frankish style helmet". The British Museum Technical Research Bulletin. 6. British Museum: 83–95. ISBN 978-1-904982-80-7.

===== Staffordshire =====
- Butterworth, Jenni; Fregni, Giovanna; Fuller, Kayleigh & Greaves, Pieta (2016). "The importance of multidisciplinary work within archaeological conservation projects: assembly of the Staffordshire Hoard die-impressed sheets". Journal of the Institute of Conservation. 39 (1). Institute of Conservation: 29–43. doi:10.1080/19455224.2016.1155071.
- Fern, Chris & Speake, George (2014). Beasts, Birds and Gods: Interpreting the Staffordshire Hoard. Warwickshire: West Midlands History. ISBN 978-1-905036-20-2.
- Magnoler, Deborah L. (3 November 2011). "K453 and the 'Cheek piece' Group". Staffordshire Hoard. Archived from the original on 2 November 2017.
- Pilkington, Andrew (19 October 2012). "The Staffordshire Hoard Horseman Helmet Foil". Staffordshire Hoard. Archived from the original on 12 August 2017.

===== Wollaston =====
- Meadows, Ian (1996–1997). "The Pioneer Helmet". Northamptonshire Archaeology. 27. Northamptonshire Archaeological Society: 191–193.
- Meadows, Ian (September 1997a). "Wollaston: The 'Pioneer' Burial". Current Archaeology. 13 (154). Current Publishing: 391–395. ISSN 0011-3212.
- Meadows, Ian (Autumn–Winter 1997b). "The Pioneer Helmet: A Dark-Age Princely Burial from Northamptonshire". Medieval Life (8). Medieval Life Publications: 2–4. ISSN 1357-6291.
- Meadows, Ian (March 2004). "An Anglian Warrior Burial from Wollaston, Northamptonshire". Northamptonshire Archaeology Reports. 10 (110) (2010 digital ed.). Northamptonshire County Council.
- Read, Anthony (2006). "The conservation of the Wollaston Anglian helmet". In Smith, Robert Douglas (ed.). Make all sure: The conservation and restoration of arms and armour. Leeds: Basiliscoe Press. pp. 38–43. ISBN 0-9551622-0-3.
- Saraceni, Jessica E. (November–December 1997). "Saxon Helmet Restored". Newsbriefs. Archaeology. 50 (6). Archaeological Institute of America: 18. ISSN 0003-8113.
- Webster, Leslie & Meadows, Ian (July–August 1997). "Discovery of Anglo-Saxon Helmet helmet with Boar Crest". Minerva. 8 (4): 3–5.

===== Other =====
- "Asthall Barrow – an Anglo-Saxon Burial". Archives & Artefacts: Exploring the Past through the Work of E.T. Leeds and A2A. Ashmolean Museum. 22 December 2005.
- Dickinson, Tania M. & Speake, George (1992). "The Seventh-Century Cremation Burial in Asthall Barrow, Oxfordshire: A Reassessment". In Carver, Martin (ed.). The Age of Sutton Hoo: The Seventh Century in North-Western Europe. Woodbridge: The Boydell Press. pp. 95–130. ISBN 0-85115-330-5.
- Evans, Angela Care (October 2004). "Horncastle, Lincolnshire: Anglo-Saxon parcel-gilt terminal in the form of a boar's head (2002 T119) (fig. 41)" (PDF). Treasure Annual Report 2002. Department for Culture, Media and Sport. pp. 53–54.
- Fordham, Herbert George (1904). "A Small Bronze Object Found near Guilden Morden" (PDF). Proceedings of the Cambridge Antiquarian Society. X (4). Cambridge Antiquarian Society: 373–374, 404.
- Foster, Jennifer (1977a). "Notes and News: A boar figurine from Guilden Morden, Cambs" (PDF). Medieval Archaeology. XXI. Society for Medieval Archaeology: 166–167. doi:10.5284/1000320.
- "helmet / figurine". Collection Online. British Museum.
- Jarvis, Edwin (1850). "Account of the Discovery of Ornaments and Remains, Supposed to be of Danish Origin, in the Parish of Caenby, Lincolnshire" (PDF). The Archaeological Journal. VII. London: The Archaeological Institute of Great Britain and Ireland: 36–44. doi:10.1080/00665983.1850.10850769.
- Leeds, E. Thurlow (April 1924). "An Anglo-Saxon Cremation-burial of the Seventh Century in Asthall Barrow, Oxfordshire". The Antiquaries Journal. IV (2). Society of Antiquaries of London: 113–126. doi:10.1017/S0003581500005552. S2CID 161746919.
- MacGregor, Arthur & Bolick, Ellen (1993). "A Summary Catalogue of the Anglo-Saxon Collections (Non-Ferrous Metals)". British Archaeological Reports. 230. ISBN 978-0860547518.
- "mount". The British Museum. British Museum. Archived from the original on 15 December 2021.
- "Record ID: PAS-5D5B56 – Early Medieval helmet". Portable Antiquities Scheme. 16 August 2012.

==== Scandinavian ====
===== Gamla Uppsala =====
- Arrhenius, Birgit & Freij, Henry (1992). "'Pressbleck' Fragments from the East Mound in Old Uppsala Analyzed with a Laser Scanner" (PDF). Laborativ Arkeologi (6). Stockholm University: 75–110.
- Lindqvist, Sune (1936). Uppsala högar och Ottarshögen (in Swedish). Stockholm: Wahlström & Widstrand.

===== Gotland =====
- Nerman, Birger (1969a). Die Vendelzeit Gotlands (II): Tafeln. Monographien Herausgegehen von der Kungliga Vitterhets Historie och Antikvitets Akademien (in German). Vol. 48. Stockholm: Almqvist & Wiksell.
- Nerman, Birger (1969b). Die Vendelzeit Gotlands: Provisorisches Verzeichnis der Tafelfiguren (in German). Stockholm: Almqvist & Wiksell.
- Nerman, Birger (1975). Die Vendelzeit Gotlands (I:1): Text. Monographien Herausgegehen von der Kungliga Vitterhets Historie och Antikvitets Akademien (in German). Vol. 55. Stockholm: Almqvist & Wiksell. ISBN 91-7402-016-1.
- "Statens Historiska Museum och k. Myntkabinettet: Tilväxten år 1904". Månadsblad: 1903–1905 (in Swedish). 31–34. Royal Swedish Academy of Letters, History and Antiquities: 126–189. 1907.
- Thunmark-Nylén, Lena (1995). Die Wikingerzeit Gotlands (I): Abbildungen der grabfunde (in German). Stockholm: Almqvist & Wiksell. ISBN 91-7402-241-5.
- Thunmark-Nylén, Lena (1998). Die Wikingerzeit Gotlands (II): Typentafeln (in German). Stockholm: Almqvist & Wiksell. ISBN 91-7402-287-3.
- Thunmark-Nylén, Lena (2000a). Die Wikingerzeit Gotlands (IV:1): Katalog (in German). Stockholm: Almqvist & Wiksell. ISBN 91-7402-307-1.
- Thunmark-Nylén, Lena (2000b). Die Wikingerzeit Gotlands (IV:2): Katalog (in German). Stockholm: Almqvist & Wiksell. ISBN 91-7402-308-X.
- Thunmark-Nylén, Lena (2000c). Die Wikingerzeit Gotlands (IV:3): Katalog (in German). Stockholm: Almqvist & Wiksell. ISBN 91-7402-309-8.
- Thunmark-Nylén, Lena (2006a). Die Wikingerzeit Gotlands (III:1): Text (in German). Stockholm: Almqvist & Wiksell. ISBN 91-7402-354-3.
- Thunmark-Nylén, Lena (2006b). Die Wikingerzeit Gotlands (III:2): Text (in German). Stockholm: Almqvist & Wiksell. ISBN 91-7402-355-1.
- "Ur främmande samlingar: 2" (PDF). Fornvännen [The Friend of the Past] (in Swedish). 2: 205–208. 1907. ISSN 0015-7813. Archived from the original (PDF) on 1 January 2018.

===== Valsgärde =====
- Lindqvist, Sune (1931a). En Hjälm från Valsgärde. Uppsala Universitets Årsskrift (in Swedish). Vol. 3. Uppsala: Almqvist & Wiksell.
- Lindqvist, Sune (1931b). "Båtgravarna vid Valsgärde" (PDF). Fornvännen [The Friend of the Past] (in Swedish). 26: 372–377. ISSN 0015-7813. Archived from the original (PDF) on 18 April 2017.
- Lindqvist, Sune (1932). "Vendel-time Finds from Valsgärde in the Neighbourhood of Old Uppsala". Acta Archaeologica. III: 21–46. ISSN 0065-101X.
- Arwidsson, Greta (1934). "A New Scandinavian Form of Helmet from the Vendel-Time". Acta Archaeologica. V: 243–257. ISSN 0065-101X.
- Arwidsson, Greta (1942). Valsgärde 6. Die Gräberfunde von Valsgärde (in German). Vol. I. Uppsala: Almqvist & Wiksells Boktryckeri A.B.
- Arwidsson, Greta (1954). Valsgärde 8. Die Gräberfunde von Valsgärde (in German). Vol. II. Uppsala: Almqvist & Wiksells Boktryckeri A.B.
- Arwidsson, Greta (1977). Valsgärde 7. Die Gräberfunde von Valsgärde (in German). Vol. III. Uppsala: Uppsala universitets museum för nordiska fornsaker. ISBN 91-506-0113-X.
- Arwidsson, Greta (1983). "Valsgärde". In Lamm, Jan Peder & Nordstrom, Hans-Åke (eds.). Vendel Period Studies: transactions of the Boat-Grave Symposium in Stockholm, February 2–3, 1981. Studies – The Museum of National Antiquities, Stockholm. Vol. 2. Stockholm: Statens Historiska Museum. pp. 71–82. ISBN 91-7192-547-3.
- Grimberg, Carl (1985). "Praktgravar från vår yngre järnålder". Supplement till bd I och II. Svenska folkets underbara öden (in Swedish). Vol. X: 1. Stockholm: Norstedt. pp. 85–92. ISBN 91-1-853442-2.

===== Vendel =====
- Lindqvist, Sune (1925). "Vendelhjälmarnas ursprung" (PDF). Fornvännen [The Friend of the Past] (in Swedish). 20: 181–207. ISSN 0015-7813. Archived from the original (PDF) on 22 March 2017.
- Lindqvist, Sune (1950). "Vendelhjälmarna i ny rekonstruktion" (PDF). Fornvännen [The Friend of the Past] (in Swedish). 45: 1–24. ISSN 0015-7813. Archived from the original (PDF) on 22 March 2017.
- Stolpe, Hjalmar & Arne, T. J. (1912). Graffältet vid Vendel (in Swedish). Stockholm: K. L. Beckmans Boktryckeri.
- Stolpe, Hjalmar & Arne, T. J. (1927). La Nécropole De Vendel (in French). Stockholm: Akademiens Förlag.
  - French edition of Stolpe & Arne 1912

===== Other =====
- "Artefacts". Uppåkra: a prehistoric central place in Scania, Sweden. Uppåkra Arkeologiska Center. Archived from the original on 27 April 2016.
- Boye, Vilhelm (1858). "To fund af smedeværktöi fra den sidste hedenske tid i Danmark". Annaler for Nordisk Oldkyndighed og Historie (in Danish): 191–200, pl. II–IV.
- Christensen, Tom (2000). "Et Hjelmfragment fra Gevninge". ROMU: Årsskrift Fra Roskilde Museum (in Danish). 19. Roskilde: Roskilde Museum: 31–38. ISBN 87-88563-50-2. ISSN 0107-928X.
- Christensen, Tom (2002). "Kongens mand – guld og hjelm fra Gevninge". In Pind, John; Jørgensen, Anne Nørgård; Jørgensen, Lars; Storgård, Birger; Rindel, Per Ole & Ilkjær, Jørgen (eds.). Drik – og du vil leve skønt: festskrift til Ulla Lund Hansen på 60-årsdagen 18. august 2002. Studies in Archaeology & History (in Danish). Vol. 7. Copenhagen: National Museum of Denmark. pp. 41–45. ISBN 87-89384-90-3.
- Christensen, Tom (2015). Lejre bag myten : de arkæologiske udgravninger (in Danish). Højbjerg: Jysk Arkæologisk Selskab. ISBN 978-87-88415-96-4.
- "Föremål 1168149. SHM 25518:III (FB:1-3)". Statens Historiska Museum (in Swedish).
- "Hjelmfragment Tjele". Nationalmuseets Samlinger Online (in Danish). National Museum of Denmark. 22 December 2016.
- Gudesen, Hans Gude (1980). Merovingertiden i Øst-Norge: Kronologi, kulturmønstre og tradisjonsforløp. Varia (in Norwegian). Vol. 2. Oslo: Universitetets Oldsaksamling. ISBN 82-7181-016-2.
- "ijzeren German luftwaffe helmet. SSK90/ME262". Nederlandse Munten.
- Grieg, Sigurd (1924). "Norske hjelmer fra folkevandringstiden". Bergens Museums årbok 1922–1923: Historisk-antikvarisk Rekke (in Norwegian) (3): 3–12.
- Grieg, Sigurd (1947). Gjermundbufunnet: En høvdingegrav fra 900-årene fra Ringerike. Norske Oldfunn (in Norwegian). Vol. VIII. Oslo: Bergen.
- Helgesson, Bertil (2004). "Tributes to be Spoken of Sacrifice and Warriors at Uppåkra" (PDF). In Larsson, Lars (ed.). Continuity for Centuries: A ceremonial building and its context at Uppåkra, southern Sweden. Acta Archaeologica Lundensia. Vol. 48. Stockholm: Almqvist & Wiksell International. pp. 223–239. ISBN 91-22-02107-8.
- Kirpichnikov, Anatoliĭ Nikolaevich (1971). "Shlemy". Dospech, Kompleks Boevych Sredstv IX-XIII vv. Drevnerusskoe oruzhie. Vol. 3. Translated by Nagorskiy, Artem. Leningrad: Nauka. LCCN 72324869. Archived from the original on 29 April 2017.
- Lamm, Jan Peder (1962). "Ett vendeltida gravfynd från Spelvik" (PDF). Fornvännen [The Friend of the Past] (in Swedish). 57: 277–299. ISSN 0015-7813. Archived from the original (PDF) on 20 April 2017.
- Larsson, Lars (March 2007). "The Iron Age ritual building at Uppåkra, southern Sweden". Antiquity. 81 (311): 11–25. doi:10.1017/S0003598X00094813. S2CID 162024379.
- Larsson, Lars (2011). "A ceremonial building as a 'home of the gods'? Central buildings in the central place of Uppåkra" (PDF). In Grimm, Oliver & Pesch, Alexandra (eds.). The Gudme-Gudhem phenomenon: papers presented at a workshop organized by the Centre for Baltic and Scandinavian Archaeology (ZBSA), Schleswig, April 26th and 27th, 2010. Schriften des Archäologischen Landesmuseums. Vol. 6. Neumünster: Wachholtz Verlag. pp. 189–206. ISBN 978-3-529-01876-3.
- Leth-Larsen, Bodil (1984). "Selected Objects from the Stock of the Tjele Smith". Offa. 41: 91–96. ISSN 0078-3714.
- Lund, Julie (2006). "Vikingetidens værktøjskister i landskab og mytologi" (PDF). Fornvännen [The Friend of the Past] (in Danish). 101 (5): 323–341. ISSN 0015-7813. Archived from the original (PDF) on 26 November 2018.
- Munksgaard, Elisabeth (1984). "A Viking Age Smith, his Tools and his Stock-in-trade". Offa. 41: 85–89. ISSN 0078-3714.
- Myhre, Bjørn (1992). "The Royal Cemetery at Borre, Vestfold: A Norwegian Centre in a European Periphery". In Carver, Martin (ed.). The Age of Sutton Hoo: The Seventh Century in North-Western Europe. Woodbridge: The Boydell Press. pp. 301–313. ISBN 0-85115-330-5.
- Nerman, Birger (1953). "Ett hjälmfragment, sannolikt från mellersta Sverige" (PDF). Fornvännen [The Friend of the Past] (in Swedish). 48: 123–124. ISSN 0015-7813. Archived from the original (PDF) on 15 April 2017.
- Nicolaysen, Nicolay (1882). "Udgravninger i Løiten 1881". Aarsberetning for 1881 (in Norwegian). Foreningen til Norske Fortidsmindesmerkers Bevaring: 68–80.
- Ohlhaver, Horst (1939). Der germanische Schmied und sein Werkzeug. Hamburger Schriften zur Vorgeschichte und germanischen Frühgeschichte (in German). Vol. 2. Leipzig: Curt Kabitzsch.
- Seiler, Anton (31 May 2011). "En vendeltida tuffing – eller konsten att se cool ut på 700-talet". Arkeologernas blogg (in Swedish). Arkeologerna.
- Seiler, Anton & Appelgren, Katarina (2012). "Inhåleskullen – ett mångtydigt gravfält från yngre bronsålder-äldre vikingatid". Arkeologiska Uppdragsverksamheten (UV) Rapporter (in Swedish). 2012 (158). Stockholm: Riksantikvarieämbetet.
- Sjösvärd, Lars; Vretemark, Maria & Gustavson, Helmer (1983). "A Vendel warrior from Vallentuna". In Lamm, Jan Peder & Nordstrom, Hans-Åke (eds.). Vendel Period Studies: transactions of the Boat-Grave Symposium in Stockholm, February 2–3, 1981. Studies – The Museum of National Antiquities, Stockholm. Vol. 2. Stockholm: Statens Historiska Museum. pp. 133–150. ISBN 91-7192-547-3.
- Stjernquist, Berta (2004). "A Magnificent Glass Bowl from Uppåkra" (PDF). In Larsson, Lars (ed.). Continuity for Centuries: A ceremonial building and its context at Uppåkra, southern Sweden. Acta Archaeologica Lundensia. Vol. 48. Stockholm: Almqvist & Wiksell International. pp. 103–151. ISBN 91-22-02107-8.
- Strong, Doug (12 July 2002). "Not A 10th Century Scandinavian Helmet". Talbot's Fine Accessories.

==== Roman ====
- Engelhardt, Conrad (1863). Thorsbjerg Mosefund: beskrivelse af de oldsager som i aarene 1858–61 ere udgravede af Thorsbjerg Mose ved Sønder-Brarup i Angel. Sønderjydske Mosefund (in Danish). Vol. I. Copenhagen: G. E. C. Gad.
- "helmet". Collection Online. British Museum.
- "helmet". Collection Online. British Museum.
- James, Simon (1986). "Evidence from Dura Europos for the Origins of Late Roman Helmets". Syria. LXIII (1–2). Institut français d'archéologie du Proche-Orient: 107–134. doi:10.3406/syria.1986.6923. JSTOR 4198539.
- Johnson, Stephen (1980). "A Late Roman Helmet from Burgh Castle". Britannia. XI. London: Society for the Promotion of Roman Studies: 303–312. doi:10.2307/525684. JSTOR 525684. S2CID 162243671.
- Kaminski, Jaime & Sim, David (2014). "The production and deposition of the Witcham Gravel Helmet" (PDF). Proceedings of the Cambridge Antiquarian Society. CIII. Cambridge Antiquarian Society: 69–82.
- Klumbach, Hans, ed. (1973). Spatromische Gardehelme. Münchner Beiträge zur Vor- und Frügeschichte (in German). Vol. 15. Munich: C. H. Beck'sche. ISBN 3-406-00485-7.
- Manojlović-Marijanski, Mirjana (1964). Rašajski, Rastko (ed.). Kasnorimski Šlemovi iz Berkasova. Vojvođanski Muzej Posebna Izdanja (in Serbian). Vol. III. Novi Sad: Vojvođanski Muzej.
  - Published in one volume with two titles, with Serbian and French text side by side. French bibliographic information: Manojlović-Marijanski, Mirjana (1964). Rašajski, Rastko (ed.). Les Casques Romains Tardifs de Berkasovo. Vojvođanski Muzej Monographie (in French). Vol. III. Novi Sad: Musée de Voïvodine.
- Plenderleith, H. J. (1956). The Conservation of Antiquities and Works of Art: Treatment, Repair, and Restoration. London: Oxford University Press.
- Robinson, H. Russell (1975). The Armour of Imperial Rome. New York: Charles Scribner's Sons. ISBN 0-684-13956-1.
- Seyrig, Henri (June 1952a). "A Helmet from Emisa". Archaeology. 5 (2). Archaeological Institute of America: 66–69. JSTOR 41663047.
- Seyrig, Henri (1952b). "Le Casque d'Émèse". Les Annales Archéologiques de Syrie (in French). II (1–2). Direction Générale des Antiquités de Syrie: 101–108.

Preceded by 46: Gold coins of Abd al-Malik	A History of the World in 100 Objects; Object 47	Succeeded by 48: Moche warrior pot
