= Horncastle boar's head =

7th-century Anglo-Saxon ornament depicting a boar

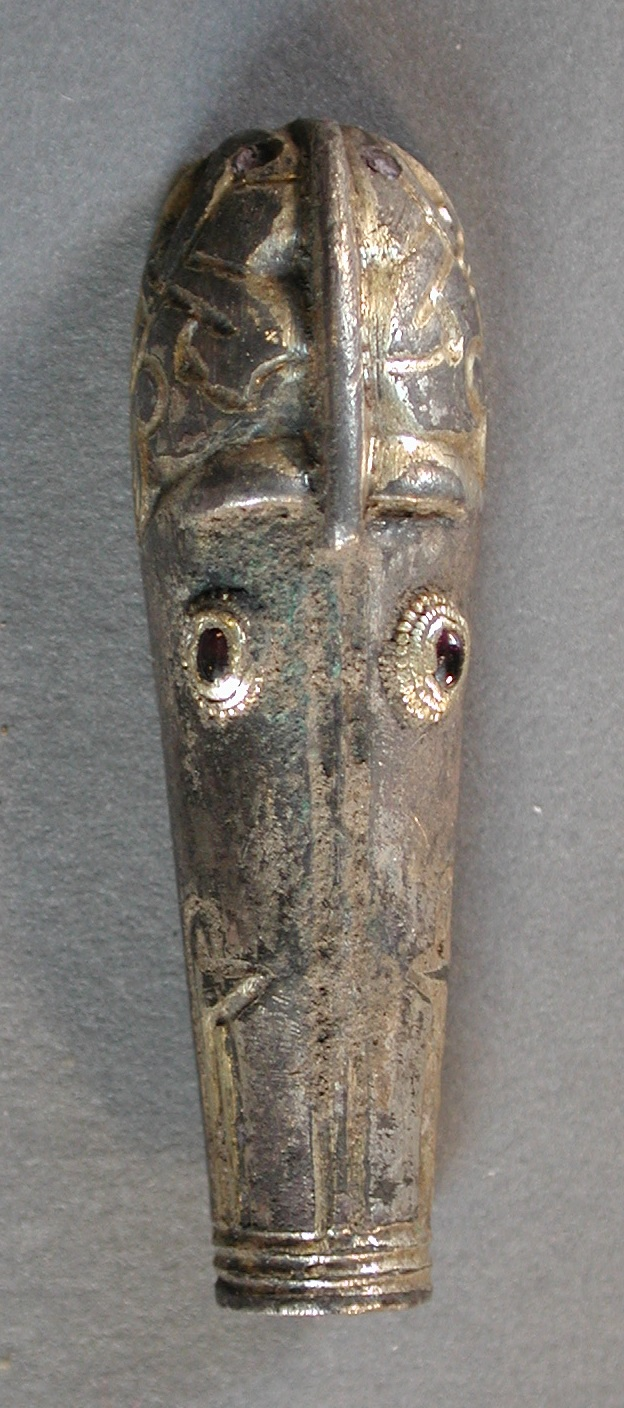
- Material: Silver, gold, garnets
- Created: c. 600–650 AD
- Discovered: 2002; Horncastle
- Present location: Lincoln Museum, Lincoln

The Horncastle boar's head is an early seventh-century Anglo-Saxon ornament depicting a boar that probably was once part of the crest of a helmet. It was discovered in 2002 by a metal detectorist searching in the town of Horncastle, Lincolnshire. It was reported as found treasure and acquired for £15,000 by the Lincoln City and County Museum—now Lincoln Museum—where it is on permanent display.

The fragment is 40 mm (1.6 in) long and made of silver. Its elongated head is semi-naturalistic, depicting a crouching quadruped on either side of the skull, divided by a mane along the centre. The boar's eyes are formed from garnet, and its eyebrows, skull, mouth, tusks, and snout are gilded. Its head is hollow; in the space underneath, which was filled with soil and plant matter when found, are three rivets that would have attached it to a larger object, probably a helmet. The fragment would probably have formed the crest terminal of one of the "crested helmets" used in Northern Europe during the sixth through eleventh centuries.

The boar's head terminal is one of several representations of the animal on contemporaneous helmets. Boars surmount the Benty Grange and Wollaston helmets, and form the ends of the eyebrows of the Sutton Hoo and perhaps York helmets. These evidence a thousand-years-long tradition in Germanic paganism associating boars with both deities and protection. The Roman historian Tacitus suggested that the Baltic Aesti wore boar symbols in battle to invoke the protection of a mother goddess, and in the Anglo-Saxon epic Beowulf, the poet writes that boar symbols on helmets kept watch over the warriors wearing them.

== Description ==
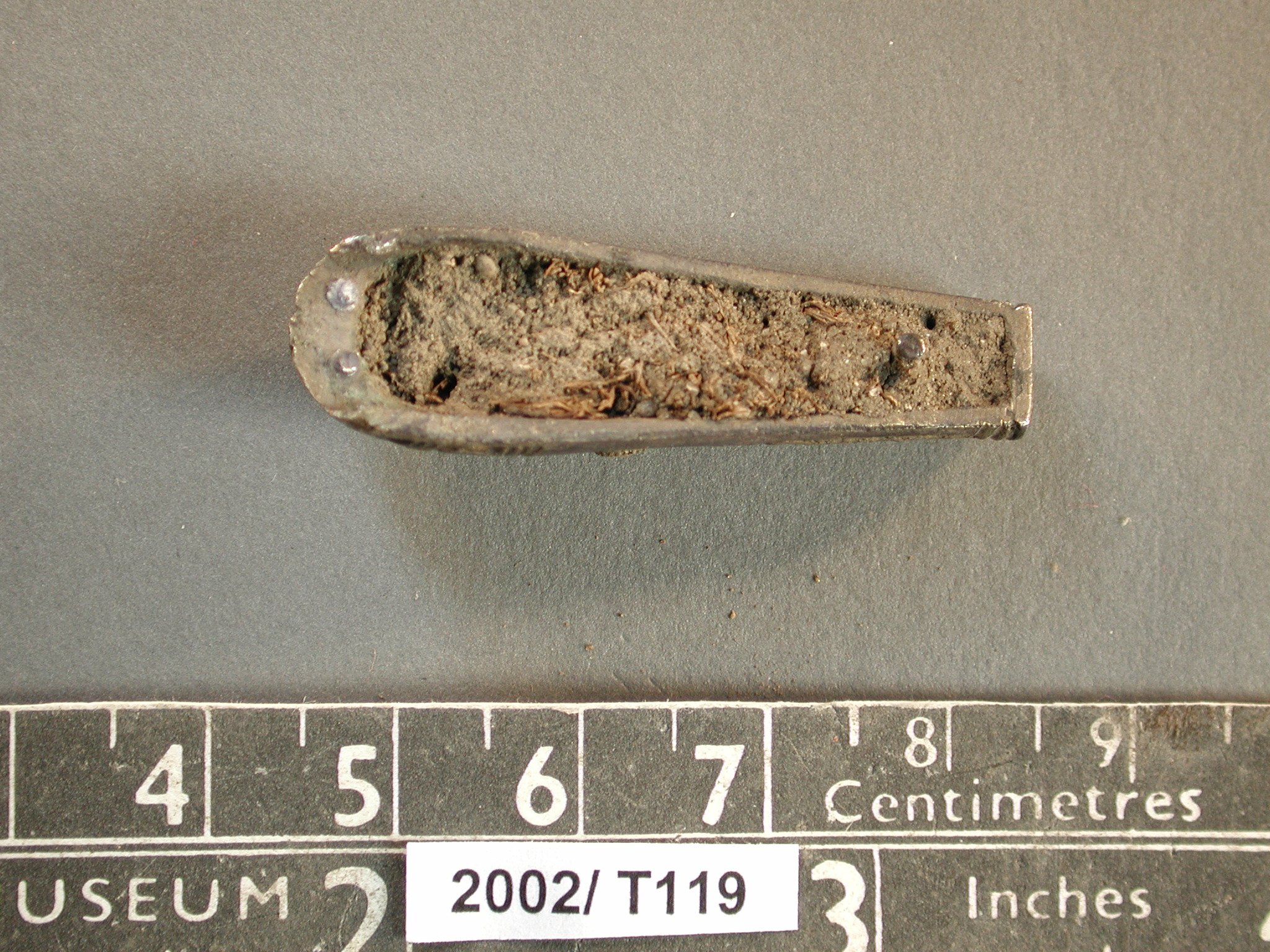
The bottom of the fragment, showing three rivets and still filled with dirt

The fragment represents a boar's head. It is hollow, with a shell made of silver, parts of which are gilded, and has garnet eyes. The fragment is 40 mm (1.6 in) long, and semi-naturalistic in style. The head is elongated, capped by a prominent mane dividing the skull, and terminates in a blunt snout, defined by three grooved and gilded lines. On each side above the snout are more grooved and gilded lines representing the mouth, which includes pointed tusks. The boar's two small eyes are formed with lentoid cabochon garnets, set in beaded gold filigree work with a double collar. Two gilded eyebrows, cast in relief, are well clear of the eyes and set against the skull. This is also gilded, and repeats on either side the pattern of a crouching quadruped. The figure's head is twisted backwards, its jaws biting across its body and back foot, which, like the front foot, has three toes.

When the fragment was found it was filled with soil and plant roots. Three rivets on the underside—one near the mouth, two at the opposite end—would have served to attach it to a larger object, most likely a helmet.

== Discovery ==
The fragment was found on 1 May 2002 in Horncastle, a market town in Lincolnshire, England. It was discovered by a Mr D. Turner, who was searching with a metal detector. As required for found objects more than 300 years old and with more than a 10% silver content, it was reported under the Treasure Act 1996, and subsequently declared treasure. Valued at £15,000, it was purchased by the City and County Museum, Lincoln—subsequently known as The Collection, and now as Lincoln Museum.

The acquisition was funded by the Art Fund, the MLA/V&A Purchase Grant Fund, Friends of Lincoln Museum & Art Gallery, and the Lincolnshire County Council Heritage Service Purchase Fund. As of 2024, the fragment is on display at Lincoln Museum alongside a variety of Anglo-Saxon grave goods.

== Typology ==
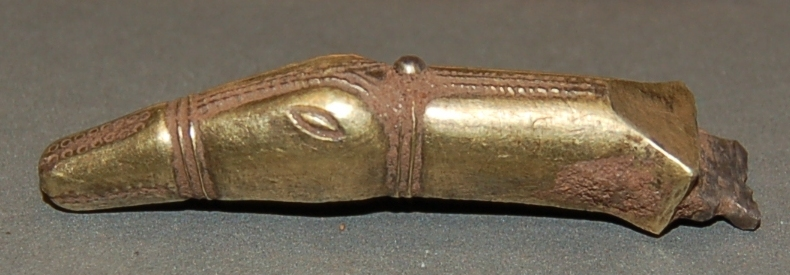
Horse-head terminal from the Staffordshire helmet

The boar is of Anglo-Saxon origin, and dates from the first half of the seventh century AD. Although its original purpose cannot be conclusively determined, the style and size of the boar suggests that it formed the terminal of a helmet crest. Figural terminals adorn the crests of many contemporaneous helmets, such as the Sutton Hoo helmet, which has a dragon terminal at either end, and the one from Staffordshire, which features a horse-head terminal. Boar iconography is also found on helmets from the period, typically on the crests, as with the Benty Grange, Wolaston and Guilden Morden examples, or at the ends of the eyebrows, as on those from Sutton Hoo and perhaps York. (Note: The eyebrow terminals on the Sutton Hoo helmet are clearly boars, but less clearly on the York helmet, where the teeth are more similar to those of canines. The York helmet is more recent, dating to the eighth century, and more overtly Christian; the stylistic differences perhaps reflect an invocation of an earlier pagan tradition, or conversely a repudiation of one.) The Horncastle fragment, with its lentoid eyes, tusks, and defined mane, is stylistically similar to the boar atop the Benty Grange helmet.

Taken in context, the boar would probably have adorned an early model of the "crested helmets" known in Northern Europe in the sixth through eleventh centuries AD. Such helmets are characterised by a rounded cap and usually a prominent nose-to-nape crest, from which the name of the helmet type derives and at one end of which the Horncastle boar was probably once attached.

== Iconography ==
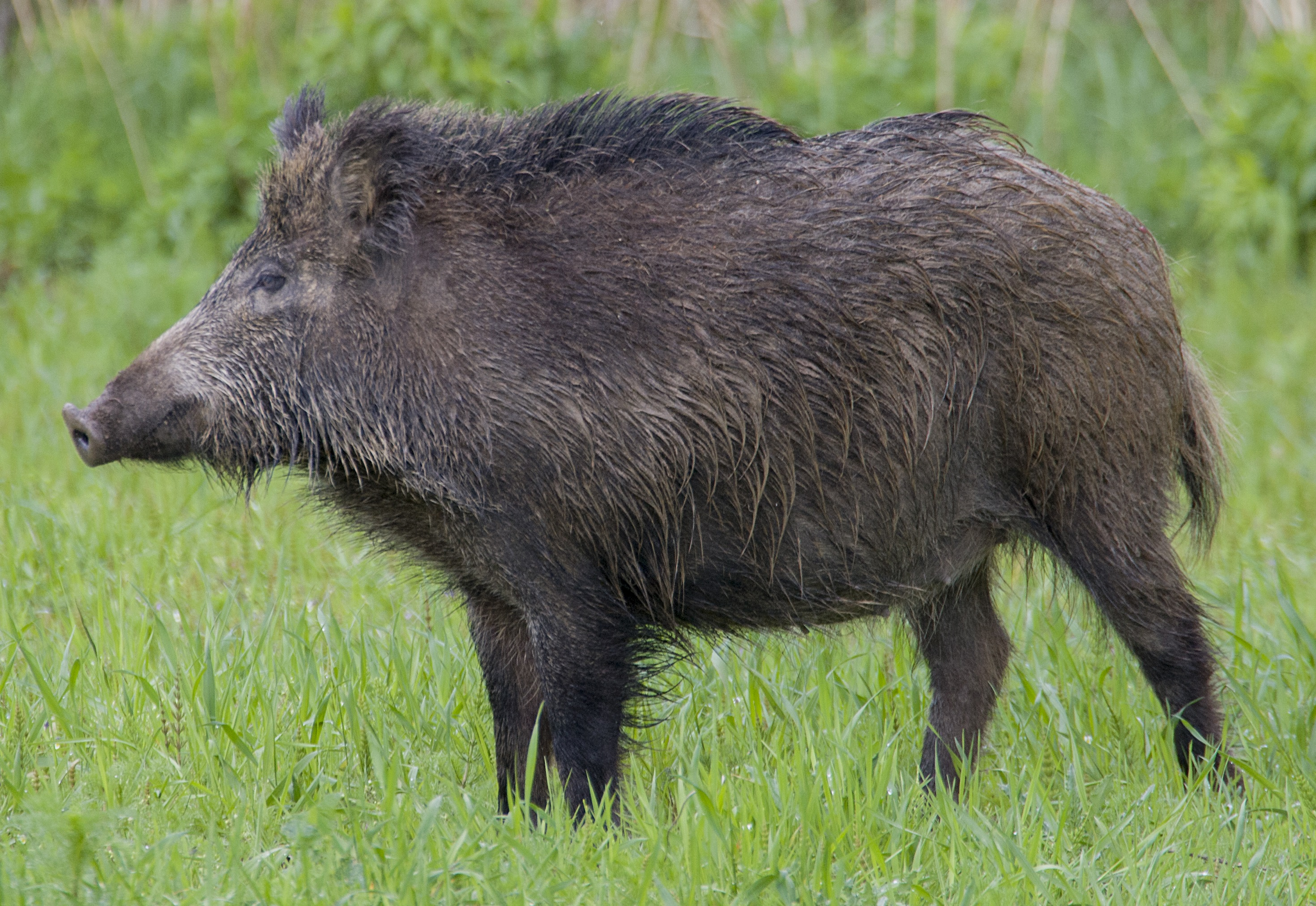
A Central European boar

The boar was an important symbol in prehistoric Europe, where, according to the archaeologist Jennifer Foster, it was "venerated, eulogised, hunted and eaten ... for millennia, until its virtual extinction in recent historical time." Anglo-Saxon boar symbols follow a thousand years of similar iconography, coming after La Tène examples in the fourth century BC, Gaulish examples three centuries later, and Roman boars in the fourth century AD. They probably represent a fused tradition of European and Mediterranean cultures. The boar is said to have been sacred to a mother goddess figure among linguistically Celtic communities in Iron Age Europe, while the Roman historian Tacitus, writing around the first century AD, suggested that the Baltic Aesti wore boar symbols in battle to invoke her protection.

Boar-crested helmets are depicted on the turn-of-the-millennium Gundestrup cauldron, discovered in Denmark, and on a Torslunda plate from Sweden, made some five hundred years later. Though the Romans also included the boar in their stable of symbols—four legions, including the England-based twentieth, adopted it as their emblem—it was only one among many. The boar persisted in continental Germanic tradition during the nearly 400 years of Roman rule in Britain, such as in association with the Scandinavian gods Freyja and Freyr. Its return to prominence in the Anglo-Saxon period, as represented by the boars from Benty Grange, Wollaston, Guilden Morden, and Horncastle, may therefore suggest the post-Roman introduction of a Germanic tradition from Europe, rather than the continuation of a tradition in Britain through 400 years of Roman rule. Whatever its precise symbolism, the Anglo-Saxon boar appears to have been associated with protection; the Beowulf poet makes this clear, writing that boar symbols on helmets kept watch over the warriors wearing them.

== Bibliography ==
- "Anglo Saxon grave goods". Lincoln Museum. Archived from the original on 28 May 2024.
- Beowulf. n.d.

- Old English available in the Klaeber text, published as Klaeber, Friedrich (1922). Beowulf and The Fight at Finnsburg. Boston: D.C. Heath & Company.

- Chaney, William A. (1970). The Cult of Kingship in Anglo-Saxon England: The Transition from Paganism to Christianity. Manchester: Manchester University Press. ISBN 0-520-01401-4.
- Evans, Angela C. (October 2004). "Horncastle, Lincolnshire: Anglo-Saxon parcel-gilt terminal in the form of a boar's head (2002 T119) (fig. 41)". Treasure Annual Report 2002 (PDF). Department for Culture, Media and Sport. pp. 53–54.
- Foster, Jennifer (1977a). "Notes and News: A Boar Figurine from Guilden Morden, Cambs" (PDF). Medieval Archaeology. XXI. Society for Medieval Archaeology: 166–167. doi:10.5284/1000320.
  - Images on plate XIV
- Foster, Jennifer (1977b). "Bronze Boar Figurines in Iron Age and Roman Britain". British Archaeological Reports. 39. ISBN 978-0-904531-74-9.
- Frank, Roberta (2008). "The Boar on the Helmet". In Karkov, Catherine E. & Damico, Helen (eds.). Aedificia Nova: Studies in Honor of Rosemary Cramp. Publications of the Richard Rawlinson Center. Kalamazoo: Medieval Institute Publications, Western Michigan University. pp. 76–88. ISBN 978-1-58044-110-0.
- Leahy, Kevin; Bland, Roger; Hooke, Della; Jones, Alex & Okasha, Elisabeth (March 2011). "The Staffordshire (Ogley Hay) Hoard: Recovery of a Treasure". Antiquity. 85 (327): 202–220. doi:10.1017/S0003598X00067545. S2CID 163008014.
- Meadows, Ian (March 2004). "An Anglian Warrior Burial from Wollaston, Northamptonshire". Northamptonshire Archaeology Reports. 10 (110) (2010 digital ed.). Northamptonshire County Council.
- "Record ID: PAS-5D5B56 – Early Medieval helmet". Portable Antiquities Scheme. 16 August 2012.
- Steuer, Heiko (1987). "Helm und Ringschwert: Prunkbewaffnung und Rangabzeichen germanischer Krieger" [Helmet and Ring-Sword: Ornamental Weapons and Insignia of Germanic Warriors]. In Häßler, Hans-Jürgen (ed.). Studien zur Sachsenforschung [Studies in Saxon Research] (in German). Vol. 6. Hildesheim: Lax. pp. 189–236. ISBN 3-7848-1617-7.
- Tacitus (1868). "Germany and its Tribes". The Agricola and Germania of Tacitus. Translated by Church, Alfred John & Brodribb, William Jackson. London: Macmillan.
- Tacitus (1886). "Germania". In Church, Alfred John & Brodribb, William Jackson (eds.). The Agricola and Germania of Tacitus: With a Revised Text, English Notes, and Maps. London: Macmillan.
- "Terminal in the form of a boar's head". Art Fund. Archived from the original on 28 May 2024.
- Tweddle, Dominic (1992). The Anglian Helmet from 16–22 Coppergate. The Archaeology of York. Vol. 17/8. London: Council for British Archaeology. ISBN 1-872414-19-2. Archived from the original on 21 March 2024.
- "Valuations". Treasure Annual Report 2002 (PDF). Department for Culture, Media and Sport. October 2004. pp. 145–146.
