= Guilden Morden boar =

Anglo-Saxon copper alloy figure of a boar

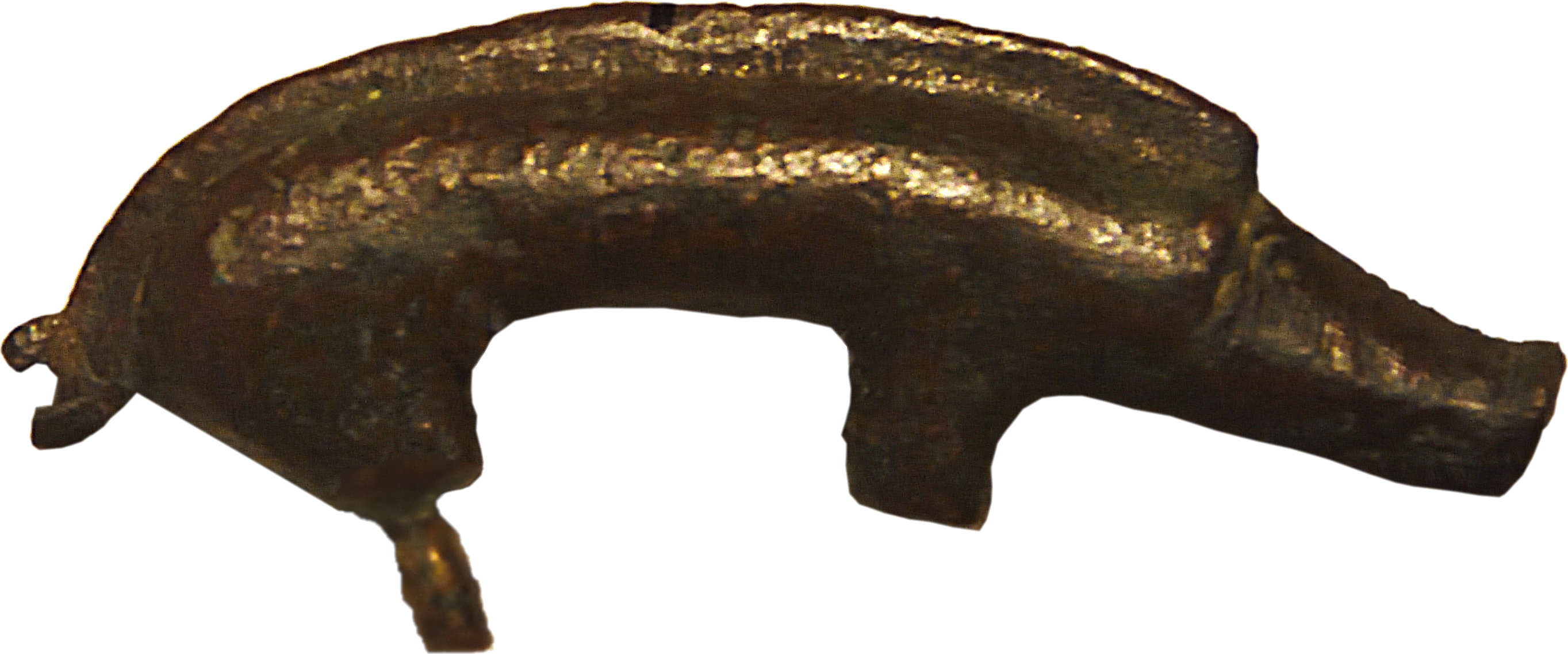
- The Guilden Morden boar

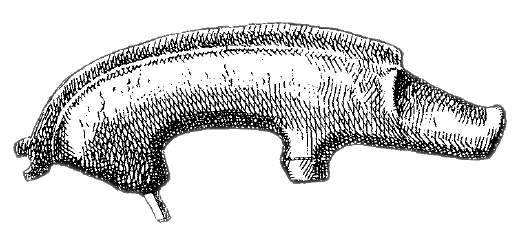
- 1904 drawing of the boar
- Material: Bronze
- Size: 2.5 in × 1 in (6 1/4 cm × 2 1/2 cm)
- Created: c. 500–700 AD
- Discovered: 1864 or 1865; Guilden Morden, England
- Discovered by: Herbert Fordham
- Present location: British Museum
- Registration: 1904,1010.1

The Guilden Morden boar is a sixth- or seventh-century Anglo-Saxon copper alloy figure of a boar that may have once served as the crest of a helmet. It was found around 1864 or 1865 in a grave in Guilden Morden, a village in the eastern English county of Cambridgeshire. There the boar attended a skeleton with other objects, including a small earthenware bead with an incised pattern, although the boar is all that now remains. Herbert George Fordham, whose father originally discovered the boar, donated it to the British Museum in 1904; as of 2018 it was on view in room 41.

The boar is simply designed, distinguished primarily by a prominent mane; eyes, eyebrows, nostrils and tusks are only faintly present. A pin and socket design formed by the front and hind legs suggests that the boar was mounted on another object, such as a helmet. Such is the case on one of the contemporary Torslunda plates found in Sweden, where boar-crested helmets are depicted similarly.

Boar-crested helmets are a staple of Anglo-Saxon imagery, evidence of a Germanic tradition in which the boar invoked the protection of deities. The Guilden Morden boar is one of three—together with the helmets from Benty Grange and Wollaston—known to have survived to the present, and it has been exhibited both domestically and internationally. The Guilden Morden boar recalls a time when such decoration may have been common; in the Anglo-Saxon poem Beowulf, where boar-adorned helmets are mentioned five times, Hrothgar speaks of when "our boar-crests had to take a battering in the line of action."

== Description ==
The Guilden Morden boar is simply designed and well preserved. Made of cast bronze or copper alloy, it is approximately 64 mm (2.5 in) long and distinguished by little other than a prominent mane. An eye, eyebrows and nostrils leave slight traces and were possibly punched after the boar was cast, while a tusk is indicated on the boar's right side. The tail once formed a full circle but was broken around 1904.

The front two and back two legs were each cast as one piece, yet where a 3.5 mm (0.14 in) deep socket was hollowed into the front piece, a 6 mm (0.24 in) long pin extends down from the back piece. The resultant pin and socket design would allow the boar to be mounted on another object, particularly a helmet.

== Discovery ==
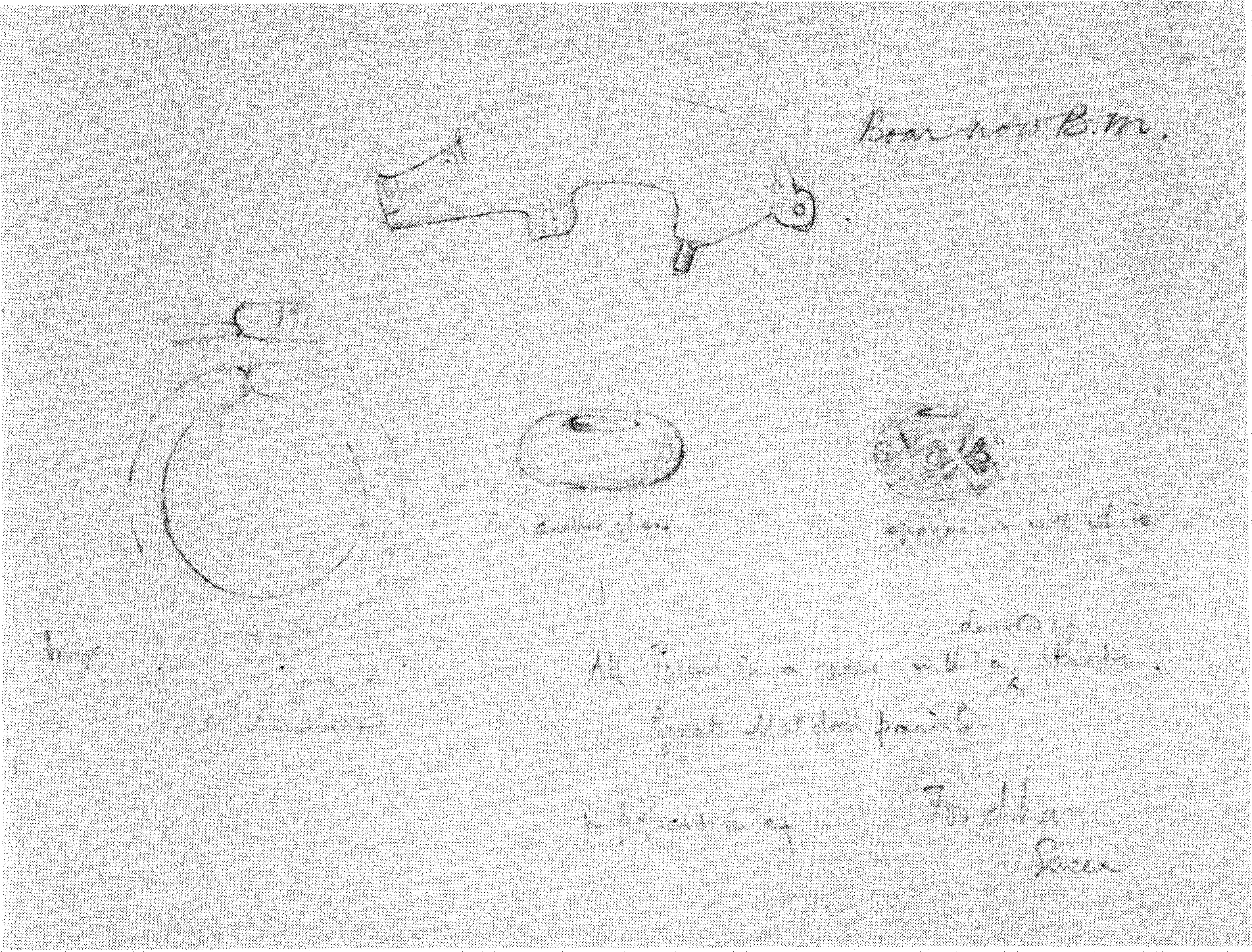
1882–1883 drawing of the Guilden Morden grave goods

The boar was found around 1864 or 1865 in Guilden Morden, a parish in Cambridgeshire about 16 miles (26 km) south west of Cambridge and 5 miles (8 km) west of Royston in Hertfordshire. It was found by Herbert Fordham, co-managing partner at a successful family brewery, while digging for coprolites, a particularly rich phosphate then used as fertiliser and the pursuit of which effectively provided the only employment other than agriculture in Cambridgeshire. Presenting the boar to the Cambridge Antiquarian Society on 3 March 1903, his son Herbert George Fordham suggested that:

I have always understood that it was found in the subsoil, or at no great depth, associated with some other objects, including (at all events) a small earthenware bead bearing incised pattern, the whole group occurring in what was, no doubt, a grave, and so placed with regard to remains of human bones as to suggest that the various objects were originally hung round the neck of the person buried.

A drawing made between April 1882 and September 1883, held by the British Museum, shows the boar alongside a bronze ring and two glass beads, one amber-coloured, the other red with white inlay. (Note: "Unfortunately the name associated with the objects is Great Maldon, rather than Guilden Morden. It is likely that this was merely a mistake in copying, as Guilden Morden was specifically mentioned as the findspot by Fordham. ... Also, despite extensive research, it seems that no settlement named Great Maldon exists, or existed in the 19th century, in any county of England.") Underneath the images it is noted that the items were "all found in a grave with a doubled-up skeleton". Fordham had had no further information about the discovery of the boar, its location or the associated (and now lost) objects, and donated the boar to the British Museum in 1904.

The boar is displayed in Room 41 of the British Museum. The gallery covers Europe from 300 to 1100 AD, and includes objects such as the finds from the Sutton Hoo ship-burial and the Lycurgus Cup. In addition to its place at the British Museum, the Guilden Morden boar has been shown in both domestic and international exhibitions. From 1 April to 30 October 2004, the boar was displayed at the Sutton Hoo Visitor Centre in Suffolk as part of Between Myth and Reality. It was again exhibited from 26 July to 16 October 2013, this time at the Diocesan Museum in Paderborn, Germany, as part of CREDO: Christianisierung Europas im Mittelalter (Christianisation of Medieval Europe).

== Typology ==
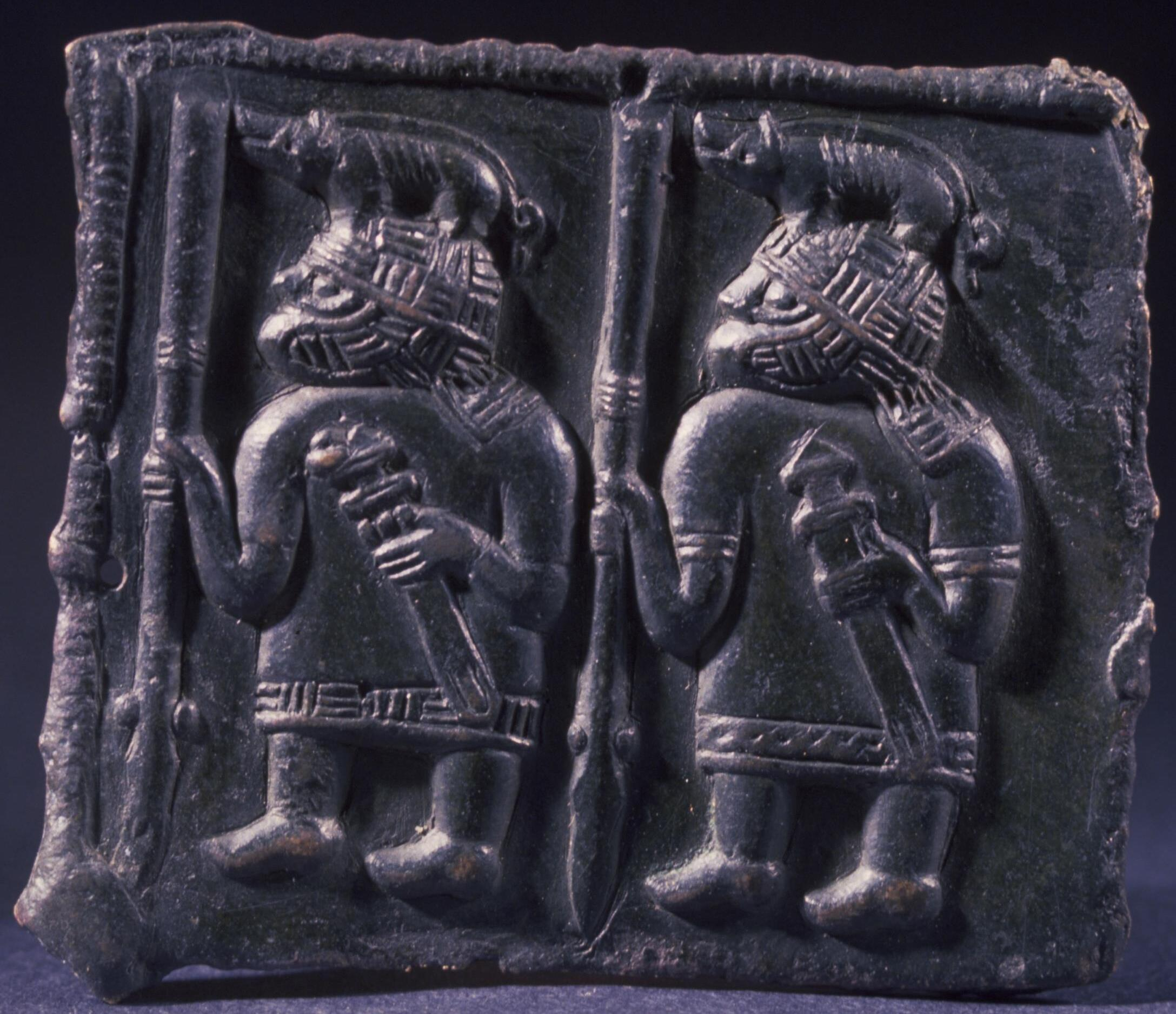
Warriors wearing boar-crested helmets on a Torslunda plate, dated to between the 6th and 8th century CE.

The Guilden Morden boar is of Anglo-Saxon origin, so marked by the additional items found in the grave, and by comparable helmets discovered elsewhere in England, although until 1977 it was misidentified as Celtic. It was likely once mounted atop a boar-crested helmet, a number of which have been either found in archaeological excavations or seen in artistic depictions. Two other boar-crested helmets are known—from Benty Grange and from Wollaston—and the Guilden Morden boar is a close parallel of the boar fixed to the former. The Benty Grange boar has a similar shape; it has a long and distinctive elongated snout projecting forward, a similar stance, and front and hind legs each joined as one. (Note: Rather than the legs being cast individually, the Benty Grange boar was cast in two longitudinal halves.) It dates to approximately 650 to 700 AD and the Wollaston helmet to the time around 675 AD, although a date more specific than the sixth or seventh century AD has not been suggested for the Guilden Morden boar.

Understood in its broader context, the boar would likely have adorned an early model of the "crested helmets" known in Northern Europe in the sixth through eleventh centuries AD. Though the remains of fifty such helmets are known, most are from Scandinavia and only five from the Anglo-Saxon period are preserved enough that their original form can be determined. (Note: A sixth reconstructible Anglo-Saxon helmet, the Shorwell helmet, is known. It is of the Frankish style and not of the crested variety.) These, the helmets from Benty Grange, Sutton Hoo, Coppergate, Wollaston and Staffordshire, may have shared similarities with the helmet to which the Guilden Morden boar was attached. Scandinavian helmets are also depicted artistically with boar crests, such as on one of the four Torslunda plates found in Sweden. The boars atop the helmets worn by the two warriors on the plate are highly similar to the one from Guilden Morden, and similarly appear to be fastened to their helmets with a pin and socket device.

== Iconography ==
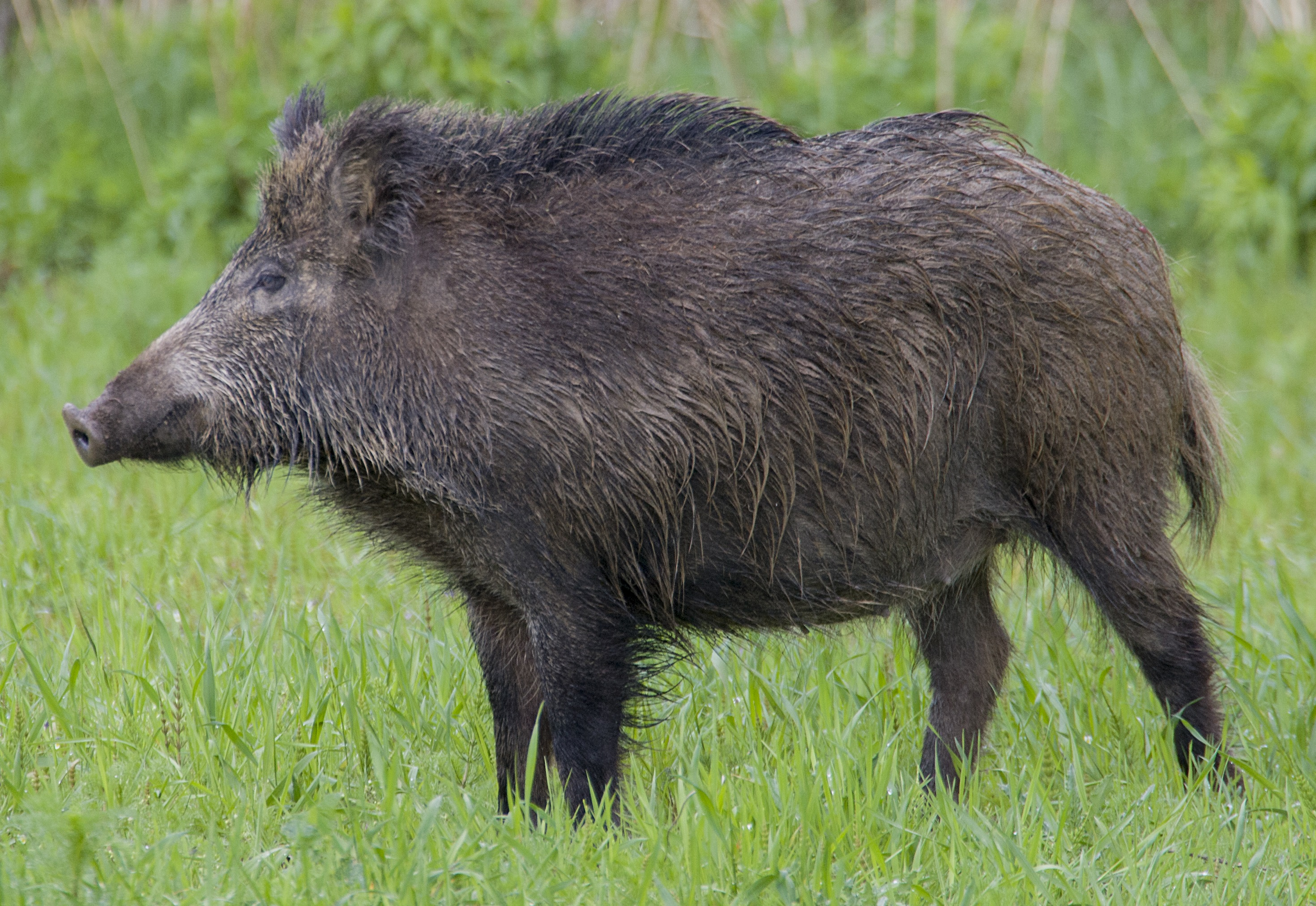
A Central European boar

The boar was an important symbol in prehistoric Europe, where, according to the archaeologist Jennifer Foster, it was "venerated, eulogised, hunted and eaten ... for millennia, until its virtual extinction in recent historical time." Anglo-Saxon boar symbols follow a thousand years of similar iconography, coming after La Tène examples in the fourth century BC, Gaulish specimens three centuries later, and Roman boars in the fourth century AD. They likely represent a fused tradition of European and Mediterranean cultures. The boar is said to have been sacred to a mother goddess figure among linguistically Celtic communities in Iron Age Europe, while the Roman historian Tacitus, writing around the first century AD, suggested that the Baltic Aesti wore boar symbols in battle to invoke her protection.

Boar-crested helmets are depicted on the turn-of-the-millennium Gundestrup cauldron, discovered in Denmark, and on a Torslunda plate from Sweden, made some five hundred years later. Though the Romans also included the boar in their stable of symbols—four legions, including the twentieth, adopted it as their emblem—it was only one among many. The boar persisted in continental Germanic tradition during the nearly 400 years of Roman rule in Britain, such as in association with the Scandinavian gods Freyja and Freyr. Its return to prominence in the Anglo-Saxon period, as represented by the boars from Benty Grange, Wollaston, Guilden Morden, and Horncastle, may therefore suggest the post-Roman introduction of a Germanic tradition from Europe, rather than the continuation of a tradition in Britain through 400 years of Roman rule. Whatever its precise symbolism, the Anglo-Saxon boar appears to have been associated with protection; the Beowulf poet makes this clear, writing that boar symbols on helmets kept watch over the warriors wearing them.

=== Boar-crests in Beowulf ===
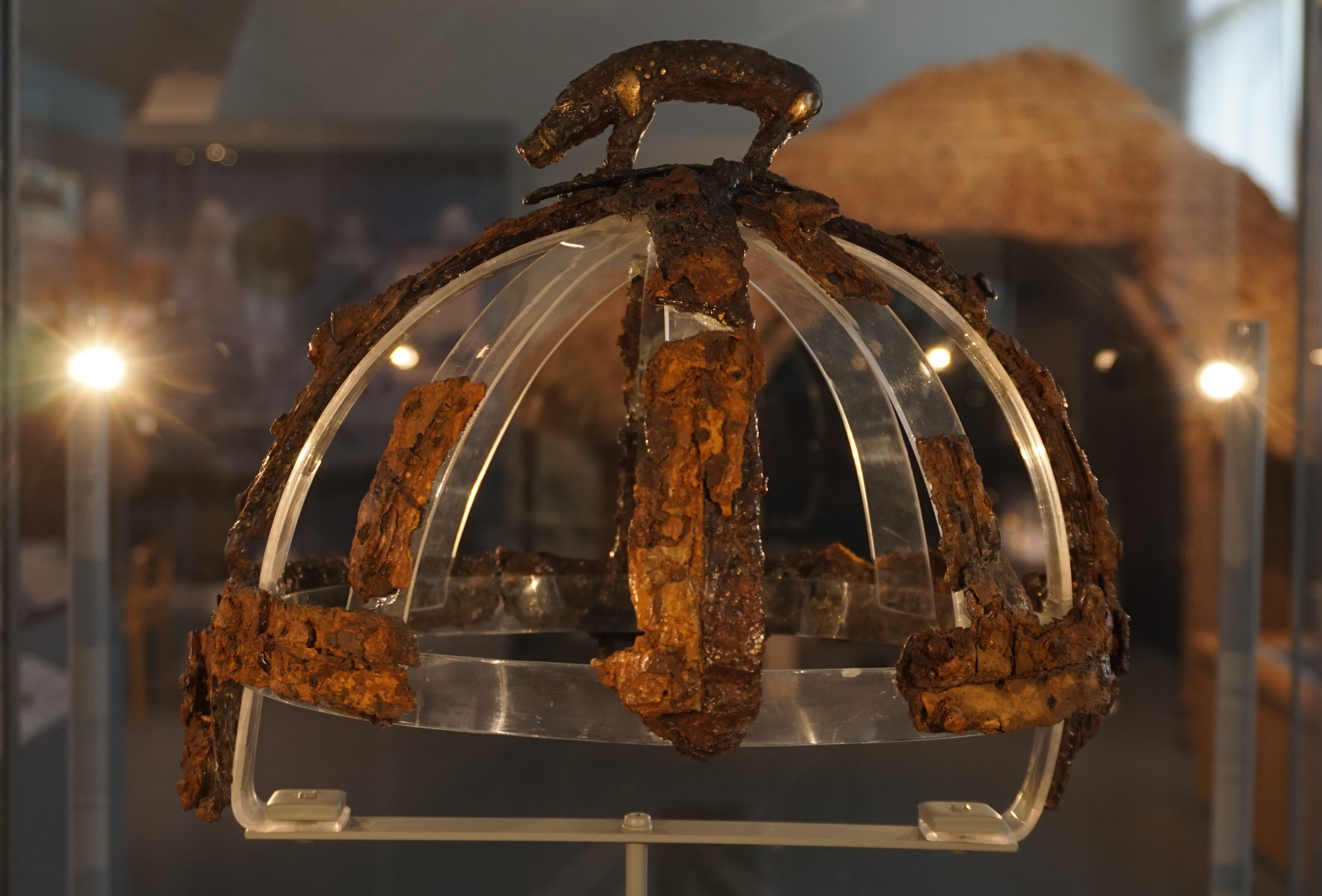
The boar-crested Benty Grange helmet

The Guilden Morden boar recalls the Anglo-Saxon poem Beowulf, where helmets with boar imagery are referenced five times. In three cases they appear to feature freestanding boars atop the helmets, like the Guilden Morden example. (Note: In the other two instances boars are referred to in the plural, such as when Beowulf and his men leave their ship as "[b]oar-shapes flashed above their cheek-guards". (eoforlic scionon ofer hleorbergan) These references were perhaps made with the intention of recalling boars like those on the eyebrows of the Sutton Hoo helmet.) Such is the case when Grendel's mother seeks vengeance for the death of her son.

Com þa to Heorote, ðær Hring-Dene
geond þæt sæld swæfun. Þa ðær sona wearð
edhwyrft eorlum, siþðan inne fealh
Grendles modor. Wæs se gryre læssa
efne swa micle, swa bið mægþa cræft,
wiggryre wifes be wæpnedmen,
þonne heoru bunden, hamere geþruen,
sweord swate fah swin ofer helme
ecgum dyhtig andweard scireð.
Ða wæs on healle heardecg togen
sweord ofer setlum, sidrand manig
hafen handa fæst; helm ne gemunde,
byrnan side, þa hine se broga angeat.

— Old English text
Translation:

She came to Heorot. There, inside the hall,
Danes lay asleep, earls who would soon endure
a great reversal, once Grendel's mother
attacked and entered. Her onslaught was less
only by as much as an amazon warrior's
strength is less than an armed man's
when the hefted sword, its hammered edge
and gleaming blade slathered in blood,
razed the sturdy boar-ridge off a helmet.
Then in the hall, hard-honed swords
were grabbed from the bench, many a broad shield
lifted and braced; there was little thought of helmets
or woven mail when they woke in terror.

— English Translation

In another case, Hrothgar laments the death of Æschere, "my right-hand man when the ranks clashed and our boar-crests had to take a battering in the line of action" (eaxlgestealla, ðonne we on orlege hafelan weredon, þonne hniton feþan, eoferas cnysedan). Both instances likely refer to crests such as those on the Benty Grange or Wollaston helmets, or to the one found in Guilden Morden.

== Bibliography ==
- Bateman, Thomas (1861). Ten Years' Digging in Celtic and Saxon Grave Hills, in the counties of Derby, Stafford, and York, from 1848 to 1858; with Notices of some Former Discoveries, Hitherto Unpublished, and Remarks on the Crania and Pottery from the Mounds. London: John Russell Smith. pp. 28–33.
- Beowulf. n.d.

- Old English quotations above use the Klaeber text, published as Klaeber, Friedrich (1922). Beowulf and The Fight at Finnsburg. Boston: D.C. Heath & Company.

- Bruce-Mitford, Rupert (Autumn 1972). "The Sutton Hoo Helmet: A New Reconstruction". The British Museum Quarterly. XXXVI (3–4). British Museum: 120–130. doi:10.2307/4423116. JSTOR 4423116.
- Bruce-Mitford, Rupert (1974). Aspects of Anglo-Saxon Archaeology: Sutton Hoo and Other Discoveries. London: Victor Gollancz Limited. ISBN 0-575-01704-X.
- Butterworth, Jenni; Fregni, Giovanna; Fuller, Kayleigh & Greaves, Pieta (2016). "The Importance of Multidisciplinary Work within Archaeological Conservation Projects: Assembly of the Staffordshire Hoard Die-impressed Sheets". Journal of the Institute of Conservation. 39 (1). Institute of Conservation: 29–43. doi:10.1080/19455224.2016.1155071.
- Chaney, William A. (1970). The Cult of Kingship in Anglo-Saxon England: The Transition from Paganism to Christianity. Manchester: Manchester University Press.
- Cornford, Francis Macdonald (1904). "Sibyl Fresco at Cortina d'Ampezzo" (PDF). Proceedings of the Cambridge Antiquarian Society. X (4). Cambridge Antiquarian Society: 369–373.
- Cramp, Rosemary J. (1957). "Beowulf and Archaeology" (PDF). Medieval Archaeology. 1. Society for Medieval Archaeology: 57–77. doi:10.1080/00766097.1957.11735382.
- Davidson, Hilda Ellis (1968). "Archaeology and Beowulf". In Garmonsway, George Norman & Simpson, Jacqueline (eds.). Beowulf and its Analogues. London: J. M. Dent & Sons. pp. 350–360. OCLC 421931242.
- Fordham, Herbert George (1904). "A Small Bronze Object Found near Guilden Morden" (PDF). Proceedings of the Cambridge Antiquarian Society. X (4). Cambridge Antiquarian Society: 373–374, 404.
  - Image on page 404
- "Fordham, Sir Herbert George (1854–1929)". Oxford Dictionary of National Biography (online ed.). Oxford University Press. doi:10.1093/ref:odnb/33200. (Subscription, Wikipedia Library access or UK public library membership required.)
- Foster, Jennifer (1977a). "Notes and News: A Boar Figurine from Guilden Morden, Cambs" (PDF). Medieval Archaeology. XXI. Society for Medieval Archaeology: 166–167. doi:10.5284/1000320.
  - Images on plate XIV
- Foster, Jennifer (1977b). "Bronze Boar Figurines in Iron Age and Roman Britain". British Archaeological Reports. 39. ISBN 978-0-904531-74-9.
- Frank, Roberta (2008). "The Boar on the Helmet". In Karkov, Catherine E. & Damico, Helen (eds.). Aedificia Nova: Studies in Honor of Rosemary Cramp. Publications of the Richard Rawlinson Center. Kalamazoo: Medieval Institute Publications, Western Michigan University. pp. 76–88. ISBN 978-1-58044-110-0.
- Grove, Richard (1976). "Coprolite Mining in Cambridgeshire". The Agricultural History Review. 24 (1). British Agricultural History Society: 36–43. JSTOR 40273687.
- Hatto, Arthur Thomas (August 1957a). "Snake-swords and Boar-helmets in Beowulf". English Studies. XXXVIII (4): 145–160. doi:10.1080/00138385708596994.
- Hatto, Arthur Thomas (December 1957b). "Notes and News: Snake-swords and Boar-helmets". English Studies. XXXVIII (6): 257–259. doi:10.1080/00138385708597004.
- Heaney, Seamus (2000). Beowulf: A New Verse Translation. New York: W. W. Norton.
- "helmet(?); figurine". The British Museum Collection Online. The British Museum. Archived from the original on 28 May 2024.
- Hood, Jamie; Ager, Barry; Williams, Craig; Harrington, Susan & Cartwright, Caroline (2012). "Investigating and Interpreting an Early-to-mid Sixth-century Frankish Style Helmet" (PDF). The British Museum Technical Research Bulletin. 6. British Museum: 83–95. ISBN 978-1-904982-80-7.
- Meadows, Ian (1996–1997). "The Pioneer Helmet". Northamptonshire Archaeology. 27. Northamptonshire Archaeological Society: 191–193. doi:10.5284/1083264. OCLC 221836053.
- Meadows, Ian (1997). "The Pioneer Helmet: A Dark-Age Princely Burial from Northamptonshire". Medieval Life (8): 2–4. ISSN 1357-6291.
- Meadows, Ian (2010) [2004]. "An Anglian Warrior Burial from Wollaston, Northamptonshire". Northamptonshire Archaeology Reports. 10 (110) (digital ed.). Northamptonshire County Council.
- Morley, John (17 April 1905). Return to an Order of the Honourable The House of Commons, dated 7 March 1904;—for, COPY "of Account of the Income and Expenditure of the British Museum (Special Trust Funds) for the Year ending the 31st day of March 1905; and, Return of the Number of Persons admitted to visit the Museum and the British Museum (Natural History) in each Year from 1899 to 1904, both Years inclusive; together with a Statement of the Progress made in the Arrangement and Description of the Collections, and an Account of Objects added to them in the Year 1904 (Report). London: His Majesty's Stationery Office.
- "Room 41: Europe AD 300–1100". The British Museum.
- Speake, George (1980). Anglo-Saxon Animal Art. Oxford: Clarendon Press. ISBN 0-19-813194-1. LCCN 79-41091.
- Stiegemann, Christoph; Kroker, Martin & Walter, Wolfgang, eds. (2013a). CREDO: Christianisierung Europas im Mittelalter (in German). Vol. I: Essays. Petersberg: Michael Imhof Verlag. ISBN 978-3-86568-827-9.
- Stiegemann, Christoph; Kroker, Martin & Walter, Wolfgang, eds. (2013b). CREDO: Christianisierung Europas im Mittelalter (in German). Vol. II: Katalog. Petersberg: Michael Imhof Verlag. ISBN 978-3-86568-827-9.
- Steuer, Heiko (1987). "Helm und Ringschwert: Prunkbewaffnung und Rangabzeichen germanischer Krieger" [Helmet and Ring-Sword: Ornamental Weapons and Insignia of Germanic Warriors]. In Häßler, Hans-Jürgen (ed.). Studien zur Sachsenforschung [Studies in Saxon Research] (in German). Vol. 6. Hildesheim: Lax. pp. 189–236. ISBN 3-7848-1617-7.
- Tacitus (1868). "Germany and its Tribes". The Agricola and Germania of Tacitus. Translated by Church, Alfred John & Brodribb, William Jackson. London: Macmillan.
- Tacitus (1886). "Germania". In Church, Alfred John & Brodribb, William Jackson (eds.). The Agricola and Germania of Tacitus: With a Revised Text, English Notes, and Maps. London: Macmillan. p. 25.
- Tweddle, Dominic (1992). The Anglian Helmet from 16–22 Coppergate. The Archaeology of York. Vol. 17/8. London: Council for British Archaeology. ISBN 1-872414-19-2. Archived from the original on 21 March 2024.
- Whitaker, Allan (2006). "Fordham's Brewery". Brewers in Hertfordshire. Hertfordshire: University of Hertfordshire Press. pp. 42–46. ISBN 0-9542189-7-3.
