= Pioneer Helmet =

7th-century Anglo-Saxon boar-crested helmet

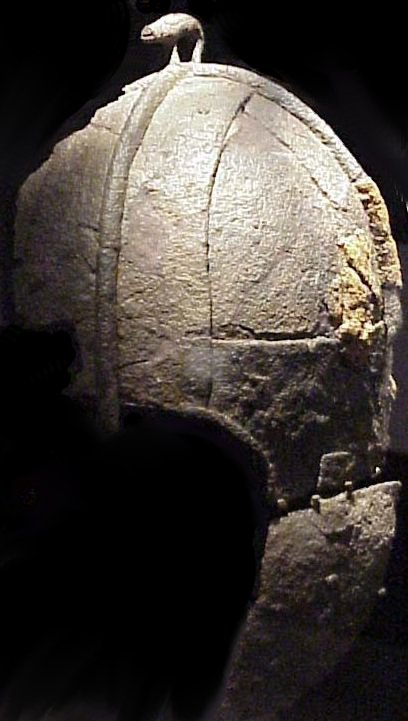
- The Pioneer Helmet
- Material: Iron
- Created: 7th century
- Discovered: 1997; Wollaston, Northamptonshire, United Kingdom; 52.25553°N 0.70387°W
- Discovered by: Ian Meadows
- Present location: Royal Armouries Museum, Leeds

The Pioneer Helmet (also known as the Wollaston Helmet or Northamptonshire Helmet), is an Anglo-Saxon helmet from the late seventh century found in Wollaston, Northamptonshire, United Kingdom. The boar-crested helmet was discovered during a March 1997 excavation before the land was to be mined for gravel and was part of the grave of a young man. Other objects in the grave, such as a hanging bowl and a pattern welded sword, suggest that it was the burial mound of a high-status warrior.

The sparsely decorated nature of the helmet, a utilitarian iron fighting piece, belies its rarity. It is one of just six Anglo-Saxon helmets yet discovered, joined by finds from Benty Grange (1848), Sutton Hoo (1939), Coppergate (1982), Shorwell (2004) and Staffordshire (2009); its basic form is nearly identical to that of the richer Coppergate helmet found in York. Like these, the Pioneer Helmet is an example of the "crested helmets" that flourished in England and Scandinavia from the sixth through eleventh centuries.

The distinctive feature of the helmet is the boar mounted atop its crest. Boar-crested helmets are a staple of Anglo-Saxon imagery, evidence of a Germanic tradition in which the boar invoked the protection of the gods. The Pioneer Helmet is one of three—together with the Benty Grange helmet and the detached Guilden Morden boar—known to have survived. These boar crests recall a time when such decoration may have been common; the Anglo-Saxon poem Beowulf, in which boar-adorned helmets are mentioned five times, speaks of a funeral pyre "heaped with boar-shaped helmets forged in gold," forging a link between the warrior hero of legend and the Pioneer Helmet of reality.

The helmet was named after Pioneer Aggregates UK Ltd, who funded its excavation and conservation. It was unveiled at the New Walk Museum in Leicester, and as of 2018 is on display at the Royal Armouries Museum in Leeds.

== Description ==
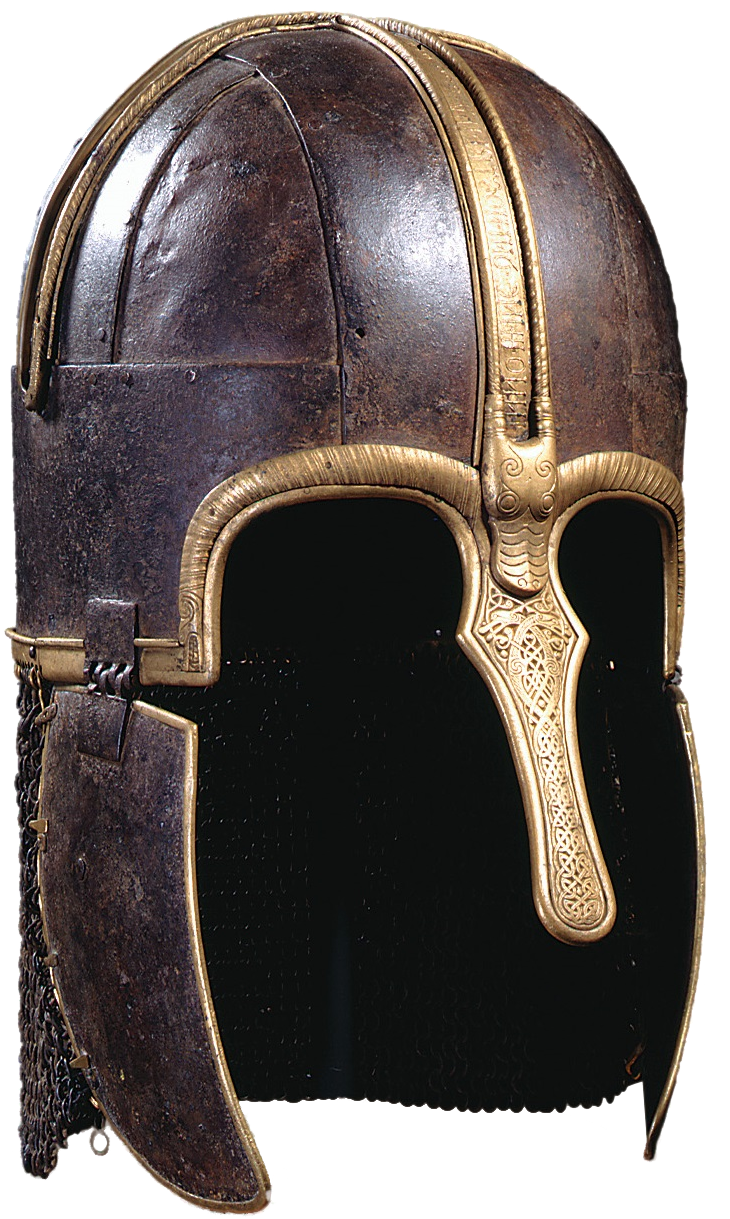
The basic construction of the richer Coppergate helmet is similar to that of the Pioneer Helmet.

The helmet has the same basic form as the Anglo-Saxon Coppergate helmet, but is a utilitarian piece with little decoration, and is larger, perhaps to allow for additional padding. It originally consisted of an iron skull cap, from which hung two cheek guards. The form of neck protection that the helmet afforded, if any, is uncertain, owing to ploughing damage to the helmet.

The cap of the helmet was constructed from twelve individual components riveted together. The basic form was created by four pieces: a brow band joined by a nose-to-nape band, and, on either side, a lateral band reaching from the side of the brow band to the top of the nose-to-nape band. Cutouts at the front of the brow and nose-to-nape bands functioned as eye-holes, and a 5 mm (0.20 in) wide strip of metal was riveted along the edge of the openings, perhaps to provide balance or decoration. Four subtriangular infill plates were riveted inside to cover the resulting holes. Finally, three narrow C-sectioned strips were added to provide additional strength, one each running the length of the nose-to-nape and lateral bands. The nasal is not a separate component, but rather is a continuation of the nose-to-nape bands.

Atop the helmet was set the boar. It was affixed to the C-sectioned nose-to-nape strip, and was forged from a single rod of iron. Its back was bent downwards to form the hind legs, while the front of the rod was split, one part bent to form the forelegs, the other part continuing forward to form the boar's snout. Beyond very minor details—the snout was made to be slightly triangular, the hind was somewhat flattened, and slight grooves in the forelegs suggested individual limbs—the boar was not decorated.

Beneath the cap hung two cheek guards. The sinister cheek guard, which is all that remains other than minor fragments of the dexter, was 110 mm (4.3 in) long and 86 mm (3.4 in) wide at the top. It was curved inward both laterally and longitudinally other than the upper rear edge which was bent outwards, either intentionally to improve the articulation of the joint, or by damage incurred during use. Two strips of metal were then bent in half, with one folded around the brow band and one around the cheek guard, and attached by a single rivet through each. These encased a narrow loop of wire which held the cheek guards to the cap. A single rivet was also attached to the middle of the guard, probably to facilitate the attachment of leather strips used to draw tight the cheek guards.

The form of neck protection on the helmet, if any, is unclear. The bottom of the back of the helmet is largely missing, although the portion that survives appears to have at least two perforations. These would most likely have been used to attach a neck guard, perhaps like the one made of camail on the Coppergate helmet, yet no such remains were found. A series of unexplained iron rods found near the helmet could theoretically have been used as stiffeners for an organic neck guard, such as one made of leather, but such an arrangement has no known parallels; it is instead thought that the rods were more likely belt stiffeners.

== Discovery ==
The helmet was discovered over Easter in March 1997 in Wollaston, near Wellingborough, Northamptonshire. Excavations in the area had taken place for years on behalf of various aggregate companies before the land was exploited for gravel, and had uncovered an extensive network of Iron Age and Roman farms. The evidence for post-Roman habitation, however, had been limited to two fragments of a brooch, and two separate collections of pottery, when metal detector surveying discovered a copper alloy hanging bowl and a millefiori-decorated mount in what turned out to be a grave. The hanging bowl was detected by Steve Critchley, working alongside the archaeologist Ian Meadows. Meadows immediately recognised the bowl for what it was, and began an excavation.

The grave was in the shape of an elongated oval 2.8 m (9.2 ft) long and 1.3 m (4.3 ft) wide, and may have originally been a tumulus. It was only 8 m (26 ft) from a main contemporary roadway and was likely intended to have been seen by those passing by. Owing to ensuing years of cultivation and ploughing of the fields, the grave was only 15 cm (0.5 ft) deep when excavated. Various artefacts were therefore damaged, and any originally placed higher in the grave, such as a shield or spearheads, may have been completely destroyed. The grave was excavated with brushes and wooden tools, revealing a number of bone fragments, including part of a skull; these were used to suggest that the body was that of a man seventeen to twenty-five years old, laid in a supine position with his head on a pillow and knees slightly raised. Also found were three iron buckles, a small iron knife, a small copper alloy hook, and a series of iron rods of unknown function. A pattern welded sword was also found, and together with the hanging bowl and helmet, marks the grave as one for a person of high social status.

The helmet lay next to where the left hip of the body would have rested. It was on its sinister side, with almost the entirety of the dexter side lost through ploughing. Prior to its deposition the nasal had been bent inwards, fracturing the metal, perhaps in a "ritual killing" of the object; a custom known to many cultures, including Anglo-Saxons and Vikings, the practice involves the deliberate breaking of objects before burial for reasons ranging from the releasing of an object's spirit, to the deterrence of grave robbing. When found it was at first thought to be a bucket. Archaeologists covered it in cling film, then wrapped it in plaster of Paris bandages and raised it in a soil block. This was taken to the conservation laboratory at the Newarke Houses Museum in Leicester, where it was analysed, and later conserved, by Anthony "Rolly" Read. The plaster-covered soil block was first x-rayed, revealing the boar-crested helmet within.

The remaining half of the helmet was broken into many pieces—between 100 and 200 overall—including some which were deposited within the helmet itself. These fragments were reassembled using the cellulose nitrate adhesive HMG; the surviving cheek guard, alone, was reassembled from eighteen fragments. The helmet was then dried out and taken to the Leicester General Hospital, where it was subjected to digital x-rays and CT scans. Using this information it was then cleaned, and samples of organic materials—principally textiles and leather, perhaps from the helmet's lining, as well as possible feathers on the brow band—were taken. It was then reassembled into seven larger parts, cleaned again, and finally reconstructed into one piece. Missing sections within the remaining half were then filled in and painted, and in the last step, the boar was affixed to the apex using epoxy. Newspapers as far away as Australia and New Zealand published accounts of the discovery in April, hailing it as "the find of the decade". The helmet was placed on public display on 23 December 1997.

The Wollaston burial was on private land owned by Peter Gammidge and John Minney, and the helmet is now owned by Gammidge and the family of the late Minney. It was termed the "Pioneer Helmet" after Pioneer Aggregates UK Ltd (now owned by Heidelberg Materials UK), who fully funded the conservation, and who had over time spent more than £400,000 funding archaeology in the area. The helmet was displayed until March 1998 at the New Walk Museum in Leicester, the site of its unveiling. Currently it is on display at the Royal Armouries Museum in Leeds, West Yorkshire.

== Typology ==
The Pioneer Helmet is dated to the late seventh century on the basis of the style of belt buckles found in the grave, which were current around 675. This suggests a terminus post quem (earliest possible date) for the burial, although not necessarily the helmet's exact date of manufacture or deposition. It is of Anglo-Saxon origin, one of only six such helmets known along with those from Benty Grange, Sutton Hoo, York, Shorwell, and Staffordshire. Like these examples—with the exception of the Frankish Shorwell helmet—the Pioneer Helmet is broadly classed as one of the "crested helmets" known in Northern Europe in the sixth through eleventh centuries AD. These are each characterised by a rounded cap and usually a prominent nose-to-nape crest. Except for an outlier fragment found in Kyiv, all crested helmets originate from England or Scandinavia, and are distinct from the continental spangenhelm and lamellenhelm from the same period.

== Iconography ==
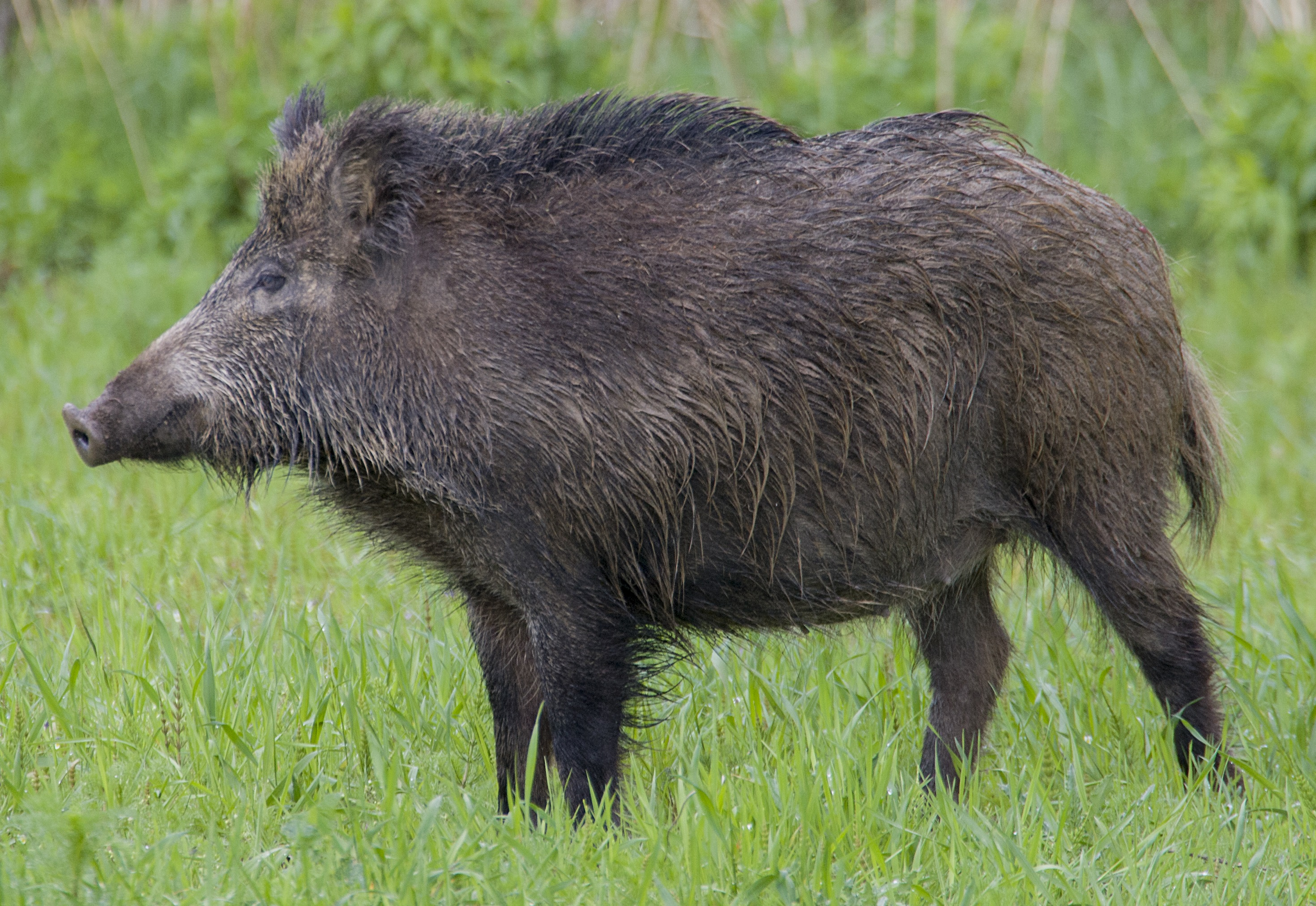
A Central European boar

The boar was an important symbol in prehistoric Europe, where, according to the archaeologist Jennifer Foster, it was "venerated, eulogised, hunted and eaten ... for millennia, until its virtual extinction in recent historical time." Anglo-Saxon boar symbols follow a thousand years of similar iconography, coming after La Tène examples in the fourth century BC, Gaulish specimens three centuries later, and Roman boars in the fourth century AD. They likely represent a fused tradition of European and Mediterranean cultures. The boar is said to have been sacred to a mother goddess figure among linguistically Celtic communities in Iron Age Europe, while the Roman historian Tacitus, writing around the first century AD, suggested that the Baltic Aesti wore boar symbols in battle to invoke her protection.

Boar-crested helmets are depicted on the turn-of-the-millennium Gundestrup cauldron, discovered in Denmark, and on a Torslunda plate from Sweden, made some 500 years later. Though the Romans also included the boar in their stable of symbols—four legions, including the twentieth, adopted it as their emblem—it was only one among many. The boar persisted in continental Germanic tradition during the nearly 400 years of Roman rule in Britain, such as in association with the Scandinavian gods Freyja and Freyr. Its return to prominence in the Anglo-Saxon period, as represented by the boars from Benty Grange, Wollaston, Guilden Morden, and Horncastle, may therefore suggest the post-Roman reintroduction of a Germanic tradition from Europe, rather than the continuation of a tradition in Britain through 400 years of Roman rule. Whatever its precise symbolism, the Anglo-Saxon boar appears to have been associated with protection; the Beowulf poet makes this clear, writing that boar symbols on helmets kept watch over the warriors wearing them.

=== Boar-crests in Beowulf ===
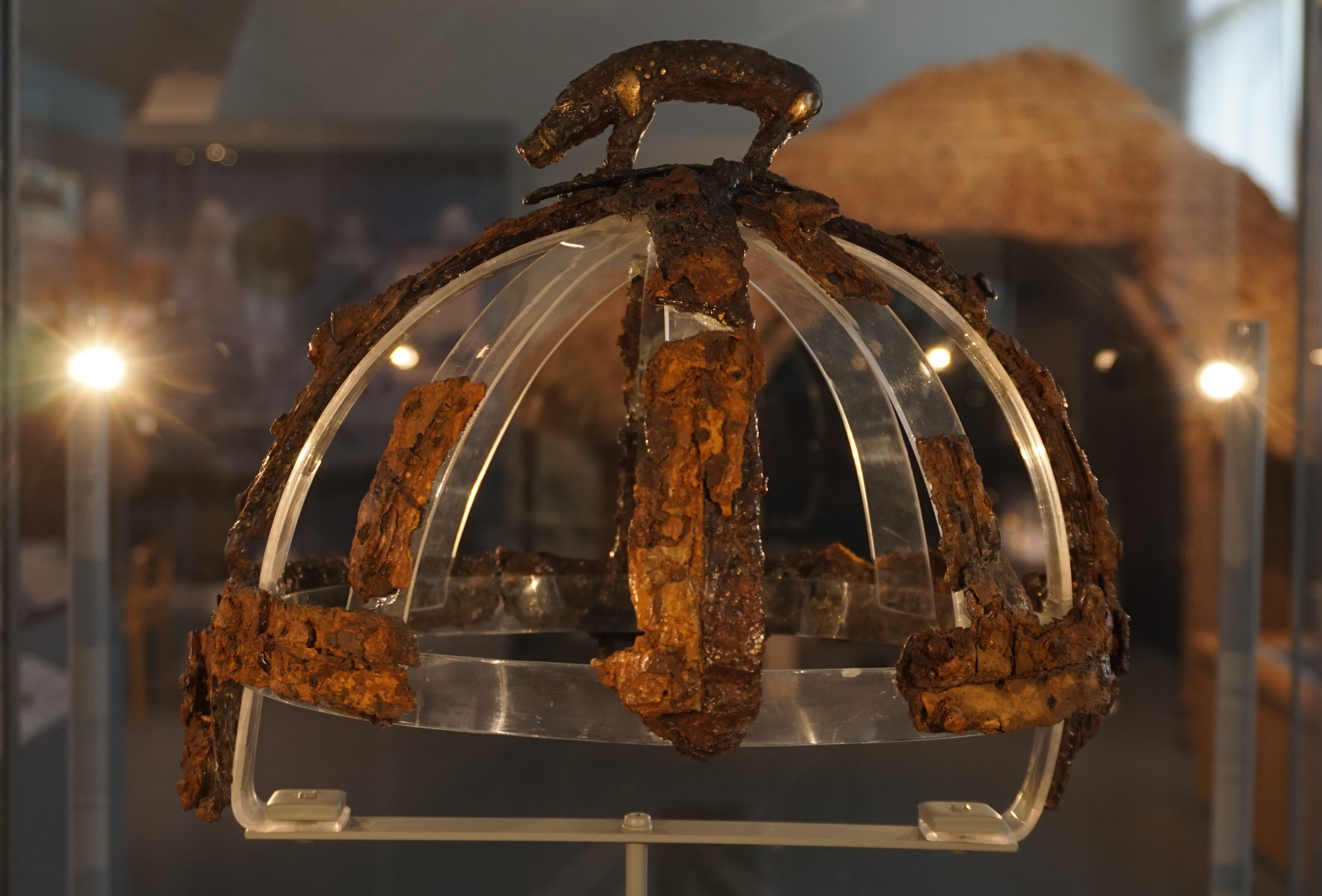
The Benty Grange helmet, displayed in Weston Park Museum in Sheffield.

The boar-crested Pioneer Helmet recalls the Anglo-Saxon poem Beowulf, in which helmets with boar imagery are referenced five times. In three cases they appear to feature freestanding boars atop the helmets, like the Wollaston example. (Note: In the other two instances boars are referred to in the plural, such as when Beowulf and his men leave their ship as "[b]oar-shapes flashed above their cheek-guards" (eoforlic scionon ofer hleorbergan). These references were perhaps made with the intention of recalling boars like those on the eyebrows of the Sutton Hoo helmet.) Such is the case after Grendel is defeated, when a minstrel entertains Beowulf and his men with the story of the Fight at Finnsburh, in which Hnæf, king of the Danes, died.

Ad wæs geæfned, ond icge gold
ahæfen of horde. Here-Scyldinga
betst beadorinca wæs on bæl gearu.
Æt þæm ade wæs eþgesyne
swatfah syrce, swyn ealgylden,
eofer irenheard, æþeling manig
wundum awyrded; sume on wæle crungon!
Het ða Hildeburh æt Hnæfes ade
hire selfre sunu sweoloðe befæstan,
banfatu bærnan, ond on bæl don
eame on eaxle. Ides gnornode,
geomrode giddum. Guðrinc astah.
Wand to wolcnum wælfyra mæst,
hlynode for hlawe; hafelan multon,
bengeato burston, ðonne blod ætspranc,
laðbite lices. Lig ealle forswealg,
gæsta gifrost, þara ðe þær guð fornam
bega folces; wæs hira blæd scacen.

— Old English text
Translation:

A funeral pyre was then prepared,
effulgent gold brought out from the hoard.
The pride and prince of the Shieldings lay
awaiting the flame. Everywhere
there were blood-plastered coats of mail.
The pyre was heaped with boar-shaped helmets
forged in gold, with the gashed corpses
of well-born Danes — many had fallen.
The Hildeburh ordered her own
son's body be burnt with Hnæf's,
the flesh on his bones to sputter and blaze
beside his uncle's. The woman wailed
and sang keens, the warrior went up.
Carcass flame swirled and fumed,
they stood round the burial mound and howled
as heads melted, crusted gashes
spattered and ran bloody matter.
The glutton element flamed and consumed
the dead of both sides. Their great days were gone.

— English Translation

In another case, Hrothgar laments the death of Æschere, "my right-hand man when the ranks clashed and our boar-crests had to take a battering in the line of action" (eaxlgestealla, ðonne we on orlege hafelan weredon, þonne hniton feþan, eoferas cnysedan). Both instances likely refer to crests such as those on the Benty Grange and Pioneer Helmet, or to the one found in Guilden Morden. These three boars forge a link between the legendary warrior hero of poetry and reality, with each shedding light on the other.

== Bibliography ==
- "Anglo-Saxon Helmet Restored". Pioneer News. No. 29. December 1997. p. 1.
- Bateman, Thomas (1861). Ten Years' Digging in Celtic and Saxon Grave Hills, in the Counties of Derby, Stafford, and York, from 1848 to 1858; with Notices of some Former Discoveries, Hitherto Unpublished, and Remarks on the Crania and Pottery from the Mounds. London: John Russell Smith. pp. 28–33.
- Beowulf. n.d.

- Old English quotations above use the Klaeber text, published as Klaeber, Friedrich (1922). Beowulf and The Fight at Finnsburg. Boston: D.C. Heath & Company.

- Bruce-Mitford, Rumpert (Autumn 1972). "The Sutton Hoo Helmet: A New Reconstruction". The British Museum Quarterly. XXXVI (3–4). British Museum: 120–130. doi:10.2307/4423116. JSTOR 4423116.
- Bruce-Mitford, Rupert (1974). Aspects of Anglo-Saxon Archaeology: Sutton Hoo and Other Discoveries. London: Victor Gollancz Limited. ISBN 0-575-01704-X.
- Butterworth, Jenni; Fregni, Giovanna; Fuller, Kayleigh & Greaves, Pieta (2016). "The Importance of Multidisciplinary Work Within Archaeological Conservation Projects: Assembly of the Staffordshire Hoard Die-Impressed Sheets". Journal of the Institute of Conservation. 39 (1). Institute of Conservation: 29–43. doi:10.1080/19455224.2016.1155071.
- Chaney, William A. (1970). The Cult of Kingship in Anglo-Saxon England: The Transition from Paganism to Christianity. Manchester: Manchester University Press. ISBN 0-520-01401-4.
- Cramp, Rosemary J. (1957). "Beowulf and Archaeology" (PDF). Medieval Archaeology. 1. Society for Medieval Archaeology: 57–77. doi:10.1080/00766097.1957.11735382.
- Davidson, Hilda Ellis (1968). "Archaeology and Beowulf". In Garmonsway, George Norman & Simpson, Jacqueline (eds.). Beowulf and its Analogues. London: J. M. Dent & Sons. pp. 350–360. OCLC 421931242.
- Foster, Jennifer (1977a). "Notes and News: A Boar Figurine from Guilden Morden, Cambs" (PDF). Medieval Archaeology. XXI. Society for Medieval Archaeology: 166–167. doi:10.5284/1000320.
  - Images on plate XIV
- Foster, Jennifer (1977b). "Bronze Boar Figurines in Iron Age and Roman Britain". British Archaeological Reports. 39. BAR Publishing. ISBN 978-0-904531-74-9.
- Frank, Roberta (2008). "The Boar on the Helmet". In Karkov, Catherine E. & Damico, Helen (eds.). Aedificia Nova: Studies in Honor of Rosemary Cramp. Publications of the Richard Rawlinson Center. Kalamazoo: Medieval Institute Publications, Western Michigan University. pp. 76–88. ISBN 978-1-58044-110-0.
- Grinsell, Leslie V. (September 1961). "The Breaking of Objects as a Funerary Rite". Folklore. 72 (3). Folk-Lore Society: 475–491. doi:10.1080/0015587x.1961.9717293. JSTOR 1258576.
- Hammond, Norman (23 April 1997). "Experts Hail Discovery of Saxon War Chief's Armour". Home News. The Times. No. 65, 871. London. p. 6.
- Hatto, Arthur Thomas (August 1957a). "Snake-Swords and Boar-Helmets in Beowulf". English Studies. XXXVIII (4): 145–160. doi:10.1080/00138385708596994.
- Heaney, Seamus (2000). Beowulf: A New Verse Translation. New York: W. W. Norton. ISBN 0-393-32097-9.
- Hood, Jamie; Ager, Barry; Williams, Craig; Harrington, Susan & Cartwright, Caroline (2012). "Investigating and Interpreting an Early-to-Mid Sixth-Century Frankish Style Helmet" (PDF). The British Museum Technical Research Bulletin. 6. British Museum: 83–95. ISBN 978-1-904982-80-7.
- Irwin, Aisling (23 April 1997). "'Beowulf' Treasure is Find of the Decade". The Daily Telegraph. No. 44, 118. London. p. 3.
- Meadows, Ian (November 1996). "Wollaston: The Nene Valley, a British Moselle?". Current Archaeology. 13 (150). Current Publishing: 212–215. ISSN 0011-3212.
- Meadows, Ian (1996–1997). "The Pioneer Helmet". Northamptonshire Archaeology. 27. Northamptonshire Archaeological Society: 191–193. doi:10.5284/1083264. ISSN 0305-4659.
- Meadows, Ian (September 1997). "Wollaston: The 'Pioneer' Burial". Current Archaeology. 13 (154). Current Publishing: 391–395. ISSN 0011-3212.
- Meadows, Ian (1997–1998). "The Pioneer Helmet: A Dark-Age Princely Burial from Northamptonshire". Medieval Life (8). Medieval Life Publications: 2–4. ISSN 1357-6291.
- Meadows, Ian (1998). "Wollaston (Centre SP885628)" (PDF). South Midlands Archaeology (28). Council for British Archaeology, South Midlands Group: 38–39. ISSN 0960-7552.
- Meadows, Ian (March 2004). "An Anglian Warrior Burial from Wollaston, Northamptonshire". Northamptonshire Archaeology Reports. 10 (110) (2010 digital ed.). Northamptonshire County Council.
- "Pioneer Aggregates (UK) Limited". Companies House. Archived from the original on 28 May 2024.
- Read, Anthony (2006). "The Conservation of the Wollaston Anglian Helmet". In Smith, Robert Douglas (ed.). Make All Sure: The Conservation and Restoration of Arms and Armour. Leeds: Basiliscoe Press. pp. 38–43. ISBN 0-9551622-0-3.
- Saraceni, Jessica E. (November–December 1997). "Saxon Helmet Restored". Archaeology. 50 (6). Archaeological Institute of America. ISSN 0003-8113.
- Speake, George (1980). Anglo-Saxon Animal Art. Oxford: Clarendon Press. ISBN 0-19-813194-1. LCCN 79-41091.
- Steuer, Heiko (1987). "Helm und Ringschwert: Prunkbewaffnung und Rangabzeichen germanischer Krieger" [Helmet and Ring-Sword: Ornamental Weapons and Insignia of Germanic Warriors]. In Häßler, Hans-Jürgen (ed.). Studien zur Sachsenforschung [Studies in Saxon Research] (in German). Vol. 6. Hildesheim: Lax. pp. 189–236. ISBN 3-7848-1617-7.
- Tacitus (1868). "Germany and its Tribes". The Agricola and Germania of Tacitus. Translated by Church, Alfred John & Brodribb, William Jackson. London: Macmillan. ISBN 978-1-02-237238-2.
- Tacitus (1886). "Germania". In Church, Alfred John & Brodribb, William Jackson (eds.). The Agricola and Germania of Tacitus: With a Revised Text, English Notes, and Maps. London: Macmillan.
- Tweddle, Dominic (1992). The Anglian Helmet from 16–22 Coppergate. The Archaeology of York. Vol. 17/8. London: Council for British Archaeology. ISBN 1-872414-19-2. Archived from the original on 21 March 2024.
- Webster, Leslie & Meadows, Ian (July–August 1997). "Discovery of Anglo-Saxon Helmet with Boar Crest" (PDF). Minerva. 8 (4). Jerome M. Eisenberg: 3–5. ISSN 0957-7718.
