= Guilden =

Guilden is part of the name of the following places in England:

- Guilden Morden, village and civil parish in Cambridgeshire
  - See also Guilden Morden boar, Anglo-Saxon bronze figurine
- Guilden Sutton, village and civil parish in Cheshire
