= HMG =

HMG may refer to:

== Businesses and organisations ==
- His Majesty's Government (term), a Commonwealth state's executive
  - Government of Canada
  - Government of Gibraltar
  - Government of New Zealand
  - Government of the United Kingdom
- Holland Media Groep, Dutch TV broadcaster
- Human Media Group, American multi-channel network
- Hyundai Motor Group, South Korean car manufacturer

== Science and technology ==
- Heavy machine gun, a class of larger-caliber weapon
- High-mobility group, a group of proteins that act on DNA
- HMG-CoA, a metabolic intermediate biomolecule
- HMG Heat and Waterproof Adhesive
- Human menopausal gonadotrophin, a fertility drug
- Human Molecular Genetics, a scientific journal
