= Trivières =

Coordinates: 50°27′04″N 04°08′52″E

Trivières Triviere
- Village
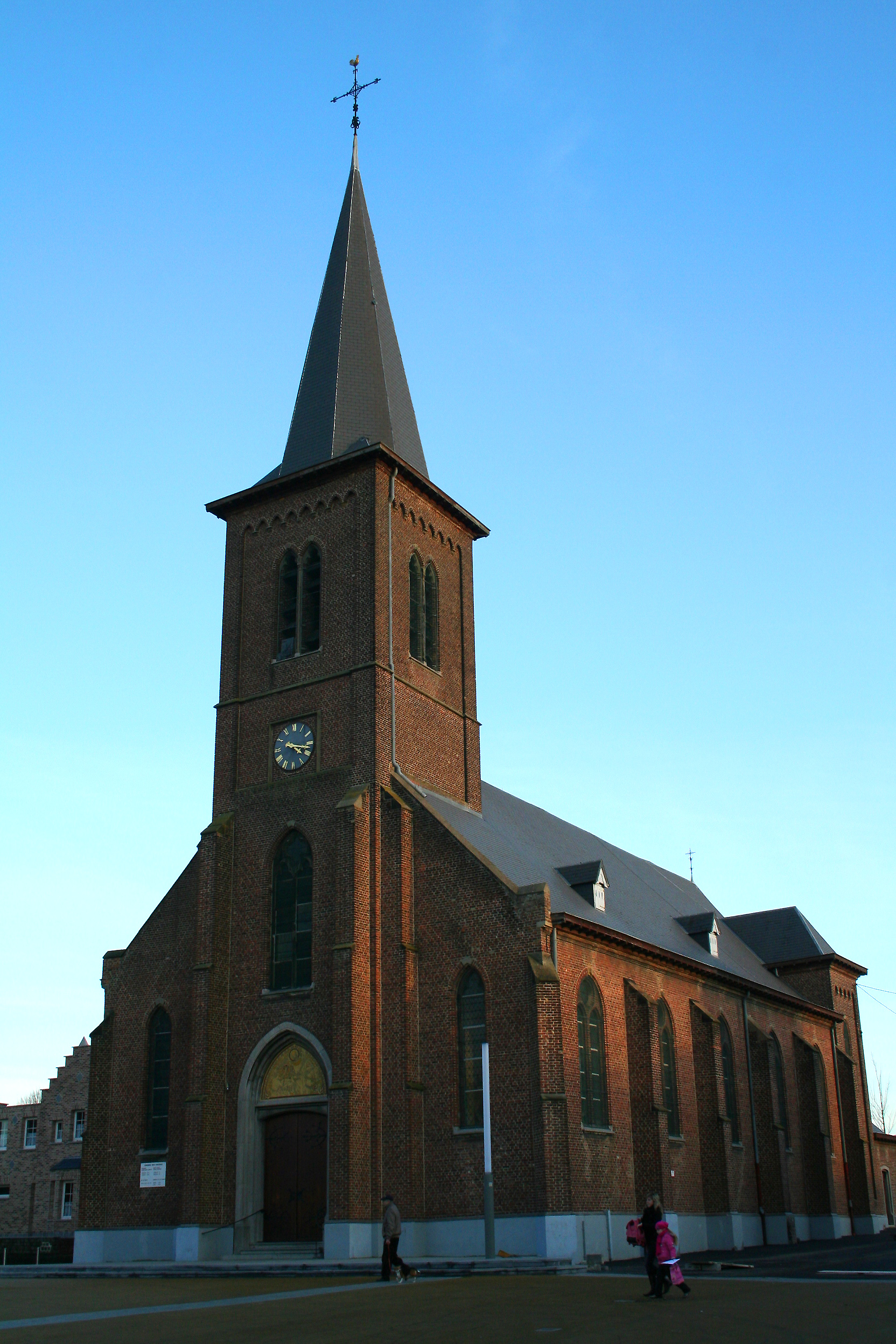
- Saint Martin's church.
- Etymology: Trivium; three paths
- Interactive map of Trivières
- Country: Belgium
- Region: Wallonia
- Province: Hainaut
- Arrondissement: La Louvière
- Municipality: La Louvière

Area
  - Total: 745 ha (1,840 acres)
- Elevation: 65.6 m (215 ft)

Population (2024)
  - Total: 3,883
  - Density: 521/km^{2} (1,350/sq mi)
- Time zone: UTC+1 (CET)
  - Summer (DST): UTC+2 (CEST)
- Postal code: 7100
- Area code: 064

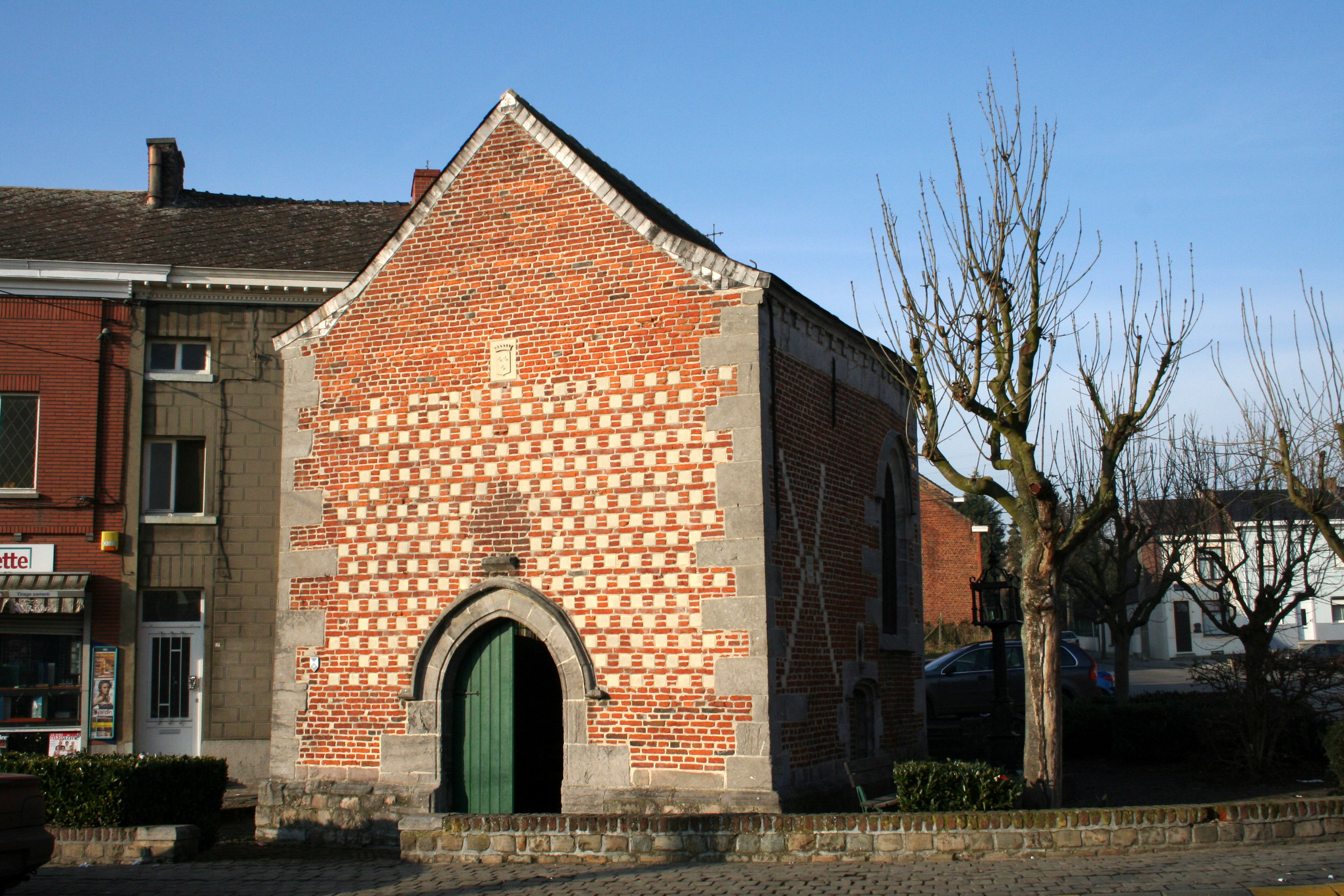
Chapel of Notre-Dame du Puits, 1664

Trivières (French pronunciation: [tʁivjɛʁ]; Walloon: Triviere) is a village of Wallonia and a district of the municipality of La Louvière, located in the province of Hainaut, Belgium.

It is located between Mons and Charleroi, about 35 miles (56 km) south of Brussels. It was a fully fledged municipality before the fusion of the Belgian municipalities. It is 731 hectares (1,810 acres) in size.

== Etymology ==
The origin of the name Trivières probably derives from the Latin word trivium, meaning three paths. Three roads intersect at the centre of Trivières, one leading east to Saint-Vlaast, one north to Strépy, and one southwest to Estinnes. Three rivers, the Haine, the Princess of Rieu, and the Estinnes, also cross the village. Another, probably legendary, suggested origin of the name is that it derives from the Belgic tribe Treveri, said to have been massacred in the area by the Roman legions of Tiberius and Nero Claudius Drusus.

== History ==
Trivières dates to at least the Roman era, and has a rich archaeological history. Excavations have uncovered an artificial harbour that was dug out by the Romans to facilitate the trade of lime, as well as a lime kiln. The village is also the site of the most important known Merovingian necropolis in Belgium, dating from 480 to 610 AD. A hectare in size, the cemetery contains 385 graves split between two sections, one reserved for women and one reserved for men. The former section has yielded skeletons buried with gold jewelry. The latter, containing larger tombs than those for the women, has been found to contain axes, fibulae, arrows, and spears. A Frankish iron helmet was also found there, similar in design to the Anglo-Saxon Shorwell helmet found on the Isle of Wight in England. The helmet is particularly rare in that it is made of iron, rather than bronze.

From 1400 to 1754 the main seigneury of Trivières was held by several prominent families, including some who traced their descent to the kings of Ireland. In the 18th century the ground began to be exploited for coal; the village also contained several breweries and a small construction store.

Today, Trivières is 731 hectares (1,810 acres) in size, and is part of the municipality of La Louvière. Trivières was itself a municipality until the fusion of the Belgian municipalities. Before it was restructured in the 1970s, it had a population of 3,635 people. Afterwards, in 1996, it had a population of 3,704 people.

In the centre of the town is the church of Saint Martin. It replaced a 12th century church demolished around 1870 to 1875.

== Bibliography ==
- Hood, Jamie; Ager, Barry; Williams, Craig; Harrington, Susan & Cartwright, Caroline (2012). "Investigating and interpreting an Early-to-Mid Sixth-Century Frankish Style Helmet" (PDF). The British Museum Technical Research Bulletin. 6. British Museum: 83–95. ISBN 978-1-904982-80-7.
