= HMG Heat and Waterproof Adhesive =

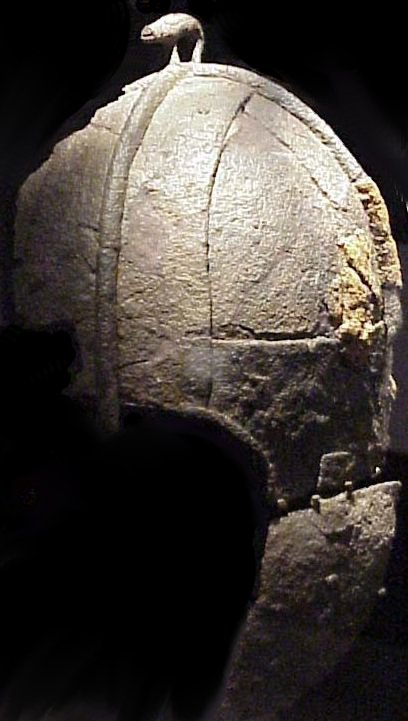
The 100–200 fragments of the Pioneer helmet were adhered using HMG.

HMG Heat and Waterproof Adhesive (also known as HMG or HMG adhesive) is a brand of cellulose nitrate adhesive manufactured by H Marcel Guest Ltd. It is one of the most popular cellulose nitrate adhesives used in conservation and restoration work, and is used on materials such as metal, wood, glass, and pottery. It is sometimes referred to as "the blue tube", in contrast to "the purple tube", the acrylic B72 Restoration Adhesive also manufactured by the company.

== Invention and use ==
HMG was invented during World War II by the company's founder, Herbert Falder. Today it is broadly used, including by the British Museum and the York Archaeological Trust. In 1997, HMG was used to adhere pieces of the Anglo-Saxon Pioneer helmet, which was found broken into between 100 and 200 fragments. Particularly fragile areas had their cracks injected with a solution of HMG diluted 50% with acetone, to consolidate them and prevent them from collapsing; holes made while cleaning away corrosion were likewise injected with pigmented HMG. Stronger areas, such as the sinister cheek guard, found in eighteen pieces, and the nasal, were joined directly with the adhesive. Finally, HMG was also used to adhere glass fibre matting on the inside of the helmet, strengthening weak joins and covering gaps, the latter to provide backing against which gapfill could be applied.

== Technical properties ==
HMG is advertised with a −18 °C (0 °F) flash point, and a 100 °C (212 °F) temperature resistance. It is insoluble in water and soluble in acetone, and is composed of 70% amyl acetate solvent, 25% cellulose nitrate, approximately 5% of the plasticizer dibutyl phthalate, and a small amount of a phenolic resin leveling agent. The adhesive is touch dry in five minutes, and hard dry in ten.

== Bibliography ==
- "Heat and Waterproof Adhesive". HMG Paints Ltd.
- "HMG Adhesive". Conservation and Art Materials Encyclopedia Online. Museum of Fine Arts, Boston. 1 May 2016.
- "HMG Paints Adhesives Tacky Products With A Worldwide Reputation". HMG Paints Ltd. 6 January 2011.
- Meadows, Ian (March 2004). "An Anglian Warrior Burial from Wollaston, Northamptonshire". Northamptonshire Archaeology Reports. 10 (110) (2010 digital ed.). Northamptonshire County Council.
- Read, Anthony (2006). "The conservation of the Wollaston Anglian helmet". In Smith, Robert Douglas (ed.). Make all sure: The conservation and restoration of arms and armour. Leeds: Basiliscoe Press. pp. 38–43. ISBN 0955162203.
- Shashoua, Yvonne; Bradley, Susan M. & Daniels, Vincent D. (May 1992). "Degradation of Cellulose Nitrate Adhesive". Studies in Conservation. 37 (2): 113–119. doi:10.2307/1506403. JSTOR 1506403.
