= Herbert Fordham =

English writer

Sir Herbert George Fordham (9 May 1854 – 1929), was a British writer on cartography whose Carto-Bibliography method of cataloging maps was widely adopted. He was the benefactor of the Fordham collection housed by the Royal Geographical Society - one of the most important map collections in the country.

Fordham was born in Odsey and attended University College, London where he became a member of the Geological Society. After college he joined the family brewing business but left and in 1885 was called to the bar by the Inner Temple.

Between 1874 and 1892 he published several papers on the geology, natural history, and botany of Cambridgeshire and Hertfordshire. In 1887 he published Rural Municipalities and the Reform of Local Government.

In 1891, on the death of his father, Fordham returned to the family business. From 1904 he served in local government, chairing Cambridgeshire County Council and receiving a knighthood in 1908. In 1918 he contested the West Fulham election as the Liberal candidate. He lost partly due to his opposition to conscription. Also in 1918, he was appointed High Sheriff of Cambridgeshire and Huntingdonshire. From 1920 he was deputy lieutenant of Cambridgeshire. He actively opposed the creation of the county borough of Cambridge.

From 1900 he began to collect old maps and road books, initially from England and later from abroad. Using both his own and the collections of others, he began publishing and printing on maps including Studies in Carto-Bibliography in 1914. In 1929 he was awarded the gold medal of the Brussels Geographical Society recognising him as one of Europe's foremost authorities on cartography.

Fordham donated some rare maps and atlases to both the British Museum and to Cambridge University Library and he bequeathed 1300 volumes, including rare road books and itineraries, to the Royal Geographical Society. He also donated the Anglo-Saxon Guilden Morden boar, discovered by his father, to the British Museum.

== Publications ==
- Fordham, Herbert George (1904). "A Small Bronze Object Found near Guilden Morden" (PDF). Proceedings of the Cambridge Antiquarian Society. X (4). Cambridge Antiquarian Society: 373–374, 404.
- Fordham, Herbert George (1909). Studies in carto-bibliography, British and French, and in the bibliography of itineraries and road-books. Oxford: Clarendon Press. Copy at Internet Archive.

== Bibliography ==
- "Fordham, Sir Herbert George (1854–1929)". Oxford Dictionary of National Biography (online ed.). Oxford University Press. doi:10.1093/ref:odnb/33200. (Subscription or UK public library membership required.)
- Whitaker, Allan (2006). "Fordham's Brewery". Brewers in Hertfordshire. Hertfordshire: University of Hertfordshire Press. pp. 42–46. ISBN 978-0954218973.
