= Shorwell helmet =

Sixth century Anglo-Saxon helmet found on the Isle of Wight

- The Shorwell helmet
- Material: Iron
- Created: 500–550 AD
- Discovered: 2004; Shorwell, Isle of Wight
- Present location: British Museum, London
- Registration: 2006,0305.67

The Shorwell helmet is an Anglo-Saxon helmet from the early to mid-sixth century AD found near Shorwell on the Isle of Wight in southern England. It was one of the grave goods of a high-status Anglo-Saxon warrior, and was found with other objects such as a pattern-welded sword and hanging bowl. One of only seven known Anglo-Saxon helmets, alongside the ones found at Benty Grange (1848), Sutton Hoo (1939), Yarm (1950), Coppergate (1982), Wollaston (1997), and Staffordshire (2009). It is the sole example to derive from the continental Frankish style rather than the contemporaneous Northern "crested helmets" used in England and Scandinavia.

The grave was discovered by members of a metal detecting club in May 2004, and excavated by archaeologists that November. Ploughing had destroyed much of the surrounding Anglo-Saxon cemetery, leaving this as the only individually identifiable grave. The helmet had fragmented into around 400 pieces, perhaps in part because of subsoiling, and was originally identified as a "fragmentary iron vessel". Only after it was acquired by the British Museum and reconstructed was it identified as a helmet. It remains in the museum's collection, but as of 2019 is not on display.

Exhibiting hardly any decoration other than a speculative exterior leather covering, the Shorwell helmet was a utilitarian fighting helmet. It was simply and sturdily designed out of eight pieces of riveted iron; its only decorative elements were paired with functional uses. The helmet's plainness belies its significance, for helmets were rare in Anglo-Saxon England, and appear to have been limited to the higher classes. The recovery of only six Anglo-Saxon helmets despite the excavation of thousands of graves suggests that their owners had some status.

== Description ==
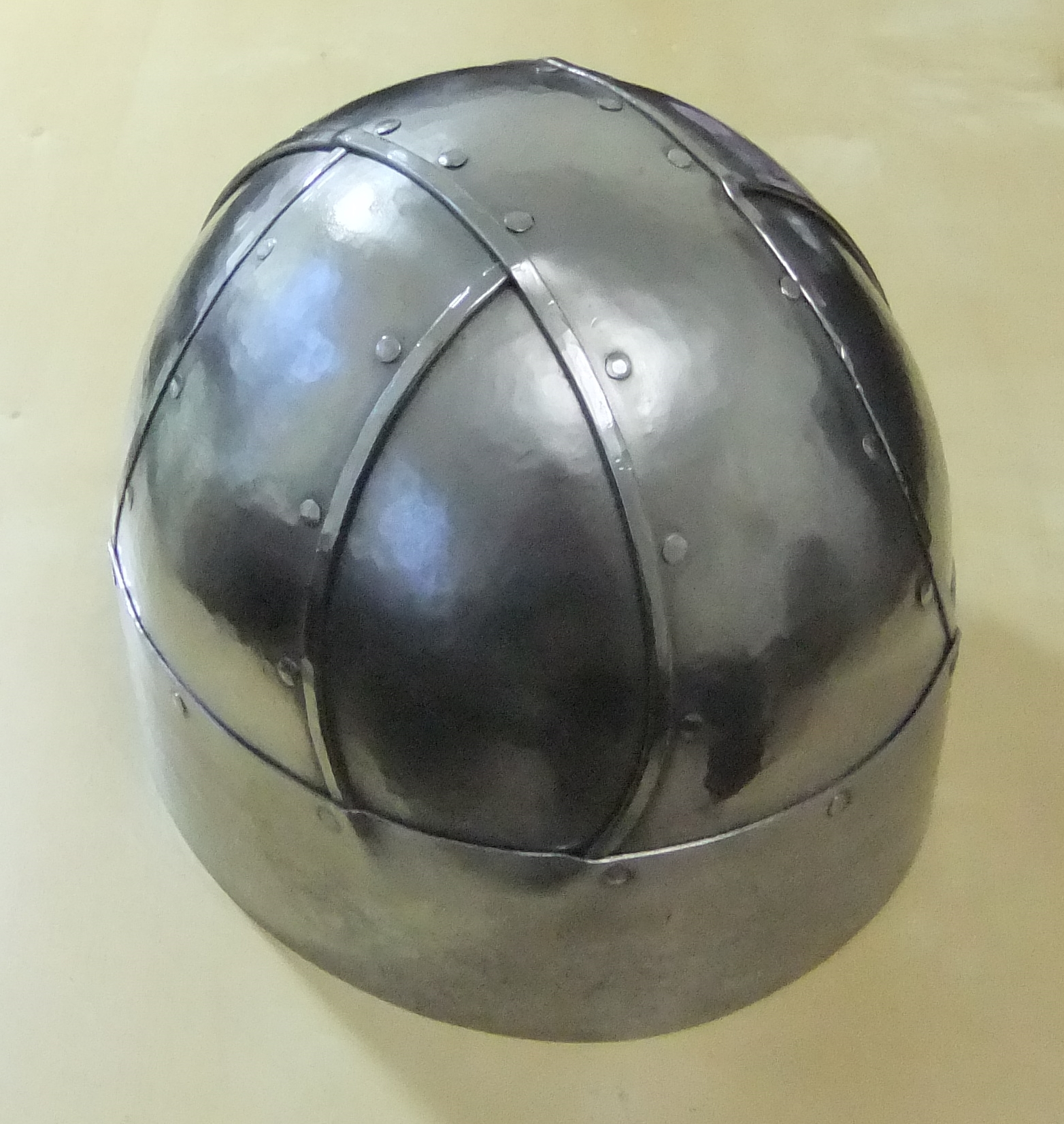
A replica of the Shorwell helmet

The helmet was constructed from eight pieces of iron riveted together. A brow band, 620 mm (24 in) long and 60 mm (2.4 in) wide, encircled the forehead, while a 340 mm (13 in) long nose-to-nape band ran from front to back, its surviving back end attached to the inside of the brow band by three rivets. Two 159 mm (6.3 in) long lateral bands extended from above the ears on the brow band to the top of the helmet, attaching to the inside by three rivets on either end. The nose-to-nape and lateral bands were narrowest at the top of the helmet, approximately 52 mm (2.0 in) and 40 mm (1.6 in) wide respectively, flaring outwards near the brow band to 150 mm (5.9 in) and 118 mm (4.6 in). Four subtriangular infill plates were riveted to the inside of the helmet to cover the remaining gaps. The gaps were almost symmetrical, indicating a particular degree of skill and foresight by its maker. Other than the join of the brow band, probably located at the back, the helmet was symmetrical.

With the possible exception of an exterior leather covering, the Shorwell helmet had very few decorative elements. The nose-to-nape and lateral bands featured thickened edges made by hammering the metal. These ridges may have been decorative, but they may also have been intended to serve as "stop-ribs", preventing edged weapons such as swords from glancing downwards and striking the wearer on the shoulders or face. Three copper alloy rivets are found on the dexter side of the brow band, surrounded by what may be skin product. These may have functioned to hold an attachment strap, or a cheek guard made of something like cuir bouilli. The use of copper alloy rivets, instead of the iron ones used on the rest of the helmet, may reflect a decorative effect reserved for a non-structural element. It is possible that the exterior of the helmet may have been covered in leather or cloth, a decoration possibly indicated on other Frankish helmets, but it is too badly deteriorated for this to be determined. Any such leather could itself have been decorated; the leather or skin coverings of some contemporary scabbards and sheaths exhibit impressed designs or patterns raised in relief.

A helmet lining is uncertain, but is possibly indicated by traces of skin product on the interior. The exact nature of the skin product, let alone its purpose, is considered ambiguous, and part of it may have been used in relation to a cheek guard. Leather linings have also been suggested for some Late Roman and Anglo-Saxon helmets, which could also explain some of the traces in the Shorwell example. If so, this would likely have been used in conjunction with removable padding to increase comfort and protection.

=== Typology ===
The Shorwell helmet is dated to approximately 500–550 AD, based on comparisons with similar helmets and the associated grave goods. It is one of only six Anglo-Saxon helmets known, but it represents a different tradition; the Benty Grange, Sutton Hoo, Coppergate, Wollaston, and Staffordshire helmets are all examples of the "crested helmets" known in Northern Europe from the sixth through the eleventh centuries, whereas the Shorwell helmet is of the continental Frankish style. Other sixth-century helmets found in Trivières, Belgium, and in Bretzenheim, Germany, appear almost identical. Their construction includes a continuous lateral band in addition to the continuous nose-to-nape band, and a two-piece construction underneath rather than an infill plate for each of the four gaps, potentially an indication of regional variation. Like the northern crested helmets, the continental Frankish examples appear to be derivatives of the Late Roman ridge helmets used in Europe during the fourth and fifth centuries AD.

=== Function ===
The Shorwell helmet is a barely decorated utilitarian piece. Its only decorative elements are paired with serviceable uses—the flared ends and raised edges of the nose-to-nape and lateral bands are aesthetically pleasing while strengthening the helmet with large overlaps and providing protection from glancing blows, while the three copper alloy rivets were used in association with a strap or cheek flap—suggesting a "fighting helmet" above all. It is simple yet well made and effective, and strong; one of the fragments that has survived best is from the crown of the helmet, where seven pieces of metal overlap in what was intended to be the strongest place.

Helmets were rare in Anglo-Saxon England, and though utilitarian, the Shorwell helmet signified the high status of its owner. Such protection certainly seems to have been among the armament of the well heeled. In the contemporary epic Beowulf, a poem about kings and nobles, they are relatively common, while the helmeted Vendel and Valsgärde graves from the same period in Sweden, thought to be the burials of wealthy non-royals, suggest that helmets were not solely for the use of the absolute élite. Yet thousands of furnished Anglo-Saxon graves have been excavated since the start of the 19th century and helmets remain rare; although this could partly reflect poor rates of artefact survival or even recognition, their extreme scarcity indicates that they were never deposited in great numbers.

== Discovery ==
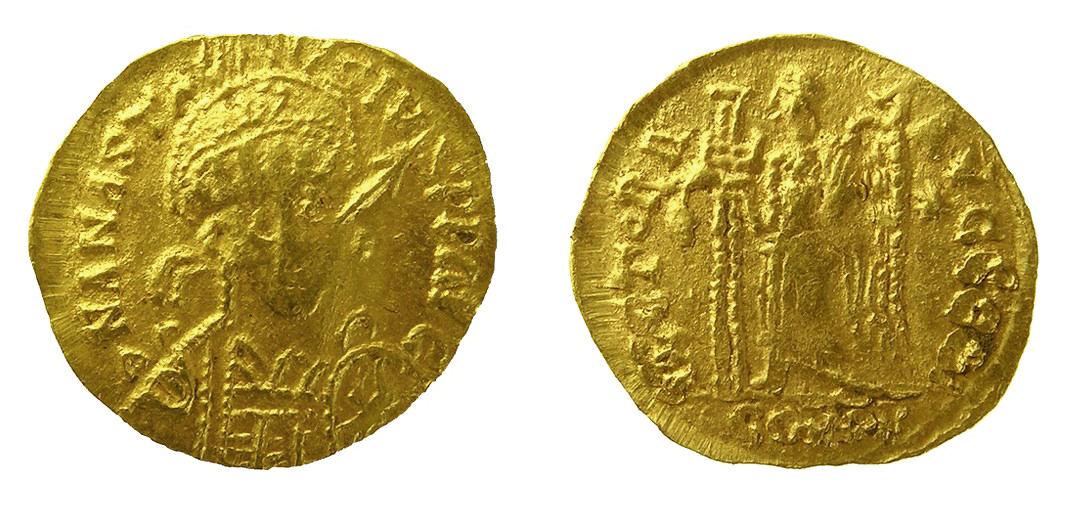
A copy of a Roman solidus discovered in 2007 that may have originally been buried in the same grave as the helmet

The helmet was discovered in November 2004 near Shorwell, a village on the Isle of Wight. The Isle of Wight Metal Detecting Club had discovered Anglo-Saxon grave goods that May, and reported the finds as required by law. Plough-related subsoiling had severely damaged the graves, leaving only one identifiable. The Isle of Wight Archaeology and Historic Environment Service excavated the grave and found evidence of a high-status male warrior from the early- to mid-sixth century. At the head of the grave were strewn some 400 fragments of iron, initially identified as a "fragmentary iron vessel".

Excavations revealed that the warrior had also been inhumed with other items. An iron pattern-welded sword lay lengthwise next to a copper alloy buckle possibly from a sword belt; the sword's silver pommel and scabbard mouthpiece, which was made of gilded copper alloy, were found in the topsoil nearby. Also found were a shield boss with extended grip, the socket of a broken spearhead, a fluted glass vessel, two pieces of flint, and hanging bowl fragments with bird-shaped mounts. Nearby, and close enough to be considered plough scatter, were a square gold mount inlaid with glass and garnet, and, found in 2007, a gold Merovingian or Burgundian copy of a Roman solidus depicting the Eastern Roman Emperor Anastasius I. Although Anastasius I ruled from 491 to 518 AD, the coin is a copy minted in Gaul, modern day France, probably around 500 to 580.

The Isle of Wight Museum Service initially expressed interest in obtaining the finds before withdrawing, and the British Museum acquired the objects in 2006. The Treasure Valuation Committee, which appraises finds falling under the scope of the Treasure Act 1996, valued the entire find—believing the helmet to be a broken vessel—at £3,800. Subsequent finds from the area, such as the gold solidus, have also been acquired by the museum.

=== Restoration ===
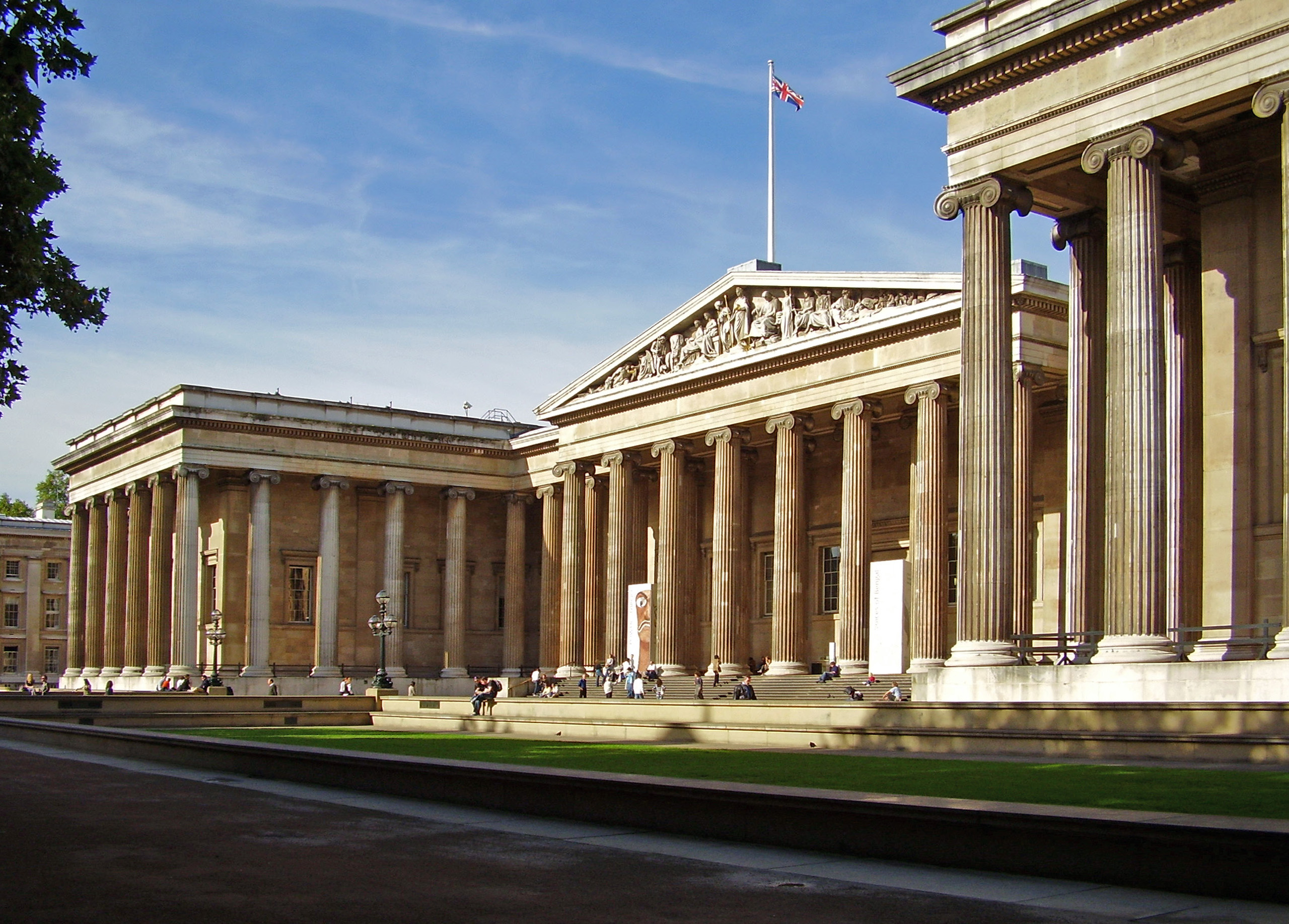
The British Museum in London now owns the Shorwell helmet.

The "fragmentary iron vessel" was conserved at the British Museum. It had been located close to where the head of the body would have been, and was reconstructed on the chance that it might be a helmet. In this manner it joined the Roman helmet from Burgh Castle, mislabelled for two decades as "cauldron fragments", the Anglo-Saxon Pioneer helmet, first labelled a "bucket", and the Anglo-Saxon Coppergate helmet, thought at first to be a rock. The fragments were extensively corroded as well as distorted, complicating the restoration; layers of metal had also delaminated in places, requiring that the layers be adhered before they could be joined to adjacent fragments along the broken edges. The pieces were only lightly cleaned to preserve traces of organic remains, and X-rays were first used to sort the fragments by density and curvature. Approximately two-thirds of the helmet was then assembled and adhered, proving it for what it was. The unincorporated fragments were insufficient to account for the missing third of the helmet, suggesting that it had been damaged by ploughing.

The Shorwell helmet is in the collection of the British Museum. As of 2025 it is not on display.

== Context ==
=== Grave goods ===
During the early- to mid-sixth century, the Shorwell helmet was interred in the burial of a high-status male warrior. In this period, burials were often accompanied by items including joints of meat, pottery and metal vessels, and in certain cases weaponry. Weapon burials from the fifth and sixth centuries typically included a spear, shield, and sword, and more rarely other weapons, such as axes and arrow-heads. By the seventh century, new types of weapons—such as seaxes and shields with sugar-loaf bosses—were increasingly popular items placed in graves. The choice of items placed in a grave could convey information about the status, wealth, sex, age, and tribal affiliation of the deceased. Broad analysis of graves from the Early Anglo-Saxon period indicates that weapons were overwhelmingly associated with male burials and served as symbols of masculinity; it is extremely rare to find female burials from this time given weapons.

=== The Isle of Wight ===
The Isle of Wight is located on the northern side of the English Channel, approximately 3 km (1.9 mi) off the coast of Great Britain. To the southwest of the island is Shorwell, a small village that has seen evidence of human activity since the Paleolithic, including settlement during the Roman occupation of Britain. The sixth-century helmet found nearby fits within the Early Middle Ages, a period of time once known as the Dark Ages for the paucity of its written record. Two works, supplemented by the finds of archaeologists, are responsible for illuminating the second half of the first millennium in Britain at all, and for suggesting the genesis of the Anglo-Saxon occupation of the Isle of Wight: the Anglo-Saxon Chronicle, a collection of annals recording the history of the Anglo-Saxons, and the Ecclesiastical History of the English People, written by the English monk Bede.

Decades of Germanic invasions preceded the Roman withdrawal from Britain in 410 AD, and decades of invasions followed. Near the middle of the fifth century the invasions begot a degree of permanent Germanic control, when according to a legend that is perhaps grounded in rudimentary fact, the mercenary brothers Hengist and Horsa, recruited from the Germanic tribes by a British king, turned against him, plundered the island, and established rule in Kent. At some time, according to an assertion made by Bede and backed up by similarities in the grave goods, the Kentish population seems to have also formed a settlement on the Isle of Wight and another across the Solent, near Southampton Water. A story in the Chronicle traces the conquest of the island to Cerdic, said to be the king of Wessex from 519 to 534 AD and to whom the British royal family still traces its lineage, in 530 AD. Yet Cerdic's putative conquest is even more dubious than his already-questioned existence, and may be a seventh-century tale sprung from political rivalries. What is known is that Kent at the time was the technological hub of Britain and the bridgehead through which trade from the continent flowed, and that its sixth-century connection with the Isle of Wight supplied the latter with goods and visitors from across the Channel. This state of affairs may account for the goods found in the Shorwell grave, or even the person who was buried with them.

== Bibliography ==
- Ager, Barry (October 2006). "West Wight, Isle of Wight: Anglo-Saxon Grave Assemblages (2004 T187)". Treasure Annual Report 2004 (PDF). London: Department for Culture, Media and Sport. pp. 68–71.
- Ager, Barry & Abdy, Richard (November 2009). "West Wight, Isle of Wight (addenda): 110 Gold, Silver, Copper-Alloy and Non-Metal Finds from a Group of Dispersed Anglo-Saxon Grave Assemblages (PAS: IOW-244C13; Treasure: 2007 T203)" (PDF). Portable Antiquities and Treasure Annual Report 2007. London: Department of Portable Antiquities and Treasure, British Museum. pp. 93–96. ISBN 978-0-9563795-1-1.
- Blair, Peter Hunter (2003). An Introduction to Anglo-Saxon England (3rd ed.). Cambridge: Cambridge University Press. ISBN 978-0-521-53777-3.
- Butterworth, Jenni; Fregni, Giovanna; Fuller, Kayleigh & Greaves, Pieta (2016). "The Importance of Multidisciplinary Work Within Archaeological Conservation Projects: Assembly of the Staffordshire Hoard Die-Impressed Sheets". Journal of the Institute of Conservation. 39 (1): 29–43. doi:10.1080/19455224.2016.1155071.
- Cameron, Ester A. (2000). Sheaths and Scabbards in England AD 400–1100. British Archaeological Reports. Vol. 301. ISBN 978-1-84171-065-5.
- Cooke, Nicholas (March 2009). "Cheverton Down Wind Farm, Shorwell, Isle of Wight: Archaeological Evaluation Report" (PDF). Wessex Archaeology Reports. 71250 (1).
- "helmet". The British Museum Collection Online. The British Museum.
- Hodgkin, Robert Howard (1952). A History of the Anglo-Saxons. Vol. I (3rd ed.). London: Oxford University Press.
- Hood, Jamie; Ager, Barry; Williams, Craig; Harrington, Susan & Cartwright, Caroline (2012). Investigating and interpreting an Early-to-Mid Sixth-Century Frankish Style Helmet (PDF). The British Museum Technical Research Bulletin. Vol. 6. British Museum. pp. 83–95. ISBN 978-1-904982-80-7.
- James, Simon (1986). "Evidence from Dura Europos for the Origins of Late Roman Helmets". Syria. LXIII (1–2): 107–134. doi:10.3406/syria.1986.6923. JSTOR 4198539.
- Johnson, Stephen (1980). "A Late Roman Helmet from Burgh Castle". Britannia. XI: 303–312. doi:10.2307/525684. JSTOR 525684.
- Lucy, Sam (2000). The Anglo-Saxon Way of Death: Burial Rites in Early England. Stroud: Sutton Publishing. ISBN 978-0-7509-2103-9.
- Rambaran-Olm, Mary R. (2010). "'Dark Ages'". In Bjork, Robert E. (ed.). The Oxford Dictionary of the Middle Ages. Oxford: Oxford University Press. pp. 484–485. doi:10.1093/acref/9780198662624.001.0001. ISBN 978-0-19-866262-4.
- Read, Anthony (2006). "The Conservation of the Wollaston Anglian Helmet". In Smith, Robert Douglas (ed.). Make All Sure: The Conservation and Restoration of Arms and Armour. Leeds: Basiliscoe Press. pp. 38–43. ISBN 978-0-9551622-0-6.
- "Record ID: IOW-D7CB55 – EARLY MEDIEVAL coin". Portable Antiquities Scheme. 24 February 2011.
- Steuer, Heiko (1987). "Helm und Ringschwert: Prunkbewaffnung und Rangabzeichen germanischer Krieger" [Helmet and Ring-Sword: Ornamental Weapons and Insignia of Germanic Warriors]. In Häßler, Hans-Jürgen (ed.). Studien zur Sachsenforschung [Studies in Saxon Research] (in German). Vol. 6. Hildesheim: Lax. pp. 189–236. ISBN 3-7848-1617-7.
- Stjerna, Knut (1912). Essays on Questions Connected with the Old English Poem of Beowulf. Extra Series. Vol. III. Translated by Hall, John Richard Clark. London: Viking Club: Society for Northern Research.
- Stoodley, Nick (1999). The Spindle and the Spear: A Critical Enquiry into the Construction and Meaning of Gender in the Early Anglo-Saxon Burial Rite. BAR British Series 288. Oxford: British Archaeological Reports. ISBN 978-1-84171-117-1.
- Taylor, Alison (2001). Burial Practice in Early England. Stroud: Tempus. ISBN 978-0-7524-1487-4.
- Tweddle, Dominic (1992). The Anglian Helmet from 16–22 Coppergate. The Archaeology of York. Vol. 17/8. London: Council for British Archaeology. ISBN 1-872414-19-2. Archived from the original on 21 March 2024.
- "Valuations". Treasure Annual Report 2004 (PDF). London: Department for Culture, Media and Sport. October 2006. pp. 214–217.

=== Associated objects ===
- "coin". The British Museum Collection Online. The British Museum.
- "mount / belt". The British Museum Collection Online. The British Museum.
- "shield". The British Museum Collection Online. The British Museum.
- "sword". The British Museum Collection Online. The British Museum.
- "sword". The British Museum Collection Online. The British Museum.
