= Ian Meadows (archaeologist) =

British archaeologist

- Born: Ian David Meadows; January 5, 1959 (age 67)
- Occupation: Archaeologist
- Known for: Archaeology work; discovery of the Pioneer helmet

Ian David Meadows (born 5 January 1959) is a British archaeologist. He has worked in archaeology for some 40 years, including as a Senior Project Officer at Northamptonshire Archaeology from 1992 to 2014. During that time he excavated a number of large quarries in England and Wales, and excavated the boar-crested Anglo-Saxon Pioneer Helmet in addition to discovering the first definitive evidence for viticulture in Roman Britain. He has also worked for the Museum of London Archaeology, and has taught archaeology and landscape history for Cambridge University, Anglia Ruskin University, the University of Bath, and the Workers' Educational Association.

== Career ==
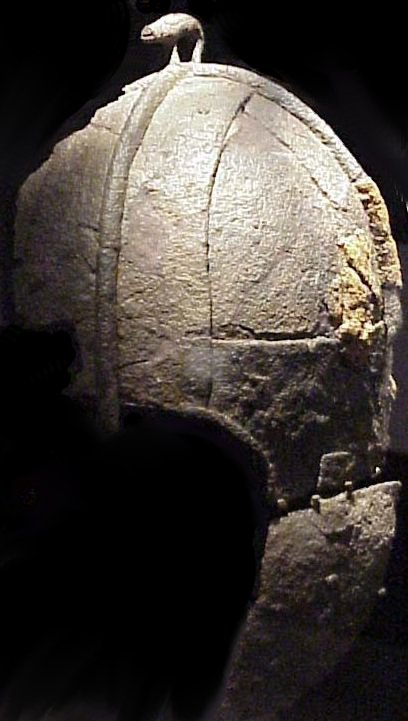
The Pioneer Helmet was discovered by Meadows in 1997.

Ian David Meadows was born on 5 January 1959. He has worked in archaeology for approximately 40 years. From 1992 to 2014 he worked with Northamptonshire Archaeology as Senior Project Officer, during which time he directed many projects, particularly the excavations of large landscapes in English and Welsh quarries. Starting in about 1993 Meadows began digging in a gravel pit in Wollaston, Northamptonshire, ultimately leading to both the discovery of the first definitive evidence of viticulture from Roman Britain, and the unearthing of the Pioneer Helmet, only the fourth Anglo-Saxon helmet to be found.

In 1996, while leading a team with Tony Brown of the University of Exeter's School of Geography and Archaeology, Meadows discovered the first evidence for viticulture from Roman Britain. The find followed the excavation of a series of farms from the Iron and Roman ages, and was soon followed by the discovery of vineyards in the Nene Valley. By 1999 Meadows had found evidence of seven vineyards: four in Northamptonshire, one in Cambridgeshire, one in Lincolnshire and one in Buckinghamshire. One site alone had four miles of trenches, enough to produce about 10,000 litres of wine annually. The seven vineyards covered a combined 30 acres, suggesting to Meadows that "research may yet reveal that Britain was a major wine producer in ancient times."

The year after discovering the Roman vineyards, in 1997 Meadows discovered the Anglo-Saxon Pioneer Helmet. Also found in Wollaston, it was part of the inhumation of a high-status Anglo-Saxon man, and was found with a pattern welded sword and a hanging bowl. News of the find made newspapers as far away as Australia and New Zealand, for the helmet was only the fourth contemporaneous example to be discovered, coming after those from Benty Grange, Sutton Hoo, and York, and before two subsequent discoveries from Shorwell and Staffordshire.

As of 2016, Meadows is leading the excavations at Chester Farm, a walled Roman town with 10,000 years of history. It has evidence dating back to the Mesolithic, Iron and Medieval ages, as well as farm buildings from the 17th century. He has 4 children.

== Publications ==
- Meadows, Ian (November 1996). "Wollaston: The Nene Valley, A British Moselle?". Current Archaeology. 13 (150): 212–215. ISSN 0011-3212.
- Brown, Anthony G.; Meadows, Ian (1996–97). "Environmental analysis of a Neolithic/early Bronze Age palaeochannel from Turnells Mill Lane, Wellingborough in the Nene valley". Northamptonshire Archaeology. 27. Northamptonshire Archaeological Society: 185–191.
- Meadows, Ian (1996–97). "The Pioneer Helmet". Northamptonshire Archaeology. 27. Northamptonshire Archaeological Society: 191–193.
- Webster, Leslie & Meadows, Ian (July–August 1997). "Discovery of Anglo-Saxon Helmet helmet with Boar Crest". Minerva. 8 (4): 3–5.
- Meadows, Ian (September 1997). "Wollaston: The 'Pioneer' Burial". Current Archaeology. 13 (154): 391–395. ISSN 0011-3212.
- Meadows, Ian (Autumn–Winter 1997). "The Pioneer Helmet: A Dark-Age Princely Burial from Northamptonshire". Medieval Life (8): 2–4. ISSN 1357-6291.
- Brown, Anthony G.; Meadows, Ian; Turner, Simon D. & Mattingly, David (December 2001). "Roman Vineyards in Britain: Stratigraphic and Palynological Data from Wollaston in the Nene Valley, England". Antiquity. 75 (290): 745–757. doi:10.1017/S0003598X00089250. S2CID 162925754.
- Meadows, Ian (March 2004). "An Anglian Warrior Burial from Wollaston, Northamptonshire". Northamptonshire Archaeology Reports. 10 (110) (2010 digital ed.). Northamptonshire County Council.
- Meadows, Ian (Winter 2006). "Environmental sampling and the evolution of the Nene Valley" (PDF). The Archaeologist (59). Institute of Field Archaeologists: 15.

== Bibliography ==
- Brown, Anthony G.; Meadows, Ian; Turner, Simon D. & Mattingly, David (December 2001). "Roman Vineyards in Britain: Stratigraphic and Palynological Data from Wollaston in the Nene Valley, England". Antiquity. 75 (290): 745–757. doi:10.1017/S0003598X00089250. S2CID 162925754.
- Butterworth, Jenni; Fregni, Giovanna; Fuller, Kayleigh & Greaves, Pieta (2016). "The importance of multidisciplinary work within archaeological conservation projects: assembly of the Staffordshire Hoard die-impressed sheets". Journal of the Institute of Conservation. 39 (1): 29–43. doi:10.1080/19455224.2016.1155071.
- "Ian Meadows". Chester Farm. Northamptonshire County Council. Archived from the original on 2017-09-21.
- Keys, David (16 November 1999). "Veni, Vidi, Viticulture – Remains of Roman Vineyards Found in UK". The Independent.
- Meadows, Ian (November 1996). "Wollaston: The Nene Valley, A British Moselle?". Current Archaeology. 13 (150): 212–215. ISSN 0011-3212.
- Meadows, Ian (September 1997). "Wollaston: The 'Pioneer' Burial". Current Archaeology. 13 (154): 391–395. ISSN 0011-3212.
- "Ian Meadows". Our Team. Andrew Josephs Associates.
- Read, Anthony (2006). "The conservation of the Wollaston Anglian helmet". In Smith, Robert Douglas (ed.). Make all sure: The conservation and restoration of arms and armour. Leeds: Basiliscoe Press. pp. 38–43. ISBN 978-0-9551622-0-6.
- Registrar of Companies for England and Wales (19 September 2014), Certificate of Incorporation of Ian Meadows Archaeology Limited, Cardiff: Companies House
- Saraceni, Jessica E. (November–December 1997). "Saxon Helmet Restored". Archaeology. 50 (6). ISSN 0003-8113.
- Schuster, Angela M. H. (March–April 2000). "Wine Lover's Guide to Ancient Britain". Archaeology. 53 (2). ISSN 0003-8113.
- Scott, Chris (11 February 2011a). "Ian Meadows on Ancient English Wine Drinking". Thirty Fifty. Archived from the original on 7 May 2018.
- Scott, Chris (17 February 2011b). "UK Wine Show 245 Ian Meadows on Roman Vineyards in the UK". Thirty Fifty. Archived from the original on 6 May 2018.
