= Jennifer Foster =

English scholar

- Born: England
- Occupations: Archaeologist, scholar
- Employer: University of Reading
- Known for: Prehistoric and medieval archaeology; study of metalwork artifacts
- Spouse: Martin Bell

Academic work
- Discipline: Archaeology
- Sub-discipline: Prehistoric and Medieval Archaeology, Artifact Studies, Metalwork
- Institutions: British Museum, Ashmolean Museum, University of Reading
- Main interests: Metalwork, Iron Age and Roman Britain
- Notable works: Bronze Boar Figurines in Iron Age and Roman Britain, The Lexden Tumulus, Life and Death in the Iron Age, The Iron Age Moulds from Gussage All Saints

Jennifer Foster is an English scholar of prehistoric and medieval archaeology, who specializes in the study of artifacts, particularly metalwork.

== Career ==
Foster is a scholar of prehistoric and medieval archaeology, who specializes in the study of artifacts. She formerly worked at the British Museum, and at the University of Oxford's Ashmolean Museum. She teaches at the University of Reading. For the last 30 years she has taught archaeology to continuing education students at the university, with classes such as "The Ethics of Archaeology" and "The Legend and Archaeology of King Arthur." She has given talks on subjects such as experimental archaeology, and Sutton Hoo.

== Personal life ==
Foster is married to Martin Bell, a professor of archaeological science at the University of Reading.

== Publications ==
In addition to a number of articles and chapters, Foster has written four monographs, including one on Iron Age and Roman boar figurines, one on the Lexden tumulus, and one an introduction to European archaeology before the Roman conquest, based on the collection in the British Ashmolean Museum.

Foster's first book, Bronze Boar Figurines in Iron Age and Roman Britain, described and illustrated 22 examples of bronze boars from the Iron Age and Roman Britain, and described the animal's millennia-long role in European cultures; a related article that came out the same year, "A Boar Figurine from Guilden Morden, Cambs.", detailed the Guilden Morden boar, a sixth- or seventh-century Anglo-Saxon copper alloy figure of a boar that may have once served as the crest of a helmet. In a 1995 article she argued that Iron Age smiths creating high quality metalwork in Britain might have travelled around stopping at different sites, rather than having a fixed abode, and would produce multiple pieces at each site, as at Gussage All Saints, Dorset.

=== Books ===
- Foster, Jennifer (1977b). "Bronze Boar Figurines in Iron Age and Roman Britain". British Archaeological Reports. 39. ISBN 978-0-904531-74-9.
- Foster, Jennifer (1980). The Iron Age Moulds from Gussage All Saints. Occasional Papers. Vol. 12. London: British Museum. ISBN 0-86159-011-2.
- Foster, Jennifer (1986). "The Lexden Tumulus: A Re-Appraisal of an Iron Age Burial from Colchester, Essex". British Archaeological Reports. 156. ISBN 0-86054-408-7.
- Foster, Jennifer (2002). Life and Death in the Iron Age. Oxford: Ashmolean Museum. ISBN 1-85444-179-5.

=== Chapters ===
- Foster, Jennifer (1993). "The identification of male and female graves using grave goods". In Struck, Manuela (ed.). Römerzeitliche Gräber als Quellen zu Religion, Bevölkerungsstruktur und Sozialgeschichte: internationale Fachkonferenz vom 18.-20. Februar 1991 im Institut für Vor- und Frühgeschichte der Johannes Gutenberg-Universität Mainz. Archäologische Schriften des Institut für Vor- und Frühgeschichte der Johannes Gutenberg-Universität Mainz. Vol. 3. Mainz: Institut für Vor- und Frühgeschichte der Johannes Gutenberg-Universität Mainz. pp. 207–212. ISBN 3-928957-02-3.

=== Articles ===
- Foster, Jennifer (1977a). "Notes and News: A Boar Figurine from Guilden Morden, Cambs" (PDF). Medieval Archaeology. XXI. Society for Medieval Archaeology: 166–167. doi:10.5284/1000320.
  - Images on plate XIV
- Foster, Jennifer (1990). "Copper alloy objects; Other Bronze Age artefacts". Brean Down Excavations 1983–1987 (PDF). By Bell, Martin. Archaeological Reports. Vol. 15. Swindon: English Heritage. pp. 150–151, 158–175. ISBN 1-85074-268-5.
- Foster, Jennifer (1993). "Iron Age copper alloy objects". Beeston Castle, Cheshire: Excavations by Laurence Keen & Peter Hough, 1968–85 (PDF). By Ellis, Peter. Archaeological Reports. Vol. 23. Swindon: English Heritage. pp. 50–53. ISBN 1-85074-429-7.
- Foster, Jennifer (1995). "Metalworking in the British Iron Age: The Evidence from Weelsby Avenue, Grimsby". In Raftery, Barry; Megaw, Vincent & Rigby, Val (eds.). Sites and Sights of the Iron Age: Essays on Fieldwork and Museum Research Presented to Ian Mathieson Stead. Oxbow Monographs in Archaeology. Vol. 56. Oxford: Oxbow. pp. 49–61. ISBN 1-900188-00-7.
- Foster, Jennifer (1999). "The Funerary Finds". The Excavation of a Ceremonial Site at Folly Lane, Verulamium (PDF). By Niblett, Rosalind. Britannia Monograph Series. Vol. 14. London: Society for the Promotion of Roman Studies. pp. 133–176. ISBN 0-907764-23-1.
- Foster, Jennifer (2000). "14 sections". Cadbury Castle, Somerset: The later prehistoric and early historic archaeology (PDF). By Barrett, John C.; Freeman, P. W. M.; Woodward, Ann. Archaeological Reports. Vol. 20. Swindon: English Heritage. pp. 143–147, 186, 192–197, 227–228, 233–242, 247–248, 262. ISBN 1-85074-716-4.

- Includes "Copper alloy objects (excluding brooches)" (pp. 143–147), "Iron and copper alloy needles" (p. 186), "Copper alloy bracelets" (p. 192), "Copper alloy pins" (pp. 192–194), "Copper alloy rings" (p. 194), "Composite rings" (pp. 194–196), "Copper alloy buttons and dress fasteners" (p. 196), "Copper alloy sheet" (pp. 196–197), "Possible mirror" (p. 197), "Metal containers and container fittings: copper alloy" (pp. 227–228), "Harness equipment" (pp. 233–235), "Violence" (pp. 235–242), "Stone, clay, and copper alloy weighing equipment" (pp. 247–248), "Coral" (p. 262)

- Foster, Jennifer (2000). "An Iron Age Boundary and Settlement Features at Slade Farm, Bicester, Oxfordshire: a Report on Excavations, 1996: Metalwork" (PDF). Oxoniensia. LXV. Oxford: Oxfordshire Architectural and Historical Society: 249–252. ISSN 0308-5562.
- Foster, Jennifer (2013). "Stone artefacts [from Redwick]". The Bronze Age in the Severn Estuary. By Bell, Martin. CBA Research Reports. Vol. 172. York: Council for British Archaeology. pp. 92–93. ISBN 978-1-902771-94-6.
- Foster, Jennifer (2013). "Bone artefact [from Redwick]". The Bronze Age in the Severn Estuary. By Bell, Martin. CBA Research Reports. Vol. 172. York: Council for British Archaeology. p. 94. ISBN 978-1-902771-94-6.
- Foster, Jennifer & Ingrem, Claire (2013). "Cut marks and gnawed bones [from Redwick]". The Bronze Age in the Severn Estuary. By Bell, Martin. CBA Research Reports. Vol. 172. York: Council for British Archaeology. p. 143. ISBN 978-1-902771-94-6.
- Foster, Jennifer (2013). "Decorated wooden shaft inside a hollowed-out bone [from Peterstone]". The Bronze Age in the Severn Estuary. By Bell, Martin. CBA Research Reports. Vol. 172. York: Council for British Archaeology. pp. 192–193. ISBN 978-1-902771-94-6.
- Foster, Jennifer (2013). "Bone artefacts [from Peterstone]". The Bronze Age in the Severn Estuary. By Bell, Martin. CBA Research Reports. Vol. 172. York: Council for British Archaeology. pp. 220–223. ISBN 978-1-902771-94-6.
- Foster, Jennifer & Ingrem, Claire (2013). "Cut marks and gnawed bones [from Peterstone]". The Bronze Age in the Severn Estuary. By Bell, Martin. CBA Research Reports. Vol. 172. York: Council for British Archaeology. pp. 246–248. ISBN 978-1-902771-94-6.
- Foster, Jennifer (2014). "Hidden Faces and Animal Images on Late Iron Age and Early Roman Horse Harness Decorated Using the Champlevé Technique". In Gosden, Chris; Crawford, Sally & Ulmschneider, Katharina (eds.). Celtic Art in Europe: Making Connections. Oxford: Oxbow Books. pp. 56–67. doi:10.2307/j.ctvh1dqs8.9. ISBN 978-1-78297-655-4. JSTOR j.ctvh1dqs8.9.

=== Reviews ===
- Foster, Jennifer (November 1992). "Review of Camerton: the Late Iron Age and Early Roman Metalwork". Britannia. XXIII. Society for the Promotion of Roman Studies: 365–366. doi:10.2307/526140. JSTOR 526140. S2CID 163310018.
- Foster, Jennifer (May 1995). "Review of Iron Age and Roman Salt Production and the Medieval Town of Droitwi". Urban History. 22 (1). Cambridge University Press: 143–144. doi:10.1017/S0963926800011445.

== Bibliography ==
- Bell, Martin & Walker, Michael J. C. (2005). Late Quaternary Environmental Change: Physical and Human Perspectives. London: Routledge. ISBN 978-0-13-033344-5.
- Howard, Beverley (June 2019). "Sutton Hoo Talk" (PDF). Archaeology in Marlow. 18 (3): 5–6. Archived from the original (PDF) on 6 June 2021.
- Laker, John (April 2018). "Experimental Archaeology" (PDF). Archaeology in Marlow. 17 (2): 6. Archived from the original (PDF) on 6 June 2021.
- Raepsaet, Georges (1979). "Review: Bronze Boar Figurines in Iron Age and Roman Britain". L'Antiquité Classique. XLVIII (1): 435. JSTOR 41652617.
