= Æschere =

In the Old English epic Beowulf, Æschere is Hrothgar's most trusted advisor who is killed by Grendel's mother in her attack on Heorot after her son's death. His name, mentioned four times in the poem, is composed of the Old English words æsc, meaning 'ash' (and thus 'spear'), and here, meaning 'army'. King Hrothgar describes Æschere as 'min runwita ond min rædbora', which implies that he knows mysteries or enigmas and also has a duty to explain those mysteries aloud to a community. But by killing and decapitating Æschere, Grendel's mother highlights an anxiety within the poem about things that defy human interpretation. Beowulf and his Geatish warriors find Æschere's severed head at the entrance to Grendel's mother's lair.

== Bibliography ==
- Klaeber, Frederick (1950). Beowulf and the Fight at Finnsburh (3 ed.). Lexington, MA: Heath.
- Paz, James (Fall 2013). "Æschere's Head, Grendel's Mother, and the Sword That Isn't a Sword: Unreadable Things in Beowulf". Exemplaria. 25 (3). Taylor & Francis: 231–251. doi:10.1179/1041257313Z.00000000033. S2CID 191618476.
