= Hans-Jürgen Häßler =

- Born: Hans-Jürgen Häßler; 18 August 1939; Leipzig, Nazi Germany
- Died: 17 October 2011 (aged 72); Hannover, Germany
- Education: University of Hamburg
- Occupations: Prehistorian, museum curator

Hans-Jürgen Häßler (18 August 1939 – 17 October 2011) was a German prehistorian who in 1998 founded the Stiftung Deutsches Holocaust-Museum. He published a number of scholarly articles, and edited the journal Studien zur Sachsenforschung.

== Early life and education ==
Hans-Jürgen Häßler was born in Leipzig, Germany, amid the tumult of World War II. In 1949, a few years after his father and brothers made the same move, he left with his mother to Northern Germany, where until he was 16 he lived with his family in a refugee camp in Hamburg-Billbrook. Häßler completed elementary school in Hamburg, and apprenticed as a plumber. In 1959 he went to sea for a year, and from 1960 to 1962 he journeyed across Europe on a bike.

Häßler continued his education through night school while working as a craftsperson, and in September 1968 graduated from high school. He then enrolled at the University of Hamburg, where he studied archaeology and prehistory under Helmut Ziegert (de). He worked concurrently as a research assistant, and he completed his Ph.D. in 1975; his dissertation was entitled "Zur inneren Gliederung und Verbreitung der vorrömischen Eisenzeit im Niederelbegebiet" (On the structure and dissemination of the pre-Roman Iron Age in the Lower Elbe region).

== Career ==
On 15 April 1975 Häßler took up the position of curator in the then Department of Prehistory in the Lower Saxony State Museum, succeeding Albert Genrich (de). Häßler was particularly interested in the pre-Roman Iron Age and in the history and ethnogenesis of the Saxons, founding and editing the journal Studien zur Sachsenforschung and excavating and researching graves from Lower Saxony. These studies followed on the heels of work done by Genrich, who was also a co-founder, and later head, of the Internationales Sachsensymposion, considered the authoritative forum for the discussion of the archaeology of northwestern Europe from the first millennium AD. From 1996 to 2002 Häßler served as the chairman of the organisation. A pacifist, and influenced by his childhood experiences, in 1984 Häßler founded the Kulturwissenschaftler für Frieden und Abrüstung in Ost und West, and in 1998 he founded the Stiftung Deutsches Holocaust-Museum (de).

In 2007 Häßler was awarded for his work with the Medal of Merit of the Order of Merit of the Federal Republic of Germany.

== Personal life ==
Häßler had four children. He died on 17 October 2011.

== Publications ==
- Häßler, Hans-Jürgen, ed. (1987). Studien zur Sachsenforschung. Vol. 6. Hildesheim: Lax. ISBN 3-7848-1617-7.

== Bibliography ==
- Ludowici, Babette (2012). "Hans-Jürgen Häßler (1939–2011)". Archäologisches Nachrichtenblatt (in German). 17 (1). Akademie Verlag: 90–92. ISSN 0948-8359.
- Mittelstaedt, Werner (July 2001). "Deutsches Holocaust-Museum: Blickpunkt-Zukunft-Gespräch mit Dr. Hans-Jürgen Häßler" (PDF). Blickpunkt Zukunft. Zeitschrift mit Beiträgen und Zeitdokumenten zur Friedens- und Zukunftsdiskussion (in German). 21 (37): 1–9.
