= Hellvi helmet eyebrow =

Iron Age helmet eyebrow fragment

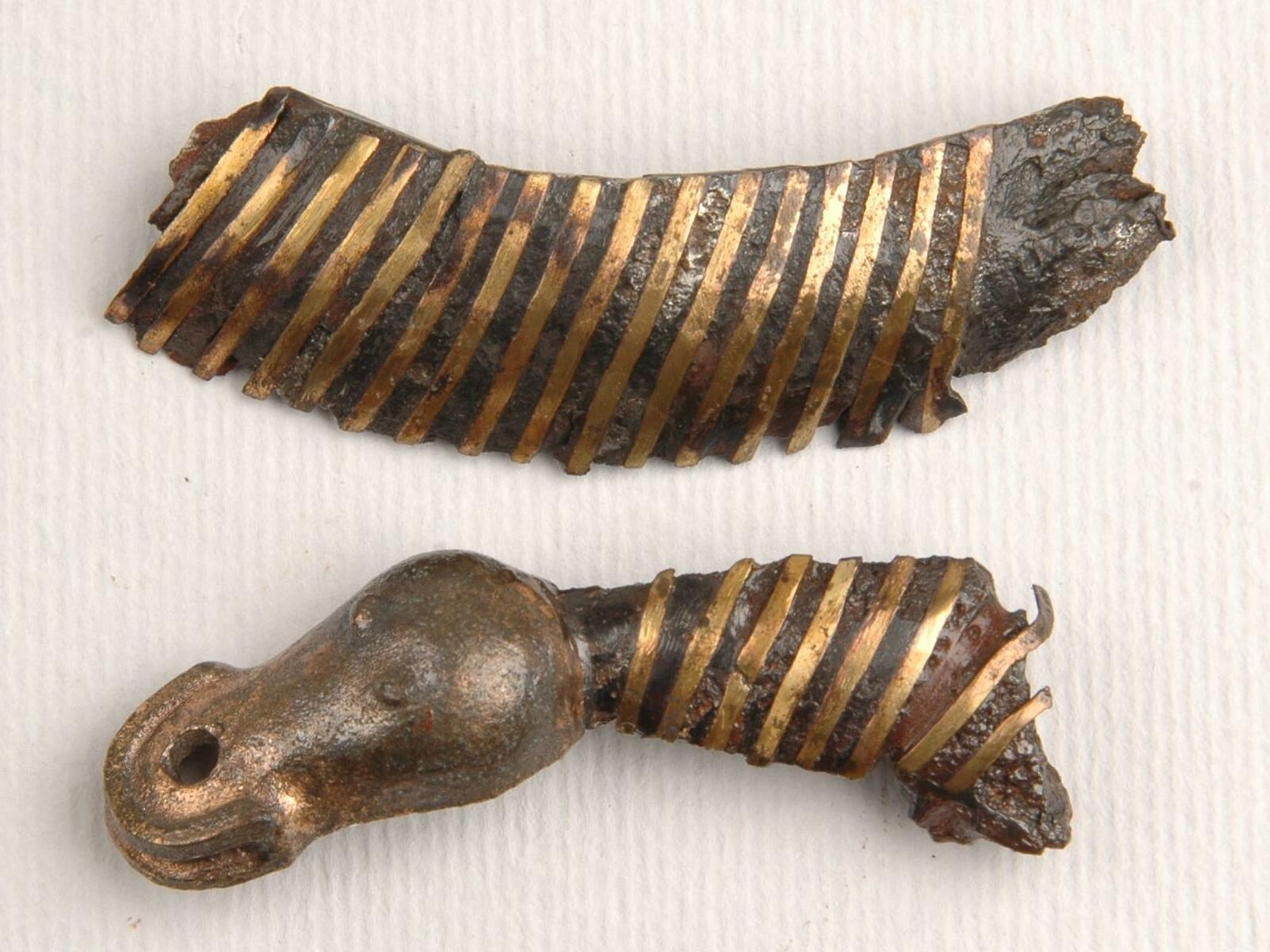
- Material: Iron, bronze, silver
- Created: c. 550–600
- Discovered: c. 1880; Hellvi, Gotland, Sweden
- Present location: Statens historiska museum, Stockholm
- Registration: 470807_HST

The Hellvi helmet eyebrow is a decorative eyebrow from a Vendel Period helmet. It comprises two fragments; the arch is made of iron decorated with strips of silver, and terminates in a bronze animal head that was cast on. The eyebrow was donated to the Statens historiska museum in November 1880 along with several other objects, all said to be from a grave find in Gotland, Sweden.

The eyebrow dates to around 550 to 600 AD, and would have once adorned one of the "crested helmets" that appeared in England and Scandinavia around that time. Many of these also featured decorated eyebrows, such as the Sutton Hoo helmet and the Broe helmet; the Hellvi example is one of a number of decorated eyebrows that have been found without other traces of the original helmet, including the Lokrume helmet fragment in Gotland and the Gevninge helmet fragment in Denmark.

== Description ==
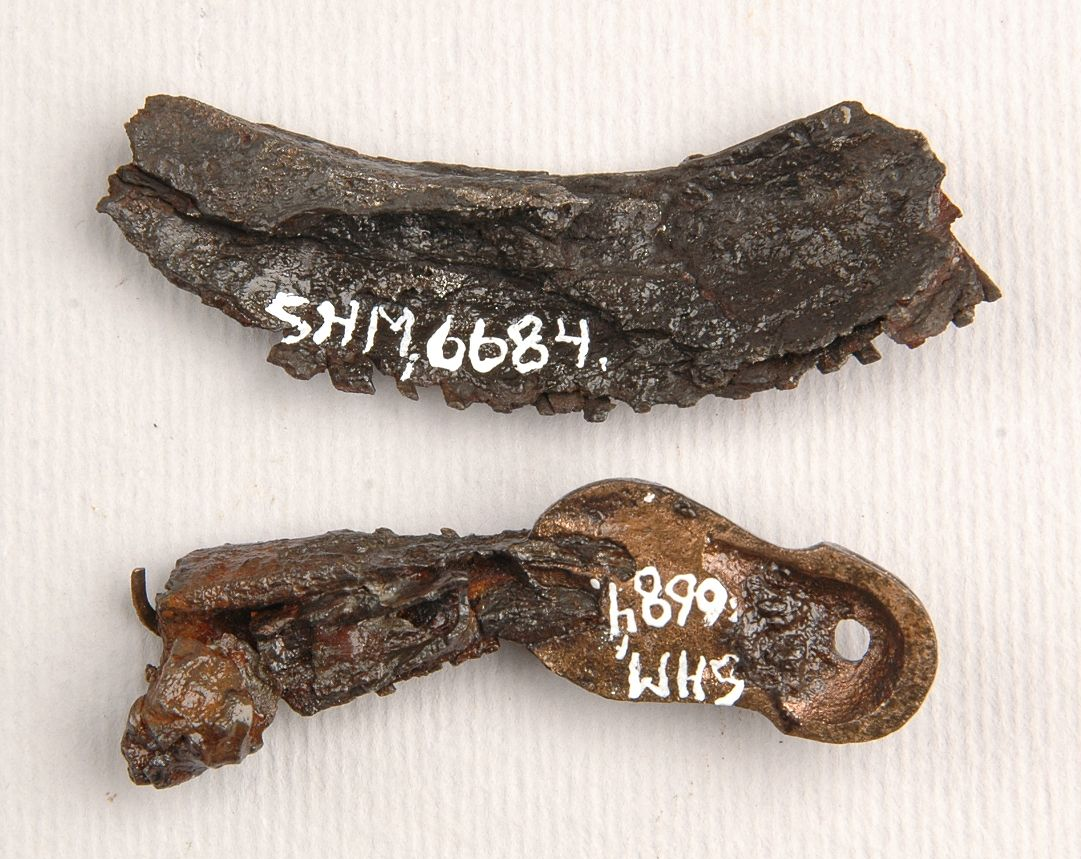
The back of the eyebrow

The eyebrow survives in two fragments, each about 4 cm (1.6 in) long, that originally formed a continuous arch. They are made of iron; the smaller of the fragments terminates in an animal head, made of bronze. The bronze and iron pieces were cast together, the hardened iron placed into the mould of the molten bronze. Both fragments are inlaid, or possibly cast, with vertical strips of silver.

== Discovery ==
The circumstances of the discovery of the eyebrow are largely unknown. It was donated along with other items, all said to be from a grave find in Hellvi socken in Gotland, to the Statens historiska museum in November 1880, and assigned the collective inventory number 6,684. The donation, from "the watchmaker Unnerus," was recorded the following year in Månadsblad, a monthly publication of the Royal Swedish Academy of Letters, History and Antiquities.

In 1969 Birger Nerman published an illustration of the reconstructed fragments in his volume II of his work on the Vendel Period finds from Gotland, Die Vendelzeit Gotlands; six years later, in volume I, he added a textual description. At some point before 1977, the eyebrow was further conserved at Greta Arwidsson's request, permitting more of its construction details to be perceived.

== Typology ==
The eyebrow has been roughly dated to the beginning of the Vendel Period, during the second half of the sixth century. Based on this period, and location, it fits into the corpus of "crested helmets", each characterized by a rounded cap and usually a prominent nose-to-nape crest, that appeared around this time in England and Scandinavia. More than half of the known examples are from Sweden; up to twenty are from Gotland alone, although these were typically found in cremation burials and, like the Hellvi example, comprise only a fragment or two.

The Hellvi example is one of many crested helmets to have featured decorated eyebrows. The Broe helmet—also from Gotland—and the Sutton Hoo helmet both have eyebrows with animal-head terminals, and inlaid strips of metal. The decorative motif of incised vertical strips has been repeated on other helmets, such as from Vendel and York, in what is probably a cheaper imitation, or an invocation of an earlier style. Other decorated helmet eyebrows have also been discovered alone. These include another decorated eyebrow from Gotland, in Lokrume, an eyebrow from Uppåkra on the mainland, and an ornate helmet eyepiece from Gevninge, Denmark. The singularity of at least the latter two finds has led to an association with the Germanic god Odin, who reputedly gave one of his eyes to drink from the well of wisdom. Another artefact found in Hellvi—a Roman mask that saw continued use in the Iron Age, and was found in a house dating to around 550—had one eye removed and buried nearby, further suggesting the contemporaneous significance of singular eyes.

== See also ==
- Hellvi bronze mask

== Bibliography ==
- Arwidsson, Greta (1977). Valsgärde 7. Die Gräberfunde von Valsgärde (in German). Vol. III. Uppsala: Uppsala universitets museum för nordiska fornsaker. ISBN 91-506-0113-X.
- Bruce-Mitford, Rupert (1952). "The Sutton Hoo Ship-Burial". In Hodgkin, Robert Howard (ed.). A History of the Anglo-Saxons. Vol. II (3rd ed.). London: Oxford University Press. pp. 696–734, 750–756.
- Bruce-Mitford, Rupert (1974). Aspects of Anglo-Saxon Archaeology: Sutton Hoo and Other Discoveries. London: Victor Gollancz Limited. ISBN 0-575-01704-X.
- Bruce-Mitford, Rupert (1978). The Sutton Hoo Ship-Burial, Volume 2: Arms, Armour and Regalia. London: British Museum Publications. ISBN 978-0-7141-1331-9.
- Christensen, Tom (2002). "Kongens Mand – Guld og Hjelm fra Gevninge". In Pind, John; Jørgensen, Anne Nørgård; Jørgensen, Lars; Storgård, Birger; Rindel, Per Ole & Ilkjær, Jørgen (eds.). Drik – og du vil Leve Skønt: Festskrift til Ulla Lund Hansen på 60-årsdagen 18. august 2002. Studies in Archaeology & History (in Danish). Vol. 7. Copenhagen: National Museum of Denmark. pp. 41–45. ISBN 978-87-89384-90-0.
- "Från Akademiens sammankomster: Den 2 november 1880". Månadsblad (in Swedish). 9 (105–108). Royal Swedish Academy of Letters, History and Antiquities: 181–182. September–December 1881.
- "Hjälm". Sök i samlingarna. Statens historiska museum.
- Larsson, Lars (March 2007). "The Iron Age ritual building at Uppåkra, southern Sweden". Antiquity. 81 (311): 11–25. doi:10.1017/S0003598X00094813.
- Lindqvist, Sune (1925). "Vendelhjälmarnas ursprung" (PDF). Fornvännen (in Swedish). 20: 181–207. ISSN 0015-7813. Archived from the original (PDF) on 22 March 2017.
- Nerman, Birger (1969a). Die Vendelzeit Gotlands (II): Tafeln. Monographien Herausgegehen von der Kungliga Vitterhets Historie och Antikvitets Akademien (in German). Vol. 48. Stockholm: Almqvist & Wiksell.
- Nerman, Birger (1969b). Die Vendelzeit Gotlands: Provisorisches Verzeichnis der Tafelfiguren (in German). Stockholm: Almqvist & Wiksell.
- Nerman, Birger (1975). Die Vendelzeit Gotlands (I:1): Text. Monographien Herausgegehen von der Kungliga Vitterhets Historie och Antikvitets Akademien (in German). Vol. 55. Stockholm: Almqvist & Wiksell. ISBN 91-7402-016-1.
- Price, Neil & Mortimer, Paul (2014). "An Eye for Odin? Divine Role-Playing in the Age of Sutton Hoo". European Journal of Archaeology. 17 (3): 517–538. doi:10.1179/1461957113Y.0000000050.
- Steuer, Heiko (1987). "Helm und Ringschwert: Prunkbewaffnung und Rangabzeichen germanischer Krieger" [Helmet and Ring-Sword: Ornamental Weapons and Insignia of Germanic Warriors]. In Häßler, Hans-Jürgen (ed.). Studien zur Sachsenforschung [Studies in Saxon Research] (in German). Vol. 6. Hildesheim: Lax. pp. 189–236. ISBN 3-7848-1617-7.
- Tweddle, Dominic (1992). The Anglian Helmet from 16–22 Coppergate. The Archaeology of York. Vol. 17/8. London: Council for British Archaeology. ISBN 1-872414-19-2. Archived from the original on 21 March 2024.
- Webster, Leslie (1998). "Archaeology and Beowulf". In Mitchell, Bruce & Robinson, Fred C. (eds.). Beowulf: An Edition with Relevant Shorter Texts. Oxford: Blackwell. pp. 183–194. ISBN 0-631-17225-4.
  - Republished as Webster, Leslie (2002). "Archaeology and Beowulf". In Donoghue, Daniel (ed.). Beowulf: A Verse Translation: Authoritative Texts, Contexts, Criticism. Translated by Heaney, Seamus. New York: W. W. Norton. pp. 212–223. ISBN 0-393-97580-0.
