= 2025 Lejre municipal election =

Municipal election in Denmark

| ← 2021 | 18 November 2025 | 2029 → |

All 25 seats to the Lejre municipal council 13 seats needed for a majority
- Turnout: 17,416 (75.0%) ▲0.9%
| | First party | Second party | Third party |
|---|---|---|---|
| | V | F | A |
| Party | Venstre | Green Left | Social Democrats |
| Last election | 8 seats, 28.2% | 4 seats, 15.2% | 6 seats, 21.6% |
| Seats won | 7 | 5 | 3 |
| Seat change | ▼1 | ▲1 | ▼3 |
| Popular vote | 4,666 | 3,434 | 1,933 |
| Percentage | 27.2% | 20.0% | 11.3% |
| Swing | ▼0.9% | ▲4.9% | ▼10.3% |
| | Fourth party | Fifth party | Sixth party |
| | Ø | C | O |
| Party | Red-Green Alliance | Conservatives | Danish People's Party |
| Last election | 1 seat, 6.9% | 4 seats, 13.6% | 1 seat, 3.5% |
| Seats won | 2 | 2 | 2 |
| Seat change | ▲1 | ▼2 | ▲1 |
| Popular vote | 1,278 | 1,185 | 935 |
| Percentage | 7.5% | 6.9% | 5.5% |
| Swing | ▲0.5% | ▼6.7% | ▲2.0% |
| | Seventh party | Eighth party | Ninth party |
| | I | Æ | B |
| Party | Liberal Alliance | Denmark Democrats | Social Liberals |
| Last election | 0 seats, 1.6% | Did not stand | 1 seat, 3.9% |
| Seats won | 1 | 1 | 1 |
| Seat change | ▲1 | ▲1 | 0 |
| Popular vote | 911 | 750 | 652 |
| Percentage | 5.3% | 4.4% | 3.8% |
| Swing | ▲3.7% | New | ▼0.1% |
Mayor before election
Tina Mandrup
Venstre
Mayor after election
Mikael Ralf Baade Larsen
Green Left

The 2025 Lejre Municipal election was held on November 18, 2025, to elect the 25 members to sit in the regional council for the Lejre Municipal council, in the Danish town of Lejre, for the period 2026 to 2029. Pernille Beckmann from Venstre, would secure re-election. Mikael Ralf Baade Larsen from the Green Left, would win the mayoral position.

== Background ==
Following the 2021 election, Tina Mandrup from Venstre became mayor for her first term. She is set to run for a second term.

== Electoral system ==
For elections to Danish municipalities, a number varying from 9 to 31 are chosen to be elected to the municipal council. The seats are then allocated using the D'Hondt method and a closed list proportional representation. Lejre Municipality had 25 seats in 2025.

== Electoral alliances ==
=== Electoral Alliance 1 ===
| Party | | Political alignment |
|---|---|---|
| A | Social Democrats | Centre-left |
| F | Green Left | Centre-left to Left-wing |
| Ø | Red-Green Alliance | Left-wing to Far-Left |
| Å | The Alternative | Centre-left to Left-wing |

=== Electoral Alliance 2 ===
| Party | | Political alignment |
|---|---|---|
| B | Social Liberals | Centre to Centre-left |
| V | Venstre | Centre-right |

=== Electoral Alliance 3 ===
| Party | | Political alignment |
|---|---|---|
| C | Conservatives | Centre-right |
| I | Liberal Alliance | Centre-right to Right-wing |
| M | Moderates | Centre to Centre-right |
| O | Danish People's Party | Right-wing to Far-right |
| Æ | Denmark Democrats | Right-wing to Far-right |

== Results by polling station ==
| Division | A | B | C | F | I | L | M | N | O | V | Æ | Ø | Å |
| Division | % | % | % | % | % | % | % | % | % | % | % | % | % |
|---|---|---|---|---|---|---|---|---|---|---|---|---|---|
| Hyllinge-Lyndby | 11.5 | 2.3 | 5.7 | 14.5 | 6.2 | 3.6 | 0.3 | 0.6 | 9.1 | 33.7 | 6.0 | 5.1 | 1.5 |
| Rye | 17.6 | 4.0 | 5.7 | 21.4 | 5.7 | 3.1 | 0.5 | 0.3 | 7.2 | 23.9 | 4.1 | 4.2 | 2.4 |
| Sæby-Gershøj | 9.1 | 2.5 | 5.4 | 19.1 | 5.5 | 2.9 | 0.7 | 1.6 | 5.8 | 36.5 | 4.8 | 4.4 | 1.9 |
| Sonnerup | 13.6 | 3.3 | 7.3 | 16.8 | 8.4 | 5.0 | 0.9 | 0.7 | 7.6 | 23.4 | 8.1 | 3.5 | 1.6 |
| Glim | 8.3 | 3.4 | 4.8 | 14.3 | 5.9 | 1.6 | 0.7 | 5.7 | 5.4 | 38.0 | 5.6 | 6.1 | 0.1 |
| Hvalsø | 14.6 | 4.5 | 7.9 | 23.1 | 4.4 | 2.8 | 0.6 | 1.5 | 3.5 | 19.8 | 2.9 | 12.2 | 2.4 |
| Kr.Såby | 11.7 | 1.7 | 10.4 | 18.2 | 4.0 | 12.0 | 0.5 | 0.3 | 6.0 | 21.8 | 7.9 | 5.1 | 0.5 |
| Gevninge | 9.0 | 4.0 | 6.3 | 18.3 | 4.1 | 2.5 | 0.7 | 1.1 | 4.8 | 37.7 | 3.6 | 7.2 | 0.7 |
| Lejre (Kulturhuset Domus Felix) | 5.0 | 4.6 | 6.9 | 30.7 | 5.9 | 2.1 | 0.1 | 9.2 | 1.7 | 21.2 | 0.8 | 10.8 | 1.0 |
| Osted | 10.8 | 6.5 | 6.8 | 15.2 | 5.6 | 2.9 | 1.5 | 2.1 | 6.3 | 28.6 | 5.0 | 6.9 | 1.9 |

== Results ==
| Party | | Votes | % | +/- | Seats | +/- |
Lejre Municipality
| V | Venstre | 4,666 | 27.22 | -0.95 | 7 | -1 |
| F | Green Left | 3,434 | 20.03 | +4.87 | 5 | +1 |
| A | Social Democrats | 1,933 | 11.28 | -10.28 | 3 | -3 |
| Ø | Red-Green Alliance | 1,278 | 7.45 | +0.52 | 2 | +1 |
| C | Conservatives | 1,185 | 6.91 | -6.69 | 2 | -2 |
| O | Danish People's Party | 935 | 5.45 | +1.96 | 2 | +1 |
| I | Liberal Alliance | 911 | 5.31 | +3.73 | 1 | +1 |
| Æ | Denmark Democrats | 750 | 4.37 | New | 1 | New |
| B | Social Liberals | 652 | 3.80 | -0.08 | 1 | 0 |
| L | Lokallisten Levende Landsbyer Lejre | 645 | 3.76 | New | 1 | New |
| N | Nærdemokratiet | 395 | 2.30 | New | 0 | New |
| Å | The Alternative | 259 | 1.51 | New | 0 | New |
| M | Moderates | 101 | 0.59 | New | 0 | New |
| Total | | 17,144 | 100 | N/A | 25 | N/A |
| Invalid votes | | 39 | 0.17 | -0.02 | | |
| Blank votes | | 233 | 1.00 | +0.19 | | |
| Turnout | | 17,416 | 75.05 | +0.92 | | |
Source: valg.dk

== Opinion polls ==
| Polling firm | Fieldwork date | Sample size | V | A | F | C | Ø | B | O | L | I | M | N | Å | Æ | Others | Lead |
|---|---|---|---|---|---|---|---|---|---|---|---|---|---|---|---|---|---|
| Epinion | 4 Sep - 13 Oct 2025 | 578 | 20.9 | 20.1 | 19.0 | 5.0 | 7.3 | 3.4 | 8.6 | – | 5.7 | 1.9 | – | 1.1 | 5.1 | 1.4 | 0.8 |
| 2024 european parliament election | 9 Jun 2024 | | 14.3 | 13.9 | 21.6 | 7.7 | 6.6 | 6.8 | 7.3 | – | 6.5 | 7.3 | – | 1.8 | 6.1 | – | 7.3 |
| 2022 general election | 1 Nov 2022 | | 13.1 | 24.1 | 13.4 | 4.3 | 4.4 | 3.6 | 3.4 | – | 7.1 | 11.6 | – | 3.2 | 7.2 | – | 10.7 |
| 2021 regional election | 16 Nov 2021 | | 25.4 | 23.7 | 12.4 | 13.2 | 8.0 | 4.9 | 4.6 | – | 2.0 | – | – | 0.4 | – | – | 1.7 |
| 2021 municipal election | 16 Nov 2021 | | 28.2 (8) | 21.6 (6) | 15.2 (4) | 13.6 (4) | 6.9 (1) | 3.9 (1) | 3.5 (1) | 2.4 (0) | 1.6 (0) | – | – | – | – | – | 6.6 |
