= Gevninge helmet fragment =

6th or 7th century artefact

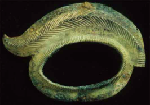
- Gevninge helmet fragment
- Material: Bronze, gold
- Size: 8 by 5 cm (3 by 2 in)
- Created: c. 550–700 AD
- Discovered: 2000; Gevninge, Denmark; 55.6451°N 11.9595°E
- Present location: Lejre Museum, Denmark

The Gevninge helmet fragment is the dexter eyepiece of a helmet from the Viking Age or end of the Nordic Iron Age. It was found in 2000 during the excavation of a Viking farmstead in Gevninge, near Lejre, Denmark. The fragment is moulded from bronze and gilded, and consists of a stylised eyebrow with eyelashes above an oval opening. There are three holes at the top and bottom of the fragment to affix the eyepiece to a helmet. The fragment is significant as rare evidence of contemporaneous helmets, and also for its discovery in Gevninge, an outpost that is possibly connected to the Anglo-Saxon epic Beowulf. It has been in the collection of the Lejre Museum since its discovery, and has been exhibited internationally as part of a travelling exhibition on Vikings.

The fragment is an ornate piece, but nothing else remains of the helmet; it might be the single remnant of a disintegrated helmet, or it might have been lost or discarded. It is one of two Scandinavian eyepieces discovered alone, giving rise to the suggestion that it was intentionally deposited in an invocation of the one-eyed god Odin. It would have been part of a decorated "crested helmet", the type of headgear that was common to England and Scandinavia from the sixth through eleventh centuries AD. These are particularly known from the examples found at Vendel, Valsgärde, and Sutton Hoo; the Tjele helmet fragment is the only other Danish example known.

Gevninge is three kilometres (1.9 mi) upriver from Lejre, a one-time centre of power believed to be the setting for Heorot, the fabled mead hall to which the poetical hero Beowulf journeys in search of the eoten Grendel. The settlement's location suggests that it functioned as an outpost through which anyone would have to pass when sailing to the capital, and in which trusted and loyal guardians would serve. This mirrors Beowulf's experience on his way to Heorot, for upon disembarking he is met with a mounted lookout whose job it is "to watch the waves for raiders, and danger to the Danish shore." Upon answering his challenge, Beowulf is escorted down the road to Heorot, much as an Iron Age visitor to Lejre might have been led along the road from Gevninge. The Gevninge helmet fragment, a military piece from a riverside outpost, therefore sheds light on the relationship between historical fact and legend.

== Description ==
The Gevninge eyepiece is 8 cm (3 in) wide and 5 cm (2 in) tall, moulded from bronze and gilded. An oval eye opening is overlain by a sculpted eyebrow with grooves representing individual hairs; grooves around the perimeter of the oval might represent eyelashes. The top and bottom of the fragment each have three holes, presumably used to attach it to the helmet where it would have formed the dexter eyepiece. The top three holes might have attached it to the helmet cap, the bottom three to some form of face protection such as a face mask or camail.

=== Typology ===
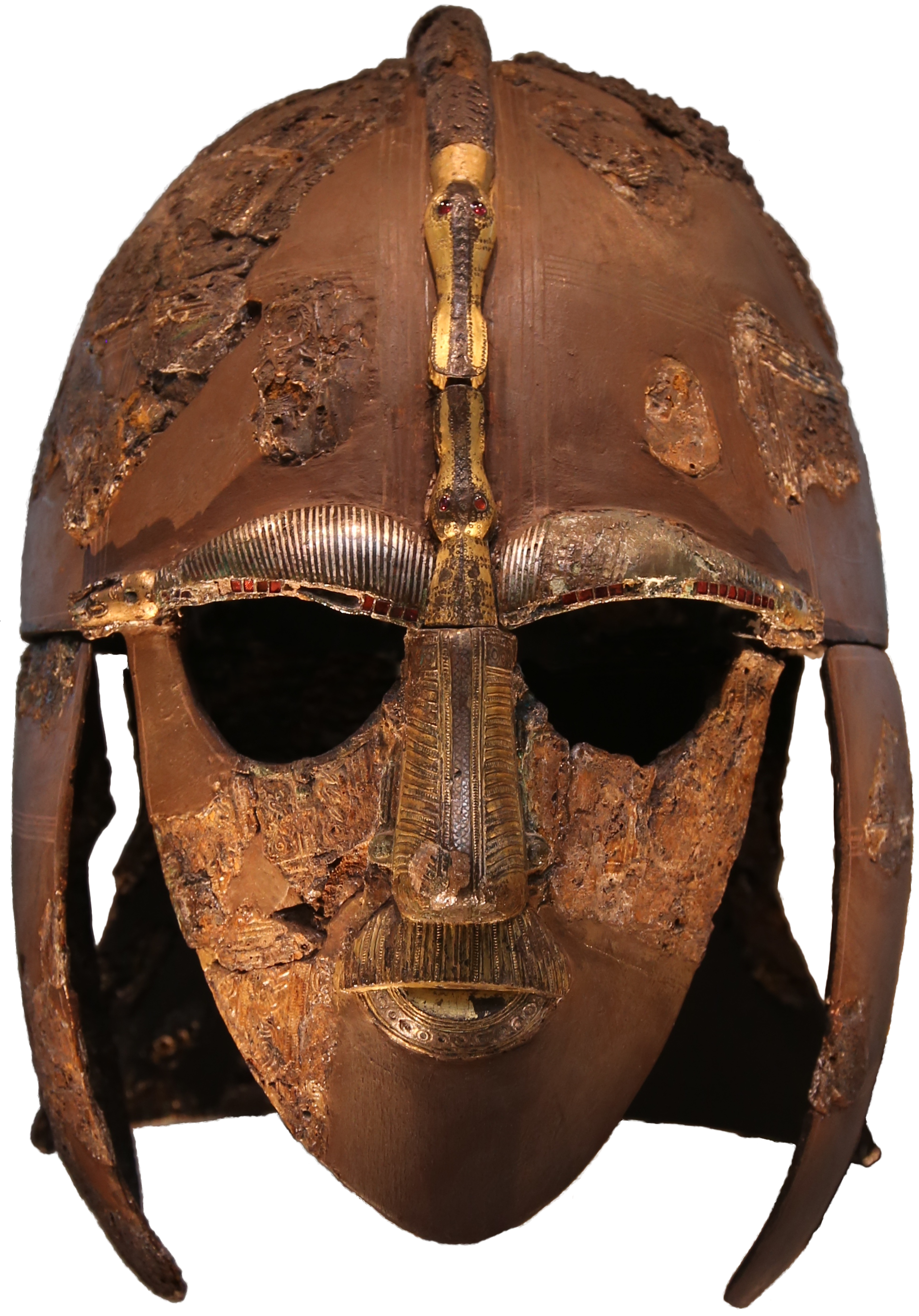
The decorated Anglo-Saxon Sutton Hoo helmet

The Gevninge helmet fragment was discovered by itself, with no other nearby artefacts to give it context. The settlement at Gevninge dates to between 500 and 1000, while helmets with similar decorative characteristics suggest dating the eyepiece to the sixth or seventh century, perhaps from 550 to 700; another helmet eyebrow discovered in Uppåkra, Sweden, has the same suggested date. The Gevninge fragment fits into the corpus of Anglo-Saxon and Scandinavian "crested helmets", each characterized by a rounded cap and usually a prominent nose-to-nape crest. The Tjele helmet fragment is the only such helmet found in Denmark, while the richly ornamented helmets found at Sutton Hoo, Vendel, and Valsgärde may provide the closest approximation to what the Gevninge helmet would have looked like when whole.

=== Function ===
Helmets like that which the Gevninge fragment once adorned served both as utilitarian equipment and as displays of status. Examples from Northern Europe during the Nordic Iron Age and Viking Age are rare. This may partly suggest a failure to survive a millennium underground or perhaps a failure to be recognised after excavation: the plainer Anglo-Saxon and Roman helmets from Shorwell and Burgh Castle were initially misidentified as pots. The extreme scarcity nevertheless suggests that they were never deposited in great numbers, and that they signified the importance of those wearing them. In the Anglo-Saxon poem Beowulf, a story about kings and nobles that partly takes place in Denmark, helmets are mentioned often, and in ways that indicate their significance. The dying words of Beowulf, whose own pyre is stacked with helmets, are used to bestow a gold collar, byrnie, and gilded helmet to his follower Wiglaf.

If protection was all that was asked of a helmet, a simple iron cap would suffice. Yet a soldier guarding Gevninge, a riverside outpost on the way to the major city of Lejre, would have to be trustworthy, and perhaps also connected to the king by family or loyalty. He would also occupy an important position in the military hierarchy. Adornments like the Gevninge fragment would have identified the rank of such a person, as well as adding decoration to a helmet.

== Discovery ==
The fragment was discovered in 2000 with the use of a metal detector during a minor excavation in Gevninge, a Viking Age settlement and modern-day village in Denmark to the west of Roskilde. The excavation was in response to the planned construction of houses on an undeveloped hectare of land in the middle of the village, but it unexpectedly revealed a farmstead with several buildings.

The eyepiece may have been made at nearby Lejre, the seat of the Scylding kings during the Iron and Viking ages. It was discovered in the topsoil and might have been lost or discarded, or the entire helmet might have become buried and then been destroyed by ploughing. It might also have been deliberately buried, as was the helmet eyebrow from Uppåkra. If buried alone, it might have been an allusion to the one-eyed god Odin who sacrificed an eye in exchange for wisdom and intelligence in Norse mythology.

=== Exhibition ===
The Lejre Museum now displays the Gevninge fragment alongside other seventh-century grave finds from the area. The fragment was exhibited in Denmark and internationally from 2013 to 2015 as part of a major exhibition on the Vikings, starting at the National Museum of Denmark. It then travelled to the British Museum for Vikings: Life and Legend, then to Berlin's Martin-Gropius-Bau for Die Wikinger.

== Context and Beowulf ==
The discovery of the fragment in Gevninge is notable for its proximity to Lejre, three kilometres (1.9 mi) down the river from Roskilde Fjord. Lejre was once a centre of power, as evidenced by monumental burial mounds, large halls, the silver-filled Lejre Hoard, and stone ships. For the last hundred years Lejre has also been understood as the most likely setting for Heorot, the great mead hall of the Danes in the Anglo-Saxon epic poem Beowulf, to which Beowulf travels in search of Grendel and Grendel's mother. In this sense, Gevninge could have been "the Port of Lejre", standing guard against anyone who sailed towards the capital. Indeed, Beowulf and his men are met by such a guard when they disembark in Denmark:

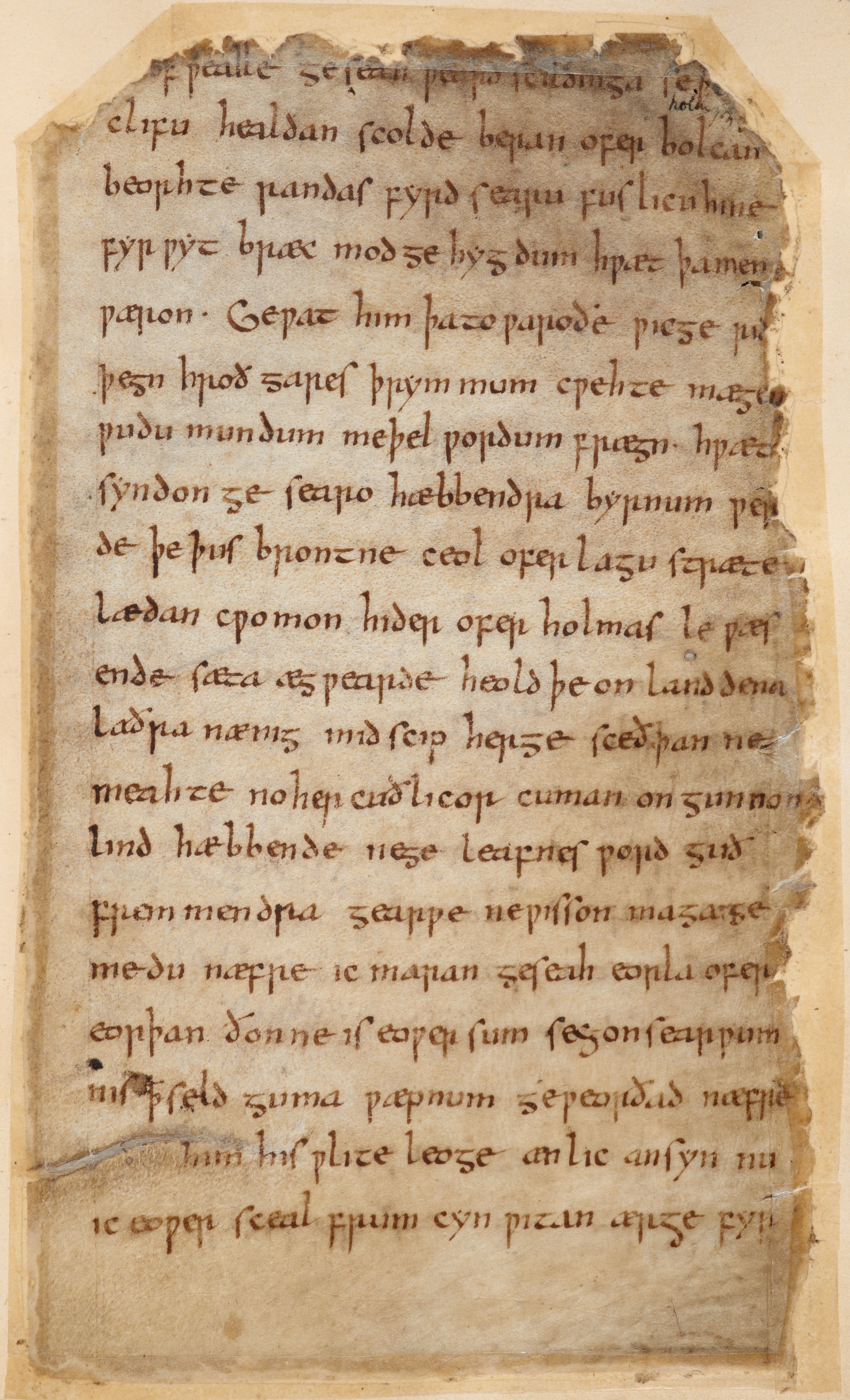
Folio 137r of the Beowulf manuscript, showing lines 229–252 (Note: The folio starts at the beginning of line 229 (the word þa has been lost to fragmentation), and ends a word short of the end of line 252, with the word fyr. An 1884 renumbering of the folios by the British Library means that there are two numbering paradigms, the "manuscript foliation" and the "British Library foliation". The page shown is folio 137r under the British Library foliation, and folio 135r under the manuscript foliation.)

þa of wealle geseah weard Scildinga,
se þe holmclifu healdan scolde,
beran ofer bolcan beorhte randas,
fyrdsearu fuslicu; hine fyrwyt bræc
modgehygdum, hwæt þa men wæron.
Gewat him þa to waroðe wicge ridan
þegn Hroðgares, þrymmum cwehte
mægenwudu mundum, meþelwordum frægn:

"Hwæt syndon ge searohæbbendra,
byrnum werede, þe þus brontne ceol
ofer lagustræte lædan cwomon,
hider ofer holmas? le wæs
endesæta, ægwearde heold,
þe on land Dena laðra nænig
mid scipherge sceðþan ne meahte.
No her cuðlicor cuman ongunnon
lindhæbbende; ne ge leafnesword
guðfremmendra gearwe ne wisson,
maga gemedu. Næfre ic maran geseah
eorla ofer eorþan ðonne is eower sum,
secg on searwum; nis þæt seldguma,
wæpnum geweorðad, næfne him his wlite leoge,
ænlic ansyn. Nu ic eower sceal
frumcyn witan, ær ge fyr heonan,
leassceaweras, on land Dena
furþur feran. Nu ge feorbuend,
mereliðende, minne gehyrað
anfealdne geþoht: Ofost is selest
to gecyðanne hwanan eowre cyme syndon."

—Old English text
Translation:

When the watchman on the wall, the Shieldings' lookout
whose job it was to guard the sea-cliffs,
saw shields glittering on the gangplank
and battle-equipment being unloaded
he had to find out who and what
the arrivals were. So he rode to the shore,
this horseman of Hrothgar’s, and challenged them
in formal terms, flourishing his spear:

"What kind of men are you who arrive
rigged out for combat in coats of mail,
sailing here over the sea-lanes
in your steep-hulled boat? I have been stationed
as lookout on this coast for a long time.
My job is to watch the waves for raiders,
and danger to the Danish shore.
Never before has a force under arms
disembarked so openly—not bothering to ask
if the sentries allowed them safe passage
or the clan had consented. Nor have I seen
a mightier man-at-arms on this earth
than the one standing here: unless I am mistaken,
he is truly noble. This is no mere
hanger-on in a hero’s armour.
So now, before you fare inland
as interlopers, I have to be informed
about who you are and where you hail from.
Outsiders from across the water,
I say it again: the sooner you tell
where you come from and why, the better."

—English translation

The watchman is a "noble warrior" (guð-beorna) who, after listening to Beowulf's explanation of his voyage, directs his men to watch the hero's boat and offers to escort him to king Hrothgar. He then turns back stating, "I'm away to the sea, back on alert against enemy raiders" (Ic to sæ wille, wið wrað werod wearde healdan). Whether or not Gevninge was the basis for the coastal outpost encountered in Beowulf, the two filled similar roles. They would have also been subject to similar strategic considerations, being both early lines of defence against attack, and places to welcome the flow of visitors. In this way, the fragment provides a nexus between legend and historical fact.

== Bibliography ==
- Bennhold, Katrin (29 March 2014). "Vikings in London: Just Like Family". Arts. The New York Times. No. 56381. New York. p. C1.
- Beowulf. n.d.

- Old English quotations above use the Klaeber text, published as Klaeber, Friedrich (1922). Beowulf and The Fight at Finnsburg. Boston: D.C. Heath & Company.

- Christensen, Tom (2000). Et Hjelmfragment fra Gevninge. ROMU: Årsskrift Fra Roskilde Museum (in Danish). Vol. 19. pp. 31–38. ISBN 978-87-88563-50-4. ISSN 0107-928X.
- Christensen, Tom (2002). "Kongens Mand – Guld og Hjelm fra Gevninge". In Pind, John; Jørgensen, Anne Nørgård; Jørgensen, Lars; Storgård, Birger; Rindel, Per Ole & Ilkjær, Jørgen (eds.). Drik – og du vil Leve Skønt: Festskrift til Ulla Lund Hansen på 60-årsdagen 18. august 2002. Studies in Archaeology & History (in Danish). Vol. 7. Copenhagen: National Museum of Denmark. pp. 41–45. ISBN 978-87-89384-90-0.
- Christensen, Tom (2015). Lejre Bag Myten: De Arkæologiske Udgravninger (in Danish). Højbjerg: Jysk Arkæologisk Selskab. ISBN 978-87-88415-96-4.
- "Die Wikinger". Museum für Vor- und Frühgeschichte. Staatliche Museen zu Berlin. Archived from the original on 11 August 2017.
- Heaney, Seamus (2000). Beowulf: A New Verse Translation. New York: W. W. Norton. ISBN 978-0-393-32097-8.
- Helgesson, Bertil (2004). "Tributes to be Spoken of Sacrifice and Warriors at Uppåkra" (PDF). In Larsson, Lars (ed.). Continuity for Centuries: A Ceremonial Building and its Context at Uppåkra, Southern Sweden. Acta Archaeologica Lundensia. Vol. 48. Stockholm: Almqvist & Wiksell International. pp. 223–239. ISBN 978-91-22-02107-0.
- Hood, Jamie; Ager, Barry; Williams, Craig; Harrington, Susan & Cartwright, Caroline (2012). "Investigating and interpreting an Early-to-Mid Sixth-Century Frankish Style Helmet" (PDF). The British Museum Technical Research Bulletin. 6: 83–95. ISBN 978-1-904982-80-7.
- Johnson, Stephen (1980). "A Late Roman Helmet from Burgh Castle". Britannia. XI: 303–312. doi:10.2307/525684. JSTOR 525684.
- Kiernan, Kevin, ed. (2016). "Prefixed Leaves". Electronic Beowulf. University of Kentucky.
- "Lejre – Myth and Archaeology" (PDF). Medieval News. 5: 6–11. May 2016.
- Osborn, Marijane (2007). "The Lejre Connection in Beowulf Scholarship" (PDF). In Niles, John D. & Osborn, Marijane (eds.). Beowulf and Lejre. Medieval and Renaissance Texts and Studies. Vol. 323. Tempe: Arizona Center for Medieval and Renaissance Studies. pp. 287–293. ISBN 978-0-86698-368-6.
- Price, Neil & Mortimer, Paul (2014). "An Eye for Odin? Divine Role-Playing in the Age of Sutton Hoo". European Journal of Archaeology. 17 (3): 517–538. doi:10.1179/1461957113Y.0000000050. S2CID 161907810.
- Steuer, Heiko (1987). "Helm und Ringschwert: Prunkbewaffnung und Rangabzeichen germanischer Krieger" [Helmet and Ring-Sword: Ornamental Weapons and Insignia of Germanic Warriors]. In Häßler, Hans-Jürgen (ed.). Studien zur Sachsenforschung [Studies in Saxon Research] (in German). Vol. 6. Hildesheim: Lax. pp. 189–236. ISBN 3-7848-1617-7.
- Stjerna, Knut (1912). Essays on Questions Connected with the Old English Poem of Beowulf. Extra Series. Vol. III. Translated by Hall, John Richard Clark. London: Viking Club: Society for Northern Research.
- Tweddle, Dominic (1992). The Anglian Helmet from 16–22 Coppergate. The Archaeology of York. Vol. 17/8. London: Council for British Archaeology. ISBN 1-872414-19-2. Archived from the original on 21 March 2024.
- Ulriksen, Jens (2008). "Gevninge – Leddet til Lejre". KUML (in Danish). 57 (57): 145–180. doi:10.7146/kuml.v57i57.24659. Archived from the original on 2 October 2017.
- "Vikings: Life and Legend". The British Museum Past Exhibitions. The British Museum.
- Williams, Gareth; Pentz, Peter & Wemhoff, Matthias, eds. (2013). Viking. Copenhagen: Nationalmuseet. ISBN 978-87-7602-200-6.
- Williams, Gareth; Pentz, Peter & Wemhoff, Matthias, eds. (2014a). Vikings: Life and Legend. London: British Museum Press. ISBN 978-0-7141-2337-0.
- Williams, Gareth; Pentz, Peter & Wemhoff, Matthias, eds. (2014b). Die Wikinger (in German). München: Hirmer. ISBN 978-3-7774-2232-9.
