= Ramsåsa Church =

Church in Ramsåsa, Scania, Sweden

- Ramsåsa kyrka
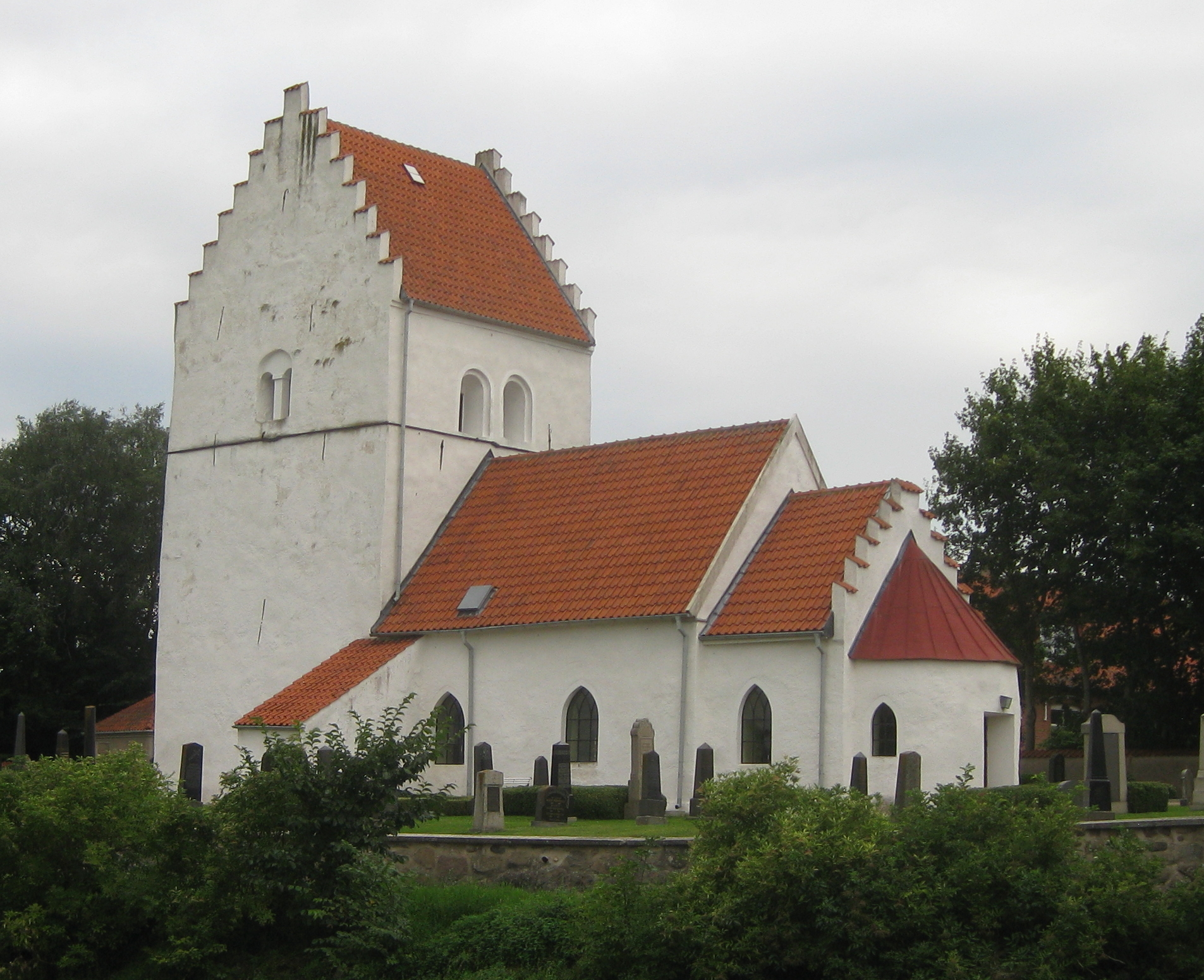
- Ramsåsa Church

- Location within Skåne Location within Sweden Location within Europe
- 55°33′33″N 13°53′03″E
- Country: Sweden
- Denomination: Church of Sweden

Ramsåsa Church ([ˈrɑːmsoːsa]; Swedish: Ramsåsa kyrka) is a medieval church in Ramsåsa, Scania, Sweden. It belongs to the Church of Sweden. It was built around 1200, and the tower added in the 15th century. The church contains medieval murals from three different periods, a late Romanesque rood cross and a medieval baptismal font.

== History ==
Ramsåsa Church was built around 1200 and originally consisted of a nave and a chancel with an apse. The disproportional tower was erected during the 15th century. During the same century, the interior of the church was remade and a vaulted ceiling built. Alterations were made to the tower in 1846, and the church renovated between 1852 and 1853, to designs by Carl Georg Brunius. In 1954 medieval murals were discovered and uncovered. A substantial renovation of the whole church was made 1958 to 1961. Work was carried out in 1986 to protect the murals in the apse from further deterioration.

== Murals and furnishings ==
The north wall of the nave contains murals from the 14th century, depicting Saint Christopher and the Wheel of Fortune, the latter an unusual subject among Nordic mural paintings from the Middle Ages. The apse is also decorated, with a Romanesque mural depicting Christ in Majesty, in an unusual, squarish mandorla. Furthermore, the ribs of the vaults of the chancel contain purely decorative paintings from the late Middle Ages.

The rood of the church is from the 13th century and in a late Romanesque style, depicting Christ as triumphant rather than suffering. It shows Christ with open eyes, with his head held upright and thin limbs. Originally the sculpture carried a crown, which was replaced in the 15th century with the current crown of thorns. The arms of the sculpture were probably also altered at that time. Sometime before 1907, the uppermost part of the cross was sawn off. The cross was discovered in the attic of the church at the beginning of the 20th century, and was kept in the Historical Museum at Lund University in Lund until 1954, when it was returned to the church. The baptismal font is late medieval and made of sandstone. The pulpit dates from the 17th century, but was heavily altered during the 18th century. The altarpiece is modern, installed in 1961.
