= Björka Church =

- Björka kyrka
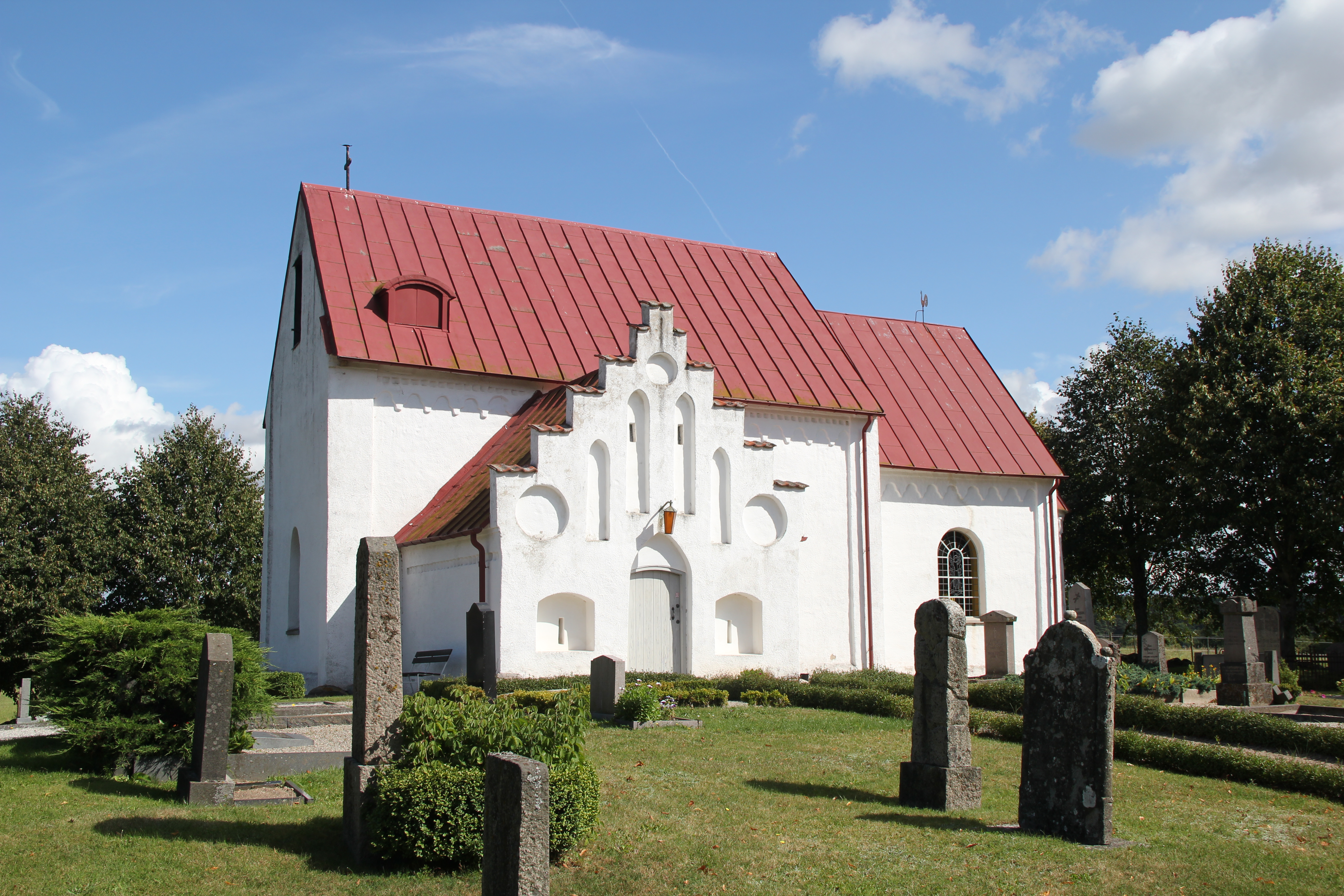
- Björka Church

- Location within Skåne Location within Sweden Location within Europe
- 55°39′25″N 13°38′06″E
- Country: Sweden
- Denomination: Church of Sweden

Björka Church (Swedish: Björka kyrka) is a medieval church in Björka, a village in Sjöbo Municipality, Scania, Sweden. It belongs to the Church of Sweden.

== History ==
The church dates from the middle of the 13th century, with only the vaults supporting the ceiling added later, in the 15th century. The church porch is also from the late Middle Ages. An external, wooden belfry has existed, according to a note from 1796, but has today vanished. The church was renovated in 1929, and in 1951 electrical heating was installed. In 1977 a new church organ was installed and in 1985 the interior was renovated.

== Architecture and furnishings ==
The building material of the church is bricks, rather unusually for a medieval church in Scania. It is a rare example in Scania of a medieval church whose walls have remained basically untouched since its construction period. Inside, the pews are from the 17th century, painted in the 18th century. The rood cross is medieval, from the late 15th century. Between 1905 and 1985 it was kept in the Historical Museum at Lund University in Lund. The cross is made of oak and the sculpture of birch wood; the rood depicts the crucified Christ, flanked by the pentinent and the impenitent thief. The altarpiece is from the 17th century, and the baptismal font a locally crafted wrought iron piece from the 18th or 19th century.
