= Hellvi Church =

- Hellvi kyrka
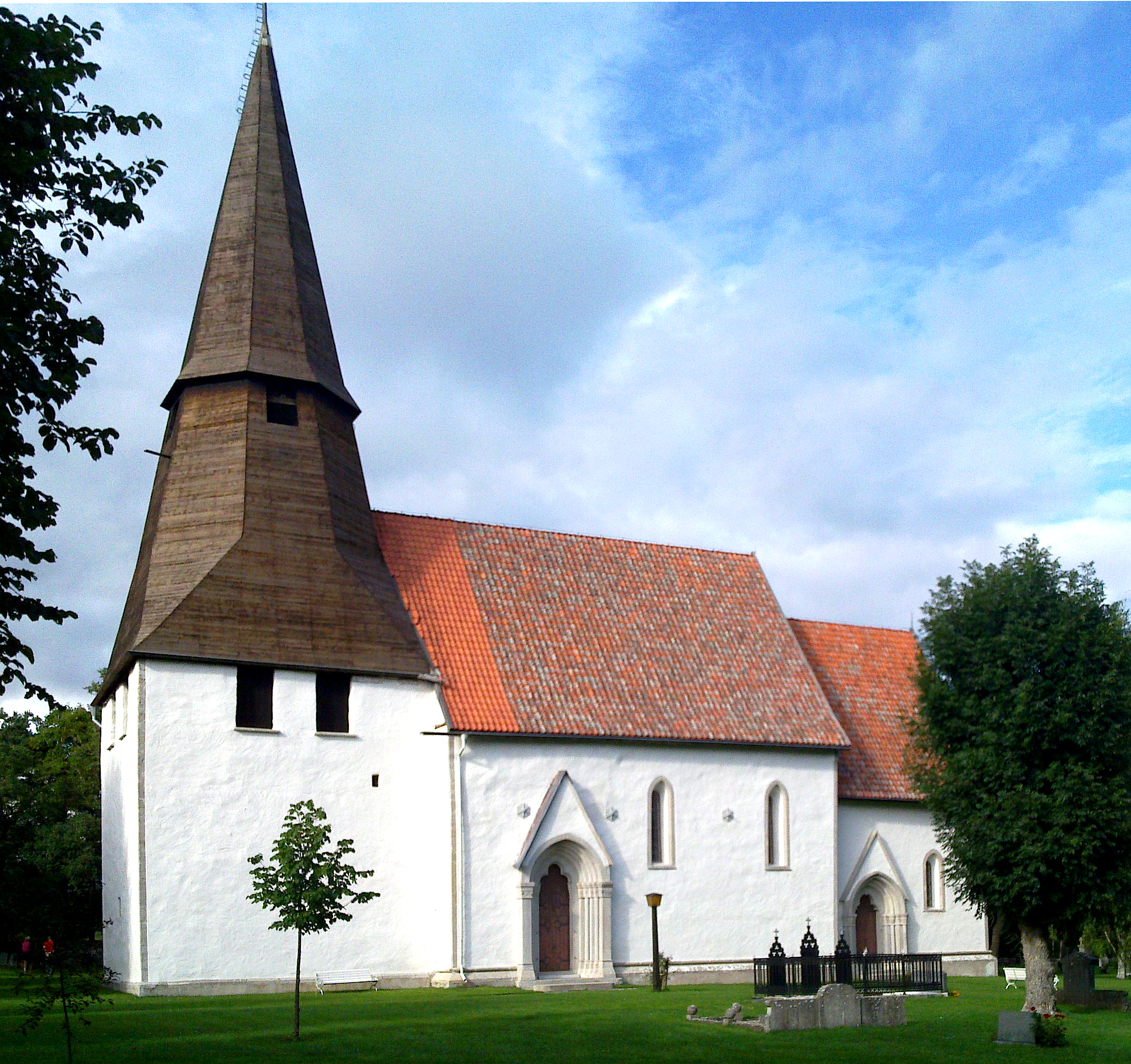
- Hellvi Church, view of the exterior

- Location on Gotland
- 57°46′30″N 18°53′43″E
- Country: Sweden
- Denomination: Church of Sweden

Administration
- Diocese: Visby

Hellvi Church (Swedish: Hellvi kyrka) is a medieval church in Hellvi on the Swedish island of Gotland. It is used by the Church of Sweden and lies in the Diocese of Visby.

== History and architecture ==
The choir portal of Hellvi Church carries a runic inscription which proclaims that a man called Lafrans Botvidarson built the church. The oldest part of the church is the tower, Romanesque in style. The upper part of the tower collapsed following a storm in 1534, hence its unusual shape. The nave and choir date from the middle of the 13th century and display an early form of Gothic style. The nave consists of two aisles, divided by two central columns. The choir is square in form and the church lacks an apse; the straight eastern wall has a group of three Gothic windows.

The altarpiece bears the initials of the Swedish king Charles XII and the date 1726. The pulpit is older, from 1633. A gallery that today is placed in the north-western corner of the interior was built in 1704 and paid for by 16 skippers from Sønderborg in Denmark; a testimony to intense maritime contacts. It is decorated with pictures of the apostles, Christ and two saints. The baptismal font is from the 17th century but with a copper dish from 1704; the latter also a gift by a Sønderborg skipper.

A renovation of the church was carried out in 1926.
