= 2021 Lejre municipal election =

- 16 November 2021

All 25 seats to the Lejre Municipal Council 13 seats needed for a majority
- Turnout: 16,427 (74.1%) ▼4.2pp
	First party	Second party	Third party
	V	A	F
Party	Venstre	Social Democrats	Green Left
Last election	8 seats, 25.4%	6 seats, 23.5%	5 seats, 17.5%
Seats won	8	6	4
Seat change	0	0	▼1
Popular vote	4,558	3,489	2,454
Percentage	28.2%	21.6%	15.2%
Swing	▲2.8%	▼1.9%	▼2.3%
	Fourth party	Fifth party	Sixth party
	C	Ø	B
Party	Conservatives	Red–Green Alliance	Social Liberals
Last election	2 seats, 9.1%	1 seat, 4.2%	1 seat, 3.4%
Seats won	4	1	1
Seat change	▲2	0	0
Popular vote	2,202	1,123	629
Percentage	13.6%	6.9%	3.9%
Swing	▲4.5%	▲2.7%	▲0.5%
	Seventh party
	O
Party	Danish People's Party
Last election	2 seats, 8.1%
Seats won	1
Seat change	▼1
Popular vote	565
Percentage	3.5%
Swing	▼4.6%
Mayor before election
Carsten Rasmussen
Social Democrats
Mayor after election
Tina Mandrup
Venstre

The Green Left and the Social Democrats had won the mayor's position following the elections that had been held in Lejre Municipality since the 2007 municipal reform. The traditional red bloc had won 13 of the 25 seats in the last election, which saw Carsten Rasmussen from the Social Democrats win the mayor's position.

Mandag Morgen who had published an article prediciting the 98 mayors that would follow the 2017 Danish local elections, expected him to win re-election.

However, the result would not end this way. Conservatives, Green Left and Danish People's Party would be the parties that would have a change in number of seats won. While the latter two both lost a seat, the Conservatives gained 2. This meant that the traditional blue bloc now had 13 seats and a majority. This led to Tina Mandrup from Venstre becoming mayor.

== Electoral system ==
For elections to Danish municipalities, a number varying from 9 to 31 are chosen to be elected to the municipal council. The seats are then allocated using the D'Hondt method and a closed list proportional representation. Lejre Municipality had 25 seats in 2021

Unlike in Danish General Elections, in elections to municipal councils, electoral alliances are allowed.

== Electoral alliances ==
=== Electoral Alliance 1 ===
Party		Political alignment
D	New Right	Right-wing to Far-right
V	Venstre	Centre-right

=== Electoral Alliance 2 ===
Party		Political alignment
I	Liberal Alliance	Centre-right to Right-wing
O	Danish People's Party	Right-wing to Far-right

=== Electoral Alliance 3 ===
Party		Political alignment
B	Social Liberals	Centre to Centre-left
C	Conservatives	Centre-right

=== Electoral Alliance 4 ===
Party		Political alignment
A	Social Democrats	Centre-left
F	Green Left	Centre-left to Left-wing

== Results by polling station ==
L = Lokalisten Levende Landsbyer

Division	A	B	C	D	F	I	L	O	V	Ø
Division	%	%	%	%	%	%	%	%	%	%
Hyllinge-Lyndby	26.8	2.2	10.6	4.3	10.2	2.2	1.1	4.0	33.7	4.9
Rye	25.4	4.1	11.8	4.5	13.3	2.2	0.9	4.3	27.7	5.8
Sæby-Gershøj	24.4	1.8	10.4	2.8	16.6	1.0	1.8	4.3	31.6	5.2
Sonnerup	25.9	3.3	14.1	4.6	11.4	1.2	3.2	5.1	27.7	3.3
Gevninge	17.4	2.8	12.7	3.0	14.3	1.3	1.5	3.3	36.6	7.0
Kr.Såby	18.6	2.3	21.9	3.5	18.3	1.4	4.8	5.0	19.6	4.6
Hvalsø	27.4	4.2	14.9	2.1	17.2	1.3	1.9	3.1	17.6	10.3
Glim	16.6	3.5	12.1	3.6	15.9	2.6	3.1	4.3	30.0	8.3
Lejre	10.7	4.9	13.5	1.2	21.5	0.7	5.0	0.9	31.5	10.0
Osted	20.0	8.3	12.8	4.4	11.2	2.3	1.3	3.1	31.1	5.5

== Results ==
Party		Votes	%	+/-	Seats	+/-
Lejre Municipality
V	Venstre	4,558	28.16	+2.79	8	0
A	Social Democrats	3,489	21.56	-1.92	6	0
F	Green Left	2,454	15.16	-2.36	4	-1
C	Conservatives	2,202	13.61	+4.51	4	+2
Ø	Red-Green Alliance	1,123	6.94	+2.78	1	0
B	Social Liberals	629	3.89	+0.50	1	0
O	Danish People's Party	565	3.49	-4.57	1	-1
D	New Right	523	3.23	+2.31	0	0
L	Lokallisten Levende Landsbyer	385	2.38	New	0	New
I	Liberal Alliance	257	1.59	-1.48	0	0
Total		16,185	100	N/A	25	N/A
Invalid votes		42	0.19	+0.04		
Blank votes		200	0.90	+0.09		
Turnout		16,427	74.13	-4.16		
Source: valg.dk
