= Historical Museum at Lund University =

Museum in Lund, Sweden

- Historiska museet vid Lunds universitet
- The museum building, constructed 1840-45, north of Krafts torg (2024)
- Established: 1805; 221 years ago
- Location: Krafts torg 1, Lund, Sweden
- Coordinates: 55°42′15.5″N 13°11′42.27″E
- Type: History museum Archaeology museum
- Collections: Paleolithic to Early modern period
- Collection size: 11 million objects
- Founder: Anders Jahan Retzius
- Director: Christian Mühlenbock
- Website: www.historiskamuseet.lu.se/english

The Historical Museum at Lund University (Swedish: Historiska museet vid Lunds universitet) is a museum in Lund, southern Sweden. It was founded in 1805 and primarily houses collections related to regional prehistory and the Middle Ages, as well as to Lund Cathedral.

It is a museum of regional history and archaeology, whose exhibition spaces are located in the Lundagård park in the historic old town of Lund, on Krafts torg, in the immediate vicinity of the medieval cathedral in the southern Swedish province of Scania.

The museum preserves archaeological finds from Scania, with the exception of finds from the city center of Lund and the municipality of Malmö. In addition, the museum has regional responsibility for ecclesiastical art and coins. The collections contain approximately 11 million individual objects, including finds from the archaeological excavations at the Iron Age settlement in Uppåkra, south of the city.

== History ==
The museum, like the Lund Zoological Museum and the Lund Botanical Museum, has its roots in the cabinet of curiosities, Museum Stobeanum, founded by Kilian Stobæus and donated to Lund University in 1735. The museum included a collection of animals of all kinds, gastropods, insects, and geological, ethnographic, and archaeological object. This collection was housed at Kungshuset, in Lundagård. After the death of Stobaeus, the university also purchased his coin collection. Throughout the rest of the 18th century, the collection grew through various additions.

In 1788, Professor Anders Jahan Retzius proposed that the ethnographic and cultural-historical collections at the university library and the natural history museum be merged with the university’s coin collection to form a “Museum Historicum.” However, this did not become a reality until 1805, which marks the year the Historical Museum was founded.

In 1805, it was decided to split the collection: the natural history collection went to the Zoological and Botanical Museum, while the historical and ethnographic objects formed the Historical Museum. Over time, the museum’s holdings grew to include numerous objects discovered during archaeological excavations in the region. Its collections were used in the teaching of archaeology. As its collections grew, the museum was relocated several times, finally settling in 1918 in its current building on Krafts torg, in Lundagård.

== The Museum Building ==
South facade, Krafts torg (2024)

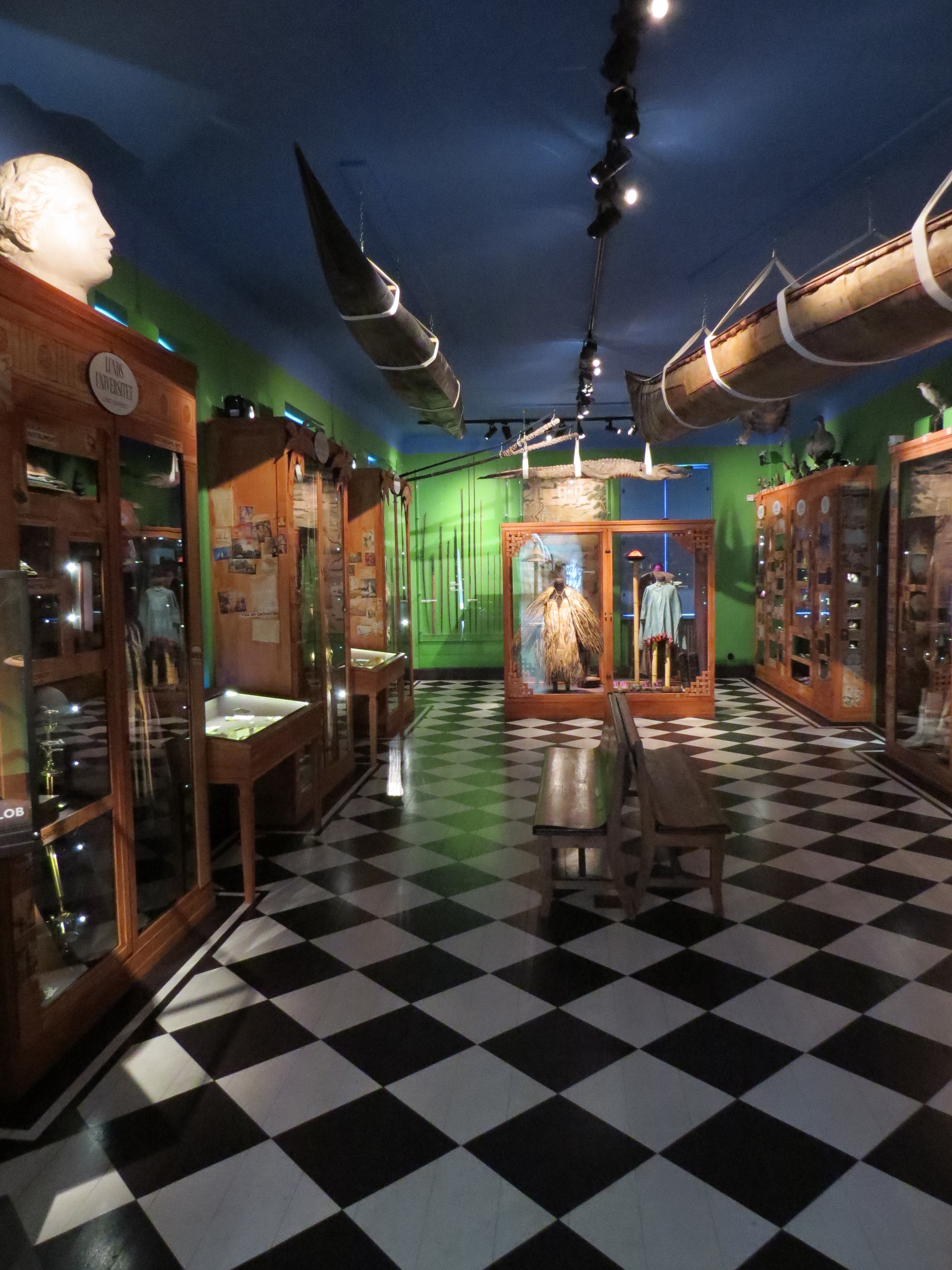
Interior of the museum

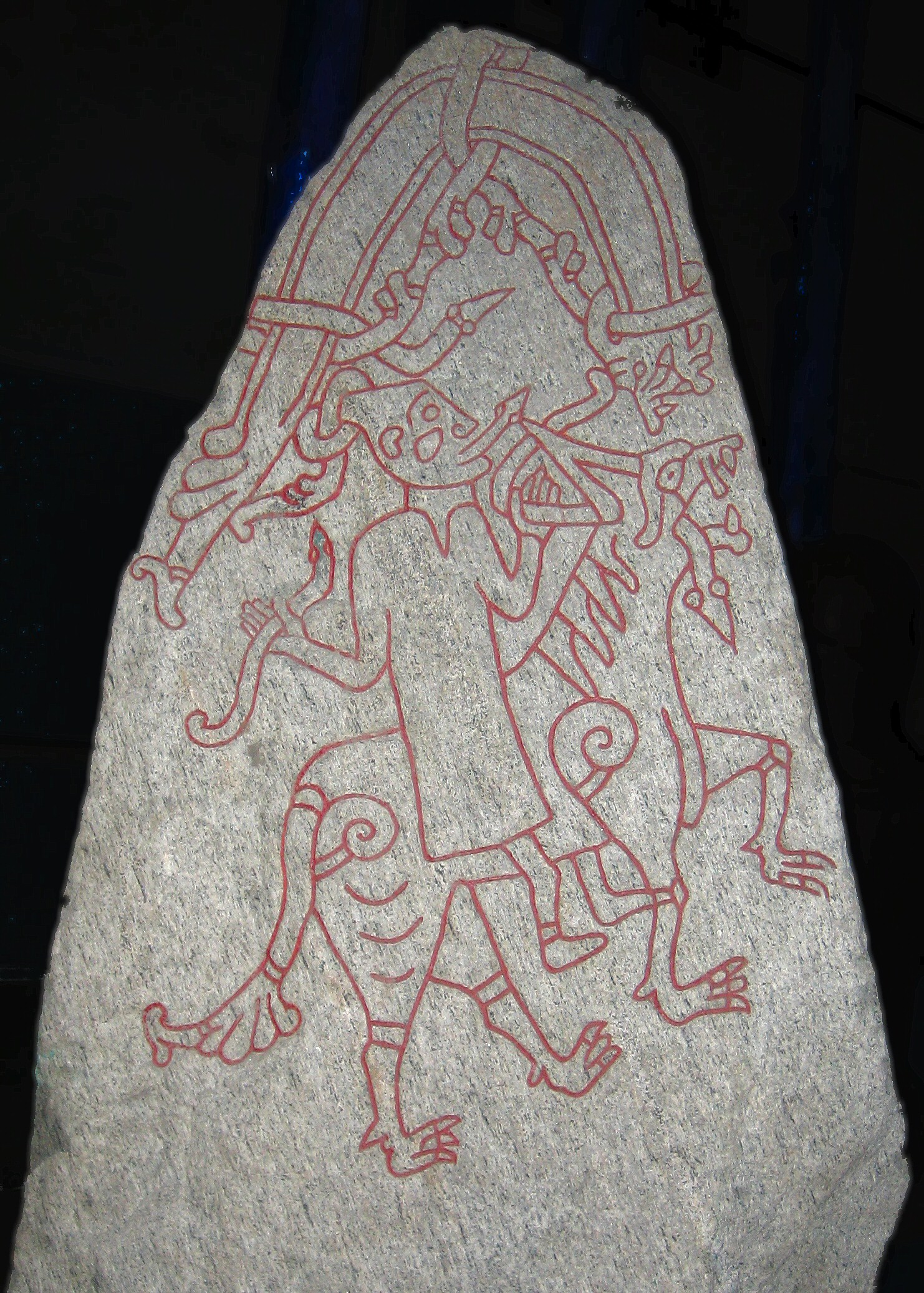
Picture stone from the Hunnestad Monument. It is believed that the depicted creatures are the giantess Hyrrokkin riding on her wolf.

Peder Pedersen Winstrup (1605 – 1679), painting labeled "1671–1676"

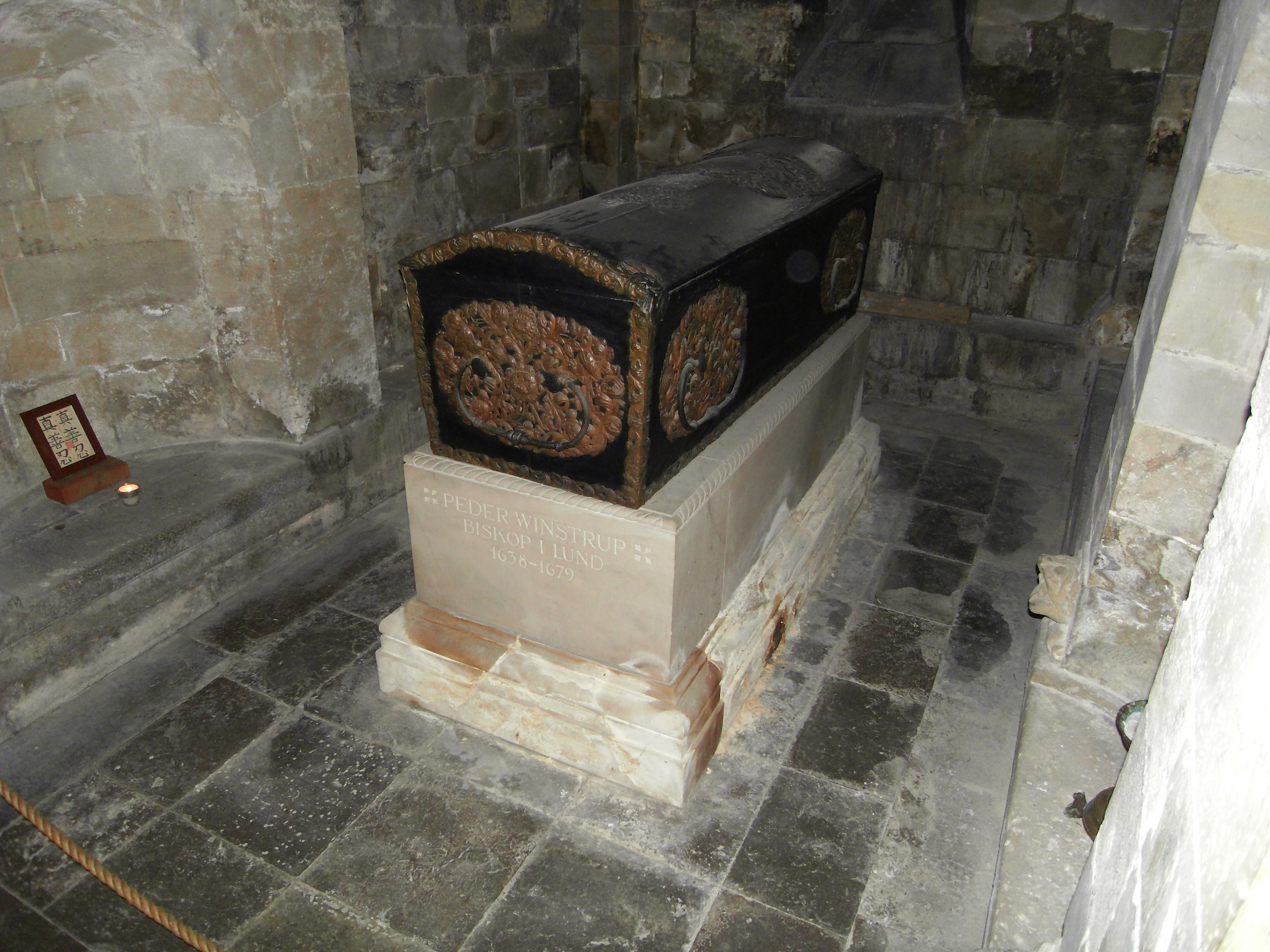
Peder Winstrup's coffin in Lund Cathedral

The building was constructed between 1840 and 1845 as a bishop’s residence based on designs by Professor Axel Fredrik Nyström and was influenced by the architecture of Karl Friedrich Schinkel.

In 1848, the church exchanged the building with the university for another building, and the university’s zoology, chemistry, and physics departments moved in. From 1886 to 1916, the building was managed solely by the zoology department and was known at that time as the Zoological Museum. In 1917, the building underwent extensive renovation under the direction of cathedral architect Theodor Wåhlin. Otto Rydbeck was the museum’s director at that time. Thanks to the close collaboration between Rydbeck and Wåhlin, the museum became one of the most modern of its time when it opened in 1918.

In December 2005, the main entrance to Krafts torg was restored. The building has been a listed building since 1994. In 2018—the same year the Historical Museum celebrated its first century in the building—a new, glass entrance was constructed. At the same time, the entrance was renovated and equipped with a new reception area, a gift shop, and a new educational workshop for children.

== The Museum’s Collections ==
The collections of the Historical Museum contain around 11 million objects dating from the Paleolithic era to the Early modern period, including finds from the Iron Age settlement of Uppåkra. It is the largest archaeological museum in southern Sweden.

A new Iron Age exhibition is underway, the entire top floor will have tons of finds from the Iron Age in Scania, and one of the galleries will have a special focus on Uppåkra. The exhibition is scheduled to open in late 2026.

The museum’s mission includes the preservation of archaeological material, early ecclesiastical art, and coin finds from throughout Scania. In 2008, the museum also took over the collection of the Lund University Museum of Antiquities. Exhibitions include objects from Scania’s Stone and Bronze Ages, as well as an ethnographic exhibition. The coin exhibition includes, among other things, huge copper coins from the legendary Loshult Coup of 1676. The exhibitions cover four floors and include the Antiquities Hall on the top floor where statues and a gallery of historical figures are on display. Medieval sculptures of saints and gold and silver objects come from churches in Scania. Lund Cathedral has its own section, featuring architectural details and unique vestments from various eras.

=== Hunnestad Monument ===
The Hunnestad Monument may have been the most magnificent runestone monument in the Nordic region, featuring both images and inscriptions. It was once located at Hunnestad near Ystad. The monument was depicted in the 17th century as consisting of eight stones. In the 18th century, the monument was dismantled, and in the 19th century, three stones were rediscovered and are now housed at the Historical Museum. For a long time they were considered the only stones remaining, but in 2020 a fourth stone was discovered during excavations for a sewage line in Ystad Municipality.

== Peder Winstrup’s Mummy ==
Peder Winstrup was the last Danish and first Swedish bishop in Lund. (Lund belonged to Denmark until 1658). He was also the driving force behind the founding of a university in the city. After his death in 1679, he has rested in the cathedral crypt, but in 2013, the Cathedral Parish decided that his remains should be reinterred in the cemetery. The Historical Museum took the initiative to conduct an interdisciplinary scientific examination of Winstrup’s remains.

In November 2013, the coffin was opened in the crypt, and it was found that Winstrup’s body was very well preserved. In December 2014, a CT scan was performed at Skåne University Hospital in Lund. A sensational discovery was that the internal organs were found to be intact. The body had been air-dried—a natural mummification process.

Winstrup’s mummy is one of the best-preserved bodies from 17th-century Europe. His remains constitute a unique medical-historical archive for understanding the living conditions and health of people in the 17th century and now provide insights, for example, into the origins of tuberculosis, a disease from which the bishop is believed to have suffered.

In a study presented on August 14, 2020, researchers from the Max Planck Institute of Geoanthropology (Germany), Lund University, and the Swedish Museum of Natural History in Stockholm reported that DNA analysis of Winstrup’s lung tissue had yielded the highest-quality Mycobacterium tuberculosis genome to date, suggesting a more recent (i.e. Neolithic) origin of the bacterium in humans than previously thought.

To the astonishment of the experts, the coffin also contained the body of a fetus just a few months old. A comparison of the genes of the stillborn boy and the deceased bishop revealed a 25 percent match. According to the researchers involved, the kinship was through the father’s line, which is why they consider a grandfather-to-grandson relationship likely.

== Gallery ==
Seafood dish, Campania, approximately 310 BCE

Find from Uppåkra, probably dating from 100 - 900 CE, possibly a lion

Stirrup-shaped fibula with an arch, made of gold and garnets, ca. 500 CE, from the Temple of Uppåkra

Torc, Scandinavian Bronze Age, Late Period (Period VI), 600–500 BCE

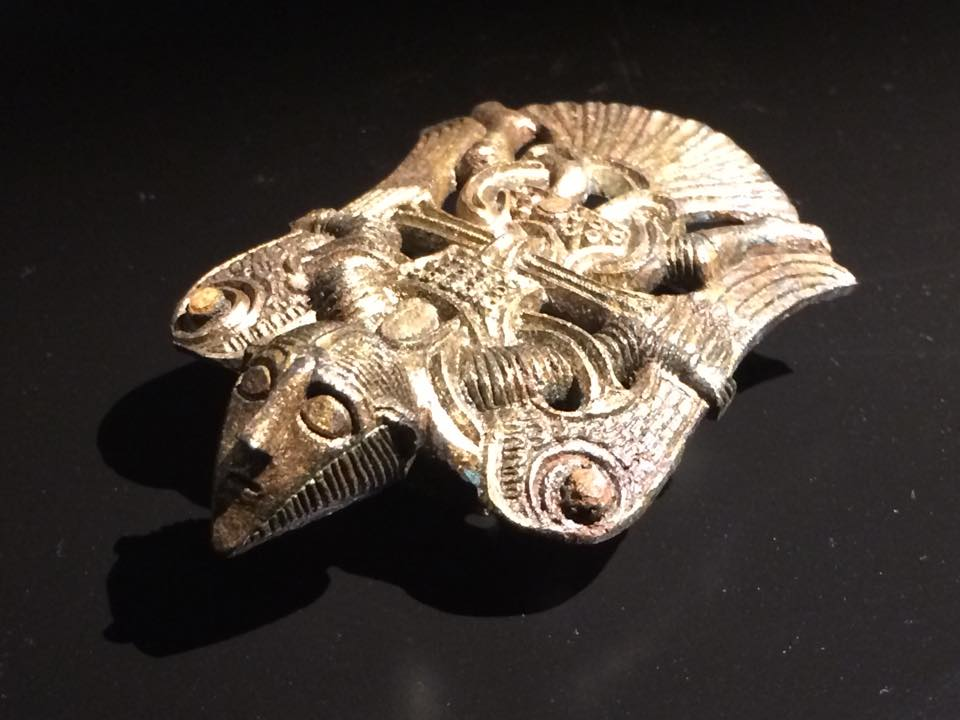
Possibly Wayland the Smith, bronze, found just outside the southern wall of the hall, Uppåkra. In the Poetic Edda, Wayland is taken captive and then escapes with the help of a bird suit he made himself.

Bracelets, Viking Age, Häljarp Treasure, silver

A fragment of Descartes' skull and its container, taken in 1666 during the transfer of his remains from Stockholm to Paris

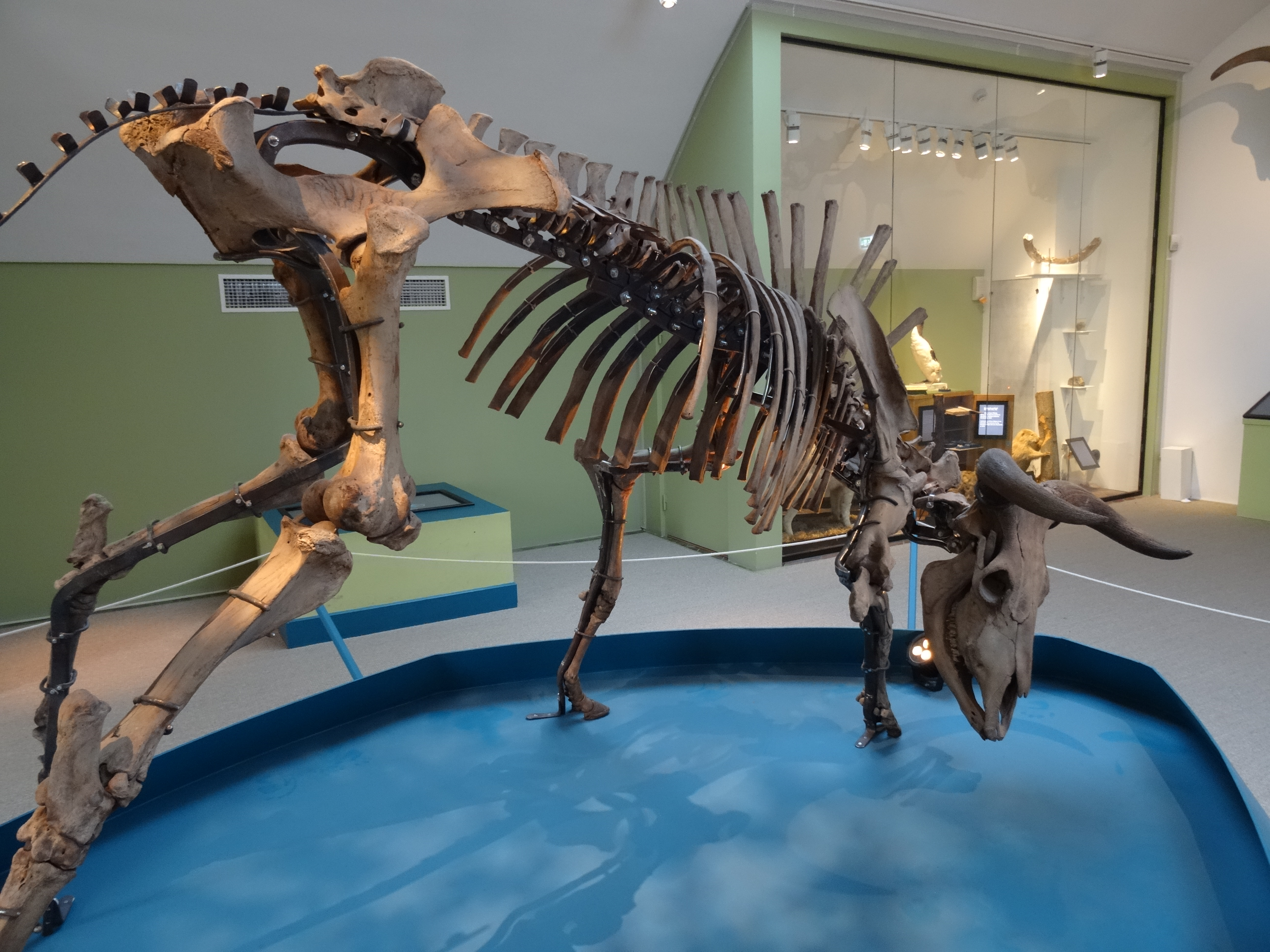
Aurochs, unearthed in a peat bog in Önnarp in 1840. It had been shot in the spine by Stone Age people - remnants of an arrow were found in its back. It lived approximately between 8400 and 8000 BCE. It is the largest and best-preserved aurochs skeleton found in Scania.

Door, ca. 1400, from Torrlösa, Scania

Pennsylvania, "Indian" idol, made from a shell from the Dutch Caribbean, ca. 1719–1731

Egyptian mummy from the Middle Kingdom, purchased in Saqqara in 1733

Sandstone capital from Bösarp, Scania

== See also ==
- Kulturen
- History of Scania
- Scanian Law
- Uppåkra temple
- Skåne lockbow
- Hunnestad Monument
- Swedish History Museum
- Malmö Museum
