= Hellvi =

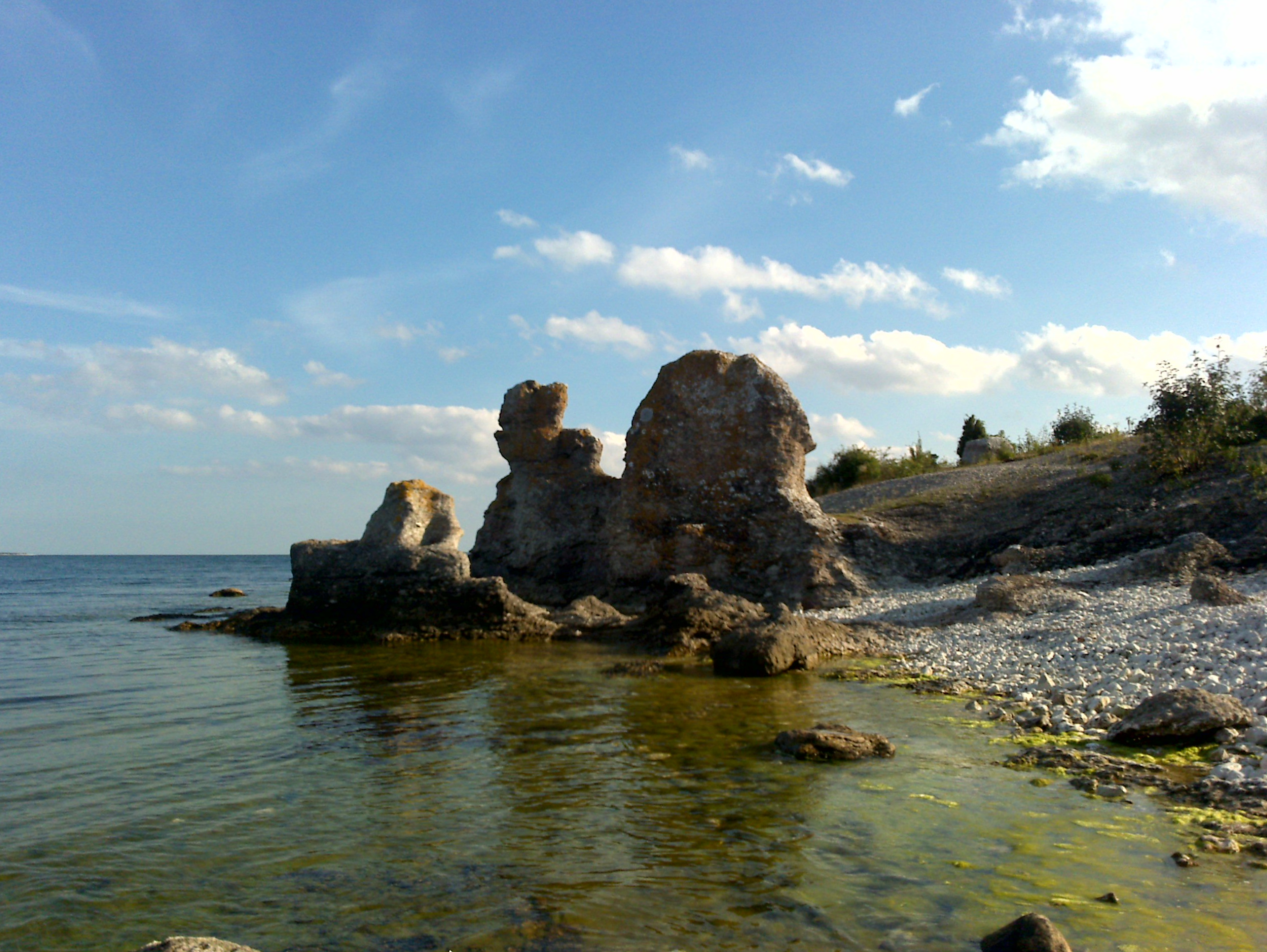
- Stacks at St Olofsholm in Hellvi

- Location within Gotland
- Coordinates: 57°46′30″N 18°53′42″E
- Country: Sweden
- Province: Gotland
- County: Gotland County
- Municipality: Gotland Municipality

Area
  - Total: 40.32 km^{2} (15.57 sq mi)

Population (2016)
  - Total: 177
- Time zone: UTC+1 (CET)
  - Summer (DST): UTC+2 (CEST)

Hellvi is a populated area, a socken (not to be confused with parish), on the Swedish island of Gotland. It comprises the same area as the administrative Hellvi District, established on 1 January 2016.

A Roman bronze mask from the 1st century has been found in Hellvi.

== Geography ==
Hellvi is situated in the east coast of northern of Gotland. The socken has a long coastline with several bays and islands. It comprises most of Lake Fardume (Fardume Träsk) along with Storholmen island in the middle of the lake. The St Olofsholm peninsula makes up the south tip of Hellvi. Just west of the peninsula are Ytterholmen and Hojskär islands.

Hellvi has seven nature reserves: Lörgeudd, Malms-Kyllaj, St Olofsholm, Sajgs, Ytterholmen, Storholmen and Träskvidar. There are stack areas in St Olofsholm and Kyllaj.

The medieval Hellvi Church is situated in the socken. On St Olofsholm peninsula is the ruin of the medieval Saint Olaf Chapel. As of 2019, Hellvi Church belongs to Forsa parish in Norra Gotlands pastorat, along with the churches in Lärbro, Hangvar, Hall and Hallshuk.

== History ==
=== Bronze mask ===
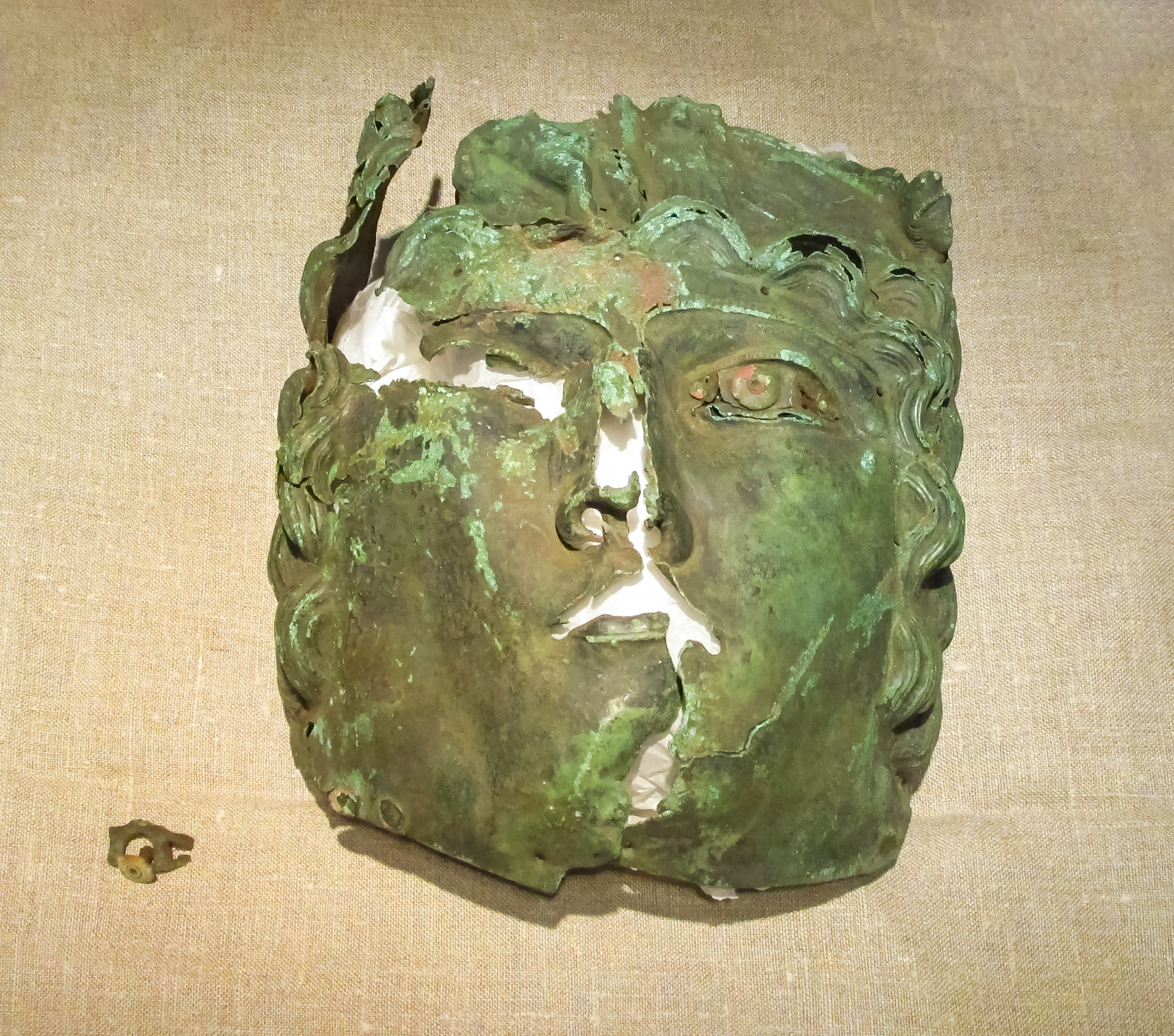
The Hellvi bronze mask

In the 1980s, a ceremonial bronze mask made for the Roman cavalry, was found in Hellvi with the use of a metal detector. It was kept in the finder's home until that person died, a friend inherited the mask and turned it over to the Gotland County Administrative Board in the winter of 2010. It was made in the 1st century, depicting Alexander the Great and it probably came to Gotland around 300–400. On the forehead of the mask is an image of Hercules with his club and the Nemean lion's skin. When found, the mask was missing one eye, the remaining eye was made of silver and probably added later. The following summer, 2011, an archaeological excavation was made at the site where the mask was originally found. The site was an old stone foundation of a house, abandoned sometime during the 7th century. The second eye along with some other objects, such as drinking horns were discovered during the excavation. The mask was not buried but probably kept in the house along with the drinking horns. A posthole where the mask was found and some rivet holes on the mask suggests that it may have been mounted on a pole.

=== Hellvi helmet eyebrow ===
Another significant find from Hellvi is the Hellvi helmet eyebrow.
