= Uppåkra temple =

Archaeological site in Sweden

Coordinates: 55°39′53.39″N 13°10′11.81″E

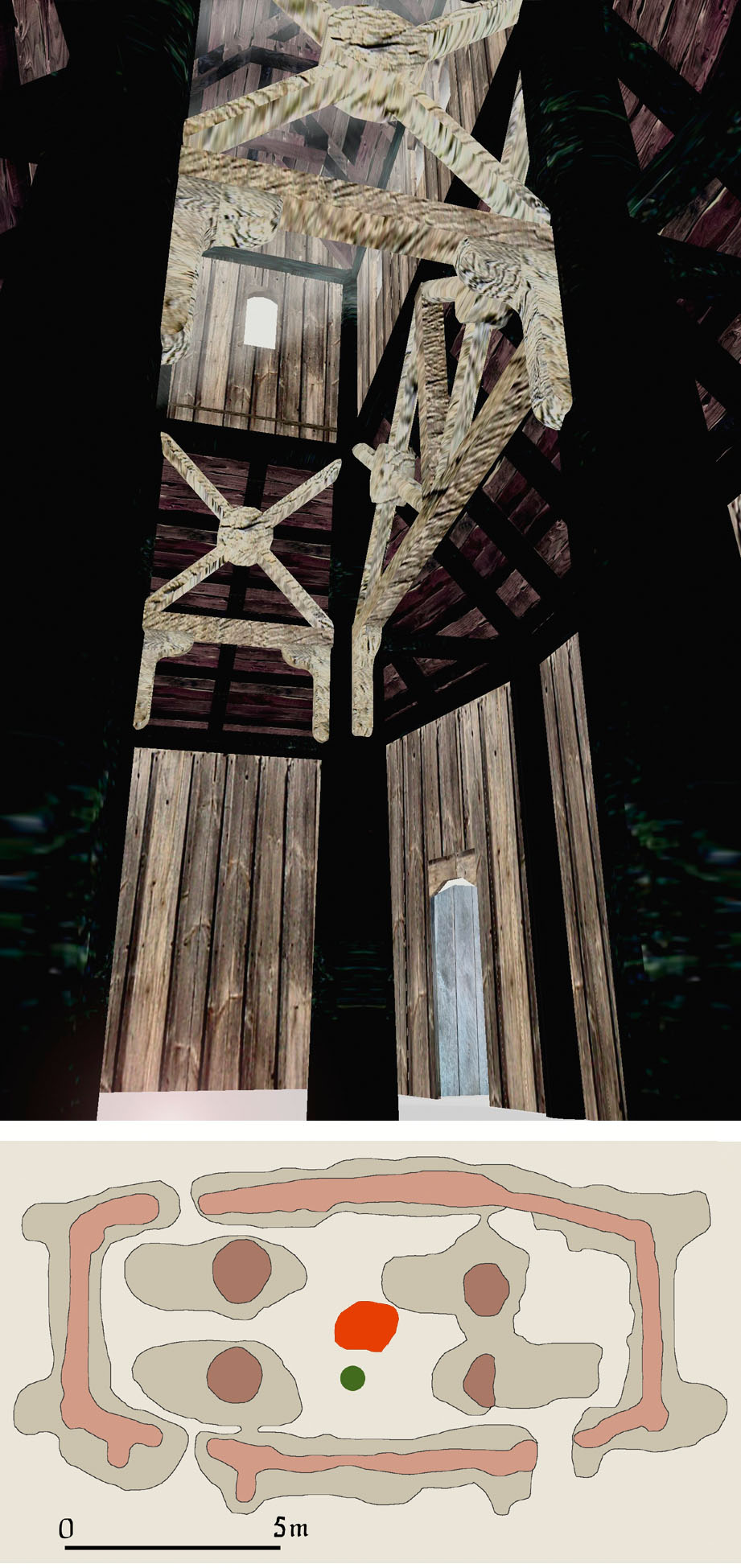
The temple at Uppåkra. Top: reconstructed view of the interior; bottom: plan of excavation, showing locations of wall trenches (pink), central columns (brown), hearth (red), and beaker and glass bowl (green). Sven Rosborn (2006)

Uppåkra temple are the remains of an Iron Age building interpreted as the possible remains of a temple were excavated in Uppåkra, south of Lund in Scania, Sweden, from 2000 to 2004.

The building was rebuilt six times on the same floor plan, on the site of an older (3rd century) longhouse, and was likely in existence during the 6th to 10th centuries. It measured 13 by 6.5 meters (43 by 21 ft) and had three doors. The central part was elevated and supported by four pillars. Lars Larsson (2007) argued that the find represents "the first Scandinavian building for which the term 'temple' can be justly claimed".

== Building ==
The remains of the building consist of holes and trenches for the placement of the pillars and walls that once stood there. Various floor levels were discernible, and it was possible to determine that the building was originally erected in the 3rd century on the site of an unusually large longhouse, and then rebuilt six times without appreciable changes, the last version of the building dating to the early Viking Age. The building material was in all cases wood, which was also sunk into the ground.

The building was 13 meters long and 6.5 meters wide. The walls on the long sides were made of slightly convex, rough-cut oak posts or "staves," which were sunk into a trench in the earth more than one meter deep. At each corner of the building stood a pillar or corner-post. The central part of the building, which stood free of the outer walls, was formed by four gigantic wooden columns. The holes for these and for the corner-posts are unusually wide and more than two meters deep, and stone packing found in three of the center holes indicates columns at least 0.7 meters in diameter.

The building had three entrances, two in the south and one in the north. Each opening had hefty posts on either side, and the southwestern had a projecting section in addition. That must therefore have been the main entrance of the hof. This has been interpreted as the men's entrance, the entrance on the north side as the women's entrance, and the southeastern entrance as for the priest, on the model of stone churches.

Two large iron door rings were found, one in the fill around a post, the other about 10 meters from the building.

The outer walls of the building were of so-called stave-construction, as in palisade churches and later stave churches, with strong corner posts. The technique can be recognized from the preserved remnants of palisade churches in Lund dating to about 1050. The tops of the vertical posts or staves must have been slotted into a horizontal log or wall plate, called a lejd in Swedish (stavlægje in Norwegian), which was seated on the corner posts. The deep trench in which the staves were sunk together with the deep holes for the corner posts indicate that the outer walls must have been high. The purpose of the holes was to resist the lateral pressures so that the walls did not collapse. In Hemse Stave Church, Gotland, wall staves three meters long were found preserved from the early timber church. An above-ground height of up to four meters for the outer walls of the hof is therefore not impossible.

=== Reconstructions ===
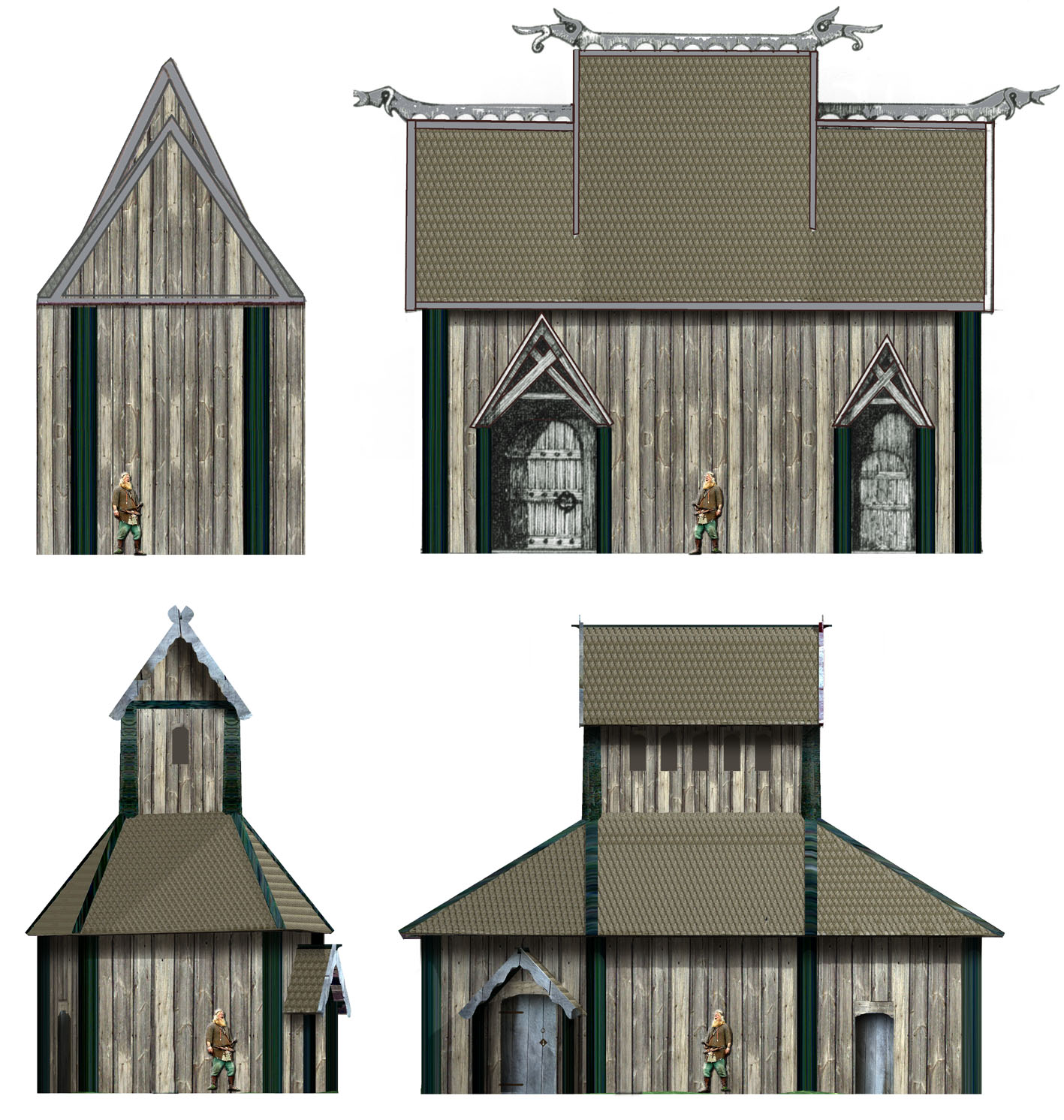
Two reconstructions of the hof at Uppåkra, Sweden. Top: Lunda; bottom: Foteviken

Reconstructions of the appearance of the hof at Uppåkra have assumed it looked like a stave church. In 2004 the Foteviken Museum published a reconstruction with the four central columns interpreted as the framework for a tower. The roof was clad in wood shakes, which indicate a fairly steep roof. From the side wall to the tower wall, there must have been a rise of a good two meters. The two-meter-deep postholes indicate a very strong construction, not least since the four columns formed a square, which made possible effective cross-bracing (as depicted in the above illustration). With a suggested height of ten meters for its columns, the roof of the tower would have protruded a full three meters over the roof ridge of the nave.

A second reconstruction, Lunda, was published in 2006. In the latter, the artist opted not to interpret the imposing dimensions of the four central columns and the tremendous depth to which they were sunk in terms of a tower, but instead to extend the outer walls up to a tremendous height, almost six meters. The two interpretations are represented together for comparison here.

== Associated finds ==
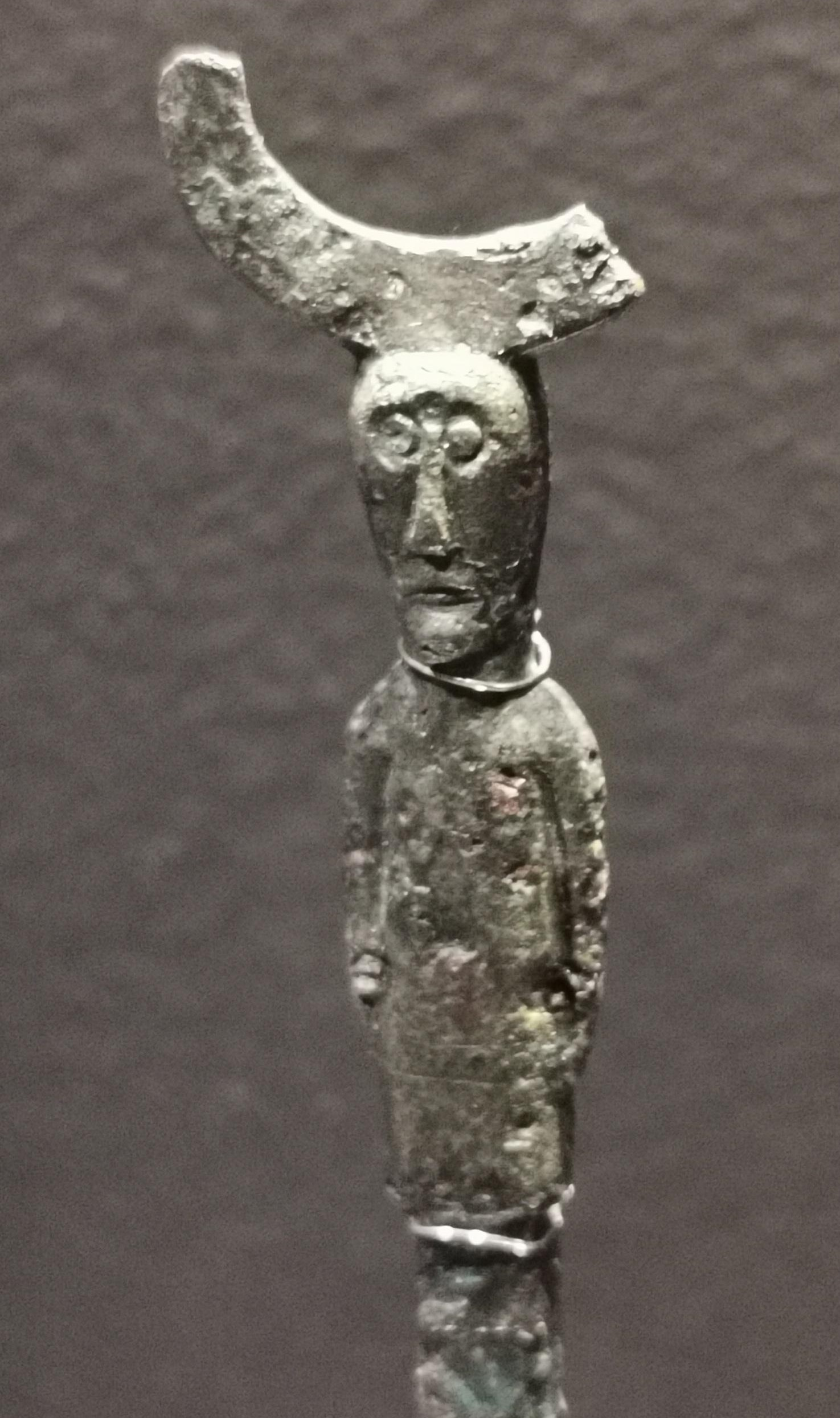
Odin of Uppåkra - a figurine found at the site with one eye intentionally hollowed out

In the wall trenches and the post holes, the excavators found roughly two hundred so-called gullgubber, the most found at any site in Sweden. These are small pieces of gold foil with incised human figures. Their size indicates that these cannot have served as examples of gold for trade without having a connection to religious worship. Finding such large numbers of them where the posts and walls of the Uppåkra hof stood indicates that they were offered in association with the erection of the temple. Those found at Uppåkra resemble those found at the Sorte Muld ("black earth") site on the Danish island of Bornholm, some even being made from the same molds. Most of them depict male figures, a smaller number depict females, and a few depict male-female couples.

North of the building, a large number of weapons were found, many of them deliberately broken like the offerings left in Danish bogs. Spear-points were most numerous, followed by fragmented shields. They had been placed on top of layers of stones, and with them were bones, some human. Some weaponry was also found south of the building. It is possible that these had previously been stored in the hof.

Immediately beyond the west end of the building was a concentration of fire-cracked stones and animal bones; there was a paved area just south of it, southwest of the building. A few meters further to the west there had been a small building; a gold bracteate was found on a collapsed clay wall.

Inside the Uppåkra hof was a fireplace, near which a bronze and silver beaker, a glass bowl, and shards of about ten other glass vessels were found buried in the floor. The beaker, dated to approximately 500 C.E., is approximately 20 cm high and decorated with bands of thin gold leaf embossed with designs of humans, snakes, and horses. The bowl, roughly contemporary, is made of a clear layer of glass with a cobalt blue glass overlay cut through in a rosette pattern and comes from the region north of the Black Sea. Numerous other objects - fibulae, beads, potsherds, gold fragments - of varying dates were found in the various floor layers, suggesting a continuous tradition of offerings, and there were signs of the manufacture of gold objects near the building.

== Settlement ==
To the east of the building there had been several longhouses and firepits at different times, and several grindstones were also found buried in an almost straight line, some smashed and others intact. These may have been offerings or have supported pillars.

The building is near the center of the settlement and there are at least four burial mounds to the west and north of it, probably dating to the early Bronze Age or the early Iron Age.

== See also ==
- Heathen hof
- Temple at Uppsala
