= Skåne lockbow =

Medieval weapon

The Skåne lockbow was an early form of crossbow from Skåne or Scania, then a province of Denmark. (It has been part of southern Sweden since 1658.) An example was discovered in 1941 in Sweden. Originally thought to date from the 16th century, recent archaeological excavations have opened the possibility of an earlier date.

The lockbow was used throughout northern Europe between ca. 900-1600 CE. Modern reproductions indicate an effective range of about 75 yards (69 m) and an approximate draw weight of 170 pounds (77 kg) + or - 20lbs. It worked by drawing the bowstring back into a groove, from which it was dislodged by a wooden peg attached to the top of one end of a wooden lever. The upper part of the peg was pushed sharply upward, through a hole drilled underneath the groove holding the bowstring.

== Bibliography ==
- Payne-Gallwey, Sir Ralph, The Crossbow, Dover Press, reprinted 1995
- Wilson, G M (ed.) & Bartlett Wells, H (trans.); European crossbows: a survey, Royal Armouries, 1994
- Nicolle, D; Arms and Armour of the Crusading Era 1050–1350, Greenhill Books, 1999
- Sandy K. Albritton Crossbow Reviews and Guide 2010
- Paterson, W. F.; A guide to the crossbow, Society of Archer Antiquaries, 1990
