= Lars Larsson (archaeologist) =

Swedish archaeologist

Lars Larsson (born 1947) is a Swedish writer, photographer, and adventurer. As the Chair of prehistoric archaeology at Lund University in Sweden, Larsson has devoted most of his research career to the Stone Age in southernmost Sweden. Among his fieldwork notable excavations include the Ageröd bog, famous Late Mesolithic cemeteries at Skateholm, a Mesolithic shell midden and a Neolithic megalithic tomb in Portugal.

In the 1990s, Larsson directed excavations of Middle Palaeolithic cave settlements in northern Zimbabwe. In the 90s and 00s he has also made important contributions to the study of the 1st Millennium AD through excavations at Uppåkra near Lund.

In 1989, Larsson was elected as a member of the Royal Swedish Academy of Letters, and in 2001, member of the Royal Swedish Academy of Sciences. Beginning in 2008, he has been Head Editor of the academy's journal Fornvännen.

== Publications ==
- Larsson, Lars (December 2001). "A building for ritual use at Uppåkra, southernmost Sweden". Antiquity. 75 (290): 679–680. doi:10.1017/S0003598X00089134.
- Larsson, Lars, ed. (2004). Continuity for Centuries: A ceremonial building and its context at Uppåkra, southern Sweden (PDF). Acta Archaeologica Lundensia. Vol. 48. Stockholm: Almqvist & Wiksell International. ISBN 91-22-02107-8. Archived from the original (PDF) on 2017-07-08.
- Larsson, Lars (2011). "A ceremonial building as a 'home of the gods'? Central buildings in the central place of Uppåkra". In Grimm, Oliver & Pesch, Alexandra (eds.). The Gudme-Gudhem phenomenon: papers presented at a workshop organized by the Centre for Baltic and Scandinavian Archaeology (ZBSA), Schleswig, April 26th and 27th, 2010 (PDF). Schriften des Archäologischen Landesmuseums. Vol. 6. Neumünster: Wachholtz Verlag. pp. 189–206. ISBN 978-3-529-01876-3.
