= Uppåkra =

Swedish village

Coordinates: 55°40′N 13°10.2′E

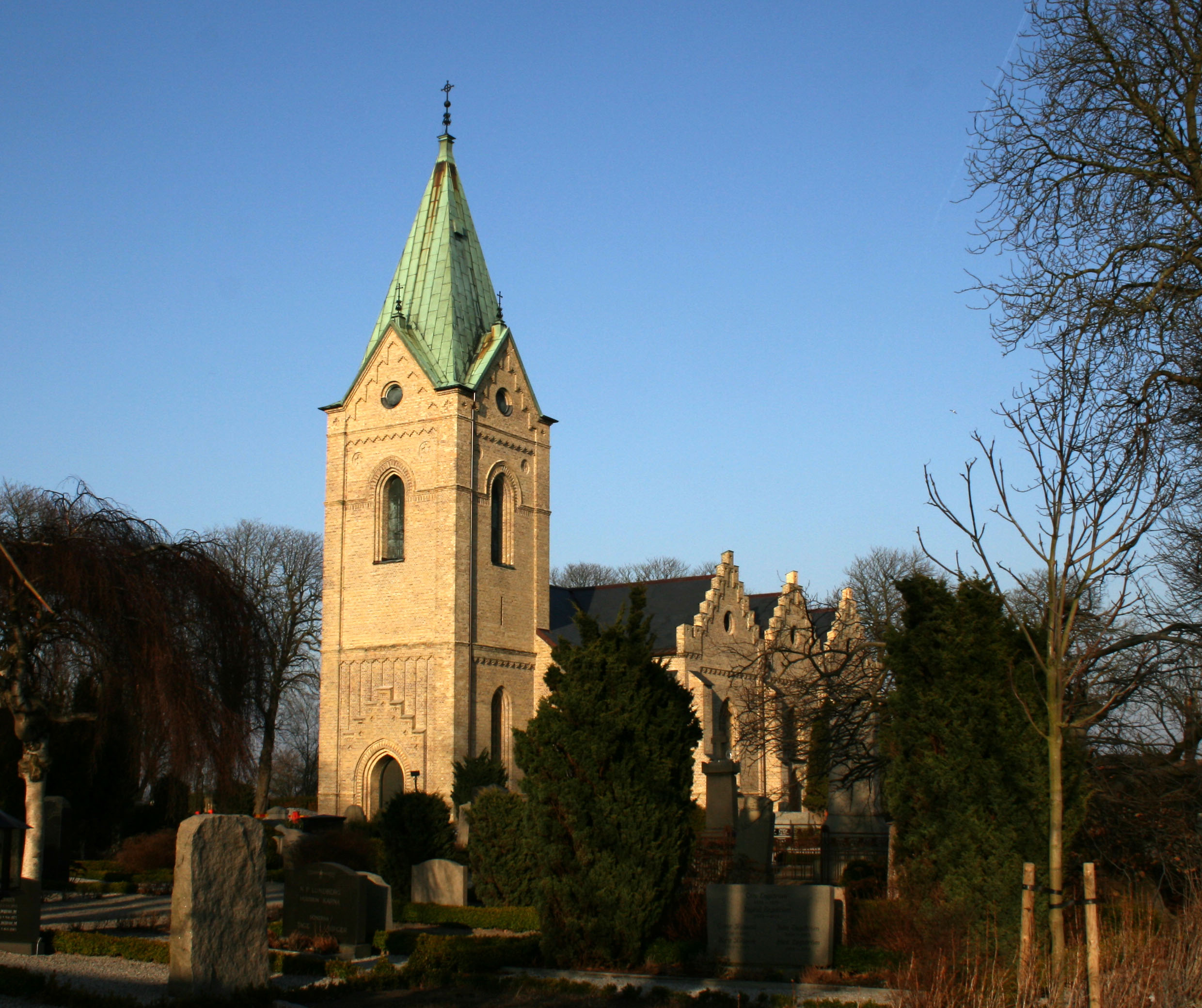
Uppåkra church, built in the 1860s on the site of the medieval church.

Uppåkra is a village and parish in Staffanstorp Municipality, in Scania, southern Sweden, located five kilometres south of Lund. The village is known for its Iron Age archaeological site, which has been actively excavated since 1996.

== History ==
Uppåkra was situated on the ancient main road between Trelleborg and Helsingborg in what was to become the Danish kingdom. The original foundation of Uppåkra is dated to the last century BC, although its importance appears to have increased in the fifth century. It seems likely that the rulers of Uppåkra by then wielded influence over most or all of West Scania, i.e. the land along the Trelleborg–Helsingborg main road, known for extraordinarily fertile plains.

Uppåkra declined and was possibly in part relocated to Lund in the 990s. Knowledge about the decline of Uppåkra and the relocation to Lund is still unsure. Hence Uppåkra is held to be the direct predecessor of the city of Lund. However, the area has been continuously inhabited since, with the two villages of Lilla Uppåkra and Stora Uppåkra mentioned as 'first and second Uppåkra' in medieval documents.

In early modern documents from the Danish era, the two villages were called Opager, which remained their name in the local dialect until the mid-20th century. Like the rest of Scania, Uppåkra was Danish until 1658, when the Treaty of Roskilde effected cessation to Sweden.

== Archaeology ==
A Bronze to Iron Age settlement was found in 1934, when a farm was built close to the church. The first excavation that year was done by the Archaeologist Bror Magnus Vifot. Geological studies carried out by a sugar company in the 1930s revealed that the site around the church of Uppåkra was extremely rich in phosphate, the highest concentration of it in Scania. Since excrement contains phosphate, this indicates the presence of many cattle and people over time. The study was conducted by Olof Arrhenius across the province of Scania.

In the middle of 1990 investigations with metal detectors revealed almost 30,000 gold, silver and bronze objects. Archaeological excavations in a 100-acre (0.40 km^{2}) field intensified in 1996: they show Uppåkra to have been among the richest and largest Iron Age–Viking Age towns on the Scandinavian Peninsula. For centuries, maybe for most of the first millennium, Uppåkra was a place of religious and political power; remains of a pre-Christian temple excavated during 2000–2004 demonstrated that it was also an important cult place.

During excavations in the summer of 2007, the remains of a building destroyed by fire were investigated. The building was situated just to the west of the temple. It was presumably a longhouse of more than 40 metres in length, built in the 5th or 6th century. The excavations also yielded a large amount of ceramic, bone, and glass artefacts, and a number of metal objects in iron, bronze and gold, including fibulae, two identically stamped bracteates, and a probable surgical instrument. One of the objects excavated in 2007, interpreted as representing an ornamental lion, made headlines due to its peculiar resemblance to Mickey Mouse.
