= Gevninge =

- Town
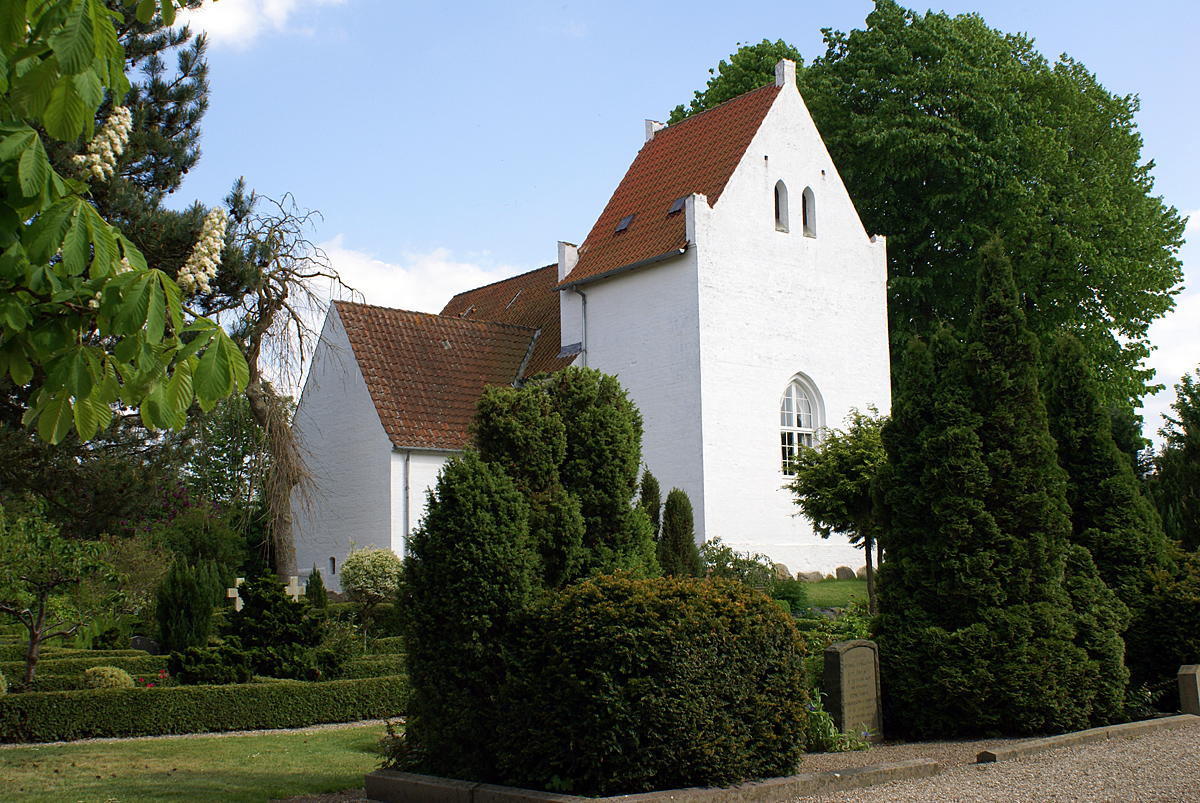
- Gevninge church

- Location in Region Zealand Gevninge (Denmark)
- Coordinates: 55°38′42″N 11°57′25″E
- Country: Denmark
- Region: Region Zealand
- Municipality: Lejre Municipality
- Established: Iron Age

Area
  - Urban: 0.81 km^{2} (0.31 sq mi)

Population (1 January 2026)
  - Urban: 1,636
  - Urban density: 2,000/km^{2} (5,200/sq mi)
- Time zone: UTC+1 (CET)
  - Summer (DST): UTC+2 (CEST)
- Postal code: DK-4000 Roskilde

Gevninge is a small town, with a population of 1,636 (1 January 2026), in Lejre Municipality on the island of Zealand in Denmark. Its old section is located alongside a small river, Lejre Å, approximately 2 kilometres (1.2 mi) from its mouth at Roskilde Fjord.

== History ==
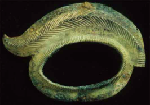
The Gevninge helmet fragment

Gevninge is a small and modern village, but its history dates back to the Iron Age. The earliest indisputable written mention of Gevninge is from 1244, when its name appeared as Giæfning; a source from 1202 may also mention the village. Archaeological finds from the area, including the Gevninge helmet fragment, show evidence of occupation during the Iron Age and Viking Age, from approximately 500 AD to 1000 AD.

Gevninge is located 3 kilometres (1.9 mi) north of Lejre, a modern-day town that is believed to have been the seat of the Scylding kings during the Iron and Viking ages. Though Lejre is also on the Lejre Å, the river that far south was likely too small for effective navigation. Gevninge may have thus served as the "port of Lejre", an outpost at which any visitor would have to disembark and pass through on the way to the capital.

In the epic Anglo-Saxon poem Beowulf, the titular hero travels to the mead hall, Heorot, the seat of King Hrothgar, on his way to kill the monster Grendel. While the tale is fictional, the anonymous author set the poem in the real world, and Hrothgar's seat of Heorot is thought today to have been located at Lejre. Upon disembarking, Beowulf and his men are met with an armed warrior who says his job is to protect the Danish shores; only after Beowulf announces his business is he escorted to Heorot. This has led to speculation that the author of Beowulf may have been familiar with the topography of the region, and imagined his hero disembarking at the site of modern-day Gevninge. For example, working through old maps and the poem of Beowulf, the scholars Gillian Overing and Marijane Osborn passed through Gevninge in an attempt to retrace the journey of Beowulf to Heorot/Lejre as described in the poem.

The fragment of a helmet discovered in Gevninge provides evidence of an armed outpost in the Iron Age and Viking Age.

== Notable people ==
- Hans Lassen (1926 in Gevninge - 2011) the last Danish Governor of Greenland from 1973 to 1979

== Bibliography ==
- Christensen, Tom (2002). "Kongens Mand — Guld og Hjelm fra Gevninge". In Pind, John; Jørgensen, Anne Nørgård; Jørgensen, Lars; Storgård, Birger; Rindel, Per Ole & Ilkjær, Jørgen (eds.). Drik — og du vil Leve Skønt: Festskrift til Ulla Lund Hansen på 60-årsdagen 18. august 2002. Studies in Archaeology & History (in Danish). Vol. 7. Copenhagen: National Museum of Denmark. pp. 41–45. ISBN 87-89384-90-3.
- Christensen, Tom (2015). Lejre Bag Myten: De Arkæologiske Udgravninger (in Danish). Højbjerg: Jysk Arkæologisk Selskab. ISBN 978-87-88415-96-4.
- Herben, Stephen J. Jr. (December 1935). "Heorot". Publications of the Modern Language Association. L (4). Modern Language Association: 933–945. doi:10.2307/458100. JSTOR 458100.
- Overing, Gillian; Osborn, Marijane (1994). Landscape of Desire: Partial Stories of the Medieval Scandinavian World. Minneapolis: University of Minnesota Press.
- Ulriksen, Jens (2008). "Gevninge – Leddet til Lejre". KUML (in Danish). 57 (57). Højbjerg: Jysk Arkæologisk Selskab: 145–180. doi:10.7146/kuml.v57i57.24659. Archived from the original on 2 October 2017.
