= Herbert Maryon =

English conservator (1874–1965)

Herbert Maryon OBE FSA FIIC
- With his reconstruction of the Sutton Hoo helmet, c. 1951. The image to Maryon's left depicts the helmet from Vendel 14; that on his right shows plate 1 from Greta Arwidsson's 1942 work on Valsgärde 6, and depicts the helmet from that grave.
- Born: 9 March 1874; London, England
- Died: 14 July 1965 (aged 91); Edinburgh, Scotland
- Education: Central School of Arts and Crafts
- Occupations: Sculptor, metalsmith, conservator-restorer
- Relatives: Edith Maryon

Signature
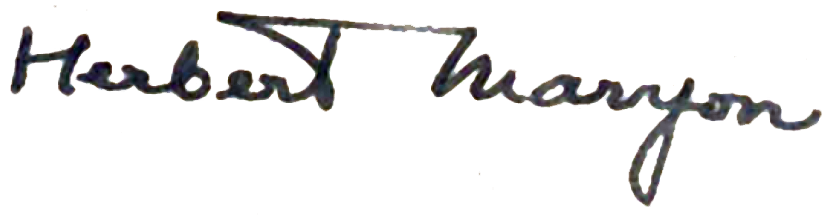

Herbert James Maryon OBE FSA FIIC (9 March 1874 – 14 July 1965) was an English sculptor, conservator, goldsmith, archaeologist and authority on ancient metalwork. Maryon practised and taught sculpture until retiring in 1939, then worked as a conservator with the British Museum from 1944 to 1961. He is best known for his work on the Sutton Hoo ship-burial, which led to his appointment as an Officer of the Order of the British Empire.

By the time of his mid-twenties Maryon had attended three art schools, was an apprentice in silversmithery with C. R. Ashbee, and worked in Henry Wilson's workshop. From 1900 to 1904 he served as the director of the Keswick School of Industrial Art, where he designed numerous Arts and Crafts works. After moving to the University of Reading and then Durham University, he taught sculpture, metalwork, modelling, casting, and anatomy until 1939. He also designed the University of Reading War Memorial, among other commissions. Maryon published two books while teaching, including Metalwork and Enamelling, and many articles. He frequently led archaeological digs, and in 1935 discovered one of the oldest gold ornaments known in Britain whilst excavating the Kirkhaugh cairns.

In 1944 Maryon was brought out of retirement to work on the Sutton Hoo finds. His responsibilities included restoring the shield, the drinking horns, and the iconic Sutton Hoo helmet, which proved academically and culturally influential. Maryon's work, much of which was revised in the 1970s, created credible renderings upon which subsequent research relied; likewise, one of his papers coined the term pattern welding to describe a method employed on the Sutton Hoo sword to decorate and strengthen iron and steel. The initial work ended in 1950, and Maryon turned to other matters. He proposed a widely publicised theory in 1953 on the construction of the Colossus of Rhodes, influencing Salvador Dalí and others, and restored the Roman Emesa helmet in 1955. He left the museum in 1961, a year after his official retirement, and began an around-the-world trip lecturing and researching Chinese magic mirrors.

== Early life and education ==
Herbert James Maryon was born in London on 9 March 1874. He was the third of six surviving children born to John Simeon Maryon, a tailor, and Louisa Maryon (née Church). He had an older brother, John Ernest, and an older sister, Louisa Edith, the latter of whom preceded him in his vocation as a sculptor. Another brother and three sisters were born after him—in order, George Christian, Flora Mabel, Mildred Jessie, and Violet Mary—although Flora Maryon, born in 1878, died in her second year. According to a pedigree compiled by John Ernest Maryon, the Maryons traced back to the de Marinis family, a branch of which left Normandy for England around the 12th century.

After receiving his general education at The Lower School of John Lyon, Herbert Maryon studied from 1896 to 1900 at the Polytechnic (Regent Street), where he received a scholarship and special extension for a third year, as well as at The Slade, Saint Martin's School of Art, and, under the tutelage of Alexander Fisher and William Lethaby, the Central School of Arts and Crafts. He also obtained first class South Kensington certificates in drawing from life, antique, light and shade, and other subjects. Under Fisher in particular, Maryon learned enamelling. Maryon further received a one- or two-year silversmithing apprenticeship around 1898, at C. R. Ashbee's Essex House Guild of Handicrafts, and worked for a period of time in Henry Wilson's workshop. At some point, though perhaps later, Maryon also worked in the workshop of George Frampton, and was taught by Robert Catterson Smith.

== Sculpture ==
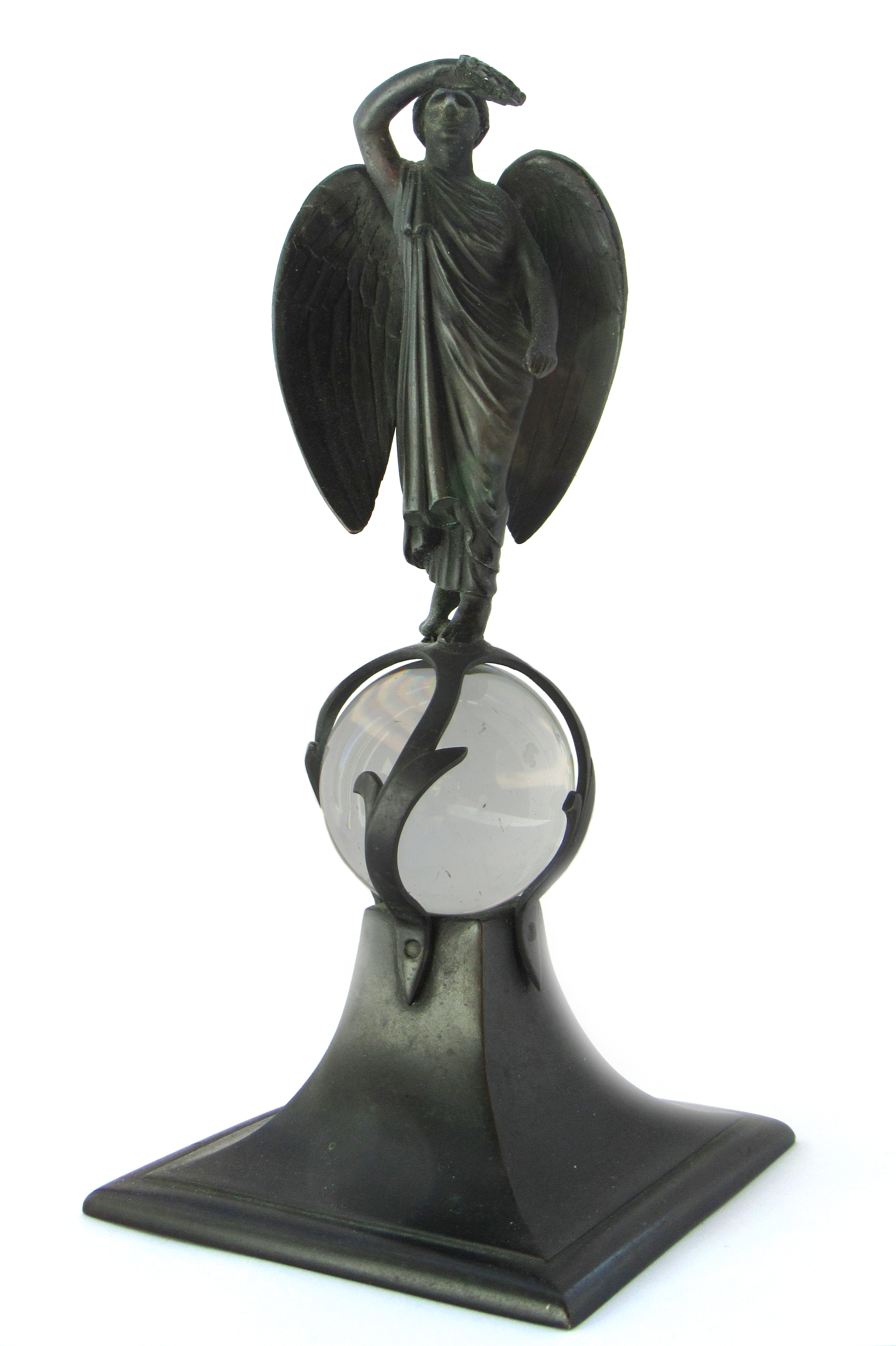
Winged Victory by Herbert Maryon

From 1900 until 1939, Maryon held various positions teaching sculpture, design, and metalwork. During this time, and while still in school beforehand, he created and exhibited many of his own works. At the end of 1899 he displayed a silver cup and a shield of arms with silver cloisonné at the sixth exhibition of the Arts and Crafts Exhibition Society, an event held at the New Gallery which also included a work by his sister Edith. The exhibition was reviewed by The International Studio, with Maryon's work singled out as "agreeable".

=== Keswick School of Industrial Art, 1900–1904 ===
In March 1900 Maryon became the first director of the Keswick School of Industrial Art. The school had been opened by Edith and Hardwicke Rawnsley in 1884, amid the emergence of the Arts and Crafts movement. It offered classes in drawing, design, woodcarving, and metalwork, and melded commercial with artistic purposes; the school sold items such as trays, frames, tables, and clock-cases, and developed a reputation for quality. Already by May a reviewer for The Studio of an exhibition at the Royal Albert Hall commented that a group of silver tableware by the school was "a welcome departure towards finer craftsmanship". Two of Maryon's designs, she wrote, "were singularly good—a knocker, executed by Jeremiah Richardson, and a copper casket made by Thomas Spark and ornamented by Thomas Clark and the designer". (Note: The casket was auctioned in 2005 by Penrith Farmers’ & Kidd’s, with an estimate of £800 to £1,200.) She described the casket's lock as "enamelled in pearly blue and white", and giving "a dainty touch of colour to a form almost bare of ornament, but beautiful in its proportions and lines". At the following year's exhibition three more works by the school were singled out for praise, including a loving cup by Maryon.

Under Maryon's leadership the Keswick School expanded the breadth and range of its designs; at the same time, Maryon executed several significant commissions. His best works, wrote a historian of the school, "drew their inspiration from the nature of the material and his deep understanding of its technical limits". They also tended to be in metal. Items like Bryony, a tray centre showing tangled growth concealed within a geometric framework, continued the school's tradition of repoussé work of naturalistic interpretations of flowers, while evoking the vine-like wallpapers of William Morris. These themes were particularly expressed in a 1901 plaque memorialising Bernard Gilpin, unveiled in St Cuthbert's Church, Kentmere; described by the art historian Sir Nikolaus Pevsner as "Arts and Crafts, almost Art Nouveau", the bronze tablet on oak is framed by trees with entwined roots and influenced by a Norse and Celtic aesthetic. Three other commissions in silver—a loving cup, a processional cross, and a challenge shield—were completed towards the end of Maryon's tenure at the school and featured in The Studio and its international counterpart. The cup was commissioned by the Cumberland County Council for presentation to HMS Cumberland, and was termed a "tour de force".

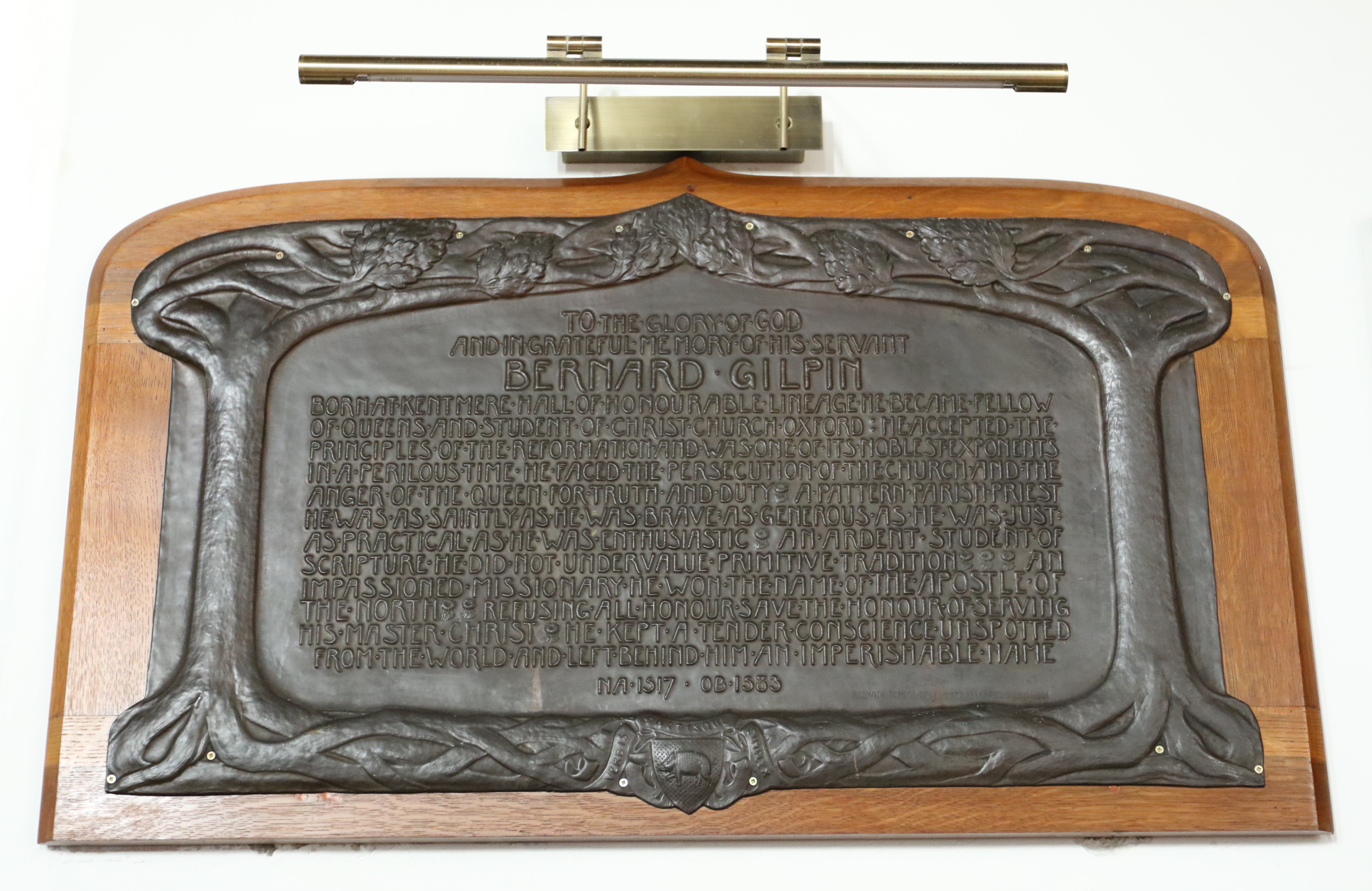
1901 memorial to Bernard Gilpin, designed by Maryon, in St Cuthbert's Church

Particularly in more utilitarian works, Maryon's designs at the Keswick School tended to emphasise form over design. As he would write a decade later, "[o]ver-insistence on technique, craftsmanship which proclaims 'How clever am I!' quite naturally elbows out artistic feeling. One idea must be the principal one; and if that happens to be technique, the other goes." Design should be determined by intention, he wrote: as an artistic objet or a utilitarian object. Hot water jugs, tea pots, sugar bowls and other tableware that Maryon designed were frequently raised from a single sheet of metal, retaining the hammer marks and a dull lustre. Many of these were displayed at the 1902 Home Arts and Industries Exhibition, where the school won 65 awards, along with an altar cross designed by Maryon for Hexham Abbey, and were praised for showing "a remarkably good year's work in the finer kinds of craft and decoration". At the same event a year later more than £35 worth of goods were sold, including a copper jug Maryon designed which was acquired by the Manchester School of Art for its Arts and Crafts Museum. On the strength of these and other achievements, Maryon's salary, which in 1902 had amounted in his estimation to between £185 and £200, was raised to £225.

Maryon's four-year tenure at Keswick was assisted by four designers who also taught drawing: G. M. Collinson, Isobel McBean, Maude M. Ackery, and Dorothea Carpenter. (Note: Among Maryon's students, meanwhile, was W. Edward Parkinson (son of C. Northcote Parkinson), who went on to lead the York School of Arts and Crafts.) Hired from leading art schools and serving for a year each, the four helped the school keep abreast of modern design. Eight full-time workers helped execute the designs when Maryon joined in 1900, rising to 15 by 1903. Maryon also had the help of his sisters: Edith Maryon designed at least one work for the school, a 1901 relief plaque of Hardwicke Rawnsley, while Mildred Maryon, who the 1901 census listed as living with her sister, worked for a time as an enameller at the school. Both Herbert and Mildred Maryon worked on an oxidised silver and enamel casket that was presented to Princess Louise upon her 1902 visit to the Keswick School; Herbert Maryon was responsible for the design and his sister for the enamelling, with the resulting work being termed "of a character highly creditable to the School" in The Magazine of Art. Strife with colleagues eventually led to Maryon's departure. In July 1901 Collinson had left due to a poor working relationship, and Maryon was often in conflict with the school's management committee, which was chaired by Edith Rawnsley and frequently made decisions without his knowledge. When in August 1904 Carpenter, in friction with Maryon, resigned, the committee decided to give Maryon three-months' notice. (Note: It was reported, however, as a resignation.)

Maryon left the school at the end of December 1904. He spent 1905 teaching metalwork at the Storey Institute in Lancaster. That October he published his first article, "Early Irish Metal Work" in The Art Workers' Quarterly. In 1906 Maryon, still listed as living in Keswick, again displayed works—this time a silver cup and silver chalice—for the Arts and Crafts Exhibition Society, held at the Grafton Galleries; one Mrs. Herbert J. Maryon was listed as exhibiting a Sicilian lace tablecloth. At some point towards 1908, Maryon also gave instruction in crafts under the Westmorland County Council.

=== University of Reading, 1908–1927 ===
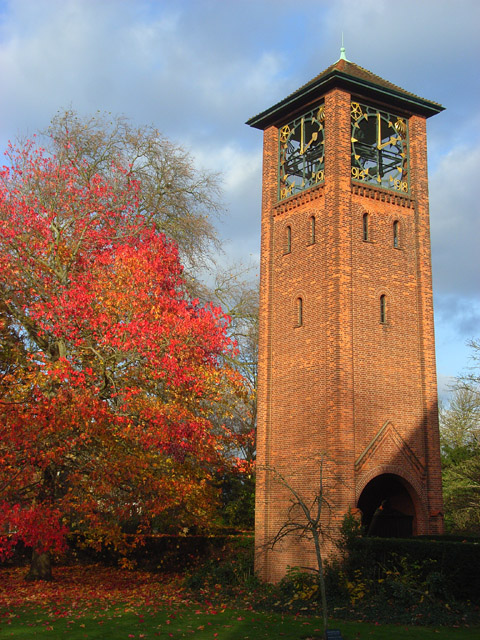
The University of Reading War Memorial, designed by Maryon and dedicated in 1924

In January 1908, Maryon was appointed teacher of crafts are the University of Reading, effective 10 February; he took over from Julia Bowley (wife of Arthur Lyon Bowley), who resigned as teacher of woodcarving and handicraft. Until 1927, Maryon taught sculpture, including metalwork, modelling, and casting, at the school. He was elected an associate of the college honoris causa in 1912, and was the warden of Wantage Hall from 1920 to 1922. His students included Nell Gwenllian Dickson from 1910 to 1914, and Gilbert Adams (son of Marcus Adams and grandson of Walton Adams) from 1923 to 1927.

Maryon's first book, Metalwork and Enamelling: A Practical Treatise on Gold and Silversmiths' Work and their Allied Crafts, was published in 1912. Maryon described it as eschewing "the artistic or historical point of view", in favour of an "essentially practical and technical standpoint". The book focused on individual techniques such as soldering, enamelling, and stone-setting, rather than the methods of creating works such as cups and brooches. It was well received, as a vade mecum for both students and practitioners of metalworking. The Burlington Magazine for Connoisseurs wrote that Maryon "succeeds in every page in not only maintaining his own enthusiasm, but what is better in communicating it", and The Athenæum declared that his "critical notes on design are excellent". One such note, republished in The Jewelers' Circular in 1922, was a critique of the celebrated sixteenth-century goldsmith Benvenuto Cellini; Maryon termed him "one of the very greatest craftsmen of the sixteenth century, but ... a very poor artist", a "dispassionate appraisal" that led a one-time secretary of the Metropolitan Museum of Art to label Maryon not only "the dean of ancient metalwork", but also "a discerning critic". Metalwork and Enamelling went through four further editions, in 1923, 1954, 1959, and posthumously in 1971, along with a 1998 Italian translation, and as of 2020 is still in print by Dover Publications. As late as 1993, a senior conservator at the Canadian Conservation Institute wrote that the book "has not been equalled".

During the First World War Maryon worked at Reading with another instructor, Charles Albert Sadler, to create a centre to train munition workers in machine tool work. Maryon began this work in 1915, officially as organising secretary and instructor at the Ministry of Munitions Training Centre, with no engineering school to build from. The programme targeted women in particular, given the number of men who were serving in the military. By 1918 the centre had five staff members, could accommodate 25 workers at a time, and had trained more than 400. Based on this work, Maryon was elected to the Institution of Mechanical Engineers on 6 March 1918.

Maryon displayed a child's bowl with signs of the zodiac at the ninth Arts and Crafts Exhibition Society exhibition in 1910. Following the war, he—like his colleague and friend William Collingwood—designed several memorials, including the East Knoyle War Memorial in 1920, the Mortimer War Memorial in 1921, and in 1924 the University of Reading War Memorial, a clock tower on the London Road Campus. (Note: in April 1923, Maryon also read the paper "The Place of Sculpture in Relation to Architecture" at a meeting of the Reading Society of Architects.)

=== Armstrong College, 1927–1939 ===
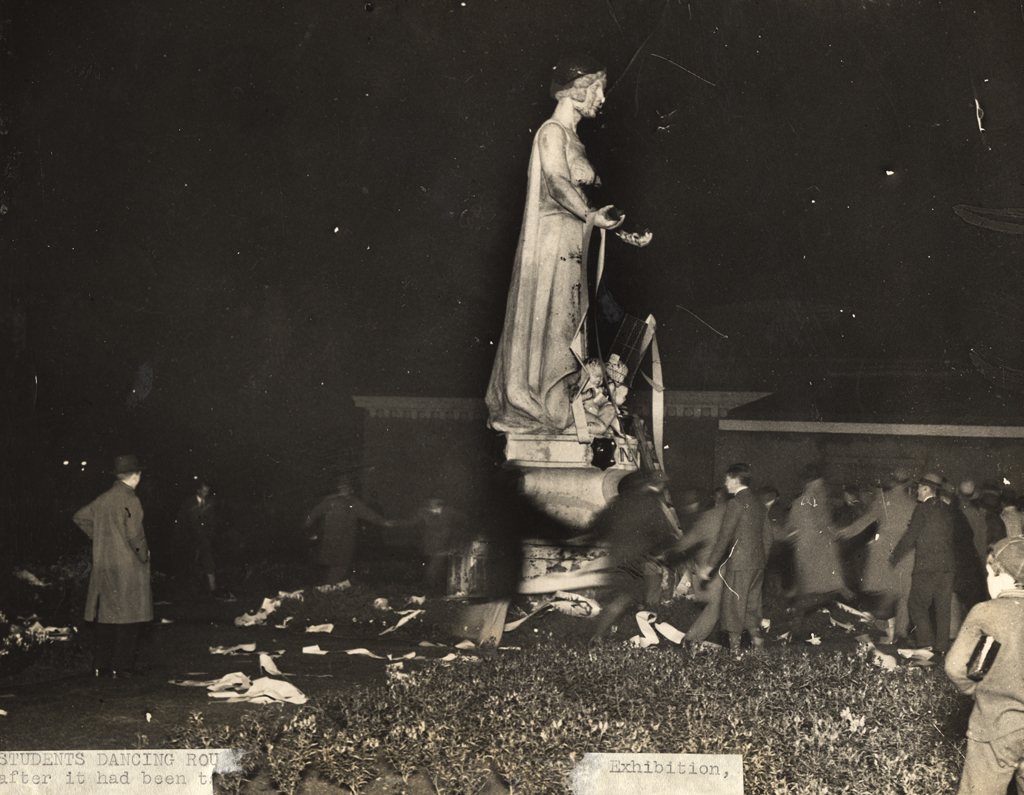
Students dancing around Statue of Industry after tarring and feathering it

In September 1927 Maryon left the University of Reading and began teaching sculpture at Armstrong College, then part of Durham University, where he stayed until 1939. At Durham he was both master of sculpture, and lecturer in anatomy and the history of sculpture. His students included Sidney Spedding (from 1932 to 1936). In 1928 he was also elected president of the college's Arts and Crafts Society. Around 1928, Maryon travelled around Europe, from Reading to Denmark, followed by Copenhagen, Gothenburg, Stockholm, Danzig, Warsaw, Vienna, Dresden, Leipzig, Berlin, Hamburg, and elsewhere, returning to lecture on the sculpture observed on the trip.

In 1933, Maryon published his second book, Modern Sculpture: Its Methods and Ideals. Maryon wrote that his aim was to discuss modern sculpture "from the point of view of the sculptors themselves", rather than from an "archaeological or biographical" perspective. The book received mixed reviews. To The Art Digest, Maryon "succeeded in trying to make sculpture intelligible to the layman". But his treatment of criticism as secondary to intent meant grouping together artworks of unequal quality. Some critics attacked his taste, with The New Statesman and Nation claiming that "[h]e can enjoy almost anything, and among his 350 odd illustrations there are certainly some camels to swallow," The Bookman that "All the bad sculptors ... will be found in Mr. Maryon's book ... Most of the good sculptors are here as well (even Henry Moore), but all are equal in Mr. Maryon's eye," and The Spectator that "[t]he few good works which have found their way into the 356 plates look lost and unhappy." Maryon responded with explanations of his purpose, saying that "I do not admire all the results, and I say so," and to one review in particular that "I believe that the sculptors of the world have a wider knowledge of what constitutes sculpture than your reviewer realizes." Other reviews praised Maryon's academic approach. The Times stated that "his book is remarkable for its extraordinary catholicity, admitting works which we should find it hard to defend ... with works of great merit," yet added that "[b]y a system of grouping, however, according to some primarily aesthetic aim ... their inclusion is justified." The Manchester Guardian praised Maryon for "a degree of natural good sense in his observations that cannot always be said to characterise current art criticism", and stated that "his critical judgments are often penetrating."

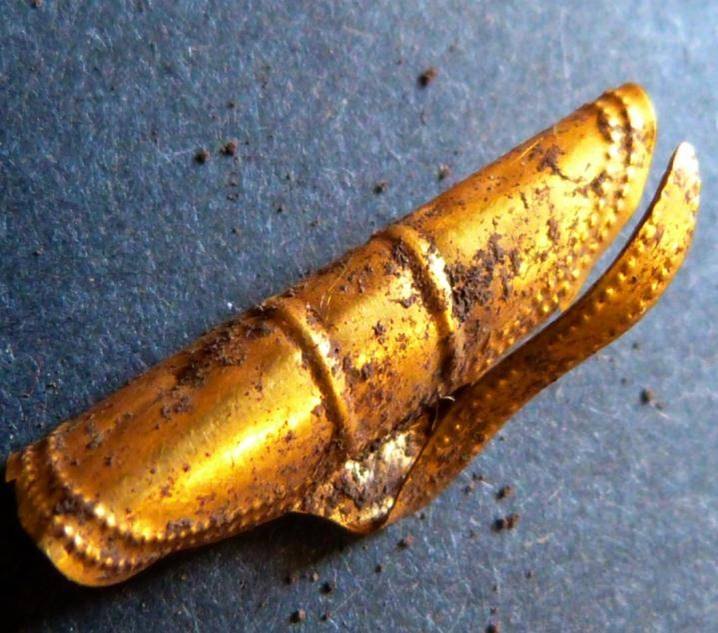
One of two gold ornaments from the Kirkhaugh cairns, matching the one excavated by Maryon in 1935

At Durham, as at Reading, Maryon was commissioned to create works of art. These included at least two plaques, memorialising George Stephenson in 1929, and Sir Charles Parsons in 1932, (Note: The Parsons plaque was placed on display at C. A. Parsons and Company. Sometime after 2003 the building was demolished and the plaque was donated to the Discovery Museum, where as of 2016 there were plans to place it on display.) as well as Statue of Industry for the 1929 North East Coast Exhibition, a world's fair held at Newcastle upon Tyne. Depicting a woman with cherubs at her feet, the statue was described by Maryon as "represent[ing] industry as we know it in the North-east—one who has passed through hard times and is now ready to face the future, strong and undismayed". The statue was the subject of "adverse criticism", reported The Manchester Guardian; on the night of 25 October "several hundred students of Armstrong College" tarred and feathered the statue, and were dispersed only with the arrival of eighty police officers. (Note: The Manchester Guardian did not explain the reason for the tarring and feathering. It followed on the heels of the tarring and feathering of Jacob Epstein's sculptures Rima on 9 October, and Night on 14 October. In the case of Rima, which was unveiled around 1926 and shortly thereafter covered in green paint, papers reported that it had come under criticism for its "'expressionistic' character". Then in 1928 Peter Pan, a statue by Maryon's late teacher Sir George Frampton, was itself tarred and feathered.)

1937 oil painting of Maryon by his student Wylliann Weatherall, later known as Ann Dallas (Note: Weatherall studied under Maryon at Armstrong College, graduating in 1929 or 1930. Her painting was exhibited at the Thirtieth Annual Exhibition of Works by Artists of the Northern Counties at the Laing Art Gallery and Museum, with The Newcastle Journal terming it "a very good likeness" of Maryon.)

Maryon expressed an interest in archaeology while at Armstrong. By the early 1930s he was conducting excavations, and frequently brought students to dig along Hadrian's Wall. In 1935 he published two articles on Bronze Age swords, and at the end of the year excavated the Kirkhaugh cairns, two Bronze Age graves at Kirkhaugh, Northumberland. One of the cairns was the nearly 4500-year-old grave of a metalworker, like the grave of the Amesbury Archer, and contained one of the oldest gold ornaments yet found in the United Kingdom; a matching ornament was found during a re-excavation in 2014. Maryon's account of the excavation was published in 1936.

Throughout the late 1930s, Maryon continued to write papers on archaeology and prehistoric metalworking. In 1937 he published an article in Antiquity clarifying a passage by the ancient Greek historian Diodorus Siculus on how Egyptians carved sculptures, and gave a lecture on "Artistic Adventures on the N.W. Frontier". The following year he wrote in both the Proceedings of the Royal Irish Academy and The Antiquaries Journal on metalworking during the Bronze and Iron Ages, and in 1939 he wrote articles about an ancient hand-anvil discovered in Thomastown, and gold ornaments found in Alnwick.

Maryon retired from Armstrong College—by then known as King's College—in 1939, when he was in his mid-60s. From 1939 to 1943, at the height of World War II, he was involved in munition work. In 1941 he published a two-part article in Man on archaeology and metallurgy, part I on welding and soldering, and part II on the metallurgy of gold and platinum in Pre-Columbian Ecuador.

== British Museum, 1944–1961 ==
On 11 November 1944 Maryon was recruited out of retirement by the trustees of the British Museum to serve as a Technical Attaché. Maryon, working under Harold Plenderleith's leadership, was tasked with the conservation and reconstruction of material from the Anglo-Saxon Sutton Hoo ship-burial. Widely identified with King Rædwald of East Anglia, the burial had previously attracted Maryon's interest; as early as 1941, he wrote a prescient letter about the preservation of the ship impression to Thomas Downing Kendrick, the museum's Keeper of British and Medieval Antiquities. (Note: Kendrick would become director of the museum in 1950. Dated 6 January 1941, Maryon's letter read: "There is a question about the Sutton Hoo ship which has been rather on my mind. There exist many photographs of the ship, taken from many angles, and they provide much information as to its structure and general appearance. But has anything been done to preserve the actual form of the vessel—full size? The Viking ships in their museum in Scandinavia are most impressive, for they are surviving representatives of the actual vessels which played so great a part in the early history of Western Europe. The Sutton Hoo ship is our only representative in this class. I believe that all the timbers have perished, but the form remains—traced in the earth. That form could be preserved in a plaster cast. I have given some thought to the making of large casts for I have done figures up to 18 feet in height. The work could be done in the following manner: a light steel girder would be constructed, running the full length of the ship, but built in quite short sections. This would not rise above the level of the gunwale at any point but would follow the general curve of the central section of the vessel. It would extend right down to the keel, and would support all the lateral frames. The outer skin, which would preserve the actual external form of the vessel, would be of the usual canvas and plaster work. It would be cast in sections, each perhaps extending along five feet of the length and from keel to gunwale on one side. All sections would be assembled by bolting the frames together. Any roughness of surface due to accidental irregularities in the existing earth matrix could be removed. If it were desired to illustrate the inner structure of the vessel also, I think that that might be shown by constructing a wooden model on a reduced scale. Such a cast as that suggested above would be a very important document for the history of the time and it would provide a valuable introduction to Sutton Hoo's splendid array of furnishings." Such an operation was not carried out at the time, largely due to time constraints imposed by World War II—impending during the original 1939 excavation, and in full swing by the time of Maryon's letter. When an impression was taken during the 1965–69 Sutton Hoo excavations, much the same methods that Maryon proposed were adopted.) Nearly four years after his letter, in the dying days of World War II and the finds removed (or about to be removed) from safekeeping in the tunnel connecting the Aldwych and Holborn tube stations, he was assigned what Rupert Bruce-Mitford, who succeeded Kendrick's post in 1954, termed "the real headaches—notably the crushed shield, helmet and drinking horns". Composed in large part of iron, wood and horn, these items had decayed in the 1,300 years since their burial and left only fragments behind; the helmet, for one, had corroded and then smashed into more than 500 pieces. Painstaking work needing keen observation and patience, these efforts occupied several years of Maryon's career. Much of his work has seen revision, but as Bruce-Mitford wrote afterwards, "by carrying out the initial cleaning, sorting, and mounting of the mass of the fragmentary and fragile material he preserved it, and in working out his reconstructions he made explicit the problems posed and laid the foundations upon which fresh appraisals and progress could be based when fuller archaeological study became possible."

Maryon's restorations were aided by his deep practical understandings of the objects on which he worked. A senior conservator at the Canadian Conservation Institute thus wrote in 1993 that Maryon was "[o]ne of the finest exemplars" of a conservator whose "wide understanding of the structure and function of museum objects ... exceeds that gained by the curator or historian in more classical studies of artefacts." Maryon was admitted as a fellow of the Society of Antiquaries in 1949, and in 1956 his Sutton Hoo work led to his appointment as an Officer of the Order of the British Empire. Asked by Queen Elizabeth II what he did as she awarded him the medal, Maryon responded "Well, Ma'am, I am a sort of back room boy at the British Museum." Maryon continued restoration work at the British Museum, including on Oriental antiquities and the Roman Emesa helmet, before retiring—for a second time—at the age of 87.

=== Sutton Hoo helmet ===
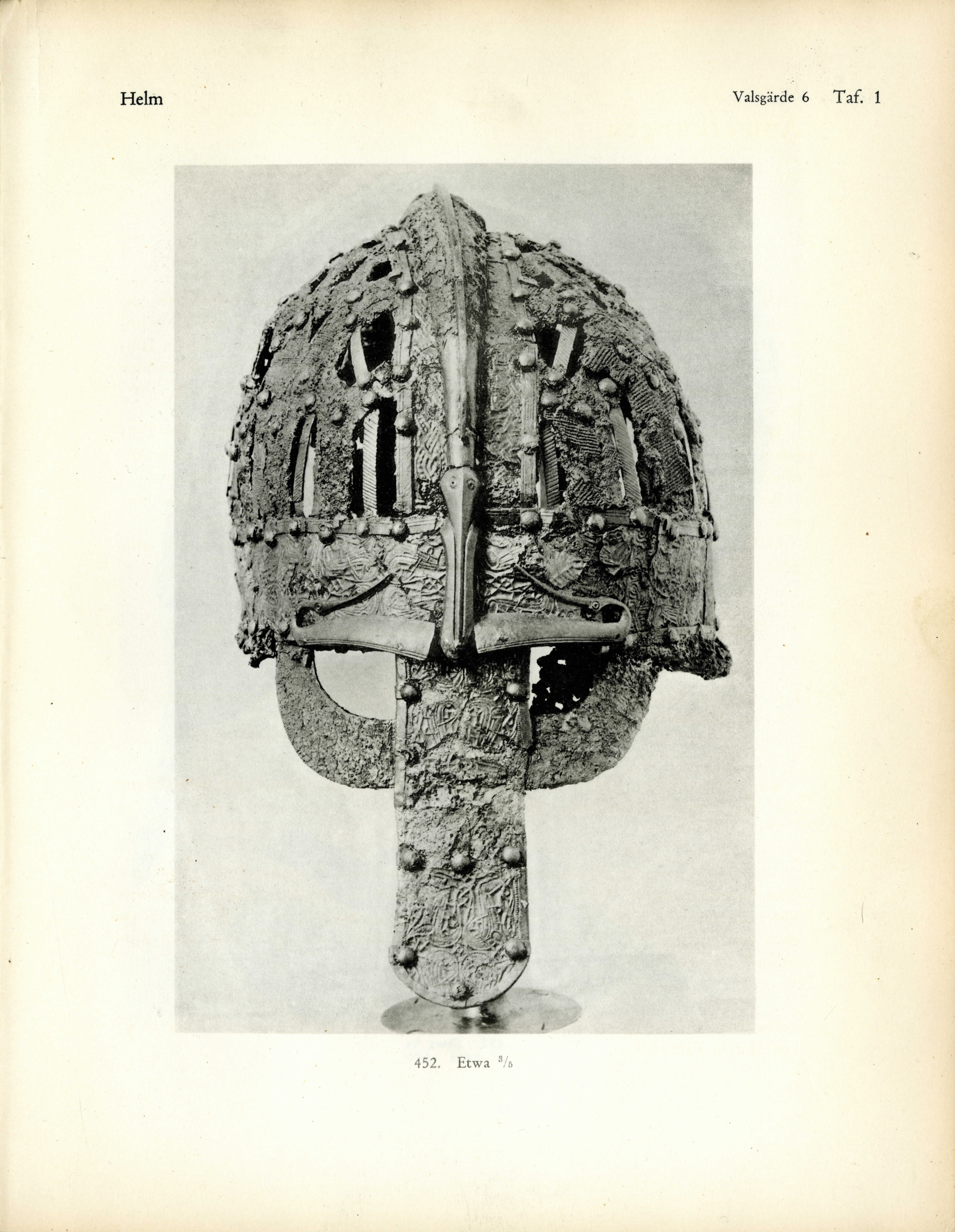
The Valsgärde 6 helmet was one of the few published exemplar helmets at the time of Maryon's reconstruction.

From 1945 to 1946, Maryon spent six continuous months reconstructing the Sutton Hoo helmet. The helmet was only the second Anglo-Saxon example then known, the Benty Grange helmet being the first, and was the most elaborate. Yet its importance had not been realized during excavation, and no photographs of it were taken in situ. Bruce-Mitford likened Maryon's task to "a jigsaw puzzle without any sort of picture on the lid of the box", and, "as it proved, a great many of the pieces missing"; Maryon had to base his reconstruction "exclusively on the information provided by the surviving fragments, guided by archaeological knowledge of other helmets". (Note: By contrast, photographs of the shield fragments suggested their spatial relationships, allowing Plenderleith to determine which pieces were part of the grip.)

Maryon began the reconstruction by familiarising himself with the fragments, tracing and detailing each on a piece of card. After what he termed "a long while", he sculpted a head out of plaster and expanded it outwards to simulate the padded space between helmet and head. On this he initially affixed the fragments with plasticine, placing thicker pieces into spaces cut into the head. Finally, the fragments were permanently affixed with white plaster mixed with brown umber; more plaster was used to fill the in-between areas. The fragments of the cheek guards, neck guard, and visor were placed onto shaped, plaster-covered wire mesh, then affixed with more plaster and joined to the cap. Maryon published the finished reconstruction in a 1947 issue of Antiquity.

Maryon's work was celebrated, and both academically and culturally influential. The helmet stayed on display for over twenty years, with photographs making their way into television programmes, newspapers, and "every book on Anglo-Saxon art and archaeology"; in 1951 a young Larry Burrows was dispatched to the British Museum by Life, which published a full page photograph of the helmet alongside a photo of Maryon. Over the succeeding quarter century conservation techniques advanced, knowledge of contemporaneous helmets grew, and more helmet fragments were discovered during the 1965–1969 re-excavation of Sutton Hoo; accordingly, inaccuracies in Maryon's reconstruction—notably its diminished size, gaps in afforded protection, and lack of a moveable neck guard—became apparent. (Note: Bruce-Mitford suggested that Maryon's reconstruction "was soon criticized, though not in print, by Swedish scholars and others". At least one scholar, however, did publish minor criticisms. In a 1948 article by Sune Lindqvist—translated into English by Bruce-Mitford himself—the Swedish professor wrote that "[t]he reconstruction of the Sutton Hoo helmet ... needs revision in certain respects." Nonetheless, his only specific criticism was that the face-mask was "set somewhat awry in the reconstruction".) In 1971 a second reconstruction was completed, following eighteen months' work by Nigel Williams. Yet "[m]uch of Maryon's work is valid," Bruce-Mitford wrote. "The general character of the helmet was made plain." (Note: Maryon's reconstruction correctly identified both the five designs depicted on its exterior, and the helmet's method of construction. Maryon wrote that the helmet was made of sheet iron, then "covered with sheets of very thin tinned bronze, stamped with patterns, and arranged in panels". The patterns were formed from dies carved in relief, while the panels were "framed by lengths of moulding ... swaged from strips of tin", themselves "fixed in place by bronze rivets", and gilded. Meanwhile, "the free edges of the helmet were protected by a U-shaped channel of gilt bronze, clamped on, and held in position by narrow gilt bronze ties, riveted on." Although likely not more than educated guesses, Maryon's statements were largely confirmed by scientific analysis carried out after completion of the second reconstruction. The nature of the moulding separating the panels, however, remains unclear. Maryon suggested they were swaged from tin and gilded, while Bruce-Mitford suggested they were made of bronze. The later analysis found results which were perhaps contradictory, yet themselves internally contradictory. A subsurface sample of the moulding "suggest[ed] that the original metal was tin", (Maryon's theory) while a surface sample showed an "ε-copper/tin compound (Cu3Sn)" and thus suggested instead, because of a similar process observed on the shield, "that the surface of a bronze alloy containing at least 62% of copper had been coated with tin and heated". Additionally, a surface sample taken near the crest had a trace of mercury, suggestive of a fire-gilding process that requires a temperature at least 128 °C above the melting point of tin. An alloy containing at least 20% copper would thus be needed to sufficiently raise the melting point of the tin during the gilding process, a reality further inconsistent with the results of the subsurface sample of moulding. As to swageing, "if the strips [of moulding] were of high tin alloy throughout, swageing would be impossible as copper/tin alloys containing more than 20% of tin are very brittle," while an alloy containing less than 25% tin would no longer replicate the white colour of the helmet. Although the subsurface sample supports Maryon's theory of swaged tin—though not of universally gilded mouldings, which as reflected in the 1973 replica helmet were only found next to the crest—it contradicts the theory suggested by the surface sample, i.e., a copper alloy with a high tin content that was not swaged.) "It was only because there was a first restoration that could be constructively criticized," noted the conservation scholar Chris Caple, "that there was the impetus and improved ideas available for a second restoration;" similarly, minor errors in the second reconstruction were discovered while forging the 1973 Royal Armouries replica. In executing a first reconstruction that was reversible and retained evidence by being only lightly cleaned, Maryon's true contribution to the Sutton Hoo helmet was in creating a credible first rendering that allowed for the critical examination leading to the second, current, reconstruction.

=== After Sutton Hoo ===
A paper read by Maryon in December 1953 likely influenced Salvador Dalí's 1954 rendering of the Colossus. Dalí's work incorporates Maryon's proposal of 1) a tripod structure balanced by hanging drapery, 2) a pose in which Helios shades his eyes, and most significantly 3) a statue composed of many hammered bronze plates.

Maryon finished reconstructions of significant objects from Sutton Hoo by 1946, although work on the remaining finds carried him to 1950; at this point Plenderleith decided the work had been finished to the extent possible, and that the space in the research laboratory was needed for other purposes. Maryon continued working at the museum until 1961, turning his attention to other matters. This included some travel: in April 1954 he visited Toronto, giving lectures at the Royal Ontario Museum on Sutton Hoo before a large audience, and another on "Founders and Metal Workers of the Early World"; the same year he visited Philadelphia, where he was scheduled to appear on an episode of What in the World? before the artefacts were mistakenly carted away to the dump; (Note: What in the World? was a show where a panel of scholar–contestants would examine, and attempt to identify, artefacts from the collection of the University of Pennsylvania Museum of Archaeology and Anthropology. Froelich Rainey was the moderator, and for the 3 April 1954 show Maryon was scheduled to be the guest panelist alongside Alfred Kidder II and Schuyler Cammann, both of the museum. The objects set aside for their show included a bronze spearhead from the Middle East dating to 2,400 BC, an African sculpture, a bronze antelope from North India, a bronze medallion from Switzerland dating to 400 BC, a wood carving from Bali, and the handle of an adze used by Native Americans on the Columbia River in Washington. The objects were kept in a cardboard box and mistaken for garbage by a substitute cleaning crew on Friday night, then picked up in the morning by a dump truck operated by Edward Heller and his 16-year-old son Richard. When the box was discovered as missing the studio was searched, the police were called (under the assumption it had been stolen), and Edward Heller was contacted; "I was almost certain," Rainey later said, that the box had been mistakenly included with a shipment to another museum. Richard Heller drove to the dump, despite his father's advice that even if he found the correct spot, the box would have been consumed by a dump fire. Finding the box just as it ignited, Richard Heller doused the fire and recovered the items undamaged. "I looked the things over after Dick brought them back", his father said. "They still looked like to junk [sic] to me." The objects were not recovered in time for the 1:30 show, however, so a kinescope rerun was aired instead.) and in 1957 or 1958, paid a visit to the Gennadeion at the American School of Classical Studies at Athens.

In 1955 Maryon restored the Roman Emesa helmet for the British Museum. It had been found in the Syrian city Homs in 1936, and underwent several failed restoration attempts before it was brought to the museum—"the last resort in these things", according to Maryon. The restoration was published the following year by Plenderleith. Around that time Maryon and Plenderleith also collaborated on several other works: in 1954 they wrote a chapter on metalwork for the History of Technology series, and in 1959 they co-authored a paper on the cleaning of Westminster Abbey's bronze royal effigies.

== Publications ==
In addition to Metalwork and Enamelling and Modern Sculpture, Maryon authored chapters in volumes one and two of Charles Singer's "A History of Technology" series, and wrote thirty or forty archaeological and technical papers. Several of Maryon's earlier papers, in 1946 and 1947, described his restorations of the shield and helmet from the Sutton Hoo burial. In 1948 another paper introduced the term pattern welding to describe a method of strengthening and decorating iron and steel by welding into them twisted strips of metal; the method was employed on the Sutton Hoo sword among others, giving them a distinctive pattern.

During 1953 and 1954, his talk and paper on the Colossus of Rhodes received international attention for suggesting the statue was hollow, and stood aside rather than astride the harbour. (Note: Newspaper articles published in the United Kingdom, Canada, and the United States reference an account read to the Society of Antiquaries of London on 3 December 1953. Maryon published the paper, entitled "The Colossus of Rhodes", in The Journal of Hellenic Studies in 1956.) Made of hammered bronze plates less than a sixteenth of an inch thick, he suggested, it would have been supported by a tripod structure comprising the two legs and a hanging piece of drapery. Although "great ideas" according to the scholar Godefroid de Callataÿ, neither fully caught on; in 1957, Denys Haynes, then the Keeper of Greek and Roman Antiquities at the British Museum, suggested that Maryon's theory of hammered bronze plates relied on an errant translation of a primary source. (Note: Maryon used Johann Caspar von Orelli's translation of Philo of Byzantium, which Haynes argued "is frequently misleading". Using Rudolf Hercher's translation, Haynes suggested that "Έπιχωνεύειν is a key word for the whole of Philo's description. An unfortunate slip in the translation used by Maryon confuses it with ἐπιχωννύειν 'to fill up' and so destroys the sense of the passage. Έπιχωνεύειν means 'to cast upon' the part already cast, and that implies casting in situ. It is contrasted with ἐπιθεῖναι 'to place upon', which would imply that the casting was done at a distance. Since in 'casting upon' the molten metal which was to form the new part would presumably have come into direct contact with the existing part, fusion (i.e. 'casting on' in the technical sense) would probably have resulted." Yet the amount of bronze Philo claimed the Colossus to have been made from—500 talents—would not be enough for a statue that was cast, leading Haynes to argue that the figure had been corrupted. Haynes thus effectively conceded that if the 500-talent figure was correct, Maryon had a point.) Maryon's view was nevertheless influential, likely shaping Salvador Dalí's 1954 surrealist imagining of the statue, The Colossus of Rhodes. "Not only the pose," wrote de Callataÿ, "but even the hammered plates of Maryon's theory find [in Dalí's painting] a clear and very powerful expression."

== Later years ==
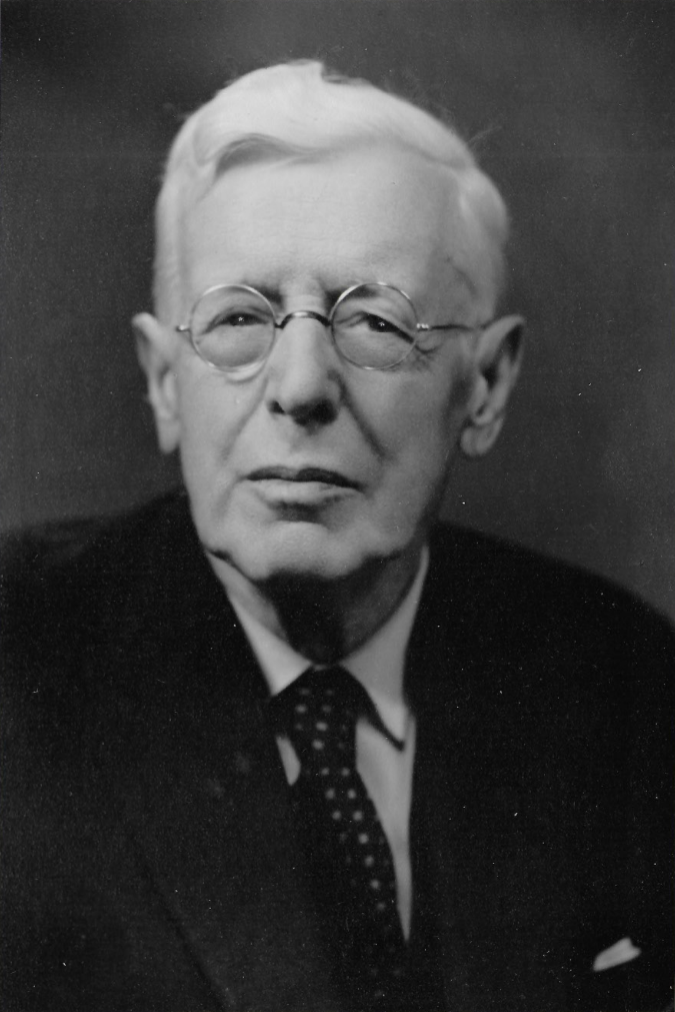
Maryon, c. 1950s or 1960s

Maryon finally left the British Museum in 1961, a year after his official retirement. He donated a number of items to the museum, including plaster maquettes by George Frampton of Comedy and Tragedy, used for the memorial to Sir W. S. Gilbert along the Victoria Embankment. Before his departure Maryon had been planning a trip around the world, and at the end of 1961 he left for Fremantle, Australia, arriving on 1 January 1962. In Perth he visited his brother George Maryon, whom he had not seen in 60 years. From Australia Maryon departed for Vancouver, then entered the United States through Seattle; he arrived in San Francisco on 15 February. Much of Maryon's North American tour was done with buses and cheap hotels, for, as a colleague would recall, Maryon "liked to travel the hard way—like an undergraduate—which was to be expected since, at 89, he was a young man."

Maryon devoted much of his time during the American stage of his trip to visiting museums and the study of Chinese magic mirrors, a subject he had turned to some two years before. From February through March, stops included Los Angeles, Salt Lake City, the Grand Canyon, and Chicago; by the time he reached Kansas City, Missouri, where he was written up in The Kansas City Times, he had listed 526 examples in his notebook. Maryon arrived in Cleveland from Detroit on 2 April—where he spent three full days at the Cleveland Museum of Art and was again written up by local papers, The Plain Dealer and the Cleveland Press—and then departed by Greyhound to Pittsburgh on 6 April.

Maryon's trip also included guest lectures, such as his talk "Metal Working in the Ancient World" at the Museum of Fine Arts, Boston on 1 May 1962 and the Massachusetts Institute of Technology the day after, and when he came to New York City a colleague later said that "he wore out several much younger colleagues with an unusually long stint devoted to a meticulous examination of two large collections of pre-Columbian fine metalwork, a field that was new to him." Maryon scheduled the trip to end in Toronto, where his son John Maryon, a civil engineer, lived.

== Personal life ==
In July 1903 Maryon married Annie Elizabeth Maryon (née Stones). They had a daughter, Kathleen Rotha Maryon, born on 19 December 1905; she married a John George Darley on 8 July 1929. Annie Maryon died on 8 February 1908. A second marriage, to Muriel Dore Wood in September 1920, produced two children, son John and daughter Margaret; their daughter married George Scott Bowman in 1949.

Maryon lived the majority of his life in London, and died on 14 July 1965, at a nursing home in Edinburgh, in his 92nd year. Death notices were published in papers including The Daily Telegraph, The Times, the Toronto Daily Star, the Montreal Star, the Brandon Sun, and the Ottawa Journal. Longer obituaries followed in Studies in Conservation, and the American Journal of Archaeology,

== Works by Maryon ==
=== Books ===
- Maryon, Herbert (1912). Metalwork and Enamelling. London: Chapman & Hall.
- Maryon, Herbert (1923). Metalwork and Enamelling (2nd ed.). London: Chapman & Hall.
- Maryon, Herbert (1954). Metalwork and Enamelling (3rd ed.). London: Chapman & Hall.
- Maryon, Herbert (1959). Metalwork and Enamelling (4th ed.). London: Chapman & Hall.
- Maryon, Herbert (1971). Metalwork and Enamelling (5th ed.). New York: Dover. ISBN 978-0-486-22702-3.
- Maryon, Herbert (1998). La Lavorazione dei Metalli. Translated by Cesari, Mario. Milan: Hoepli.
- Maryon, Herbert (1933a). Modern Sculpture: Its Methods and Ideals. London: Sir Isaac Pitman & Sons.
- Maryon, Herbert & Plenderleith, H. J. (1954). "Fine Metal-Work". In Singer, Charles; Holmyard, E. J. & Hall, A. R. (eds.). A History of Technology: From Early Times to Fall of Ancient Empires. A History of Technology. Vol. 1. London: Oxford University Press. pp. 623–662.
- Maryon, Herbert (1956a). "Fine Metal-Work". In Singer, Charles; Holmyard, E. J.; Hall, A. R. & Williams, Trevor I. (eds.). A History of Technology: The Mediterranean Civilizations and the Middle Ages. A History of Technology. Vol. 2. Oxford: Clarendon Press. pp. 449–484.

=== Articles ===
- Maryon, Herbert (October 1905). "Early Irish Metal Work". The Art Workers' Quarterly. IV (16): 177–180. OCLC 445017.
- Maryon, Herbert (December 1905). "Metal Work: I.—Raising—A Chalice Cup". Arts & Crafts. IV (19). London: Hutchinson & Co.: 45–48. OCLC 225804755.
- Maryon, Herbert (January 1906). "Metal Work: II.—Mouldings". Arts & Crafts. IV (20). London: Hutchinson & Co.: 70–74. OCLC 225804755.
- Maryon, Herbert (February 1906). "Metal Work: III.—Methods of Soldering: Ancient and Modern". Arts & Crafts. IV (21). London: Hutchinson & Co.: 121–126. OCLC 225804755.
- Maryon, Herbert (March 1906). "Metal Work: IV.—Filigree". Arts & Crafts. IV (22). London: Hutchinson & Co.: 185–188. OCLC 225804755.
- Maryon, Herbert (April 1906). "Metal Work: V.—Repoussé". Arts & Crafts. IV (23). London: Hutchinson & Co.: 237–240. OCLC 225804755.
- Maryon, Herbert & Sadler, Charles A. (3 August 1916). "Repetition Work on Small Lathes". The Model Engineer and Electrician. XXXV (797): 68–70.
- Maryon, Herbert (10 May 1922a). "Design in Jewelry". The Jewelers' Circular. LXXXIV (15): 97.
  - Republication of passages from Maryon 1912, pp. 280–281
- Maryon, Herbert (12 July 1922b). "A Critique on Cellini". The Jewelers' Circular. LXXXIV (24): 89.
  - Republication of Maryon 1912, ch. XXXIII
- Cowen, J. D. & Maryon, Herbert (1935). "The Whittingham Sword" (PDF). Archaeologia Aeliana. 4th ser. XII: 280–309, pl. XXVI–XXVII. ISSN 0261-3417.
- Maryon, Herbert (1935). "The "Casting-On" of a Sword Hilt in the Bronze Age". Proceedings of the Society of Antiquaries of Newcastle Upon Tyne. 4. VI: 41–42.
- Maryon, Herbert (February 1936a). "Granular Work of the Ancient Goldsmiths". Goldsmiths Journal: 554–556. OCLC 4711137.
- Maryon, Herbert (April 1936b). "Solders Used by the Ancient Goldsmiths". Goldsmiths Journal: 72–73. OCLC 4711137.
- Maryon, Herbert (June 1936c). "Jewellery of 5,000 Years Ago". Goldsmiths Journal: 344–345. OCLC 4711137.
- Maryon, Herbert (October 1936d). "Soldering and Welding in the Bronze and Early Iron Ages". Technical Studies in the Field of the Fine Arts. V (2): 75–108. ISSN 0096-9346.
  - Abstract published as Maryon, Herbert (June 1937). "Prehistoric Soldering and Welding". Antiquity. XI (42): 208–209. doi:10.1017/S0003598X0011662X. S2CID 246041270.
- Maryon, Herbert (1936e). "Excavation of two Bronze Age barrows at Kirkhaugh, Northumberland" (PDF). Archaeologia Aeliana. 4. XIII: 207–217. ISSN 0261-3417.
- Maryon, Herbert (September 1937). "A Passage on Sculpture by Diodorus of Sicily". Antiquity. XI (43): 344–348. doi:10.1017/S0003598X0011676X. S2CID 164044237.
- Maryon, Herbert (April 1938a). "The Technical Methods of the Irish Smiths in the Bronze and Early Iron Ages". Proceedings of the Royal Irish Academy, Section C. XLIV: 181–228. JSTOR 25516012.
- Maryon, Herbert (July 1938b). "Some Prehistoric Metalworkers' Tools". The Antiquaries Journal. XVIII (3): 243–250. doi:10.1017/S0003581500007228. S2CID 162107631.
- Maryon, Herbert (June 1939a). "Ancient Hand-Anvil from Thomastown, Co. Kilkenny" (PDF). Journal of the Cork Historical and Archaeological Society. XLIV (159): 62–63. ISSN 0010-8731. Archived (PDF) from the original on 11 April 2018.
- Maryon, Herbert (1939b). "The Gold Ornaments from Cooper's Hill, Alnwick". Archaeologia Aeliana. 4. XVI: 101–108. ISSN 0261-3417.
- Maryon, Herbert (November 1941a). "Archæology and Metallurgy. I. Welding and Soldering". Man. XLI: 118–124. doi:10.2307/2791583. JSTOR 2791583.
- Maryon, Herbert (November 1941b). "Archæology and Metallurgy: II. The Metallurgy of Gold and Platinum in Pre-Columbian Ecuador". Man. XLI: 124–126. doi:10.2307/2791584. JSTOR 2791584.
- Maryon, Herbert (July 1944). "The Bawsey Torc". The Antiquaries Journal. XXIV (3–4): 149–151. doi:10.1017/S0003581500095640. S2CID 163446426.
- Maryon, Herbert (March 1946). "The Sutton Hoo Shield". Antiquity. XX (77): 21–30. doi:10.1017/S0003598X00019232. S2CID 162472027.
- Maryon, Herbert (September 1947). "The Sutton Hoo Helmet". Antiquity. XXI (83): 137–144. doi:10.1017/S0003598X00016598. S2CID 163948719.
- Maryon, Herbert (1948a). "A Sword of the Nydam Type from Ely Fields Farm, near Ely". Proceedings of the Cambridge Antiquarian Society. XLI: 73–76. doi:10.5284/1034398.
- Maryon, Herbert (March 1948b). "The Mildenhall Treasure, Some Technical Problems: Part I". Man. XLVIII: 25–27. JSTOR 2792450.
- Maryon, Herbert (April 1948c). "The Mildenhall Treasure, Some Technical Problems: Part II". Man. XLVIII: 38–41. JSTOR 2792704.
- Maryon, Herbert (April 1949). "Metal Working in the Ancient World". American Journal of Archaeology. LII (2): 93–125. doi:10.2307/500498. JSTOR 500498. S2CID 193115115.
- Maryon, Herbert (July 1950). "A Sword of the Viking Period from the River Witham". The Antiquaries Journal. XXX (3–4): 175–179. doi:10.1017/S0003581500087849. S2CID 162436131.
- Maryon, Herbert (April 1951). "New Light on the Royal Gold Cup". The British Museum Quarterly. XVI (2): 56–58. doi:10.2307/4422320. JSTOR 4422320.
- Maryon, Herbert (June 1953). "The King John Cup at King's Lynn". The Connoisseur: 88–89. ISSN 0010-6275.
- Maryon, Herbert (October 1955). "Welding in Ancient Times". Welding and Metal Fabrication. 23 (10). London: The Louis Cassier Company, Ltd.: 383–389. OCLC 49957233.
- Maryon, Herbert (1956b). "The Colossus of Rhodes". The Journal of Hellenic Studies. LXXVI: 68–86. doi:10.2307/629554. JSTOR 629554. S2CID 162892604.
- Maryon, Herbert (September 1958). "Herbert Maryon Writes About Granulation". Goldsmiths Journal. LXIV (475). London: N.A.G. Press, Ltd.: 412–414. OCLC 4711137.
- Maryon, Herbert (October 1958). "Granulation". Goldsmiths Journal. LXIV (476). London: N.A.G. Press, Ltd.: 481. OCLC 4711137.
- Plenderleith, H. J. & Maryon, Herbert (January 1959). "The Royal Bronze Effigies in Westminster Abbey". The Antiquaries Journal. XXXIX (1–2): 87–90. doi:10.1017/S0003581500083633. S2CID 163228818.
- Maryon, Herbert (February 1960a). "Pattern-Welding and Damascening of Sword-Blades—Part 1: Pattern-Welding". Studies in Conservation. 5 (1): 25–37. doi:10.2307/1505063. JSTOR 1505063.
- Maryon, Herbert (May 1960b). "Pattern-Welding and Damascening of Sword-Blades—Part 2: The Damascene Process". Studies in Conservation. 5 (2): 52–60. doi:10.2307/1504953. JSTOR 1504953.
- Maryon, Herbert (1961). "The Making of a Chinese Bronze Mirror". Archives of the Chinese Art Society of America. XV: 21–25. JSTOR 20067029.
- Maryon, Herbert; Organ, R. M.; Ellis, O. W.; Brick, R. M. & Sneyers, E. E. (April 1961). "Early Near Eastern Steel Swords". American Journal of Archaeology. 65 (2): 173–184. doi:10.2307/502669. JSTOR 502669. S2CID 191383430.
- Maryon, Herbert (1963). "The Making of a Chinese Bronze Mirror, Part 2". Archives of the Chinese Art Society of America. XVII: 23–25. JSTOR 20067056.
- Maryon, Herbert (1963). "A Note on Magic Mirrors". Archives of the Chinese Art Society of America. XVII: 26–28. JSTOR 20067057.

=== Reviews ===
- Maryon, Herbert (March 1952). "Review of Notes on the Prehistoric Metallurgy of Copper and Bronze in the Old World". Man. LII. London: The Royal Anthropological Institute: 42–43. JSTOR 2839342.
- Maryon, Herbert (October 1960). "Review of Der Überfangguss. Ein Beitrag zur vorgeschichtlichen Metalltechnik". American Journal of Archaeology. 64 (4). Archaeological Institute of America: 374–375. doi:10.2307/501341. JSTOR 501341.
- Maryon, Herbert (June 1962). "Review of A History of Metallography". Isis. 53 (2). Baltimore, Maryland: The Johns Hopkins Press: 244–246. JSTOR 228045.
- Maryon, Herbert (December 1963). "Review of Bronze Casting and Bronze Alloys in Ancient China". The Art Bulletin. XLV (4). New York: College Art Association of America: 394–396. JSTOR 3048130.

=== Encyclopedia entries ===
- Maryon, Herbert (1950). "Bronze Disease". Chambers's Encyclopædia. Vol. II (New ed.). London: George Newnes Limited. p. 605. OCLC 8413512.

- Published in the United States as Maryon, Herbert (1950). "Bronze Disease". Chambers's Encyclopædia. Vol. II (New ed.). New York: Oxford University Press. p. 605. OCLC 265899.. Republished in subsequent editions, including Maryon, Herbert (1959). "Bronze Disease". Chambers's Encyclopædia. Vol. II (New ed.). London: George Newnes Limited. p. 588. OCLC 3299023.; Maryon, Herbert (1966). "Bronze Disease". Chambers's Encyclopædia. Vol. II (New Revised ed.). Oxford: Pergamon Press. p. 588. OCLC 8185514.

- Maryon, Herbert (1950). "Bronzework". Chambers's Encyclopædia. Vol. II (New ed.). London: George Newnes Limited. pp. 605–606. OCLC 8413512.

- Published in the United States as Maryon, Herbert (1950). "Bronzework". Chambers's Encyclopædia. Vol. II (New ed.). New York: Oxford University Press. pp. 605–606. OCLC 265899.. Revised and republished in subsequent editions, including Maryon, Herbert (1959). "Bronzework: Bronze-casting". Chambers's Encyclopædia. Vol. II (New ed.). London: George Newnes Limited. pp. 588–589. OCLC 3299023.; Maryon, Herbert (1966). "Bronzework: Bronze-casting". Chambers's Encyclopædia. Vol. II (New Revised ed.). Oxford: Pergamon Press. pp. 589–590. OCLC 8185514.

- Maryon, Herbert (1950). "Damascening". Chambers's Encyclopædia. Vol. IV (New ed.). London: George Newnes Limited. p. 357. OCLC 8413512.

- Revised and republished in subsequent editions, including Maryon, Herbert (1959). "Damascening". Chambers's Encyclopædia. Vol. IV (New ed.). London: George Newnes Limited. p. 357. OCLC 3299023.; Maryon, Herbert (1966). "Damascus Ware". Chambers's Encyclopædia. Vol. IV (New Revised ed.). Oxford: Pergamon Press. p. 361. OCLC 8185514.

- Maryon, Herbert (1950). "Die-Cutting". Chambers's Encyclopædia. Vol. IV (New ed.). London: George Newnes Limited. p. 503. OCLC 8413512.

- Republished in subsequent editions, including Maryon, Herbert (1959). "Die-Cutting". Chambers's Encyclopædia. Vol. IV (New ed.). London: George Newnes Limited. p. 503. OCLC 3299023.; Maryon, Herbert (1966). "Die-Cutting". Chambers's Encyclopædia. Vol. IV (New Revised ed.). Oxford: Pergamon Press. p. 507. OCLC 8185514.

- Maryon, Herbert (1950). "Filigree". Chambers's Encyclopædia. Vol. V (New ed.). London: George Newnes Limited. p. 654. OCLC 8413512.

- Published in the United States as Maryon, Herbert (1950). "Filigree". Chambers's Encyclopædia. Vol. V (New ed.). New York: Oxford University Press. p. 654. OCLC 265899.. Republished in subsequent editions, including Maryon, Herbert (1959). "Filigree". Chambers's Encyclopædia. Vol. V (New ed.). London: George Newnes Limited. p. 654. OCLC 3299023.; Maryon, Herbert (1966). "Filigree". Chambers's Encyclopædia. Vol. V (New Revised ed.). Oxford: Pergamon Press. p. 627. OCLC 8185514.

- Maryon, Herbert (1950). "Gilding of Metals". Chambers's Encyclopædia. Vol. VI (New ed.). London: George Newnes Limited. pp. 350–351. OCLC 8413512.

- Published in the United States as Maryon, Herbert (1950). "Gilding of Metals". Chambers's Encyclopædia. Vol. VI (New ed.). New York: Oxford University Press. pp. 350–351. OCLC 265899.. Republished in subsequent editions, including Maryon, Herbert (1959). "Gilding of Metals". Chambers's Encyclopædia. Vol. VI (New ed.). London: George Newnes Limited. pp. 350–351. OCLC 3299023.; Maryon, Herbert (1966). "Gilding of Metals". Chambers's Encyclopædia. Vol. VI (New Revised ed.). Oxford: Pergamon Press. p. 346. OCLC 8185514.

- Maryon, Herbert (1950). "Gold-Beating". Chambers's Encyclopædia. Vol. VI (New ed.). London: George Newnes Limited. pp. 423–424. OCLC 8413512.

- Published in the United States as Maryon, Herbert (1950). "Gold-Beating". Chambers's Encyclopædia. Vol. VI (New ed.). New York: Oxford University Press. pp. 423–424. OCLC 265899.. Republished in subsequent editions, including Maryon, Herbert (1959). "Gold-Beating". Chambers's Encyclopædia. Vol. VI (New ed.). London: George Newnes Limited. pp. 423–424. OCLC 3299023.; Maryon, Herbert (1966). "Gold-Beating". Chambers's Encyclopædia. Vol. VI (New Revised ed.). Oxford: Pergamon Press. p. 423. OCLC 8185514.

=== Other ===
- Maryon, Herbert & Sadler, Charles A. (13 July 1916). "Shell Base Turning". Practical Letters from Our Readers. The Model Engineer and Electrician. XXXV (794): 29.
- "The Old Castle: Why Not Improve its Precincts? Mr. H. Maryon's Hint". Newcastle Daily Journal and Courant North Star. Vol. 218, no. 25, 601. Newcastle upon Tyne. 5 March 1928. p. 7.

- Excerpt of a lecture.

- Maryon, Herbert (9 December 1933b). "Modern Sculpture". Points of View: Letters from Readers. The Scotsman. No. 28, 248. Edinburgh. p. 15.
- Maryon, Herbert (December 1933c). "Modern Sculpture". The Bookman. LXXXV (507): 411.
- Maryon, Herbert (October 1934). "Modern Sculpture". The Burlington Magazine for Connoisseurs. LXV (CCCLXXIX): 189–190. JSTOR 865986.
- Maryon, Herbert (January 1960). "Query". Readers' Queries. Notes and Queries. New Series. 7 (1). London: Oxford University Press: 36.

== Bibliography ==
- Allen, R. G. D. (1972). "Review of A Memoir of Professor Sir Arthur Bowley (1869-1957) and his Family". Journal of the Royal Statistical Society. Series A. 135 (4). London: Royal Statistical Society: 628–629. JSTOR 2344707.
- "Alston Man's Find: Bronze Age Relics, Two "Barrows' Excavated". Penrith Observer. No. 3, 938. Penrith, Cumbria. 2 March 1937. p. 6.
- "Annie Elizabeth Maryon: England and Wales, National Index of Wills and Administrations, 1858–1957". FamilySearch. 2019.
- Annual Report (PDF) (Report). Vol. 5. Toronto: Royal Ontario Museum. 1953–1954.
- Annual Report to the Board (Report). Toronto: Royal Ontario Museum of Archaeology. July 1953 – June 1954.
- "Art in North England: Annual Exhibition at Newcastle". The Yorkshire Post. No. 28, 196. Leeds. 13 December 1937. p. 5.
- "Art School Notes: Reading". The International Studio. XXXIV (136). New York: John Lane Co.: 342 June 1908.
- Arwidsson, Greta (1942). Valsgärde 6. Uppsala: Almqvist & Wiksells Boktryckeri A.B.
- Ashbee, Charles Robert (1908). Craftsmanship in Competitive Industry: Being a Record of the Workshops of the Guild of Handicraft, and some Deductions from their Twenty-One Years' Experience. Chipping Campden, Gloucestershire: Essex House Press.
- "Attempt to Deface "Night": Tar and Feathers in Glass Containers". The Manchester Guardian. No. 25, 936. Manchester. 16 October 1929. p. 12.
- B., L. B. (3 January 1934a). "Sculpture". Books of the Day. The Manchester Guardian. No. 27, 243. Manchester. p. 5.
- B., R. P. (July 1934b). "Review of Modern Sculpture". The Burlington Magazine for Connoisseurs. LXV (CCCLXXVI): 50. JSTOR 865852.
- Barclay, R. J. (January–December 1993). "The Conservator: Versatility and Flexibility". Museum International. XLV (4): 35–40. doi:10.1111/j.1468-0033.1993.tb01136.x. Archived (PDF) from the original on 16 October 2018.
- "The Bernard Gilpin Memorial in Kentmere Church". The Northern Counties Magazine. II (7): 2, 54–55. April 1901.
- Biddle, Martin (3 December 2015). "Rupert Leo Scott Bruce-Mitford: 1914–1994" (PDF). Biographical Memoirs of Fellows of the British Academy. XIV. British Academy: 58–86.
- "Blyth Girls' Successes". Blyth News Ashington Post. No. 4, 739. 30 January 1930. p. 5.
- Bowley, Agatha H. (1972). A Memoir of Professor Sir Arthur Bowley (1869–1957) and his Family. Privately printed. OCLC 488656.
- "Boy, 16, Turns Detective To Find Lost TV Specimens". Sunday Bulletin. Vol. 107, no. 356. Philadelphia. 4 April 1954. p. 3.
- "British Museum Expert Speaks Today, 5 P.M. on Ancient Swords". The Tech. Vol. 82, no. 12. Cambridge, Massachusetts. 2 May 1962. p. 1.
- Bruce, Ian (2001). The Loving Eye and Skilful Hand: The Keswick School of Industrial Arts. Carlisle: Bookcase. OCLC 80891576.
- Bruce-Mitford, Rupert (September 1946). "Sutton Hoo Ship-Burial". East Anglian Magazine. 6 (1): 2–9, 43.
- Bruce-Mitford, Rupert (1947). The Sutton Hoo Ship-Burial: A Provisional Guide. London: Trustees of the British Museum.
- Bruce-Mitford, Rupert (1949). "The Sutton Hoo Ship-Burial: Recent Theories and Some Comments on General Interpretation" (PDF). Proceedings of the Suffolk Institute of Archaeology. XXV (1). Ipswich: 1–78.
- Bruce-Mitford, Rupert (23 July 1965). "Mr. Herbert Maryon". Obituary. The Times. No. 56381. London. p. 14.
- Bruce-Mitford, Rupert (March 1968). "Sutton Hoo Excavations, 1965–7". Antiquity. XLII (165): 36–39. doi:10.1017/S0003598X00033810. S2CID 163655331.
- Bruce-Mitford, Rupert (1970). Preface. The Treasure of Sutton Hoo: Ship-Burial for an Anglo-Saxon King. By Grohskopf, Bernice. New York: Atheneum. LCCN 74-86555.
- Bruce-Mitford, Rupert (Autumn 1972). "The Sutton Hoo Helmet: A New Reconstruction". The British Museum Quarterly. XXXVI (3–4). British Museum: 120–130. doi:10.2307/4423116. JSTOR 4423116.
- Bruce-Mitford, Rupert (1974a). Aspects of Anglo-Saxon Archaeology: Sutton Hoo and Other Discoveries. London: Victor Gollancz Limited. ISBN 0-575-01704-X.
- Bruce-Mitford, Rupert (1974b). "Exhibits at Ballots: 5. A replica of the Sutton Hoo Helmet Made in the Tower Armouries, 1973". The Antiquaries Journal. LIV (2): 285–286. doi:10.1017/S0003581500042529. S2CID 246055329.
- Bruce-Mitford, Rupert (1975). The Sutton Hoo Ship-Burial, Volume 1: Excavations, Background, the Ship, Dating and Inventory. London: British Museum Publications. ISBN 978-0-7141-1334-0.
- Bruce-Mitford, Rupert (1978). The Sutton Hoo Ship-Burial, Volume 2: Arms, Armour and Regalia. London: British Museum Publications. ISBN 978-0714113319.
- Bruce-Mitford, Rupert (1983a). The Sutton Hoo Ship-Burial, Volume 3: Late Roman and Byzantine Silver, Hanging-Bowls, Drinking Vessels, Cauldrons and Other Containers, Textiles, the Lyre, Pottery Bottle and Other Items. Vol. I. London: British Museum Publications. ISBN 978-0-7141-0529-1.
- Bruce-Mitford, Rupert (1983b). The Sutton Hoo Ship-Burial, Volume 3: Late Roman and Byzantine Silver, Hanging-Bowls, Drinking Vessels, Cauldrons and Other Containers, Textiles, the Lyre, Pottery Bottle and Other Items. Vol. II. London: British Museum Publications. ISBN 978-0-7141-0530-7.
- Bruce-Mitford, Rupert (1989a). "Early Thoughts on Sutton Hoo" (PDF). Saxon (10). Archived from the original (PDF) on 18 December 2021.
- Bruce-Mitford, Rupert (1989b). Anglo-Saxon and Mediaeval Archaeology, History and Art, with Special Reference to Sutton Hoo: The Highly Important Working Library and Archive of More than 6,000 Titles Formed by Dr. Rupert L.S. Bruce-Mitford FBA, D.Litt., FSA. Wickmere: Merrion Book Co.
  - Includes prefatory essays My Japanese Background and Forty Years with Sutton Hoo by Bruce-Mitford. The latter was republished in Carver 2004, pp. 23–28.
- Buckman, David (1998). Dictionary of Artists in Britain since 1945. Bristol: Art Dictionaries Ltd. ISBN 0-9532609-0-9.
- "By Balloon to Parnassus". The New Statesman and Nation. New Series. VI (148): 848. 23 December 1933.
- Caple, Chris (2000). "Restoration: 9A Case study: Sutton Hoo Helmet". Conservation Skills: Judgement, Method and Decision Making. Abingdon: Routledge. ISBN 978-0-415-18880-7.
- Carver, Martin (2004). "Before 1983" (PDF). Sutton Hoo Field Reports (Data Set). 2. doi:10.5284/1000266.
- Catalogue of the Sixth Exhibition. London: Arts & Crafts Exhibition Society. 1899.
- Catalogue of the Eighth Exhibition. London: Arts & Crafts Exhibition Society. 1906.
- Catalogue of the Ninth Exhibition. London: Arts & Crafts Exhibition Society. 1910.
- "Chester Artist's Success". The Cheshire Observer. Vol. LXI, no. 3, 174. Chester. 7 June 1913. p. 10.
- "Contributors to this Issue: Herbert Maryon". Studies in Conservation. 5 (1). The International Institute for Conservation of Historic and Artistic Works. February 1960. JSTOR 1505065.
  - Identical bio listed in "Contributors to this Issue: Herbert Maryon". Studies in Conservation. 5 (2). The International Institute for Conservation of Historic and Artistic Works. May 1960. JSTOR 1504958.
- "The Craft of the Metal-Worker". The Westminster Gazette. Vol. XLI, no. 6, 131. London. 21 January 1913. p. 3.
- Crouch, Philip & Barnes, Jamie. "A Brief History of the Keswick School of Industrial Art" (PDF). Allerdale Borough Council. Archived from the original (PDF) on 21 October 2016.
- "Current Literature: Modern Sculpture". The Spectator. 152 (5, 506): 30. 5 January 1934.
- D., N. (November 1913). "Review of Metalwork and Enamelling". The Burlington Magazine for Connoisseurs. XXIV (CXXVIII): 114. JSTOR 859532.
- de Callataÿ, Godefroid (2006). "The Colossus of Rhodes: Ancient Texts and Modern Representations". In Ligota, Christopher R. & Quantin, Jean-Louis (eds.). History of Scholarship: A Selection of Papers from the Seminar on the History of Scholarship Held Annually at the Warburg Institute. London: Oxford University Press. pp. 39–73. ISBN 978-0-19-928431-3.
- "Departments of Humanities and Metallurgy". Lectures. The Boston SUnday Globe. Vol. CLXXXI, no. 119. Boston. 29 April 1962. p. A42.
- Dickie, Matthew Wallace (1996). "What Is a Kolossos and How Were Kolossoi Made in the Hellenistic Period?". Greek, Roman, and Byzantine Studies. 37 (3). Duke University Press: 237–257.
- Easby, Dudley T. Jr. (October 1965). "Samuel Kirkland Lothrop, 1892–1965". American Antiquity. 21 (2:1). Society for American Archaeology: 256–261. doi:10.1017/S0002731600088545. JSTOR 2693994. S2CID 164871894.
- Easby, Dudley T. Jr. (July 1966). "Necrology". American Journal of Archaeology. 70 (3). Archaeological Institute of America: 287. doi:10.1086/AJS501899. JSTOR 501899. S2CID 245268774.
- "Eden and Keswick Links to Antiques and Collectibles". Cumberland & Westmorland Herald. 25 June 2005. Archived from the original on 12 February 2020.
- Engstrom, Robert; Lankton, Scott Michael & Lesher-Engstrom, Audrey (1989). A Modern Replication Based on the Pattern-Welded Sword of Sutton Hoo. Kalamazoo: Medieval Institute Publications, Western Michigan University. ISBN 978-0-918720-29-0.
- Ferrari, Dino (6 May 1934). "Some of the Sculpture of Our Day". Book Review. The New York Times. Vol. LXXXIII, no. 27, 861. New York City. pp. 5–21.
- "Fieldwork Module 2b: Kirkhaugh Cairns Excavation, Project Design". Altogether Archaeology. 2014. Archived (PDF) from the original on 5 December 2025.
- "A Fine and Extremely Rare Late Victorian Signed and Documented Keswick School of Industrial Arts (KSIA) Enamelled Copper Casket". The Salesroom. 29 June 2005.
- "Gilbert Adams: Family of Photographers". Obituaries. The Daily Telegraph. No. 44, 008. London. 14 December 1996. p. 21 – via Newspapers.com.
- Gray, Sara (2009). "Collingridge, Barbara Crystal". The Dictionary of British Women Artists. Cambridge: The Lutterworth Press. p. 75. ISBN 978-0-7188-3084-7.
- Green, Charles (1963). Sutton Hoo: The Excavation of a Royal Ship-Burial. New York: Barnes & Noble.
- Gregory, Edward W. (June–September 1901). "Home Arts and Industries". The Artist: An Illustrated Monthly Record of Arts, Crafts and Industries. XXXI (259). New York: Truslove, Hanson & Comba: 135–140. doi:10.2307/25581626. JSTOR 25581626.
- Grigson, Geoffrey (December 1933). "Review of Modern Sculpture, and Modelling and Sculpture in the Making". The Bookman. LXXXV (507): 213–214. Archived from the original on 3 January 2020.
- Grohskopf, Bernice (1970). The Treasure of Sutton Hoo: Ship-Burial for an Anglo-Saxon King. New York: Atheneum. LCCN 74-86555.
- H., C. (October 1899). "Studio Talk: London". The International Studio. VIII (32). New York: John Lane Co.: 266–271.
- Hale, Duncan (October 2014). "Kirkhaugh Cairn, Tynedale, Northumberland: Geophysical Survey" (PDF). Archaeological Services (3500). Durham University. Archived (PDF) from the original on 5 December 2025.
- "Hawkshead Wedding: Mr. J. G. Darley and Miss Maryon". Barrow News. No. 6, 324. Barrow-in-Furness, Cumbria. 13 July 1929. p. 4.
- Haynes, D. E. L. (1957). "Philo of Byzantium and the Colossus of Rhodes". The Journal of Hellenic Studies. LXXVII (2): 311–312. doi:10.2307/629373. JSTOR 629373. S2CID 162781611.
- "Herbert G Maryon in the 1891 England Census". Ancestry Library. 2005.
- "Herbert James Maryon". Mapping the Practice and Profession of Sculpture in Britain and Ireland 1851–1951. University of Glasgow History of Art. 2011a. Archived from the original on 27 December 2021.
- "Herbert James Maryon". Mapping the Practice and Profession of Sculpture in Britain and Ireland 1851–1951. University of Glasgow History of Art. 2011b. Archived from the original on 30 June 2022.
- "Herbert James Maryon in the England & Wales, Civil Registration Birth Index, 1837–1915". Ancestry Library. 2006.
- "Herbert James Maryon in the 1901 England Census". Ancestry Library. 2005.
- "Herbert James Maryon in the England, Select Marriages, 1538–1973". Ancestry Library. 2014.
- "Herbert James Maryon in the England & Wales, Civil Registration Marriage Index, 1837–1915". Ancestry Library. 2006.
- "Herbert James Maryon in the 1911 England Census". Ancestry Library. 2011.
- "Herbert James Maryon in the England & Wales, Civil Registration Marriage Index, 1916–2005". Ancestry Library. 2010.
- "Herbert James Maryon in the England & Wales, National Probate Calendar (Index of Wills and Administrations), 1858–1966, 1973–1995". Ancestry Library. 2010.
- "Herbert Maryon". Obituary. The Daily Telegraph. No. 34, 285. London. 16 July 1965. p. 18.
- "Herbert Maryon". Deaths. The Ottawa Journal. Vol. 80, no. 187. Ottawa, Ontario. Canadian Press. 21 July 1965. p. 34 – via Newspapers.com.
- "Herbert Maryon". Obituaries. The Brandon Sun. Vol. 84, no. 157. Brandon, Manitoba. Canadian Press. 23 July 1965. p. 11 – via Newspapers.com.
- "Herbert Maryon". Obituaries. The Montreal Star. Vol. 97, no. 168. Montreal, Quebec. Canadian Press. 21 July 1965. p. 18 – via Newspapers.com.
- Historic England. "East Knoyle War Memorial (1438366)". National Heritage List for England.
- Historic England. "University of Reading War Memorial (1113620)". National Heritage List for England.
- "H J Maryon in the Fremantle, Western Australia, Passenger Lists, 1897–1963". Ancestry Library. 2014.
- Huey, Arthur D. (22 March 1962). "Mirrors Fail to Reflect Enthusiasm". The Kansas City Times. Vol. 125, no. 70. Kansas City, Missouri. pp. 1–2. Archived from the original on 27 December 2021 – via Newspapers.com.
- Hughes, Betty (6 April 1962). "Visiting Briton Calls Museum His Cup of Tea". Cleveland Press. Cleveland, Ohio.
- Hyatt, Wesley (1997). "What in the World". The Encyclopedia of Daytime Television. New York: Billboard Books. pp. 458–459. ISBN 0-8230-8315-2.
- The Institution of Mechanical Engineers (1918). "Herbert James Maryon, in To be considered by the Applications Committee on Wednesday, 24th April, and by the Council on Friday, 3rd May 1918.". Proposals for Membership, Etc. London. pp. 337–339 – via Ancestry.com.
- The Institution of Mechanical Engineers (June 1931). "Unveiling of Replica of Tablet Affixed to George Stephenson's Cottage at Wylam-on-Tyne". Proceedings of the Institution of Mechanical Engineers. 120: iv, 249–251. doi:10.1243/PIME_PROC_1931_120_012_02.
- "Inventor of Turbine: Memorial to Sir Charles Parsons Unveiled". The Gazette. Vol. CLXII, no. 51. Montreal. 1 March 1933. p. 11.
- Jeeves, Paul (4 August 2014). "Schoolboys Unearth Golden Hair Tress More than 4,000 Years Old". The Daily Express.
- "Keswick Petty Sessions". Local News. The English Lakes Visitor and Keswick Guardian. Vol. XXX, no. 1, 492. 6 January 1906. p. 4.
- "The Keswick School of Industrial Arts". The English Lakes Visitor and Keswick Guardian. Vol. XXVIII, no. 1, 439. 31 December 1904. p. 4.
- Knutsen, Willie & Knutsen, Will C. (2005). Arctic Sun on My Path: The True Story of America's Last Great Polar Explorer. Explorers Club Books. Guilford, Connecticut: The Lyons Press. ISBN 978-1-59228-672-0.
- "Lantern Lecture". Evening Chronicle. No. 19, 203. Newcastle upon Tyne. 9 November 1937. p. 8.
- Lindqvist, Sune (September 1948). "Sutton Hoo and Beowulf". Antiquity. XXII (87). Translated by Bruce-Mitford, Rupert: 131–140. doi:10.1017/S0003598X00019669. S2CID 164075295.
- "London Museum Man, 88, Is Perfect World Traveler". The Plain Dealer. Cleveland, Ohio. 6 April 1962. p. 10.
- "A Magnificent Silver and Iron Helmet—A Portrait of a Syrian Royal General About the Time of the Crucifixion: Newly Restored and Now Exhibited on Loan at the British Museum". The Illustrated London News. No. 6, 054. 27 August 1955. p. 769.
- "Margaret Joan Sawatsky". Winnipeg Free Press Passages. 8 October 2005.
- Martin-Clarke, D. Elizabeth (1947). Culture in Early Anglo-Saxon England. Baltimore: Johns Hopkins Press.
- "Marriage: Mr. J. G. Darley and Miss Maryon". The Times. No. 45250. London. 9 July 1929. p. 19.
- "Marriages at St Michael and All Angels in the Parish of Hawkshead: Marriages Recorded in the Register for 1924–1933". Lancashire OnLine Parish Clerks.
- Marriott, Charles (18 January 1934). "Books on Sculpture". Literary Supplement. The Times. No. 1668. London. p. 43.
- "Maryon". Deaths. The Daily Telegraph. No. 34, 285. London. 16 July 1965. p. 32 – via Newspapers.com.
- "Maryon, Herbert". "The Studio" Year Book of Decorative Art. London: The Studio. 1909. p. 148.
- "Maryon, Herbert". Who Was Who. Oxford University Press. April 2014.
- Maryon, John Ernest (1895). Records and Pedigree of the Family of Maryon of Essex and Herts. London: Self-published.
- Maryon, John Ernest (October 1897). "556: Maryon Family". Fenland Notes & Queries. III. Peterborough: 141–142.
- Maryon, Mildred (16 November 1903). "Artistic Enamelling and Metalwork". Miscellaneous. The Studio. XXX (128): XXVI.
- Marzinzik, Sonja (2007). The Sutton Hoo Helmet. London: British Museum Press. ISBN 978-0-7141-2325-7.
- "Metalwork and Enamelling". Dover Publications.
- "Mildred J Maryon in the 1901 England Census". Ancestry Library. 2005.
- "Miss (Louisa) Edith C. Maryon". Mapping the Practice and Profession of Sculpture in Britain and Ireland 1851–1951. University of Glasgow History of Art. 2011a. Archived from the original on 26 March 2023.
- "Modern Sculpture". Art Interests. The Scotsman. No. 28, 232. Edinburgh. 21 November 1933. p. 11.
- "The Monuments Men: Maj. Denys Eyre Lankester Haynes (1913–1994)". Monuments Men Foundation.
- "Mortimer War Memorial". War Memorials Register. Imperial War Museums. Archived from the original on 9 October 2018.
- "Mr G. S. Bowman—Miss M. J. Maryon". Forthcoming Marriages. The Scotsman. No. 33, 007. Edinburgh. 12 March 1949. p. 4.
- "New Appointments at Armstrong College". Deaths. The Citizen. Vol. 52, no. 128. Gloucester. Canadian Press. 27 September 1927. p. 6 – via Newspapers.com.
- H., H. H. (11 December 1937). "North Artists' Exhibition: Best for Some Years". The Newcastle Journal. Vol. 227, no. 28, 603. Newcastle upon Tyne. p. 12.
- "The Outrages on London Statues". Our London Correspondence. The Manchester Guardian. No. 25, 580. Manchester. 23 August 1928. p. 8.
- Pedlar, Mary Martha Merion (1956). Genealogy of the Merion–Kienzie and Allied Families. Columbus, Ohio: Self-published. OCLC 5380765.
- Pevsner, Nikolaus (1967). Cumberland and Westmoreland. The Buildings of England. New Haven: Yale University Press. ISBN 0-300-09590-2.
- Plenderleith, H. J. (1956). "Silver: Restoration of the Emesa Helmet". The Conservation of Antiquities and Works of Art: Treatment, Repair, and Restoration. London: Oxford University Press. pp. 226–229.
- Post Office London Commercial and Professional Directory. London: Kelly & Co. 1891.
- "Principal Librarians and Directors of the British Museum". The British Museum. Archived from the original on 21 November 2016.
- "Proceedings of the Society of Antiquaries". The Antiquaries Journal. XXVI (1–2): 106. January–April 1946. doi:10.1017/S0003581500018692. S2CID 246045635.
- "Proceedings of the Society of Antiquaries". The Antiquaries Journal. XXIX (1–2): 135. January 1949. doi:10.1017/S000358150002103X. S2CID 246047309.
- "Proceedings of the Society of Antiquaries". The Antiquaries Journal. XXIX (3–4): 242. July 1949. doi:10.1017/S0003581500017480. S2CID 246047441.
- "Proceedings of the Society of Antiquaries". The Antiquaries Journal. XXXIV (1–2): 144. 1954. doi:10.1017/S0003581500073686. S2CID 246045971.
- Pudney, Stephen (Autumn 2000). "The Keswick School of Industrial Arts: A Victorian Experiment in Artistic Philanthropy". The Silver Society Journal. 12: 134–142.
- "Reading Society of Architects". The Architect. CIX (2, 836): 294. 27 April 1923.
- "Reading University". War Memorials Register. Imperial War Museums.
- "Review of Metalwork and Enamelling". The Athenæum (4442): 737. 14 December 1912.
- "Review of Metalwork and Enamelling". Christmas Supplement. The Bookman. XLIII: 13. December 1912.
- "Review of Metalwork and Enamelling". The Spectator. 110 (4, 413): 130. 25 January 1913.
- "Review of Metalwork and Enamelling". Journal of the Royal Society of Arts. LXI (3, 145): 424. 28 February 1913.
- "Review of Metalwork and Enamelling". The Connoisseur. XXXV: 64. January 1913. ISSN 0010-6275.
- "Review of Modern Sculpture". The Connoisseur. 94: 124. January 1934. ISSN 0010-6275.
- "Review of Modern Sculpture". The News of Books on Art. The Art Digest. VIII (13). New York: The Art Digest, Inc.: 22 1 April 1934.
- "Rima Tarred and Feathered: Epstein Work Subject of Outrage". The Manchester Guardian. No. 25, 931. Manchester. 10 October 1929. p. 11.
- ""Rocket" Centenary: Tablet on George Stephenson's House". Lake Wakatip Mail. No. 3, 909. Queenstown, New Zealand. 6 August 1929. p. 7.
- "Rupert Bruce-Mitford". Obituaries. The Times. No. 64909. London. 23 March 1994. p. 21.
- "Scholastic Honours: New Associates of Reading University College". The Reading Standard. No. 1, 943. 29 May 1912. p. 4.
- Schweppe, Sylvia (29 July 1965a). "Mr. Herbert Maryon". Obituary. The Times. No. 56386. London. p. 12.
- Schweppe, Sylvia (November 1965b). "Herbert Maryon: Fellow of I.I.C.". Studies in Conservation. 10 (4): 176. doi:10.1179/sic.1965.022. ISSN 0039-3630. JSTOR 1505372.
- "Seaby and the New Forest". St Barbe Museum & Art Gallery. Archived from the original on 20 February 2023.
- "Second Effort to Tar Epstein Statue Made". The Battle Creek Enquirer and News. Vol. XXXIV, no. 87. Battle Creek, Michigan. 16 October 1929. p. 11.
- Seyrig, Henri (June 1952). "A Helmet from Emisa". Archaeology. 5 (2). Archaeological Institute of America: 66–69. JSTOR 41663047.
- "Sir Charles Parsons Memorial Plaque". Friends of Discovery Museum. 30 October 2016. Archived from the original on 15 June 2019.
- "Sir Charles Parsons: Memorial Unveiled at Wallsend". Home News. The Times. No. 46308. London. 5 December 1932. pp. 9, 16.
- "Sir Thomas Kendrick: Keeper of British Museum". Obituaries Supplement. The Times. No. 60482. London. 23 November 1979. p. VII.
- Skodnick, Roy (December 1996). "James Metcalf Joins the Smoky Smiths Deya-Paris-Santa Clara del Cobre" (PDF). Gravesiana. I (II). Northampton: Robert Graves Society: 177–204. Archived from the original (PDF) on 7 April 2020.
- "Smaller Gulps". The Times Diary. The Times. No. 58723. London. 5 March 1973. p. 12.
- Smith, Ernest A. (1 May 1913). "The Training of Goldsmiths". Nature. XCI (2270). London: Macmillan and Co.: 210. doi:10.1038/091210a0. S2CID 72336050.
- Sorensen, Lee (21 February 2018). "Kendrick, T. D." Dictionary of Art Historians. Archived from the original on 7 July 2018.
- Spielmann, Marion Harry, ed. (1903). "Chronicle of Art—January". The Magazine of Art. 1: 153–156.
- "Statue (Comedy)". The British Museum Collection Online. The British Museum.
- "Statue (Tragedy)". The British Museum Collection Online. The British Museum.
- "Statue Tarred and Feathered: Outrage in Full View of Crowds". The Manchester Guardian. No. 25, 945. Manchester. 26 October 1929. p. 13.
- "Studio Talk: Keswick". The Studio. XVIII (71): 210–212. January 1903.
- "Studio Talk: Keswick". The Studio. XXXVI (153): 263–264. December 1905.
- "Studio Talk: Keswick". The Studio. XXVII (107): 263–264. January 1906.
- "Supplement". The London Gazette. No. 40787. 25 May 1956. pp. 3099–3138.
- "Surrey Archæologists: Meeting at Guildford". The Surrey Advertiser and County Times. No. 10, 888. Surrey. 15 October 1949. p. 4.
- "Sutton Hoo in 1951". Blogspot. 20 September 2011.
- "The Sutton Hoo Shield". Financial Times. No. 25402. London. 12 March 1971. p. 3.
- "Sutton Hoo Treasures". News in Brief. The Times. No. 50365. London. 1 February 1979. p. 6.
- "Tarred Statute Critics: Newcastle Sculptor's Defence of His Work". The Western Daily Press. Vol. 143, no. 24, 016. Bristol. 29 October 1929. p. 6.
- "Tarred Statue of Industry: Sculptor's Defence of His Work". The Manchester Guardian. No. 25, 947. Manchester. 29 October 1929. p. 3.
- "The Treasure of Sutton Hoo: King's Tomb is Greatest Find in Archaeology of England". Life. Vol. 31, no. 3. New York. 16 July 1951. pp. 82–85.
- "Television". Television and Radio. New York Herald Tribune. Vol. CXIII, no. 39, 220. New York City. 3 April 1954. p. 17.
- "Test of an Artist's Greatness". Newcastle Daily Journal and Courant North Star. Vol. 218, no. 25, 803. Newcastle upon Tyne. 27 October 1928. p. 4. Archived from the original on 18 May 2026.
- Topping, Peter (1957–1958). "Report of the Librarian of the Gennadeion" (PDF). Annual Report. 77. Princeton: American School of Classical Studies at Athens: 34–38.
- ""Tramp in Europe."". Newcastle Daily Journal and Courant North Star. Vol. 218, no. 25, 624. Newcastle upon Tyne. 31 March 1928. p. 10.
- Turnbull, Constance Mary (23 September 2004). "Parkinson, Cyril Northcote". Oxford Dictionary of National Biography (online ed.). Oxford University Press. doi:10.1093/ref:odnb/53127. (Subscription, Wikipedia Library access or UK public library membership required.)
- "U.K. Sculpture Expert Dies in Scotland". Toronto Daily Star. Toronto. Canadian Press. 21 July 1965. p. 36.
- "University College: Staff Appointments". Berkshire Chronicle. No. 4, 978. 25 January 1908. p. 6.
- van Geersdaele, Peter C. (November 1969). "Moulding the Impression of the Sutton Hoo Ship". Studies in Conservation. 14 (4): 177–182. doi:10.2307/1505343. JSTOR 1505343.
- van Geersdaele, Peter C. (August 1970). "Making the Fibre Glass Replica of the Sutton Hoo Ship Impression". Studies in Conservation. 15 (3): 215–220. doi:10.2307/1505584. JSTOR 1505584.
- Who's Who in Art (11th ed.). Eastbourne, Sussex: The Art Trade Press Ltd. 1962.
- Williams, Dyfri (5 October 1994). "Obituary: D. E. L. Haynes". The Independent.
- Williams, Nigel (1992). "The Sutton Hoo Helmet". In Oddy, William Andrew (ed.). The Art of the Conservator. London: British Museum Press. pp. 73–88. ISBN 0-7141-2056-1.
- Wilson, David. M. (1960). Daniel, Glyn (ed.). The Anglo-Saxons. Ancient Peoples and Places. Vol. 16. New York: Frederick A. Praeger. LCCN 60-8369.
- "Women Workers Wanted". The Reading Observer. No. 3, 955. Reading, Berkshire. 18 November 1916. p. 4.

- Related: "Munition Making: More Workers Urgently Required, Particulars of Reading Training Classes". The Reading Observer. No. 3, 955. Reading, Berkshire. 18 November 1916. p. 4.

- "Women as Engineers". The Reading Observer. No. 3, 972. Reading, Berkshire. 17 March 1917. p. 5.
- Wood, Esther (June 1900a). "The Home Arts and Industries Exhibition at the Albert Hall". The Studio. XX (87): 78–88.
- Wood, Esther (July 1900b). "The Home Arts and Industries Exhibition at the Albert Hall". The International Studio. XI (41). New York: John Lane Co.: 78–88.
- Wood, Esther (July 1902). "The Home Arts and Industries Association". The Studio. XXVI (112): 129–134.
- Wright, Graham & Wright, Margaret. "Dallas, Alastair: 1898–1983" (PDF). Gatehouse Folk. Archived (PDF) from the original on 16 July 2024.
- "York Art Master: Mr. W. E. Parkinson Found Dead in Bed". North Mail, Newcastle Daily Chronicle. No. 21, 566. Newcastle upon Tyne. 27 May 1927. p. 7.

=== Colossus articles ===
- "The Colossus Now Gets Debunked". The Austin Statesman. Vol. 83, no. 110. Austin, Texas. 4 December 1953. p. 20 – via Newspapers.com.
- "Ancient Wonder Called Sham: Colossus of Rhodes Is Debunked By Archaeologist". The Battle Creek Enquirer and News. Vol. 54. Battle Creek, Michigan. 4 December 1953. p. 1 – via Newspapers.com.
- "Colossus of Rhodes: Scientist Says Wonder of World Statue Hollow Sham". The Corpus Christi Times. Vol. 44, no. 131. Corpus Christi, Texas. 4 December 1953. p. 8-B – via Newspapers.com.
- "Claims Famed Colossus Was Only Hollow Sham". Des Moines Tribune. Vol. 73, no. 90. Des Moines, Iowa. 4 December 1953. p. 11 – via Newspapers.com.
- "Colossus of Rhodes Is Described As Hollow Sham". The Fresno Bee. Vol. 61, no. 11278. Fresno, California. 4 December 1953. p. 16-A – via Newspapers.com.
- "Sculptor Explodes Myth Of Statue Astride Harbor". Lubbock Evening Journal. Vol. 30, no. 64. Lubbock, Texas. 4 December 1953. p. 10 – via Newspapers.com.
- "Archaeologist Says One Of 7 Wonders Of World A Sham". Macon Chronicle-Herald. Vol. 44, no. 135. Macon, Missouri. 4 December 1953. p. 1 – via Newspapers.com.
- "Researcher Brands Colossus of Rhodes Nothing But Sham". Mason City Globe-Gazette. Vol. LX, no. 48. Mason City, Iowa. 4 December 1953. p. 2 – via Newspapers.com.
- "Colossus of Rhodes a Hollow Sham, British Scientist Says". Moberly Monitor-Index. Vol. 35, no. 131. Moberly, Missouri. 4 December 1953. p. 1 – via Newspapers.com.
- "Colossus Called A Hollow Sham: Rhodes' World Wonder Didn't Straddle Old Port, Says Briton". Journal-Every Evening. Vol. 21, no. 286. Wilmington, Delaware. 4 December 1953. p. 24 – via Newspapers.com.
- "Colossus Of Rhodes, One Of 7 Wonders, Said Sham". The Evening Leader. Vol. 98, no. 146. Staunton, Virginia. 4 December 1953. p. 1 – via Newspapers.com.
- "A Fraud, He Said". Oakland Tribune. Vol. CLIX, no. 157. Oakland, California. 4 December 1953. p. 2 – via Newspapers.com.
- "Colossus Is Termed 'Sham'". The Plain Speaker. Vol. 72, no. 21, 060. Hazleton, Pennsylvania. 4 December 1953. p. 30 – via Newspapers.com.
- "Rhodes Colossus Didn't Span Port, Briton Declares". St. Louis Post-Dispatch. Vol. 106, no. 60. St. Louis, Missouri. 4 December 1953. p. 5C – via Newspapers.com.
- "Rhodes Colossus Is Labelled Sham". Spokane Daily Chronicle. Vol. 68, no. 63. Spokane, Washington. 4 December 1953. p. 12 – via Google News Archive Search.
- "Colossus Called Sham". Tucson Daily Citizen. Vol. LXXXI, no. 290. Tucson, Arizona. 4 December 1953. p. 2 – via Newspapers.com.
- "One of World's 7 Wonders Described as Hollow Sham". The Vernon Daily Record. Vol. XXIX, no. 29. Vernon, Texas. 4 December 1953. p. 9 – via Newspapers.com.
- "Colossus of Rhodes Hollow Sham, Scientist Declares". Abilene Reporter-News. Vol. LXXIII, no. 172. Abilene, Texas. 5 December 1953. p. 8-B – via Newspapers.com.
- "Expert Debunks One of World Wonders: Colossus of Rhodes". Chicago Daily Tribune. Vol. CXII, no. 291. Chicago, Illinois. 5 December 1953. p. 4 – via Newspapers.com.
- "Scientist Describes Colossus Of Rhodes as 'Hollow Sham'". Council Bluffs Nonpareil. Vol. XCVI, no. 339. Council Bluffs, Iowa. 5 December 1953. p. 4 – via Newspapers.com.
- "'Colossus' Is 'Sham:' Scientist". The Daily Times. Vol. LXVII, no. 272. Davenport, Iowa. 5 December 1953. p. 2-B – via Newspapers.com.
- "Hollow Sham?". The Detroit Free Press. Vol. 123, no. 214. Detroit, Michigan. 5 December 1953. p. 7 – via Newspapers.com.
- "Britisher Belittles World Mark". Indiana Evening Gazette. Vol. 54, no. 95. Indiana, Pennsylvania. 5 December 1953. p. 3 – via Newspapers.com.
- "Colossal Phony?". Minneapolis Morning Tribune. Vol. LXXXVII, no. 195. Minneapolis, Minnesota. 5 December 1953. p. 12 – via Newspapers.com.
- "Colossus Of Rhodes 'Sham'". Petaluma Argus-Courier. Vol. 26, no. 110. Petaluma, California. 5 December 1953. p. 6 – via Newspapers.com.
- "Colossus of Rhodes Hollow Sham, British Scientist Says". The San Bernardino Daily Sun. Vol. LX, no. 83. San Bernardino, California. 5 December 1953. p. 21 – via Newspapers.com.
- "Colossus Just "Sham"". Saskatoon Star-Phoenix. Vol. 52, no. 42. Saskatoon, Saskatchewan. 5 December 1953. p. 19 – via Newspapers.com.
- "Colossus Only Small Giant, Briton Holds". The Washington Post. No. 28, 296. Washington, D.C. 5 December 1953. p. 4. ProQuest 152536781.
- "Debunking Old Beliefs Doesn't Hurt The Colossus". The Battle Creek Enquirer and News. Vol. 54. Battle Creek, Michigan. 6 December 1953. p. 6 – via Newspapers.com.
- "Scientist Describes Colossus Of Rhodes as 'Hollow Sham'". Council Bluffs Nonpareil. Vol. XCVI, no. 340. Council Bluffs, Iowa. 6 December 1953. p. 7-B – via Newspapers.com.
- "British Scientist States Colossus Is Hollow Sham". The Odessa American. Vol. XXVIII, no. 211. Odessa, Texas. 6 December 1953. p. 3 – via Newspapers.com.
- "Says Colossus Of Rhodes Was Sham". Santa Cruz Sentinel-News. Vol. 98, no. 289. Santa Cruz, California. 6 December 1953. p. 21 – via Newspapers.com.
- "Describe Colossus Of Rhodes as Sham". The Sedalia Democrat. Vol. 85, no. 288. Sedalia, Missouri. 6 December 1953. p. 13 – via Newspapers.com.
- "Collossus [sic] of Rhodes Described as Hollow Sham by Scientist". The Progress-Index. Vol. LXXXIX, no. 155. Petersburg, Virginia. 7 December 1953. p. 12 – via Newspapers.com.
- "Describes One of Seven Wonders Of World As Being Just A Hollow Sham". The Bryan Daily Eagle. Vol. 77, no. 138. Bryan, Texas. 8 December 1953. p. 10 – via Newspapers.com.
- "Oh, The Shame of This Sham". The Indianapolis News. Vol. 85. Indianapolis, Indiana. 8 December 1953. p. 3 – via Newspapers.com.
- "Ancient World Wonder Called Hollow Sham". Reno Evening Gazette. Vol. 77, no. 216. Reno, Nevada. 8 December 1953. p. 7 – via Newspapers.com.
- "Full Circle". The Nashville Tennessean. Vol. 47, no. 223. Nashville, Tennessee. 8 December 1953. p. 20 – via Newspapers.com.
- "Only 6 1/2 World Wonders?". The Kansas City Times. Vol. 116, no. 297. Kansas City, Missouri. 12 December 1953. p. 34 – via Newspapers.com.
- Parker, T. H. (13 December 1953). "The Lively Arts: The Mighty and the Fallen". The Hartford Courant. Vol. CXVII. Hartford, Connecticut. p. IV (2) – via Newspapers.com.
- "Spare Us Something". The Indianapolis News. Vol. 85. Indianapolis, Indiana. 15 December 1953. p. 10 – via Newspapers.com.
- "Spare Us Something". Muncie Evening Press. Vol. LXI, no. 267. Muncie, Indiana. 16 December 1953. p. 4 – via Newspapers.com.
- "Fraudulent Colossos [sic]". Corsicana Daily Sun. Vol. 58, no. 165. Corsicana, Texas. 21 December 1953. p. 2 (8) – via Newspapers.com.
- "Guest Editorial: Losing the Seventh Wonder". The Hammond Times. Vol. XVLIII, no. 176. Hammond, Indiana. 14 January 1954. p. 6 – via Newspapers.com.
- "Only 6 1/2 Wonders?". Tucson Daily Citizen. Vol. LXXXII, no. 30. Tucson, Arizona. 4 February 1954. p. 12 – via Newspapers.com.
- Wade, William (20 January 1954). "Folklore". The Anderson Herald. Vol. 86, no. 185. Anderson, Indiana. p. 4 – via Newspapers.com.
- "Ancient "Wonder" Doubted". The Red Deer Advocate. Vol. LIII, no. 12. Red Deer, Alberta. 24 March 1954. p. 7-4 – via Newspapers.com.
- "Ancient 'Wonder' Doubted". Alton Evening Telegraph. Vol. CXIX, no. 60. Alton, Illinois. 25 March 1954. p. 5 – via Newspapers.com.
- "Ancient 'Wonder' Doubted". The Grape Belt and Chautauqua Farmer. Vol. LX, no. 27. Dunkirk, New York. 2 April 1954. p. 18 – via Newspapers.com.
- "Old 'Wonder' Doubted". The Greeley Daily Tribune. Vol. 46, no. 208. Greeley, Colorado. 1 May 1954. p. 7 – via Newspapers.com.
- "Ancient "Wonder" Doubted". Wausau Daily Record-Herald. Vol. XLVI, no. 171. Wasau, Wisconsin. 21 June 1954. p. 16 – via Newspapers.com.
- "Colossus: still a Romantic hope". Wednesday Magazine. The Canberra Times. Vol. 61, no. 18, 919. Canberra. 22 July 1987. p. 15.
- Scarre, Chris (31 August 1991). "From Rhodes to Ruins". Saturday Review. The Times. No. 64113. London. p. 14[S].
