= London Road Campus =

Campus of the University of Reading

Coordinates: 51°27′00.07″N 0°57′41.87″W

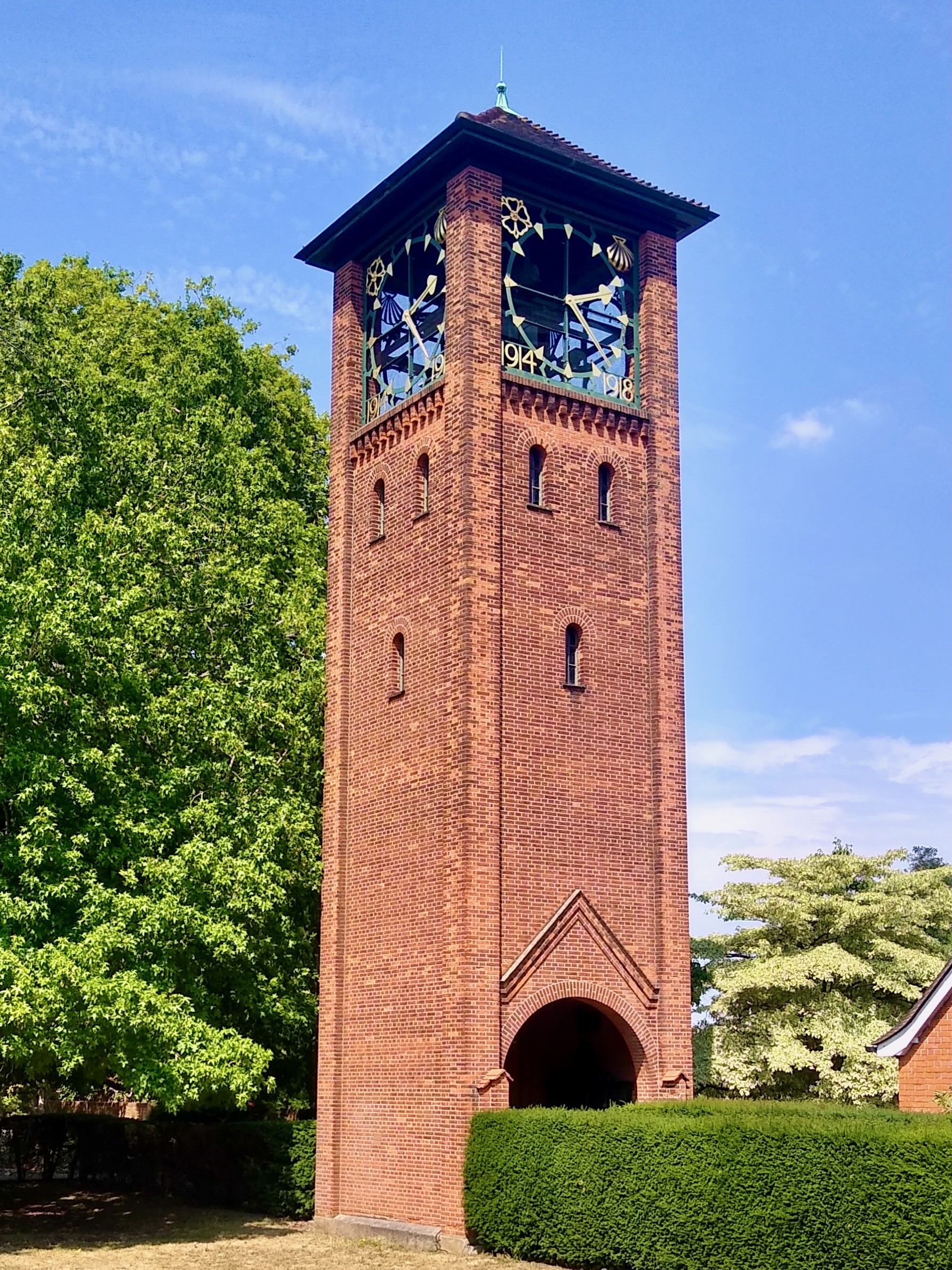
The University of Reading War Memorial clock tower, designed by Herbert Maryon

The London Road Campus of the University of Reading is the original campus of that university. It is on the London Road, immediately to the south of Reading town centre in the English county of Berkshire.

== History ==
The site for the campus was given to the university in 1904 by the Palmer family, owners of Reading's Huntley & Palmers biscuit makers. It served as the university's main site until after the much larger Whiteknights Campus was acquired in 1947.

The University Great Hall, which plays host to the university graduation ceremonies, is to be found at London Road. The University's war memorial, which takes the form of a clock tower, is situated near the Great Hall.

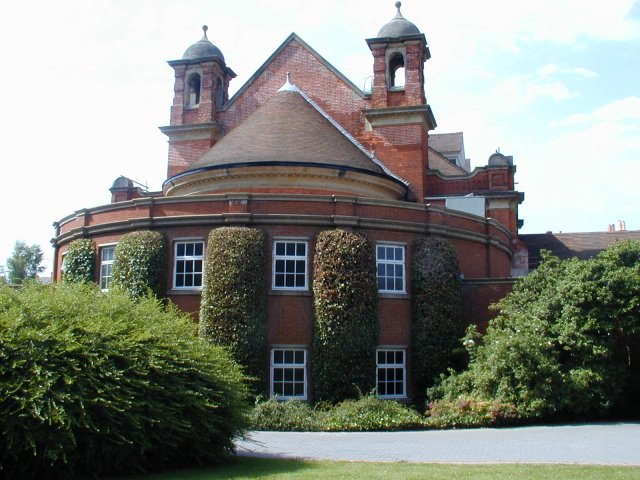
Exterior of the Great Hall from the south

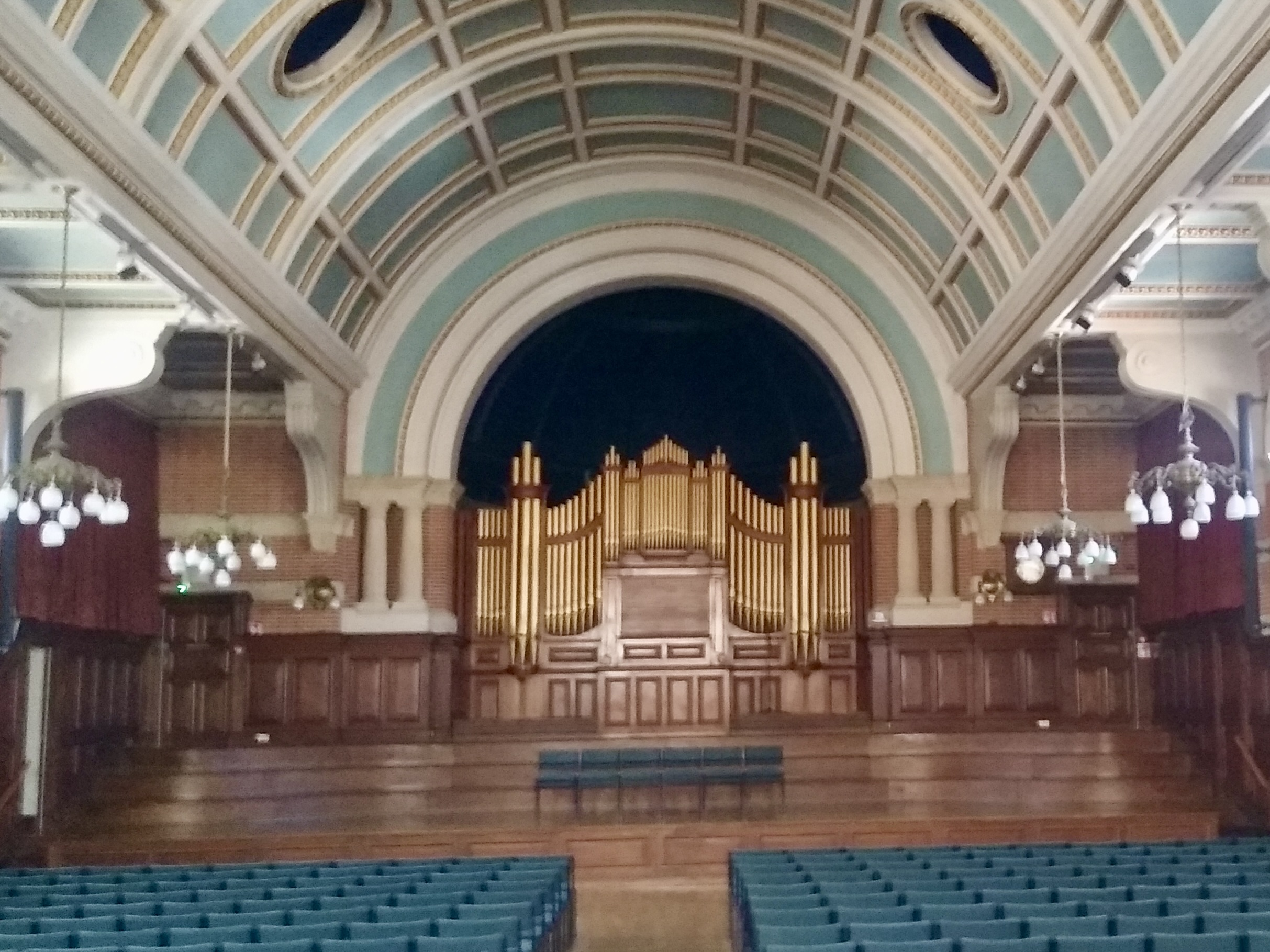
Interior of the Great Hall

While most departments of the university have now relocated to the university's other campuses, London Road is still home to several university departments and facilities. These include the School of Continuing Education, the School of Health & Social Care, Estates Management, the University Archive Service, the Innovation Centre @ Reading and the Cotton Club.

The campus is currently undergoing a major renovation, preparatory to becoming the new home of the university's Institute of Education. This commenced in mid-2010 and is planned for completion in the summer of 2011, at an estimated cost of £30 million. The work is being partially funded by the sale of the adjoining site of Mansfield Hall, a former hall of residence, for demolition and replacement by private sector student accommodation.

The London Road Campus is separated from the Royal Berkshire Hospital by Redlands Road, whilst the grade II* listed Albion Terrace is on the other side of London Road. The university run Museum of English Rural Life is located on Redlands Road just to the south of the campus.
