= Ian Inkster =

British historian (1949–2023)

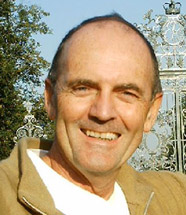
- Born: 4 August 1949; Warrington, England
- Died: 2 August 2023 (aged 73)
- Known for: Global History
- Website: https://www.soas.ac.uk/staff/staff87907.php

Ian Inkster (4 August 1949 – 2 August 2023) was a global historian, author and columnist. He was professor of international history at Nottingham Trent University, a prolific writer, editor of the History of Technology book series since 2002 and frequent contributor to Taiwan's Taipei Times, and South China Morning Post. Beginning in the early 1970s, he wrote many books and articles on the influence of scientific and technological change on the course of global history since the 18th century, with particular focus on the UK and Japan, and was a frequent commentator on international relations.

== Life ==
Born in Warrington, England, raised in Khartoum, Edinburgh, Lowestoft, and Harlow, educated in England, he had university faculty positions in UK, Australia, Japan, and Taiwan. He was married and had five adult children. He alternated between living in Bloomsbury, London and in L’Escala (Spain), residing and working in Taiwan.

== Works ==
=== Books ===
- Inkster, Ian (2001) Japanese industrialisation: historical and cultural perspectives. London: Routledge at Google Books
- Inkster, Ian and Bryson, M. (1999) Industrial man. The life and works of Charles Sylvester, engineer, 1776–1828. Salt Lake City: Jackpot Books.
- Inkster, Ian (1998) Technology and industrialisation: historical case studies and international perspectives. Aldershot: Ashgate.
- Inkster, Ian (1997) Scientific culture and urbanisation in industrialising Britain. London: Ashgate. (Variorum Collected Studies Series)
- Inkster, Ian (1991) Clever city: Japan, Australia and the Multifunction Polis. Sydney University Press.
- Inkster, Ian (1991) Science and technology in history: an approach to industrialisation. London: Macmillan at Google Books
- Inkster, Ian (1982) Science, public science and science policy in Australia circa, 1880s-1916. Canberra: Basser Library, Australian Academy of Science.
- Inkster, Ian (1981) Science, technology and the late development effect. Tokyo: Institute of Developing Economies. (V.R.F. series, no. 84)
- Inkster, Ian (1980) Japan as a development model? Relative backwardness and technological transfer. Bochum: Brockmeyer.

== See also ==
- List of University of London people
- List of historians
