= Kirkhaugh cairns =

Bronze age burials

The Kirkhaugh cairns are two, or possibly three, Bronze Age burials located in Kirkhaugh, Northumberland. The two confirmed graves were excavated in 1935 and re-excavated in 2014. The first grave, dubbed Cairn 1, contained grave goods consistent with a high-status metalworker. These included two of the earliest gold ornaments, and one of the earliest bell beakers, known in Britain. The second grave was found empty.

== Excavation ==
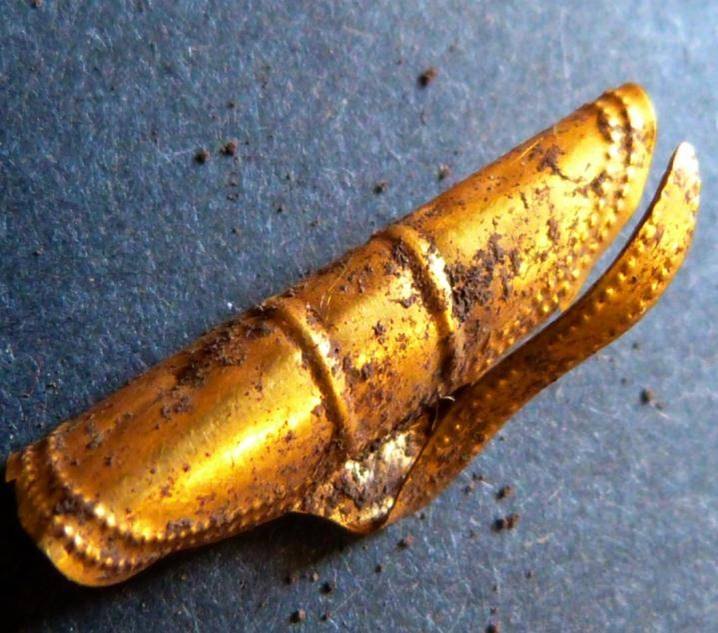
One of the gold ornaments

The Kirkhaugh cairns were excavated over five days in 1935 by Herbert Maryon. Then master of sculpture at Durham University's Armstrong College, Maryon was interested in archaeology and frequently excavated sites with his students. (Note: In a second career, after retiring from Armstrong, Maryon was hired by the British Museum to conserve the objects from the Anglo-Saxon Sutton Hoo ship-burial.) He was assisted by Joseph William Alderson at Kirkhaugh, carrying out the excavation on 18–21 September, and on 12 October.

Upon removal of the turf from the first mound, Maryon found what he described as "a continuous layer of flattish stones" underneath. These were piled on top of each other, and varied in size from several inches in length to two feet; the larger stones weighed between 50 and 100 pounds. Beneath the stones was a mixture of light earth and small stones. No body was found, but near the centre of the cairn, where a body might have been placed, were patches of greasy clay on the rock surface. Also in the centre were found the majority of the grave goods. Maryon described these as a crushed food vessel; "1 gold ear-ring"; "1 flint arrowhead"; "1 flint saw"; "6 worked flakes of flint"; "2 flint cores, and a number of unworked flakes"; "1 whetstone, or hone"; "1 coarse rubber of sandstone"; "1 rough nodule of glazed ware"; "1 vase or mug handle"; and "a fragment of coarse pottery, a nodule of iron pyrites, and some pieces of charcoal." With the exception of the food vessel, found about four and a half feet from the centre, and some of the charcoal, all of the finds were in the central area about three or four feet in diameter.

The crushed food vessel identified by Maryon has subsequently been termed a bell beaker, and as one of, or perhaps the, earliest type yet found in Britain. What Maryon termed an earring has also been re-identified, as a hair braid; it is one of the oldest metal objects found in the country. In 2014, during a re-excavation of the cairns using community volunteers, four boys—two of whom were great-grandsons of Alderson—discovered a matching hair braid.

== Bibliography ==
- "Andrew Fitzpatrick". University of Leicester. Archived from the original on 29 March 2021.
- Bruce-Mitford, Rupert (23 July 1965). "Mr. Herbert Maryon". Obituary. The Times. No. 56381. London. p. 14.
- "Contributors to this Issue: Herbert Maryon". Studies in Conservation. 5 (1). The International Institute for Conservation of Historic and Artistic Works. February 1960. JSTOR 1505065.
- "Contributors to this Issue: Herbert Maryon". Studies in Conservation. 5 (2). The International Institute for Conservation of Historic and Artistic Works. May 1960. JSTOR 1504958.
- Cowen, John D. (1966). "Prehistoric Notes" (PDF). Archaeologia Aeliana. 4. XLIV: 209–235. ISSN 0261-3417.
- Crawford, Lauren (26 August 2014). "Schoolboys Strike Gold as they Unearth 4,300-Year-Old Gold Hair Ornament". North Pennines. Archived from the original on 17 October 2018.
- "Fieldwork Module 2b: Kirkhaugh Cairns Excavation, Project Design" (PDF). Altogether Archaeology. 2014. Archived from the original (PDF) on 21 September 2023.
- Fitzpatrick, Andrew P. (2011). The Amesbury Archer and the Boscombe Bowmen: Bell Beaker burials at Boscombe Down, Amesbury, Wiltshire. Wessex Archaeology Report. Vol. 27. Salisbury: Wessex Archaeology. ISBN 978-1-874350-54-5.
- Fitzpatrick, Andrew P. (2014). "Kirkhaugh Bronze Age Cairn: Northumberland's earliest gold object" (PDF). Archaeology in Northumberland. 21. Northumberland County Council: 28–29. ISSN 1357-7255.
- Fitzpatrick, Andrew P. (April 2015). "The Kirkhaugh Cairn: an old find and a new tale" (PDF). PAST (79). London: The Prehistoric Society: 4–6. Archived (PDF) from the original on 26 February 2026.
- Fitzpatrick, Andrew P. (2021). "The end of the Neolithic? Early Bell Beaker groups in northern England". In Hey, Gill & Frodsham, Paul (eds.). New Light on the Neolithic of Northern England. Oxford: Oxbow Books. pp. 223–236. ISBN 978-1-78925-266-8. JSTOR j.ctv13nb8nr.21.
- Fitzpatrick, Andrew P. & Frodsham, Paul (2016). "The end of the Neolithic? Kirkhaugh and the earliest Bell Beakers in northern England" (Abstracts programme). The Neolithic of Northern England: Annual Conference 2016, 21–23 October. Royal Archaeological Society with The Prehistoric Society and The Cumberland & Westmorland Antiquarian & Archaeological Society: 8–9.
- Fowler, Chris (2013). The Emergent Past: A Relational Realist Archaeology of Early Bronze Age Mortuary Practices. Oxford: Oxford University Press. doi:10.1093/acprof:osobl/9780199656370.001.0001. ISBN 978-0-19-965637-0.
- Frodsham, Paul (2016). "Altogether Archaeology in the North Pennines Area of Outstanding Natural Beauty" (PDF). Archaeology in Northumberland. 22. Northumberland County Council: 42–44. ISSN 1357-7255.
- Hale, Duncan (October 2014). "Kirkhaugh Cairn, Tynedale, Northumberland: Geophysical Survey" (PDF). Archaeological Services (3500). Durham University. Archived from the original (PDF) on 21 September 2023.
- Jeeves, Paul (4 August 2014). "Schoolboys unearth golden hair tress more than 4,000 years old". The Daily Express.
- "Kirkhaugh, barrow". Ariadne. Archived from the original on 31 March 2021.
- Kirkhaugh Bell Beaker Burial: Belief Travel and Metal - Andrew Fitzpatrick. 16 July 2021.
- Knutsen, Willie & Knutsen, Will C. (2005). Arctic Sun on My Path: The True Story of America's Last Great Polar Explorer. Explorers Club Books. Guilford, Connecticut: The Lyons Press. ISBN 978-1-59228-672-0.
- Maryon, Herbert (1936). "Excavation of two Bronze Age barrows at Kirkhaugh, Northumberland" (PDF). Archaeologia Aeliana. 4. XIII: 207–217. ISSN 0261-3417.
- "Object #2 - Kirkhaugh Gold Hair Tress-Rings". North Pennines Virtual Museum. Archived from the original on 29 March 2021.
- "Record ID: DUR-02828D – Bronze Age Jewellery". Portable Antiquities Scheme. 10 September 2014.
- Robinson, James (25 December 2020). "Coroner rules object found at Kirkhaugh Cairn is treasure". Hexham Courant. Archived from the original on 28 March 2021.
