= Chris Caple =

Archaeologist

Chris Caple, FSA, FIIC, is a British archaeologist and conservator, who specialises in the conservation of artefacts. He was a senior lecturer/associate professor at Durham University and was director of their postgraduate programme in artefact conservation. Upon his retirement in 2018, he was appointed Emeritus Reader in Archaeological Conservation.

Involved in archaeological excavations from the age of 14, Caple holds degrees from the University of Wales and the University of Bradford. He has worked as a conservator at York Castle Museum and in 1988 was appointed as director of Durham University's artefact conservation postgraduate programme. In 2002 he was elected a Fellow of the Society of Antiquaries.

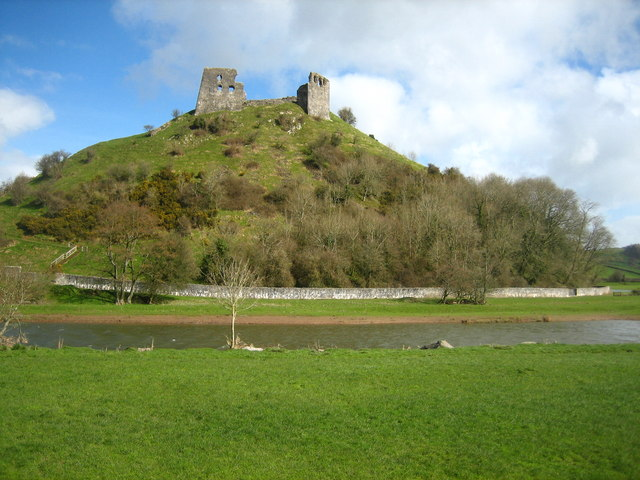
The excavations at Dryslwyn Castle in the 1980s and 1990s were written up in a monograph published by the Society for Medieval Archaeology.

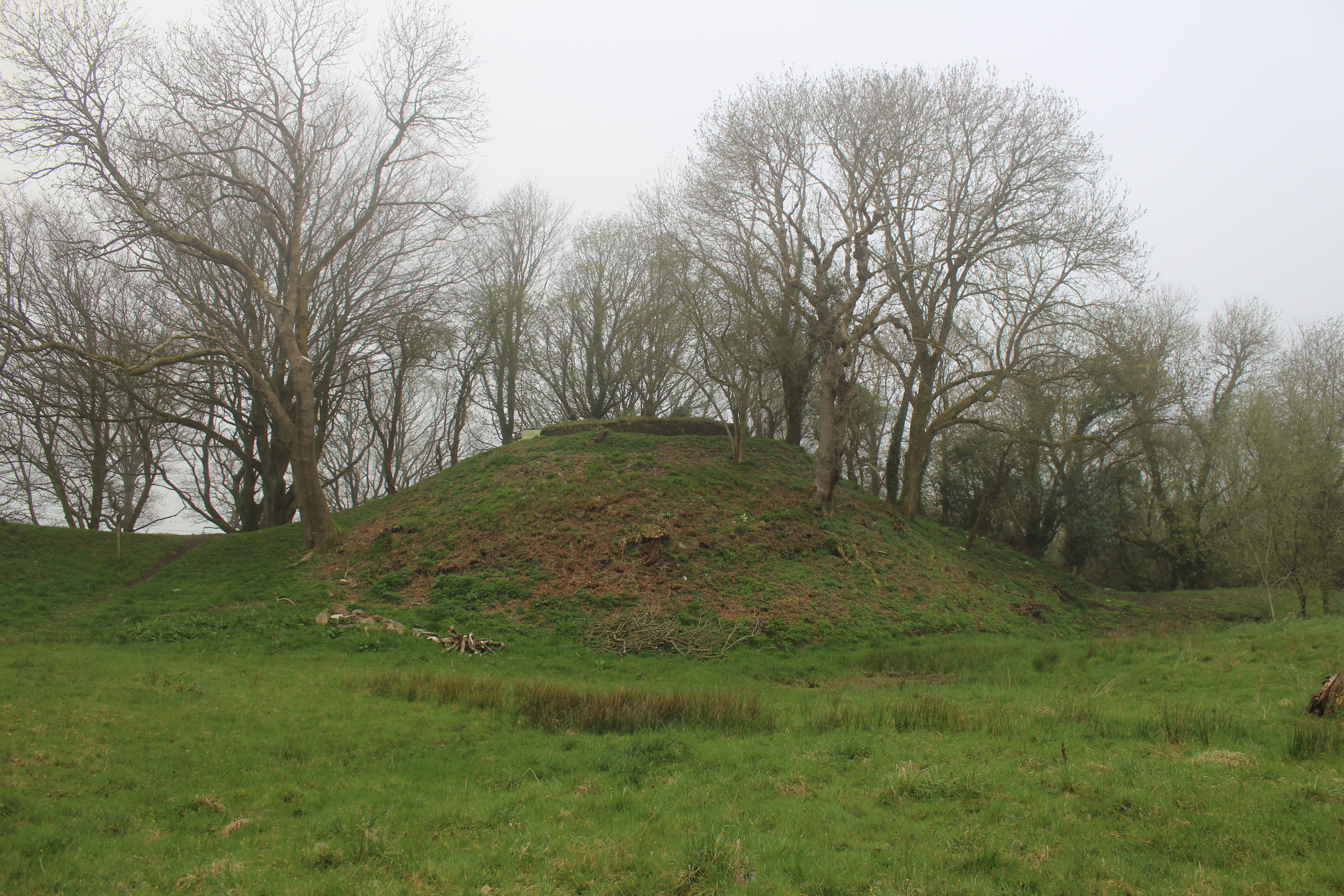
Nevern Castle

Caple directed excavations at Dryslwyn Castle between 1984 and 1995 and at Nevern Castle between 2008 and 2018. He retired from Durham University. He has written multiple books and papers on archaeology.

== Early life and education ==
Involved in the excavation of archaeological sites since the age of 14, Caple graduated from Cardiff College of the University of Wales in 1979, with a Bachelor of Science degree in archaeological conservation. In 1986 he received a Ph.D. from the University of Bradford, for researching the composition and manufacturing of medieval copper alloy pins.

== Career ==
Caple has been an excavating archaeologist for 34 years, an archaeological conservator for 32, and a lecturer in the latter subject for 20 years. From 1984, while still a student, to 1988, he worked at the York Castle Museum as the artefacts conservator, after which he took a post at Durham University's department of archaeology as a lecturer in archaeological conservation and archaeological science; in 1988 he also became the director of the university's artefact conservation postgraduate programme.

Caple has authored two books: Conservation Skills: Judgement, Method and Decision Making in 2000, and Objects: Reluctant Witnesses to the Past in 2006. Both are used as textbooks in courses on conservation, and museum studies. Conservation Skills was reviewed as a broad assessment of the conservation field, and as a "well-balanced" book that "achieves a detached approach without preaching to the audience", using case studies to illustrate the underlying issues of, and philosophy of approach to, conservation. A case study on the "re-reconstruction" of the Sutton Hoo helmet, which became an icon of Anglo-Saxon England after it was reconstructed by Herbert Maryon in the 1940s, yet was then reconstructed again by Nigel Williams in the 1970s, focuses on the concepts of reversibility and truthfulness.

== Publications ==
- Caple, Chris (2000). Conservation Skills: Judgement, Method and Decision Making. Abingdon: Routledge. ISBN 0-415-18880-6.
- Caple, Chris (2006). Objects: Reluctant Witnesses to the Past. Abingdon: Routledge. ISBN 0-415-30589-6.
- Caple, Chris (2007). Dryslwyn Castle Excavations 1980-1995. Society for Medieval Archaeology. ISBN 9781905981885.

== Bibliography ==
- "Dr Chris Caple". Centre for the Ethics of Cultural Heritage. Durham University. Archived from the original on 29 March 2018.
- "Dr Chris Caple, BSc, PhD, ACR, FIIC, FSA". Department of Archaeology. Durham University. Archived from the original on 23 July 2019.
- Dreghorn, Brenda (April 2002). "Review: Conservation Skills: Judgement, Method and Decision Making". Journal of the Society of Archivists. 23 (1). Society of Archivists: 118–119. doi:10.1080/00379810220120636. S2CID 220463247.
- Kolb, Charles C. (May 2001). "Review: Conservation Skills: Judgement, Method and Decision Making". Choice Reviews. 38 (9): 38–5089. doi:10.5860/CHOICE.38-5089 (inactive 1 July 2025).
- Rhyne, Charles S. (2002). "Review: Conservation Skills: Judgement, Method and Decision Making". Conservation and Management of Archaeological Sites. 5 (3): 185–187.
- Scott, David A. (2003). "Review: Conservation Skills: Judgement, Method and Decision Making". Studies in Conservation. 48 (4). International Institute for Conservation of Historic and Artistic Works: 283–284. JSTOR 1506919.
