= History of Technology (book series) =

History of Technology is a book series publishing annual volumes since 1976, covering the history of technology in different countries and time periods. The first seven volumes of the series were edited by A. Rupert Hall and Norman Smith. Volumes 8 through 11 were edited by Norman Smith. Volumes 12 through 18 were edited by Graham Hollister-Short and Frank James. Volumes 19 through 22 were edited by Graham Hollister-Short. Volume 30 was edited by Ian Inkster and Angel Calvo. Volumes 23 through 29, and 31 through 34 were edited by Ian Inkster. The entire book series is available for purchase on Bloomsbury’s website. The books were originally published by Bloomsbury Publishing, then for some time they were published by Continuum International Publishing Group. The series is now published under Bloomsbury Academic. It have been edited by Ian Inkster since 2002.

== See also ==
- History of science and technology
