= Mapping the Practice and Profession of Sculpture in Britain and Ireland 1851–1951 =

Online database of sculpture and artists

Mapping the Practice and Profession of Sculpture in Britain and Ireland 1851–1951 (Mapping Sculpture) is an online database of sculptors and their works. It is the result of a three-year research programme, funded by the Arts and Humanities Research Council and the British Academy. The project was a partnership between University of Glasgow, the Victoria and Albert Museum and the Henry Moore Institute, with systems development being carried out by the Humanities Advanced Technology and Information Institute.

The project represents the first authoritative study of sculptors, related businesses and trades, art infrastructures, professional networks and cultural geographies, between the Great Exhibition of 1851, and the Festival of Britain in 1951. The database contains over 50,000 records about sculptural practice.

Mapping Sculpture was originated by Ann Compton (Institute of Art History, University of Glasgow), who served as Project Director and Editor, with Professor Alison Yarrington (University of Glasgow, now University of Hull) as Principal Investigator and Dr Marjorie Trusted (Victoria and Albert Museum) as Co-Investigator. HATII's Matthew Barr was the Systems Developer.

A special issue of the Sculpture Journal, devoted to the Mapping Sculpture project, was published in December 2012.
