= Archives of Asian Art =

American art journal

- Discipline: Art
- Language: English
- Edited by: Sarah E. Fraser

Publication details
- Former name: Archives of the Chinese Art Society of America
- History: 1945–present
- Publisher: Duke University Press on behalf of the Asia Society (United States)
- Frequency: 2 issues annually

Standard abbreviations
- ISO 4: Arch. Asian Art

Indexing
- ISSN: 0066-6637 (print); 1944-6497 (web)
- JSTOR: 00666637

Links
- Journal homepage; Online access at Project MUSE

Archives of Asian Art is an academic journal covering the arts of South, Southeast, Central, and East Asia. Each issue contains articles by scholars of art and a selection of outstanding works of Asian art acquired by North American museums during the previous year.

The journal was established in 1945 as the Archives of the Chinese Art Society of America. It obtained its current title with volume 20 in 1966. The journal is owned by the Asia Society, which in 2007 changed its publisher from Brepols to the University of Hawaii Press. It is now published by Duke University Press.

Volumes 1–55 (1945–2005) are available on JSTOR; recent volumes are available on Project MUSE.

== Abstracting and indexing ==
The journal is abstracted and indexed in:

- Arts & Humanities Citation Index (AHCI)
- Current Contents Arts & Humanities
- Scopus
