= Peter van Geersdaele =

English conservator (1933–2018)

Peter van Geersdaele OBE
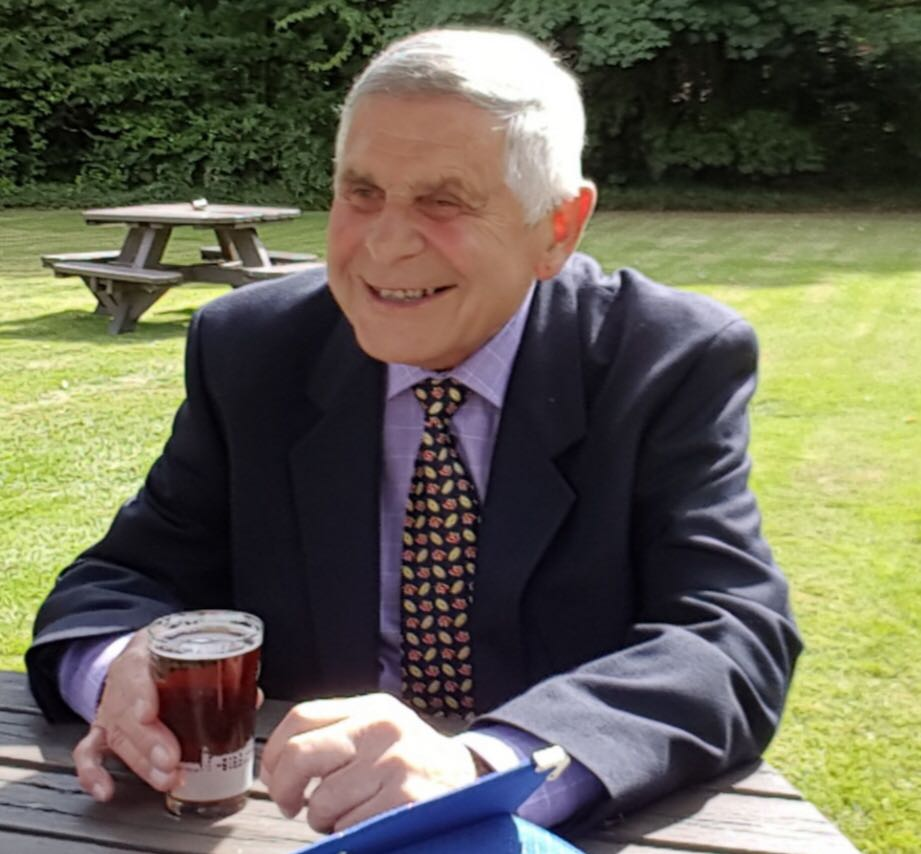
- Born: Peter Charles van Geersdaele; 3 July 1933; London, England
- Died: 20 July 2018 (aged 85)
- Occupation: Conservator
- Years active: 1949–1993
- Known for: Work on the Sutton Hoo ship-burial
- Spouse: Maura Bradley (m. 1955)

Peter Charles van Geersdaele OBE (3 July 1933 – 20 July 2018) was an English conservator best known for his work on the Sutton Hoo ship-burial. Among other work he oversaw the creation of a plaster cast of the ship impression, from which a fibreglass replica of the ship was formed. He later helped mould an impression of the Graveney boat, in addition to other excavation and restoration work.

Van Geersdaele studied at Hammersmith Technical College from 1946 to 1949, after which he engaged in moulding and casting at the Victoria and Albert Museum until 1951. From 1954 to around 1976 he was a conservator at the British Museum, rising to the position of senior conservation officer in the British and Medieval department. Following that he became an assistant chief of archaeology in the conservation division of the National Historic Sites of Canada for Parks Canada, and then the deputy head of the conservation department at the National Maritime Museum in London. He retired in 1993, and during that year's Birthday Honours was appointed an Officer of the Order of the British Empire, in recognition of his services to museums.

== Early life and education ==
Peter Charles van Geersdaele was born on 3 July 1933 in Fulham, South West London, to a family with roots in the Netherlands. He studied between 1946 and 1949 at Hammersmith Technical College, where he became a member of the cast department of the Victoria and Albert Museum from 1949 to 1951.

In the early 1950s van Geersdaele served in the Royal Air Force. While stationed at RAF Binbrook, in Lincolnshire, he played football for Grimsby Town F.C., managed by Bill Shankly. According to a later colleague, van Geersdaele "toyed with being a professional footballer" after his discharge, and had a trial with Queens Park Rangers F.C. Instead, in 1954 he joined the British Museum.

== British Museum ==
From 1954 to 1976 van Geersdaele worked at the British Museum. He began in the moulders' shop, creating replicas of classical sculpture, and rose to become a senior conservation officer in the British and Medieval department. There he notably led the team tasked with making a mould, and later a fibreglass replica, of the Sutton Hoo ship, a process he repeated in October 1970 with the Graveney boat. Other work at the museum included the 1964 removal of a thirteenth-century tile kiln from Clarendon Palace, a project in which, as with the Sutton Hoo ship, he was assisted by Nigel Williams, and the 1973 restoration of fourteenth-century wallpaintings from St Stephen's Chapel in Westminster Palace. He also helped with excavations of the Longton Hall porcelain factory and the Broadstairs Anglo-Saxon cemetery. During his time at the museum he also studied part-time towards a conservation diploma at University College London's Institute of Archaeology, which helped equip him to publish several articles on his work.

=== Sutton Hoo ship-burial ===
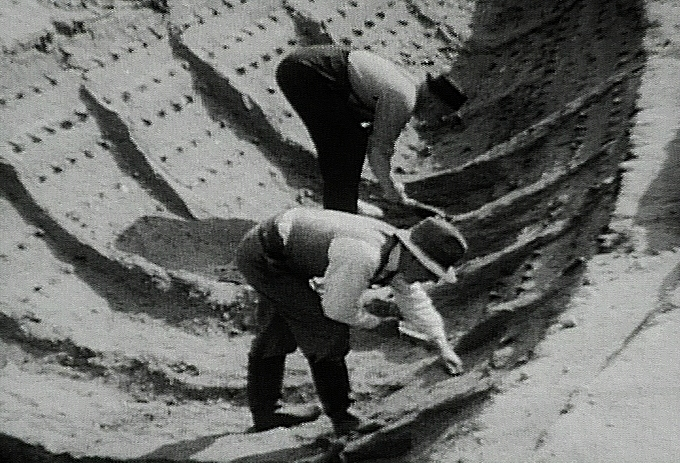
The ship impression during the 1939 excavation

During the 1967 re-excavation of the Sutton Hoo ship-burial, van Geersdaele undertook moulding an impression of the ship. Initially excavated in 1939, the Anglo-Saxon burial is widely identified with Rædwald of East Anglia. After the 1939 dig the ship impression was filled in with bracken, which had gradually decayed and mixed in with the sandy soil to preserve the traces of the ship. When the site was again excavated in 1965, the impression, which excavation leader Rupert Bruce-Mitford termed "the ghost of the ship", was shown to have largely survived the preceding 26 years with minimal damage. The need to excavate beneath the ship, and to remove the ship's rivets for study, necessitated the destruction of the impression; to mitigate the damage, it was decided to make a plaster cast first, and to use this to make a fibreglass replica.

The making of the plaster cast took three weeks. Van Geersdaele led the operation, with help from Jack Langhorn, senior technician at the British Museum's plasterers' shop, A. Prescott, Nigel Williams, G. Adamson, Y. Crossman, and G. Joysmith. Plaster of Paris was used for its fast setting time and cost efficiency, and five experiments were conducted to find an appropriate method. In the first experiment, using soil dumps from the excavation, plaster was applied directly to earth, but when removed pulled the earth away with it. Two attempts to chemically consolidate the surface were then unsuccessfully tried, before an attempt was made to lay polyethylene directly over the impression to act as a barrier. This produced too many wrinkles, and so in a final, successful, experiment, wet paper towels were instead used as barriers. The method was repeated across the entire ship. The ship was moulded in 85 sections, and weighed an estimated 6,100 kilograms (13,400 lb).

Following the moulding of the ship impression, a fibreglass cast was made in 23 sections. The mould was first assembled upside down; the joins were then filled in with plaster, and a light coat was applied to the rest of the mould to remove any wrinkles caused by the paper towel barrier. The plaster was then sealed and coated with wax before casting. The casting process itself took three weeks, two sections being cast each day. The cast was removed and reassembled, supported on a wooden frame with eighty legs.

=== Graveney boat ===
Van Geersdaele was asked in 1970 to take an impression of a clinker-built wooden boat, when the widening of a watercourse near the village of Graveney in Kent unearthed the ninth century vessel. Its ribs were lifted so that a plaster mould of the hull could be taken, in a similar method to that employed on the Sutton Hoo ship; here however the ship was removed and conserved after the mould was taken, the mould serving to help with the ship's reassembly. Nineteen plaster sections were laid over three and a half days, and then lifted in less than an hour.

== Later career ==
In 1976 van Geersdaele moved to Ottawa with his wife and younger daughter, where he took on the role of Assistant Chief of Conservation (Archaeology) for Parks Canada's National Historic Sites of Canada. Four years later the family moved back to England, and van Geersdaele became the National Maritime Museum's deputy head of conservation. Van Geersdale was responsible for the movement and installation of exhibits, and oversaw a major reorganisation of the storage of the reserve collections. He retired in 1993.

== Personal life ==
Van Geersdaele married Maura Bradley in 1955, and had two daughters, Maxine and Sharon, as well as grandchildren and great-grandchildren. After returning to England in 1976, he lived in Woodbridge, Suffolk: "a stone's throw from the site of his triumph at Sutton Hoo", as a British Museum colleague termed it. During the 1993 Birthday Honours van Geersdaele was appointed an Officer of the Order of the British Empire, in recognition of his services to museums.

In 2003 van Geersdaele was part of a group of pensioners who protested against an 18 percent raise in Council Tax by Suffolk County Council, and the following year was summoned to court for spreading out the tax increase across twelve monthly installments rather than the required ten. As late as 2006, van Geersdaele, as part of the Protest Against Council Tax Suffolk (PACTS) committee, continued protesting inefficiencies in the Council Tax collection system.

Van Geersdaele died on 20 July 2018. He was remembered by a colleague, Andrew Oddy, as "a natural-born leader who was universally liked and who inspired those who worked with him to give of their best", and as among "the last of the team of conservators and specialist craftsmen who responded to a challenge that had left archaeologists daunted".

== Bibliography ==
- Bruce-Mitford, Rupert (1974). Aspects of Anglo-Saxon Archaeology: Sutton Hoo and Other Discoveries. London: Victor Gollancz Limited. ISBN 0-575-01704-X.
- Bruce-Mitford, Rupert (1975). The Sutton Hoo Ship-Burial, Volume 1: Excavations, Background, the Ship, Dating and Inventory. London: British Museum Publications. ISBN 0-7141-1334-4.
- "Council tax collection costs shock". East Anglian Daily Times. Ipswich. 11 February 2006.
- Gooderham, Dave (4 September 2003). "Angry scenes at Counil [sic] Tax protest". East Anglian Daily Times. Ipswich. Archived from the original on 12 January 2026.
- "kiln; floor-tile". The British Museum Collection Online. The British Museum.
- Maslin, Nigel (July 2014). "Two Anniversaries and a Centenary". Saxon (59): 6–7. Archived (PDF) from the original on 26 March 2017.
- Painter, Kenneth (1993). "Nigel Williams (1944–1992)". Journal of Glass Studies. 35. Corning Museum of Glass: 158–159. JSTOR 24191075.
- Oddy, Andrew (4 January 2019). "Peter Van Geersdaele, FIIC: a pioneer in the three-dimensional recording of archaeological structures". International Institute for Conservation. Archived from the original on 26 March 2019.
- "Peter Charles van Geersdaele OBE". Family Notices 24. Archant. 2018. Archived from the original on 25 August 2018.
- "Peter Van Geersdaele, Made a Plaster Cast of Sutton Hoo Ship". Obituaries. The Daily Telegraph. London. 24 August 2018. Archived from the original on 12 January 2026.
- "Retired museum expert prepares for court". Ipswich Star. Ipswich. 11 February 2004. Archived from the original on 12 January 2026.
- "Supplement" (PDF). The London Gazette. No. 53332. 12 June 1993. p. B13. Archived (PDF) from the original on 12 January 2026.
- "Tax Fight Pensioner Battles On". Ipswich Star. Ipswich. 17 February 2004. Archived from the original on 12 January 2026.

=== Works by van Geersdaele ===
- van Geersdaele, Peter C. (November 1969). "Moulding the Impression of the Sutton Hoo Ship". Studies in Conservation. 14 (4). International Institute for Conservation of Historic and Artistic Work: 177–182. doi:10.1179/sic.1969.021. JSTOR 1505343.
- van Geersdaele, Peter C. (August 1970). "Making the Fibre Glass Replica of the Sutton Hoo Ship Impression". Studies in Conservation. 15 (3). International Institute for Conservation of Historic and Artistic Work: 215–220. doi:10.2307/1505584. JSTOR 1505584.
- Oddy, William Andrew & van Geersdaele, Peter C. (February 1972). "The Recovery of the Graveney Boat". Studies in Conservation. 17 (1). International Institute for Conservation of Historic and Artistic Work: 30–38. doi:10.1179/sic.1972.003. JSTOR 1505559.
- Eames, Elizabeth S. & van Geersdaele, Peter C. (1972). "Further Notes on a Thirteenth-Century Tiled Pavement From the King's Chapel, Clarendon Palace". Journal of the British Archaeological Association. 35 (1). British Archaeological Association: 71–76. doi:10.1080/00681288.1972.11894924.
- van Geersdaele, Peter C. (February 1975). "Note on the Direct Application of Plaster of Paris to Waterlogged Wood". Studies in Conservation. 20 (1). International Institute for Conservation of Historic and Artistic Work: 35. doi:10.1179/sic.1975.20.1.005. JSTOR 1505598.
- van Geersdaele, Peter C. & Davison, Sandra (August 1975). "The Thirteenth-Century Tile-Kiln from Clarendon Place: Its Removal and Reconstruction for Exhibition". Studies in Conservation. 20 (3). International Institute for Conservation of Historic and Artistic Work: 158–168. doi:10.1179/sic.1975.20.3.014. JSTOR 1505681.
- van Geersdaele, Peter C. (November 1976). "A Design for Large Plaster Piece-Moulds Made in the Field". Studies in Conservation. 21 (4). International Institute for Conservation of Historic and Artistic Work: 198–201. doi:10.1179/sic.1976.031. JSTOR 1505644.
- van Geersdaele, Peter C. & Goldsworthy, Lesley J. (1978). "The Restoration of Wallpainting Fragments from St. Stephen's Chapel, Westminster". The Conservator. 2 (1). Institute of Conservation: 9–12. doi:10.1080/01400096.1978.9635646.
- Oddy, William Andrew & van Geersdaele, Peter C. (1978). "Lifting and Removal". In Fenwick, Valerie (ed.). The Graveney Boat: A Tenth Century Find from Kent. Oxford: British Archaeological Reports. pp. 17–21. ISBN 978-0-86054-030-4.
- van Geersdaele, Peter C. (1987). "Molding in the Field Using Plaster of Paris". In Hodges, Henry W. M. (ed.). In Situ Archaeological Conservation: Proceedings of Meetings April 6–13, 1986, Mexico. Los Angeles: Getty Conservation Institute. pp. 114–121. ISBN 0-941103-03-X.
- van Geersdaele, Peter C. (1993). "Moldeado con yeso en el campo". In Hodges, Henry W. M. (ed.). Conservación Arqueológica in Situ: Memoria de las Reuniones 6–13 de Abril de 1986, México (in Spanish). Mexico City: Instituto Nacional de Antropología e Historia. pp. 120–127. ISBN 0-89236-251-0.
