= Nigel Williams (conservator) =

British conservator and expert on the restoration of ceramics and glass (1944–1992)

- Nigel Williams with his restoration of the Portland Vase, copying a pose struck by the original restorer, John Doubleday; an 1845 watercolour by Thomas H. Shepherd shows the shattered fragments.
- Born: Nigel Reuben Rook Williams; 15 July 1944; Surrey, England
- Died: 21 April 1992 (aged 47); Aqaba, Jordan
- Occupation: Conservator
- Years active: 1961–1992
- Known for: Reconstructing the Sutton Hoo helmet and the Portland Vase

Nigel Reuben Rook Williams (15 July 1944 – 21 April 1992) was an English conservator and expert on the restoration of ceramics and glass. From 1961 until his death he worked at the British Museum, where he became the Chief Conservator of Ceramics and Glass in 1983. There his work included the successful restorations of the Sutton Hoo helmet and the Portland Vase.

Joining as an assistant at age 16, Williams spent his entire career, and most of his life, at the British Museum. He was one of the first people to study conservation, not yet recognised as a profession, and from an early age was given responsibility over high-profile objects. In the 1960s he assisted with the re-excavation of the Sutton Hoo ship-burial, and in his early- to mid-twenties he conserved many of the objects found therein: most notably the Sutton Hoo helmet, which occupied a year of his time. He likewise reconstructed other objects from the find, including the shield, drinking horns, and maplewood bottles.

The "abiding passion of his life" was ceramics, and the 1970s and 1980s gave Williams ample opportunities in that field. After nearly 31,000 fragments of shattered Greek vases were found in 1974 amidst the wreck of HMS Colossus, Williams set to work piecing them together. The process was televised, and turned him into a television personality. A decade later, in 1988 and 1989, Williams's crowning achievement came when he took to pieces the Portland Vase, one of the most famous glass objects in the world, and put it back together. The reconstruction was again televised for a BBC programme, and as with the Sutton Hoo helmet, took nearly a year to complete.

Williams died at age 47 of a heart attack while in Aqaba, Jordan, where he was working on a British Museum excavation. The Ceramics & Glass group of the Institute of Conservation awards a biennial prize in his honour, recognising his significant contributions in the field of conservation.

== Early years ==
Nigel Williams was born on 15 July 1944 in Surrey, England. His early schooling was interrupted by rheumatic fever and slowed by dyslexia, yet he went on to study silversmithing and metal design at the Central School of Arts and Crafts. There he excelled. The school recommended him to the British Museum, which recruited him in 1961 to work as an assistant for the Department of British and Medieval Antiquities. Conservation was not a recognized profession at the time, and Williams became only the second member of the museum to study the field in a three-year part-time course at University College London's Institute of Archaeology.

== At the British Museum ==
After joining the British Museum in 1961 and studying conservation, Williams worked on a wide variety of antiquities. He conserved metals (including clocks and watches), glass, stone, ivory, wood, and various other organic materials, yet more than anything he worked with ceramics, which became "the abiding passion of his life." Williams also proved skillful at working with archaeological finds; among other tasks he saw to the lifting from the earth of a medieval tile kiln and a Roman mosaic—likely the Hinton St Mary Mosaic, thought to be one of the earliest known depictions of Christ. His most significant work came at the beginning and the end of his professional life, with his reconstructions of the Sutton Hoo helmet and the Portland Vase. Between these achievements Williams also pieced together the nearly 31,000 fragments of Greek vases found in the wreck of HMS Colossus (1787), and in 1983 was promoted to Chief Conservator of Ceramics and Glass, a position he held until his death.

=== Sutton Hoo ===
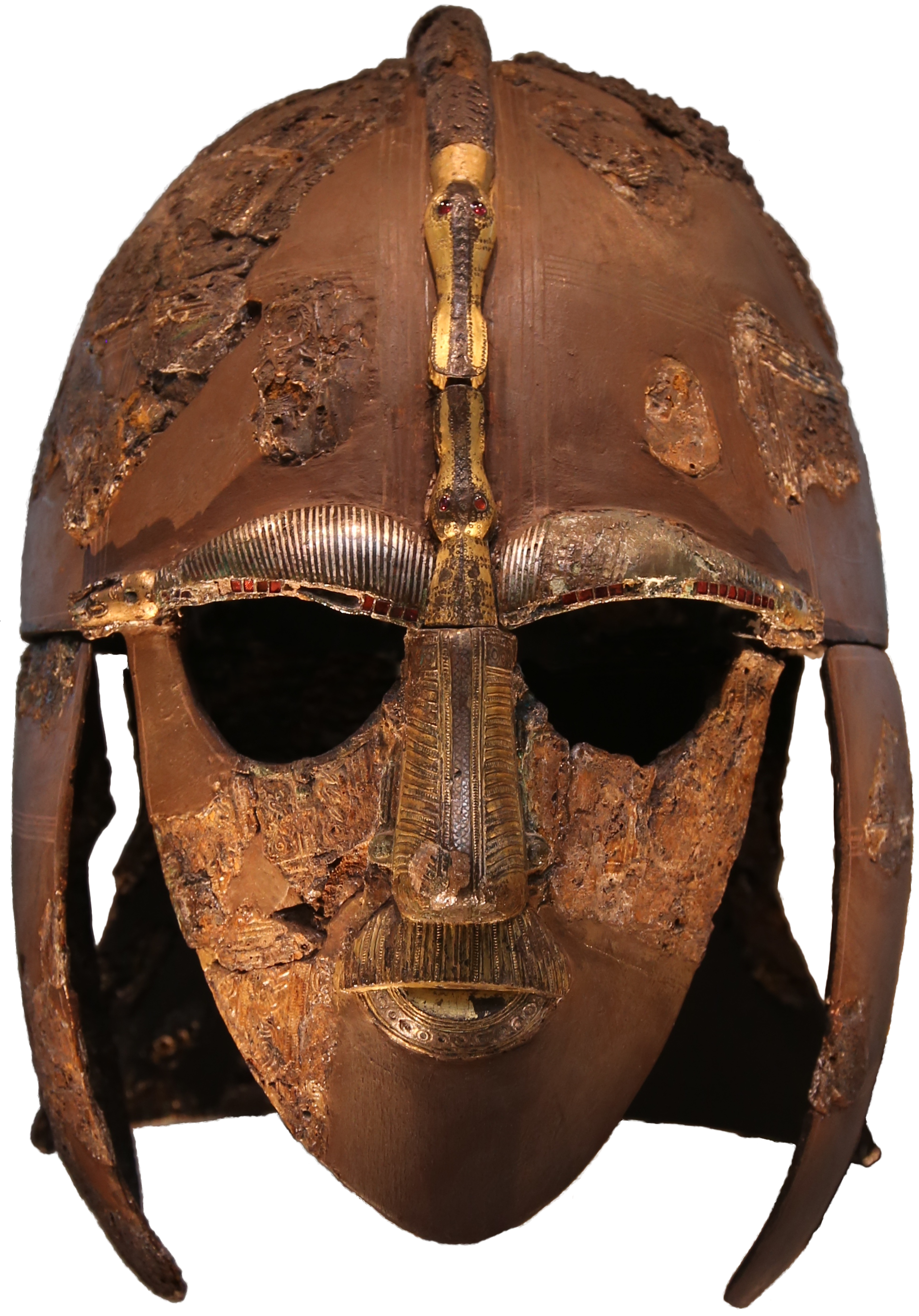
The Sutton Hoo helmet

The first major success for Williams came during the re-excavation of the Sutton Hoo ship-burial from 1965–1970. In 1966 he was appointed the conservator of the Sutton Hoo finds, and in the summer of 1967 he helped with the moulding of the ship impression. The following summer the casts were reassembled in a warehouse and a fibreglass replica made. The process was more dangerous than was then known, and left Williams allergic to styrene for the rest of his life.

In 1968, as the re-excavation at Sutton Hoo reached its conclusion and with problems apparent in the reconstructions of several of the finds, Williams was put in charge of a team tasked with their continued conservation. In this capacity he conserved many of the objects, chiefly among them the helmet, shield, drinking horns, maplewood bottles, tubs, and buckets. Williams's colleagues at the museum termed the Sutton Hoo helmet his "pièce de résistance"; the iconic artefact from England's most famous archaeological discovery, it had previously been restored in 1945–1946 by Herbert Maryon. Williams took this reconstruction to pieces, and from 1970 to 1971 spent eighteen months of time and a full year of work rearranging the more than 500 fragments. No photographs of the fragments in situ had been taken during the original excavation in 1939, nor were their relative positions recorded. As Rupert Bruce-Mitford, who oversaw the work, put it, the task for Williams "was thus reduced to a jigsaw puzzle without any sort of picture on the lid of the box", and, "as it proved, a great many of the pieces missing": fitting for Williams, who did jigsaw puzzles to relax. Unveiled on 2 November 1971, the new reconstruction was met with universal acclaim. It was published the following year by Bruce-Mitford, and posthumously by Williams in 1992.

=== HMS Colossus ===
In a precursor to the work he would do on the Portland Vase, the 1970s saw Nigel Williams reconstructing fragments of smashed Greek vases. The 1798 sinking of HMS Colossus had taken with it part of Sir William Hamilton's second vase collection, where it lay in pieces for the next 200 years. A salvage operation following the wreck's 1974 discovery unearthed some 30,935 fragments, and when they were acquired by the British Museum, Williams set to work reconstructing them. This endeavour was aided by eighteenth century drawings of the vases by Tischbein, and shown on television, where the instinctive talent of Williams made him become a television personality. "He worked as if he were alone, and many people remember the moment in the resulting Chronicle programme when he uttered a four-letter word as one of his partially-completed restorations fell apart before the cameras." In 1978 Williams and his team restored seven vases, in whole or in part, for an exhibition at the museum in conjunction with the 11th International Congress of Classical Archaeology. The other vases generally did not have enough pieces remaining to allow for complete reconstructions, although ultimately 115 individual examples were identified.

=== Portland Vase ===
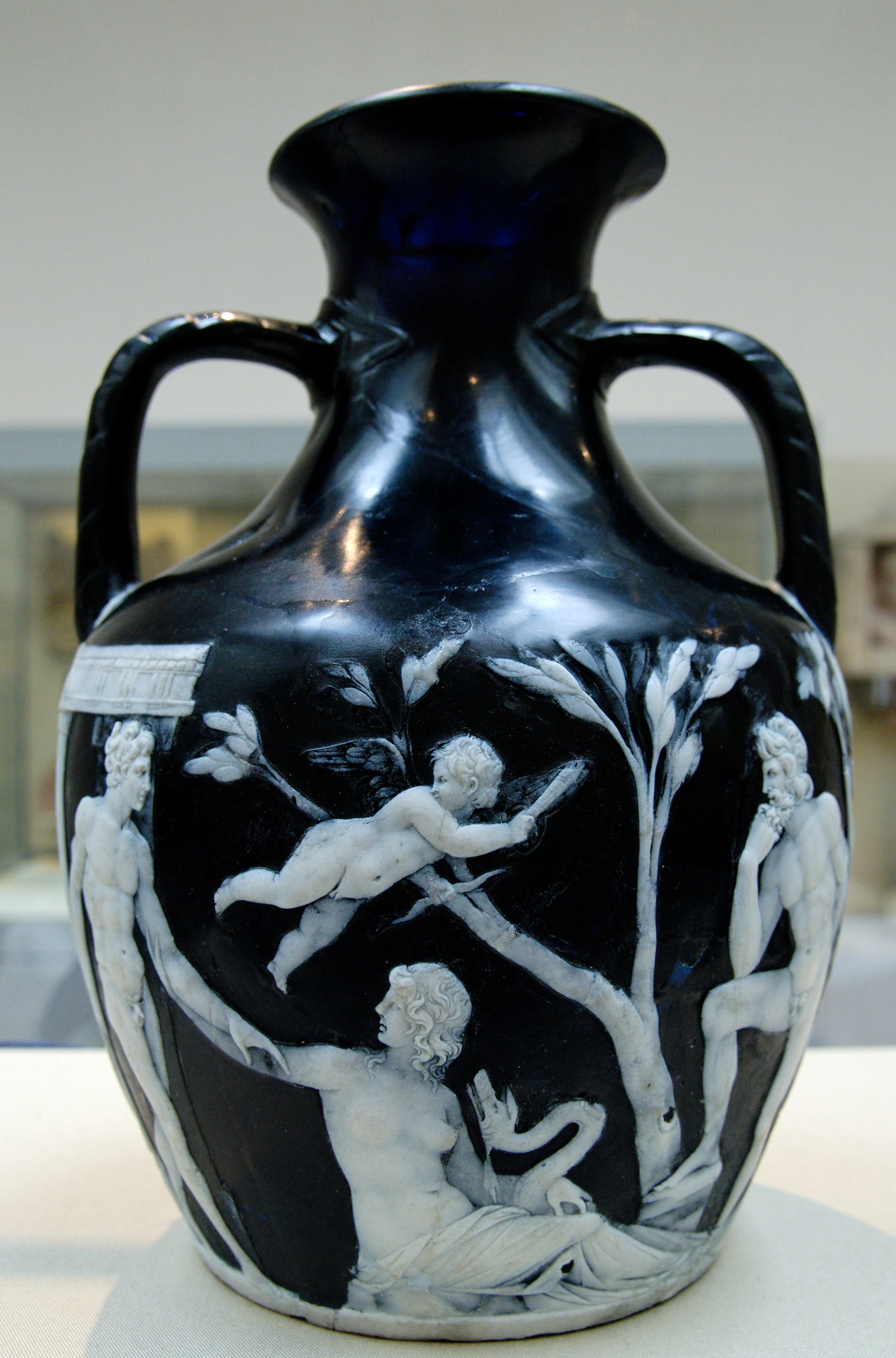
The Portland Vase

The crowning achievement to Williams's career, wrote his museum colleague Kenneth Painter, was his 1988–1989 restoration of the Portland Vase. Regarded as "probably the most famous glass object in the world" by the Journal of Glass Studies, the vase is "a masterpiece of Roman cameo glass". First recorded in 1600–1601, the vase is dated to around 30–20 B.C., or shortly afterward. It was placed on display in the British Museum in 1810, and then intentionally smashed in 1845 by a young man who admitted to "indulging in intemperance for a week before". It was restored the same year by John Doubleday, and then again in 1948–1949 by J. W. R. Axtell. By 1988 the adhesive used had yellowed and weakened, and Williams was tasked, alongside his assistant, Sandra Smith, with restoring the vase for a third time.

With the BBC's History and Archaeology Unit filming, Williams began the restoration of the vase in June 1988. He deconstructed the vase by wrapping it inside and out with blotting paper and letting it sit in a glass desiccator injected with solvents for three days, leaving it in 189 pieces. After removing the remnants of the old adhesive and cleaning the fragments, Williams used an epoxy adhesive, Hxtal NYL, in conjunction with an acrylic resin to join the pieces. Although they attempted to avoid so-called trap-outs, where the placing of a fragment prevents the next from fitting in, Williams and Smith left for Christmas in 1988 fearing that they might have to take apart six months' work in order to fit in the last few shards. These fears proved unfounded: a few more weeks spent working on the top half of the vase, and the final pieces joined perfectly. At the end of nine months' work, only 17 minuscule fragments remained unplaced, rather than the 34 that were omitted from the previous restoration. After filling in the cracks with coloured resin, Williams gave his verdict: "It's OK... ruined my Christmas."

== Personal life ==
For 20 years Williams lived with his partner Myrtle Bruce-Mitford, a professional cellist and the daughter of his colleague Rupert Bruce-Mitford. The two met in 1964. She likewise contributed to the Sutton Hoo finds, being employed by the British Museum to work on the remnants of the lyre and co-authoring a paper with her father. She additionally revised and published the second edition of Williams's text Porcelain: Repair and Restoration, on which he had been working at the time of his death. Williams and Bruce-Mitford had a daughter, Matty, who was born in 1976 or 1977.

== Death and legacy ==
Nigel Williams died of a heart attack on 21 April 1992, at the age of 47. He had recently arrived in Aqaba, Jordan, and was taking a break on the beach from his work as the on-site conservator for a British Museum excavation at Tell es-Sa'idiyeh. Though his death came early, Williams, as Painter wrote, "made a great contribution to the art and science of conservation, to the archaeological record and to the preservation of great collections, and above all to the public's appreciation and understanding of the past."

The Ceramics & Glass group of the Institute of Conservation awards the biennial Nigel Williams Prize both in memory of his work, and in encouragement of high standards for those in the conservation profession. Noting the dramatic highlights of Williams's career, and "that for most conservators today the opportunities to conserve or restore high-profile objects such as the Portland Vase are rare", the Institute awards the prize "as much in a spirit of encouragement as in that of healthy competition, recognising the value of consistent and day-to-day professional practice." The three-member judging panel is headed by Sandra Smith, who restored the Portland Vase with Williams while at the British Museum; along with the £1,000 awarded to the winner comes a "virtual" image of a gilded replica of the vase, the original copy of which was donated by Wedgwood and is still kept in their museum.

== Bibliography ==
- Biddle, Martin (3 December 2015). "Rupert Leo Scott Bruce-Mitford: 1914–1994" (PDF). Biographical Memoirs of Fellows of the British Academy. XIV. British Academy: 58–86.
- Bruce-Mitford, Rupert & Bruce-Mitford, Myrtle (March 1970). "The Sutton Hoo Lyre, Beowulf, and the Origins of the Frame Harp". Antiquity. XLIV (173): 7–13. doi:10.1017/S0003598X00040916.
- Bruce-Mitford, Rupert (Autumn 1972). "The Sutton Hoo Helmet: A New Reconstruction". The British Museum Quarterly. XXXVI (3–4). British Museum: 120–130. doi:10.2307/4423116. JSTOR 4423116.
- Bruce-Mitford, Rupert (1975). The Sutton Hoo Ship-Burial, Volume 1: Excavations, Background, the Ship, Dating and Inventory. London: British Museum Publications. ISBN 978-0-7141-1334-0.
- Bruce-Mitford, Rupert (1978). The Sutton Hoo Ship-Burial, Volume 2: Arms, Armour and Regalia. London: British Museum Publications. ISBN 978-0-7141-1331-9.
- Bruce-Mitford, Rupert (1979). The Sutton Hoo Ship-Burial: Reflections after thirty years. University of York Medieval Monograph Series. Vol. 2. York: William Sessions. ISBN 978-0-900657-46-7.
- "Foreword". Journal of Glass Studies. 32. Corning Museum of Glass: 12. 1990. JSTOR 24188027.
- Kennedy, Dominic (9 April 1992). "Take Two Girls". Daily Mail. No. 29800. London. pp. 29, 33.
- Maryon, Herbert (September 1947). "The Sutton Hoo Helmet". Antiquity. XXI (83): 137–144. doi:10.1017/S0003598X00016598. S2CID 163948719.
- Marzinzik, Sonja (2007). The Sutton Hoo Helmet. London: British Museum Press. ISBN 978-0-7141-2325-7.
- Maslin, Nigel (July 2011). "Benjamin Britten and other visitors" (PDF). Saxon (53): 6–7.
- "Nigel Williams Prize". The Institute of Conservation.
- Oddy, Andrew & Cook, Brian Francis (1989). "Preface". In Williams, Nigel (ed.). The Breaking and Remaking of the Portland Vase. London: British Museum Publications. p. 4. ISBN 978-0-7141-1291-6.
- Oddy, Andrew (25 April 1992). "Obituary: Nigel Williams". The Independent. London. p. 34.
- Oddy, Andrew & Bruce-Mitford, Rupert (1 May 1992). "Nigel Reuben Rook Williams, 1944–1992: Two Tributes". Unpublished.
- Oddy, Andrew (2002). "Foreword". In Williams, Nigel; Hogan, Loretta & Bruce-Mitford, Myrtle (eds.). Porcelain: Repair and Restoration (2nd ed.). Philadelphia: University of Pennsylvania Press. p. 6. ISBN 978-0-8122-3703-0.
- Painter, Kenneth (Autumn 1967). "The Roman Site at Hinton St. Mary, Dorset". The British Museum Quarterly. XXXII (1–2). British Museum: 15–31. doi:10.2307/4422986. JSTOR 4422986.
- Painter, Kenneth & Whitehouse, David (1990a). "The History of the Portland Vase". Journal of Glass Studies. 32. Corning Museum of Glass: 24–84. JSTOR 24188030.
- Painter, Kenneth & Whitehouse, David (1990b). "Style, Date, and Place of Manufacture". Journal of Glass Studies. 32. Corning Museum of Glass: 122–125. JSTOR 24188036.
- Painter, Kenneth (1993). "Nigel Williams (1944–1992)". Journal of Glass Studies. 35. Corning Museum of Glass: 158–159. JSTOR 24191075.
- Pile, Ronald (September 2010). "The Nigel Williams Prize" (PDF). Icon News (30). Institute of Conservation: 14. ISSN 1749-8988.
- "The Portland Vase". The British Museum Collection Online. The British Museum.
- "The Portland Vase Disc". The British Museum Collection Online. The British Museum.
- Richards, Julian D. (1992). "Anglo Saxon Symbolism". In Carver, Martin (ed.). The Age of Sutton Hoo: The seventh century in north-western Europe. Woodbridge: The Boydell Press. pp. 131–147.
- Smallwood, Valerie & Woodford, Susan (2003). Fragments from Sir William Hamilton's Second Collection of Vases Recovered from the Wreck of HMS Colossus. Corpus Vasorum Antiquorum: British Museum. Vol. 10. London: British Museum Press. ISBN 978-0-7141-2236-6.
- Swift, Rachel (January 2009). "Nigel Williams Prize 2008" (PDF). Icon News (20). Institute of Conservation: 15–16. ISSN 1749-8988.
- Tubb, Jonathan N. & Dorrell, Peter G. (1993). "Tell Es-Saidiyeh: Interim Report on the Sixth Season of Excavations". Palestine Exploration Quarterly. 125 (1). Palestine Exploration Fund: 50–74. doi:10.1179/peq.1993.125.1.50.
- van Geersdaele, Peter C. & Davison, Sandra (August 1975). "The Thirteenth-Century Tile-Kiln from Clarendon Place: Its Removal and Reconstruction for Exhibition". Studies in Conservation. 20 (3). International Institute for Conservation of Historic and Artistic Work: 158–168. doi:10.1179/sic.1975.20.3.014. JSTOR 1505681.
- White, Roland (23 June 1989). "Original Sinclair". Punch. No. 6766. London. p. 45.
- Woodford, Susan (Winter 2001). "Tischbein and the Fragments of Vases Recovered from HMS Colossus". Notes in the History of Art. XX (2). The University of Chicago Press: 1–7. JSTOR 23206797.

=== Works by Williams ===
- Williams, Nigel (1980). "Pottery restoration: An account of spinning technique used in the British Museum". The Conservator. 4 (1). Institute of Conservation: 34–37. doi:10.1080/01410096.1980.9994936.
- Williams, Nigel (1983). Porcelain: Repair and Restoration (1st ed.). London: British Museum Publications. ISBN 978-0-7141-8051-9.
- Williams, Nigel (1987). "The Conservation of a Large Clazomenæan Sarcophagus Lid". In Black, James (ed.). Recent Advances in the Conservation and Analysis of Artifacts. London: Summer Schools Press. pp. 87–91. ISBN 978-0-9512429-0-2.
- Williams, Nigel (1988). "Ancient Methods of Repairing Pottery and Porcelain". In Daniels, Vincent (ed.). Early Advances in Conservation. British Museum Occasional Paper. Vol. 65. London: British Museum. pp. 147–149.
- Williams, Nigel (1989). The Breaking and Remaking of the Portland Vase. London: British Museum Publications. ISBN 978-0-7141-1291-6.
- Williams, Nigel (1992). "The Sutton Hoo Helmet". In Oddy, William Andrew (ed.). The Art of the Conservator. London: British Museum Press. pp. 73–88. ISBN 978-0-7141-2056-0.
- Williams, Nigel; Hogan, Loretta & Bruce-Mitford, Myrtle (2002). Porcelain: Repair and Restoration (2nd ed.). Philadelphia: University of Pennsylvania Press. ISBN 978-0-8122-3703-0.
