= Elizabeth Eames =

English archaeologist and expert on medieval tiles

Elizabeth Eames

Elizabeth Sara Eames FSA (24 June 1918 – 20 September 2008) was a British archaeologist and scholar who specialised in the study of medieval tiles. Her expertise grew out of a job at the British Museum which involved cataloguing and conserving their collection of decorated English medieval floor tiles. She became an authority on this aspect of medieval archaeology and, as well as publishing books and articles, moved on to excavation of further tiles from pavements and kilns, and the study of medieval building techniques. She also taught in a variety of settings.

== Personal life and education ==
Elizabeth Sara Graham born in Northampton on 24 June 1918, she was the daughter of Eveline Lucy (née Garrett) and Arthur Frederick Graham, an industrial chemist. After attending Rugby High School she went to Newnham College, Cambridge in 1937 to read English. She changed to studying archaeology and anthropology with "Anglo-Saxon and kindred studies" directed by Professor Hector Munro Chadwick. Her work on a doctorate was interrupted by the war when she joined the Auxiliary Territorial Service (ATS) and served until 1946. After a year at the University of Oslo she was awarded a Cambridge MLitt for a thesis on women in Viking society. She married Herbert Wells Eames, a solicitor and local politician, in 1949. They had three children.

== Career ==
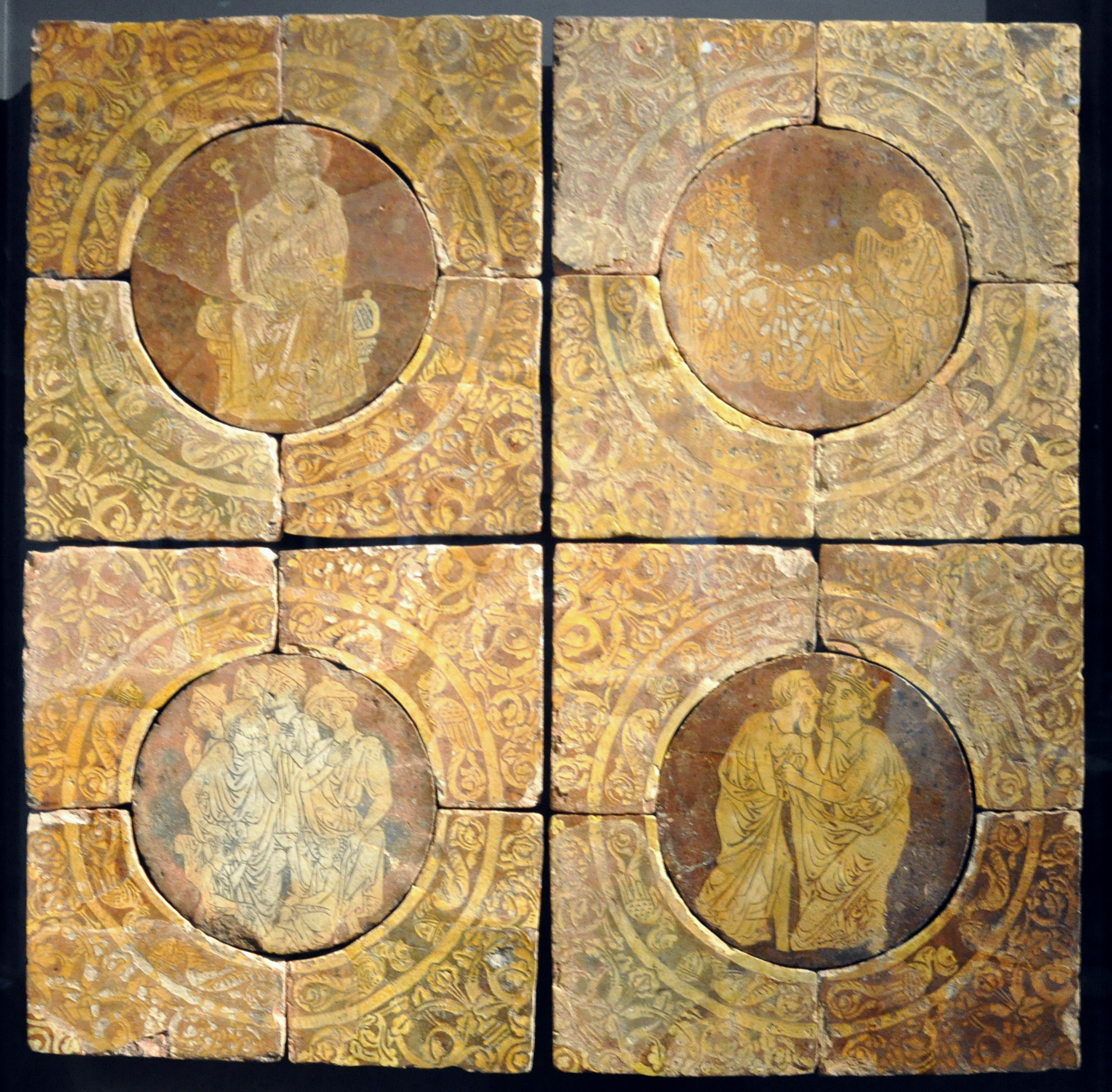
Unusual 13th century figurative tiles from Chertsey Abbey showing scenes from the story of Tristram, included in Eames' Catalogue.

After leaving the ATS Eames went to help at the British Museum in poor conditions resulting from bomb damage, at a time when much of the collection was being unpacked from wartime storage arrangements. She was given the task of sorting through thousands of tiles including 9000 from the Duke of Rutland collection. Many tiles had suffered from damp and needed conservation work before being catalogued and properly stored. There had been little scholarly study of tiles before this, and Eames "made this neglected subject her career". She excavated and acquired further tiles, studied the diverse and extensive collection, and "established a thorough academic approach" which eventually resulted in her definitive Catalogue of Medieval Lead-Glazed tiles in the Department of Medieval and Later Antiquities in the British Museum. This consists of two volumes discussing and illustrating 13,882 tiles in meticulous detail, the oldest from the late Anglo-Saxon period and the most recent from the sixteenth century. This work is far from being a simple catalogue and is founded on Eames' "understanding of the medieval craft and its place in medieval economic and art history".

She directed excavations of tile pavements and kiln sites. These included North Grange, Meaux Abbey (1957–58), Clarendon Palace, Salisbury, in the early 1960s, Ramsey Abbey, Cambridgeshire (1967–68) and Haverholme Priory, Lincolnshire, in 1970. At Clarendon she organised the lifting of two pavements and a 13th-century kiln previously uncovered by Tancred Borenius and had them transported to the museum where, a few years later, she created a new gallery for pavements and kilns. In 1978 she was given an MBE. Eames retired from the British Museum in 1980, having completed and published her major work.

She enjoyed her contacts with continental European scholars, and was well respected abroad. A 1983 London conference recognising Eames' achievements was attended by fellow scholars from several countries and there are Danish and German catalogues modelled on hers, like Eleonore Landgraf's Ornamentierte Bodenfliesen des Mittelalters in Süd- und Westdeutschland 1150-1550.

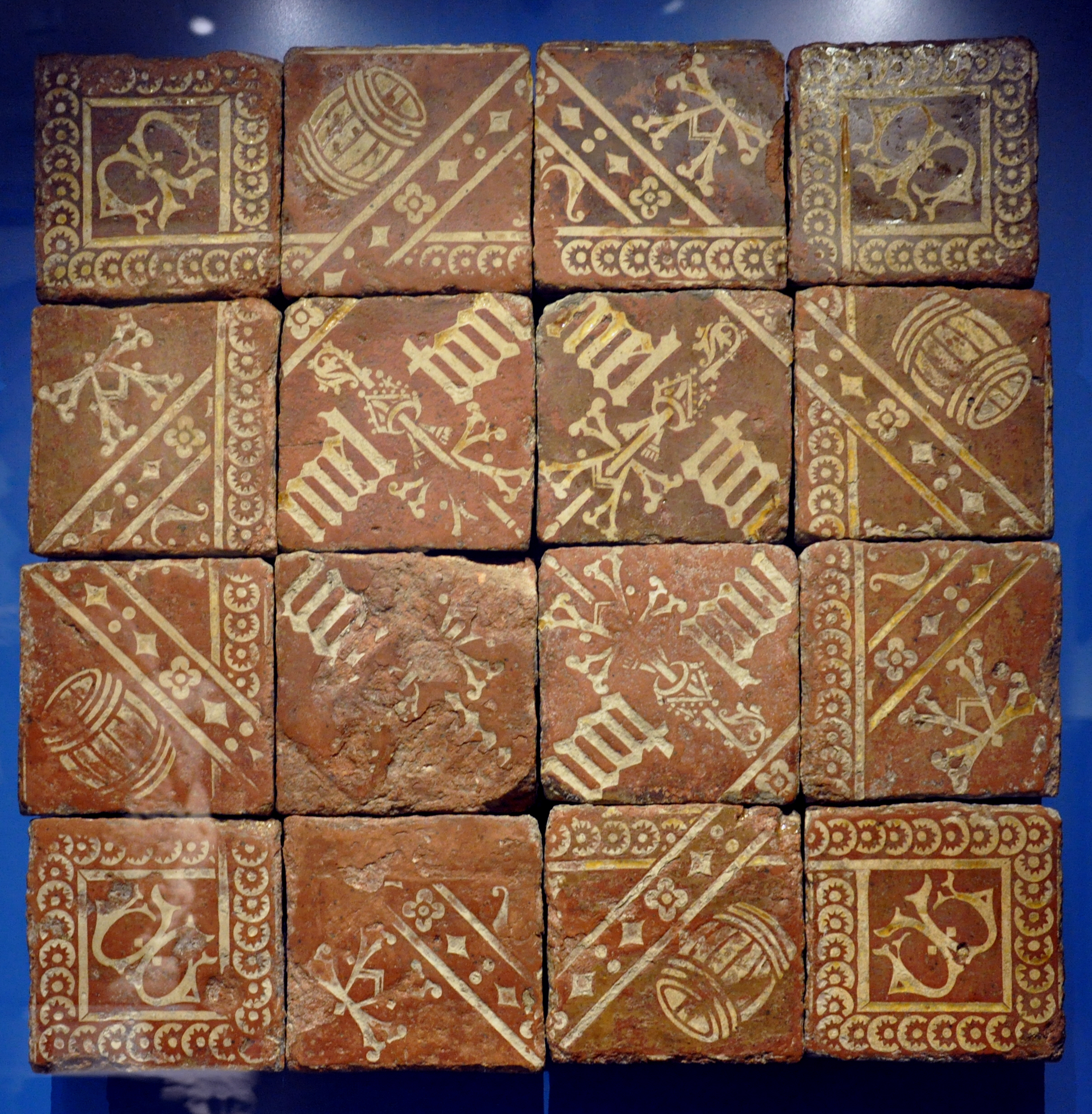
Early 16th century floor tiles from Southam de la Bere, included in Eames' Catalogue.

Eames was a popular teacher at university, extramural and general interest classes in various London institutions and continued this into her eighties. She made many contributions to medieval studies as well as her museum work. In partnership with A.B. Emden, she organised field workers in the late 1960s to gather material for a Census of Medieval Tiles in Britain. In 1958 she was elected a Fellow of the Society of Antiquaries and was on its council for a period. She was a leading member of the British Archaeological Association (BAA) for many years, and was active in several smaller, local archaeological associations in and near London. As well as being a vice-president of the BAA she contributed to its brick section which added to her reputation as a "considerable figure in the study of medieval building construction". She died on 20 September 2008.

== Select bibliography ==
- Medieval Tiles: a Handbook, British Museum Press 1968
- Catalogue of medieval lead-glazed earthenware tiles in the Department of Medieval and Later Antiquities, British Museum, Volumes 1 and 2, British Museum Publications c1980
- English Medieval Tiles, British Museum Publications 1985
- Irish Medieval Tiles, with T Fanning, Royal Irish Academy 1988
- English Tilers, British Museum Publications 1992
- Eames, Elizabeth S. & van Geersdaele, Peter C. (1972). "Further Notes on a Thirteenth-Century Tiled Pavement From the King's Chapel, Clarendon Palace". Journal of the British Archaeological Association. 35 (1). British Archaeological Association: 71–76. doi:10.1080/00681288.1972.11894924.
