= Portland Vase =

Roman cameo glass vase

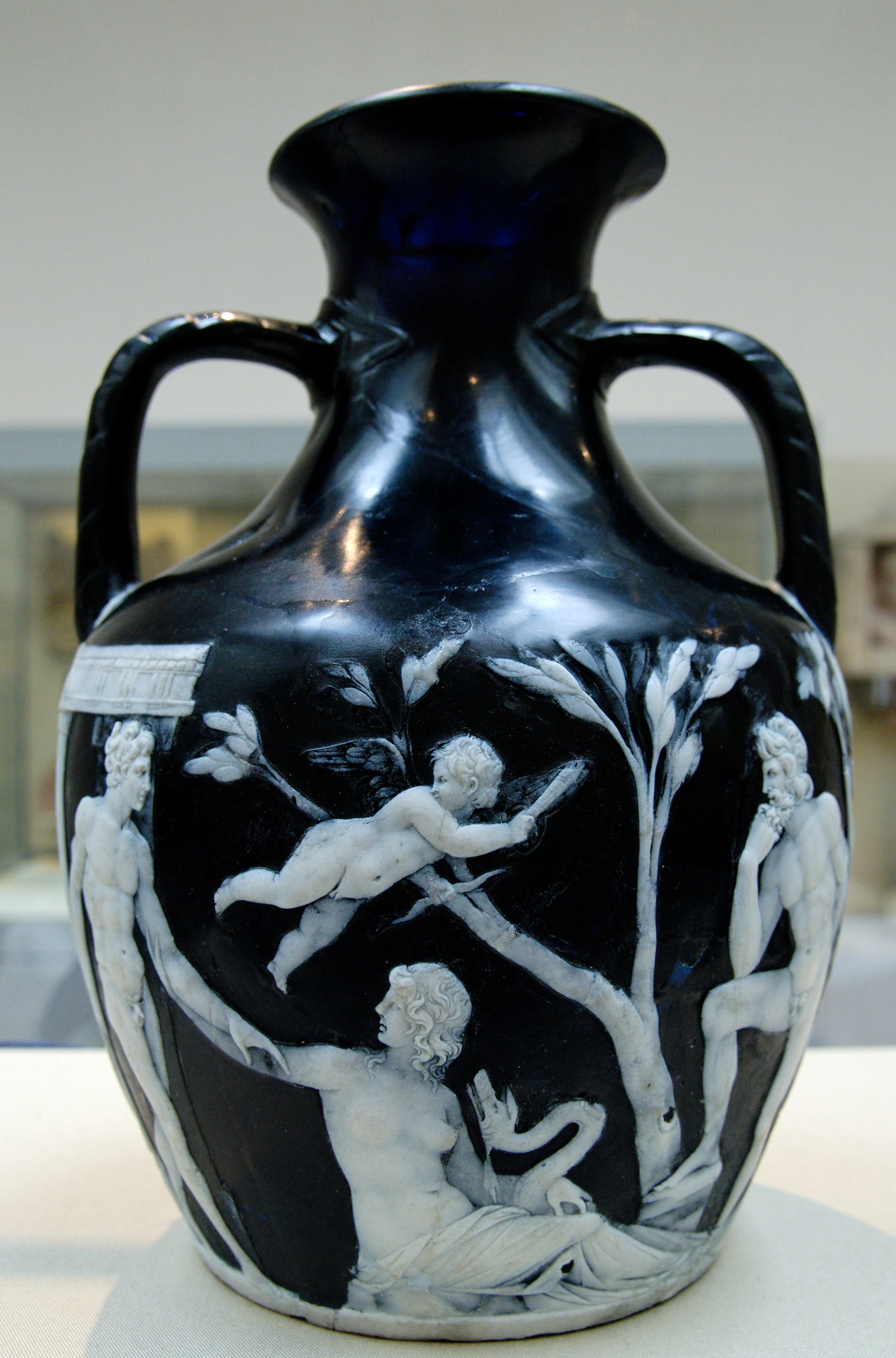
- Scene 1

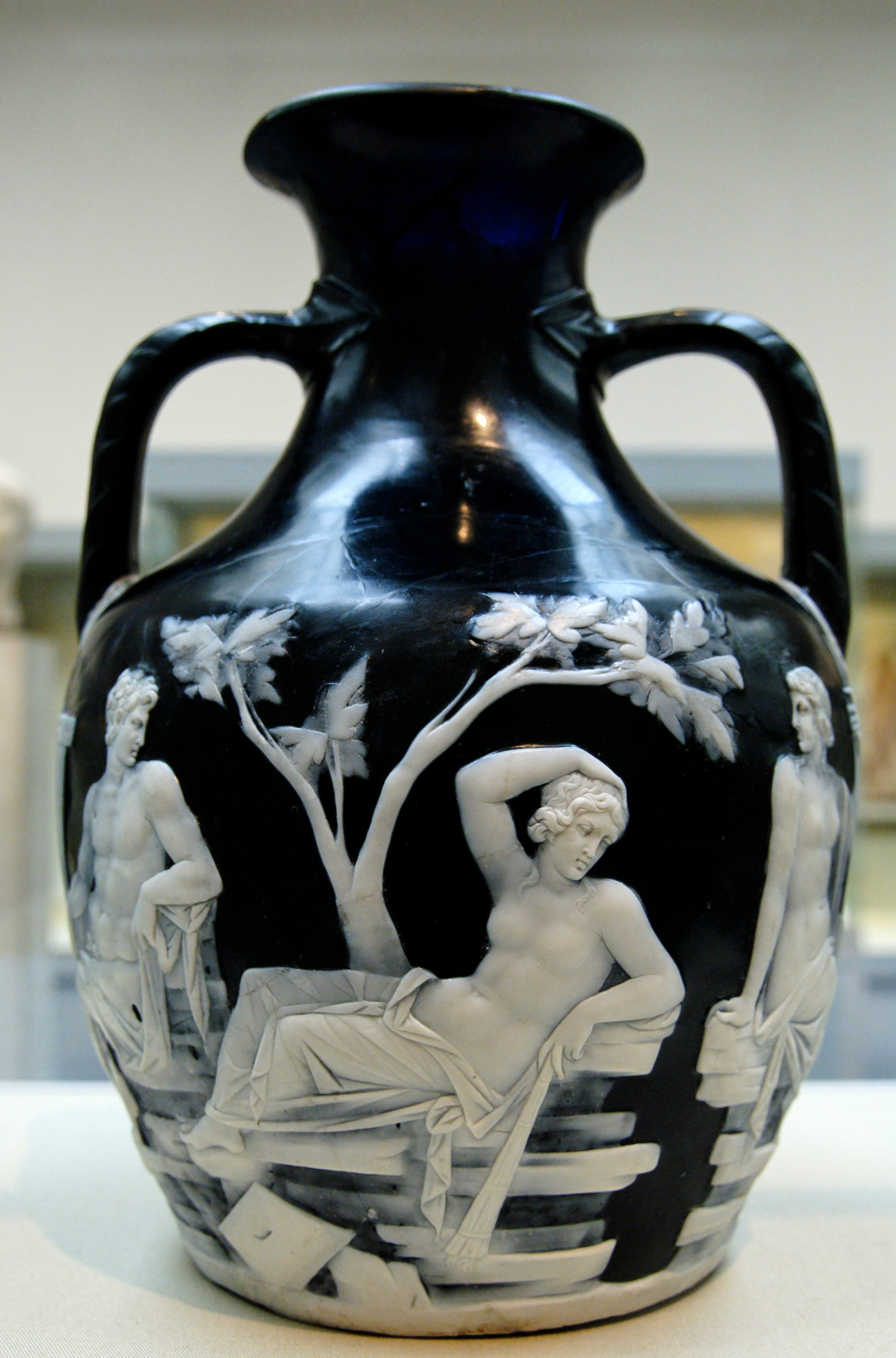
- Scene 2
- Material: Cameo glass
- Size: Height 24 cm (9.4 in), Diameter 17.7 cm (7.0 in)
- Created: 5–25 AD
- Present location: British Museum, London
- Registration: GR 1945.9-27.1 (Gems 4036)

The Portland Vase is a Roman cameo glass vase, which dates between AD 1 and AD 25, though low BC dates have some scholarly support. It is the best known piece of Roman cameo glass and has served as an inspiration to many glass and porcelain makers from about the beginning of the 18th century onwards. It was first recorded in Rome in 1600–1601, and since 1810 has been in the British Museum in London. The museum held it on loan from the dukes of Portland until 1945, and bought it from them that year (GR 1945,0927.1). It is normally on display in Room 70.

The vase measures about 25 centimetres (9.8 in) high and 18 cm (7.1 in) in diameter. It is made of violet-blue glass, and surrounded with a single continuous white glass cameo making two distinct scenes, depicting seven human figures, plus a large snake, and two bearded and horned heads below the handles, marking the break between the scenes.

The bottom of the vase was a cameo glass disc, also in blue and white, showing a head, presumed to be of Paris or Priam based on the Phrygian cap it wears. This roundel clearly does not belong to the vase and has been displayed separately since 1845. It may have been added in antiquity or later, or is the result of a conversion from an original amphora form (paralleled by a similar blue-glass cameo vessel from Pompeii). It was attached to the bottom from at least 1826.

== Iconography ==
The meaning of the images on the vase is unclear, and none of the many theories put forward have been found generally satisfactory. They fall into two main groups: mythological and historical, though a historical interpretation of a myth is also a possibility. Historical interpretations focus on Augustus, his family and his rivals, especially given the quality and expense of the object, and the somewhat remote neo-classicism of the style, which compares with some Imperial gemstone cameos featuring Augustus and his family with divine attributes, such as the Gemma Augustea, the Great Cameo of France and the Blacas Cameo (the last also in the British Museum). Interpretations of the portrayals have included that of a marine setting (due to the presence of a ketos or sea-snake), and of a marriage theme/context, as the vase may have been a wedding gift. Many scholars (including Charles Towneley) have concluded that the figures do not fit into a single iconographic set.

=== Scene 1 ===
Interpretations include:

- The marriage of mortal Peleus and the sea goddess Thetis, "the most enduring mythological interpretation".
- Dionysos greeting Ariadne with her sacred serpent, in the sacred grove for their marriage, symbolized by Cupid with a nuptial torch, in the presence of his foster-father, Silenus
- The story of the Emperor Augustus's supposed siring by the god Apollo in the form of a snake
- The younger man is Mark Antony being lured by the wiles of the reclining woman, Cleopatra VII (accompanied by an asp, the alleged type of venomous snake involved in the death of Cleopatra), into losing his manly romanitas and becoming decadent, with the bearded elder male figure being his mythical ancestor Anton looking on.
- The dream of Olympias, mother of Alexander the Great, who is emerging from the building to greet her, with his father Apollo as the serpent. This was the first theory, dating to 1633, and connected to Severus Alexander and his mother, "of whom a similar tale of reptilian paternity was told".

=== Scene 2 ===
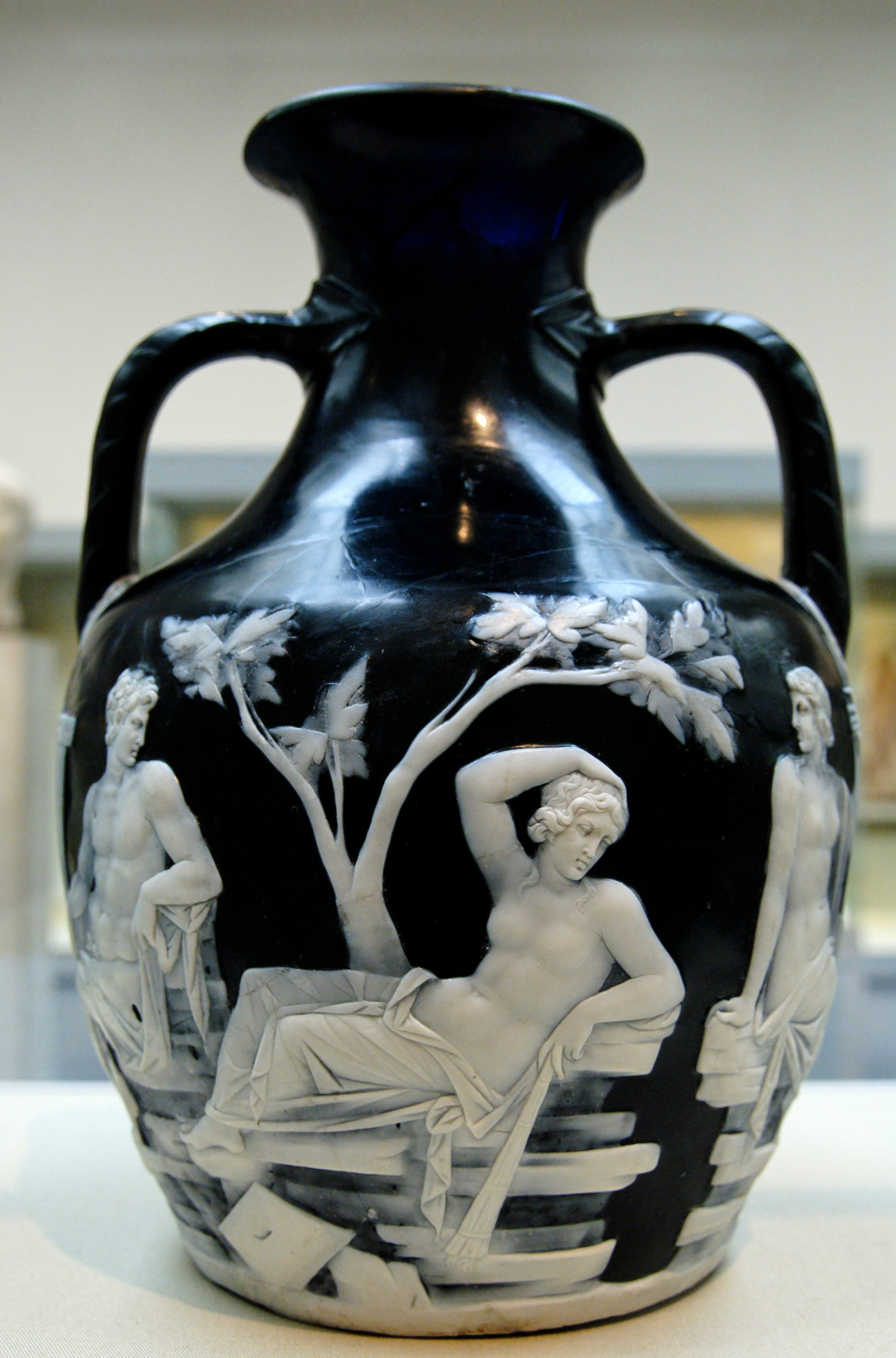
Scene 2

Interpretations include:

- A divinatory dream by Hecuba that the Judgement of Paris would lead to the destruction of Troy
- Ariadne languishing on Naxos
- The woman languishing is Octavia Minor, abandoned by Mark Antony, between her brother Augustus (left, as a god, as on the contemporary Sword of Tiberius) and Venus Genetrix, the ancestor of Augustus and Octavia's Julian gens.

==== Octavian theory ====
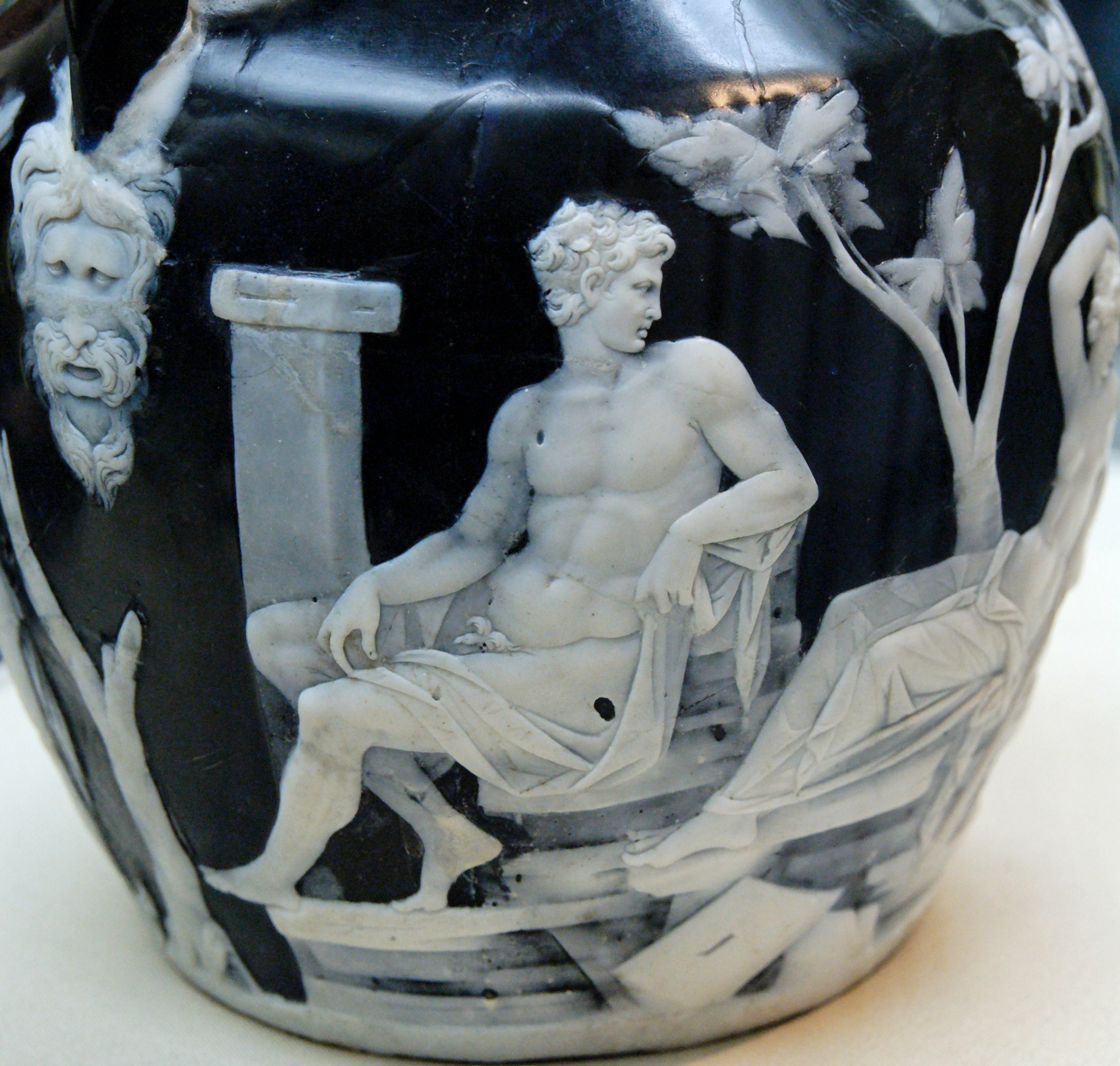
Detail, with the figure who might be Octavian

Another variant theory is that the vase dates back to circa 32 BC, and was commissioned by Octavian (later Caesar Augustus), as an attempt to promote his case against his fellow triumvirs, Mark Antony and Marcus Lepidus in the period after the death of Julius Caesar. It is based on the skill of the famous Greek carver of engraved gems Dioskourides, who is recorded as active and at his peak circa 40–15 BC and three of whose attributed cameos bear a close resemblance in line and quality to the Portland vase figures. This theory proposes that the first two figures are Gaius Octavius, father of the future emperor, and Atia, his mother (hence Cupid with the arrow) who had a dream of being impregnated by Apollo in the form of a sea serpent (ketos), note the snake's prominent teeth. The onlooker with his staff, could be Aeneas, a hero of the Trojan Wars who saved his father by carrying him over his back (hence his hunched position, and his Trojan beard) and who is believed to have founded Rome, and from whom the Julian gens, including Julius Caesar and Attia, claimed descent, witnessing the conception of Rome's future savior as an Empire, and the greatest of all the Emperors.

On the reverse is Octavian, Octavia his sister, widow of Mark Antony (downcast flambeau, broken tablets) and Livia, Octavian's third wife who outlived him. These two are looking directly at each other. Octavian commanded she divorce her then husband and marry him with a few weeks of meeting, she was mother to the future Emperor Tiberius.

This vase suggests Octavian was descended partly from Apollo (thus partly divine, shades of Achilles), whom he worshiped as a god, gave private parties in his honor together with Minerva, Roman Goddess of War, from the founder of Rome, and his connection to his uncle Julius Caesar, for whom as a young man he gave a remarkable funeral oratory, and who adopted him on his father's death, when he was only four. All the pieces and people fit in this theory and it explains most mysteries (apart from who actually made it). It would have been a fabulously expensive piece to commission, so that few men of the period could have afforded it. Several attempts at creating the vase must have been made, as modern reproduction trials show today (see below). Historians and archeologists dismiss this modern theory as gods and goddesses with mythical allegories were usually portrayed.

== Manufacture ==
Cameo glass vessels were probably all made within about two generations, as experiments when the blowing technique (discovered in about 50 BC) was still in its infancy. Recent research suggests that the Portland Vase, like most cameo glass vessels, was made by the dip-overlay method, whereby an elongated bubble of glass was partially dipped into a crucible of white glass before the two were blown together. After cooling the white layer was cut away to form the design.

Making a 19th-century copy required painstaking work. This experience suggests that creation of the original Portland Vase required two years of work. Cutting was probably performed by a skilled gem-cutter, possibly Dioskourides. Engraved gems are extant which are of a similar period and are signed and thought to be cut by him (Vollenweider 1966, see Gem in the collection of the duke of Devonshire "Diomedes stealing the Palladium"). This is supported by the Corning Museum in their 190-page study of the vase.

According to a controversial theory by Rosemarie Lierke, the vase, along with the rest of Roman cameo glass, was moulded rather than cold-cut, probably using white glass powder for the white layer.

Jerome Eisenberg has argued in Minerva that the vase was produced in the 16th century AD and not in antiquity, because the iconography is incoherent, but this theory has not been widely accepted.

== Rediscovery and provenance ==
Wedgwood copy in the British Galleries at the Victoria and Albert Museum, London, with its original roundel base still in place

One story suggests that it was discovered by Fabrizio Lazzaro in what was then thought to be the sarcophagus of the Emperor Alexander Severus (died 235) and his mother, at Monte del Grano near Rome, and excavated some time around 1582.

The first historical reference to the vase is in a letter of 1601 from the French scholar Nicolas-Claude Fabri de Peiresc to the painter Peter Paul Rubens, where it is recorded as in the collection of Cardinal Francesco Maria Del Monte in Italy. In 1626, it passed into the Barberini family collection (which also included sculptures such as the Barberini Faun and Barberini Apollo) where it remained for some two hundred years, being one of the treasures of Maffeo Barberini, later Pope Urban VIII (1623–1644). It was at this point that the Severan connection is first recorded. The vase was known as the "Barberini Vase" in this period.

=== 1778 to present ===
Between 1778 and 1780, Sir William Hamilton, British ambassador in Naples, bought the vase from James Byres, a Scottish art dealer, who had acquired it after it was sold by Cornelia Barberini-Colonna, Princess of Palestrina. She had inherited the vase from the Barberini family. Hamilton brought it to England on his next leave, after the death of his first wife, Catherine. In 1784, with the assistance of his niece, Mary, he arranged a private sale of the vase to Margaret Cavendish-Harley, Dowager Duchess of Portland. It was sold at auction in 1786 and passed into the possession of the duchess's son, William Cavendish-Bentinck, 3rd Duke of Portland.

The 3rd duke lent the original vase to Josiah Wedgwood and then to the British Museum for safe-keeping, by which point it was known as the "Portland Vase". It was deposited there permanently by the fourth duke in 1810, after a friend of his broke its base. It has remained in the British Museum ever since 1810, apart from 1929 to 1932, when the 6th duke put it up for sale at Christie's (where it failed to reach its reserve). It was finally purchased by the museum from the 7th duke in 1945 with the aid of a bequest from James Rose Vallentin.

==== Copies ====
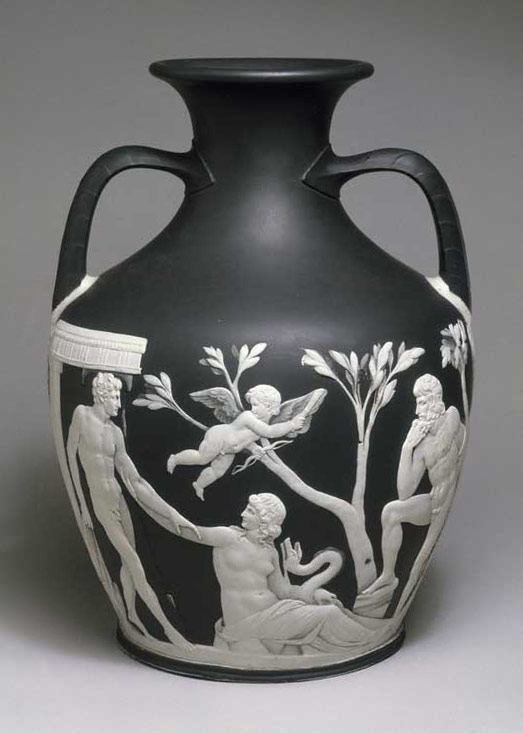
Replica of Portland Vase, about 1790, Josiah Wedgwood and Sons; V&A Museum no. 2418-1901

Wedgwood had already had it described to him by the sculptor John Flaxman as "the finest production of Art that has been brought to England and seems to be the very apex of perfection to which you are endeavoring" and devoted four years of painstaking trials at duplicating the vase – not in glass but in black and white jasperware. He had problems with his copies ranging from cracking and blistering (clearly visible on the example at the Victoria and Albert Museum) to the sprigged reliefs 'lifting' during the firing, and in 1786 he feared that he could never apply the Jasper relief thinly enough to match the glass original's subtlety and delicacy. He finally managed to perfect it in 1790, with the issue of the "first-edition" of copies (with some of this edition, including the V&A one, copying the cameo's delicacy by a combination of undercutting and shading the reliefs in grey), and it marks his last major achievement.

Wedgwood put the first edition on private show between April and May 1790, with that exhibition proving so popular that visitor numbers had to be restricted by only printing 1,900 tickets, before going on show in his public London showrooms. (One ticket to the private exhibition, illustrated by Samuel Alkin and printed with "Admission to see Mr Wedgwood's copy of The Portland Vase, Greek Street, Soho, between 12 o'clock and 5", was bound into the Wedgwood catalogue on view in the Victoria and Albert Museum's British Galleries.) As well as the V&A copy (said to have come from the collection of Wedgwood's grandson, the naturalist Charles Darwin), others are held at the Fitzwilliam Museum (this is the copy sent by Wedgwood to Erasmus Darwin which his descendants lent to the Museum in 1963 and later sold to them); the Department of Britain, Europe and Prehistory at the British Museum, and the Indianapolis Museum of Art. The Auckland War Memorial Museum has a 19th-century jasperware facsimile in their collections. The soap magnate William Hesketh Lever, who assembled one of the finest collections of Wedgwood Jasperware in existence today, purchased two of Wedgwood's Portland vases. One of them is on display in the Wedgwood rooms of the Lady Lever Art Gallery in Port Sunlight. The Wedgwood Museum collection is now branded the V&A Wedgwood Collection. Displays at Barlaston, near Stoke-on-Trent, are now branded World of Wedgwood, and include the galleries of the V&A Wedgwood Collection.

The vase also inspired a 19th-century competition to duplicate its cameo-work in glass, with Benjamin Richardson offering a £1,000 prize to anyone who could achieve that feat. Taking three years, glass maker Philip Pargeter made a copy and John Northwood engraved it, to win the prize. This copy is in the Corning Museum of Glass in Corning, New York.

In 2012, Richard Golding blew glass blanks to which Terri-Louise Colledge added the cameo-work. They made four flat-bottomed vases, one amphora and an Auldjo jug, all of which are on display in the Stourbridge Glass Museum.

==== Vandalism and reconstruction ====
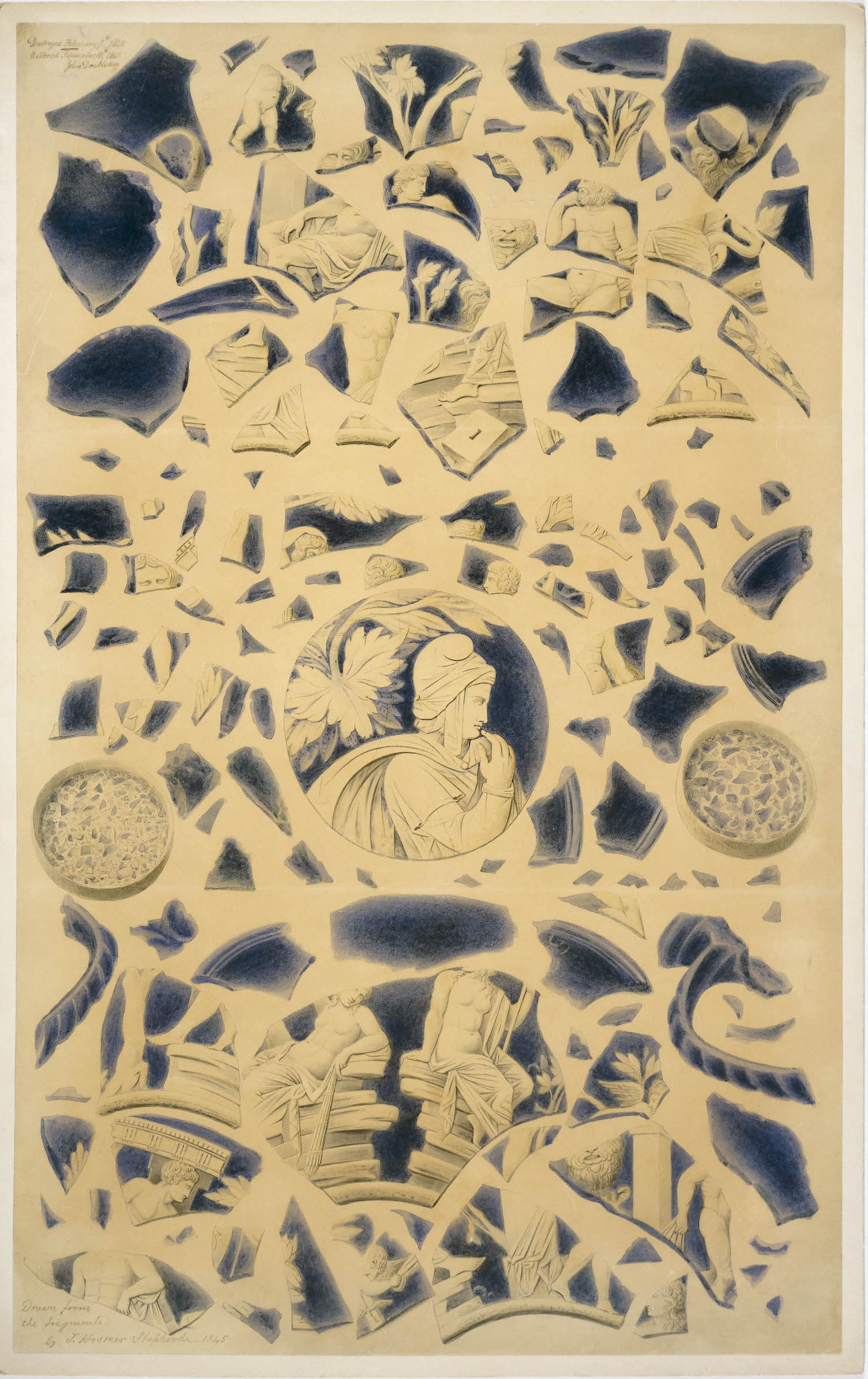
The Portland Vase fragments – watercolour by Thomas H. Shepherd (1845)

At 3:45 p.m. on 7 February 1845, the vase was shattered by William Lloyd, who, after drinking all the previous week, threw a nearby sculpture on top of the case, smashing both it and the vase. He was arrested and charged with the crime of wilful damage. When his lawyer said that an error in the wording of the act seemed to limit its application to the destruction of objects worth no more than £5, he was convicted instead of the destruction of the glass case in which the vase had sat. He was sentenced to either pay a fine of £3 (approximately £350 equivalent in 2017) or spend two months in prison. He remained in prison until an anonymous benefactor paid the fine by mail. The name William Lloyd is thought to be a pseudonym. Investigators hired by the British Museum concluded that he was actually William Mulcahy, a student who had gone missing from Trinity College Dublin. Detectives reported that the Mulcahy family was impoverished. The owner of the vase declined to bring a civil action against William Mulcahy because he did not want his family to suffer for "an act of folly or madness which they could not control".

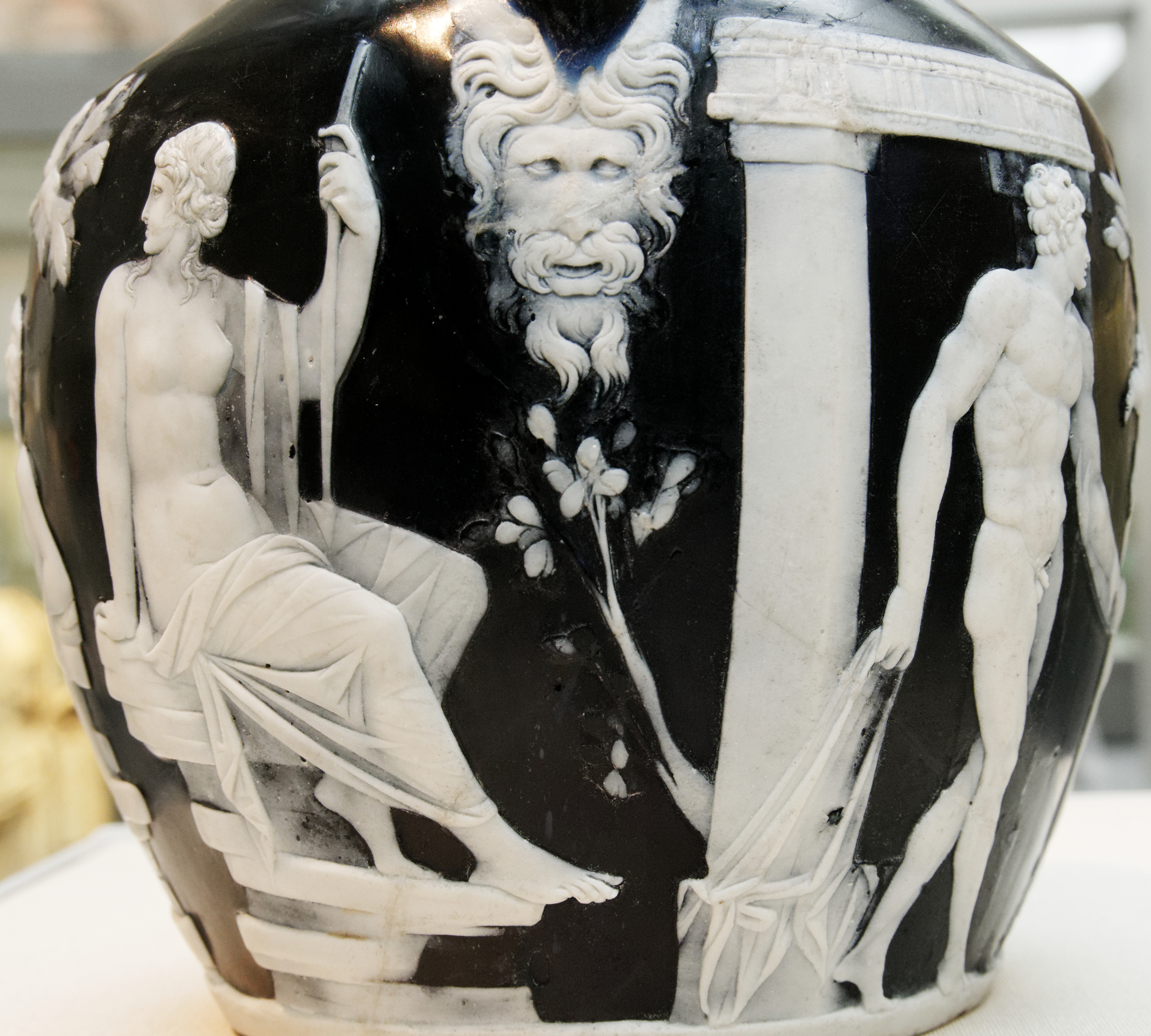
Detail

The vase was pieced together with fair success in 1845 by British Museum restorer John Doubleday. At the time, the restoration was termed "masterly" and Doubleday was lauded by The Gentleman's Magazine for demonstrating "skilful ingenuity" and "cleverness ... sufficient to establish his immortality as the prince of restorers".

However, Doubleday was unable to replace thirty-seven small fragments of the vase, which had been put into a box and apparently forgotten. On 5 October 1948, the keeper Bernard Ashmole received them in a box from G. A. Croker of Putney, who did not know what they were. After Doubleday's death, a fellow restorer from the British Museum took them to G. H. Gabb, a box maker, who was asked to make a box with thirty seven compartments, one for each fragment. However, the restorer also died and the box was never collected. After Gabb's death, the executor of his estate, Amy Reeves, brought in Croker to assess Gabb's effects. This was how Croker came to bring them to the museum to ask for help in identifying them.

By November 1948, the restoration appeared aged and it was decided to restore the vase again. It was dismantled by conservator J. W. R. Axtell in mid-November 1948. The pieces were examined by D. B. Harden and W. A. Thorpe, who confirmed that the circular glass base removed in 1845 was not original. Axtell then carried out a reconstruction, completed by 2 February 1949, in which he was only successful in replacing three of the 37 loose fragments. He reportedly used "new adhesives" for this restoration, which some thought might be epoxy resins or shellac, but were later discovered to simply be the same type of animal glue that Doubleday used in 1845. He also filled some areas with wax. No documentation of his work was produced.

By the late 1980s, the adhesive was again yellowing and brittle. Although the vase was shown at the British Museum as part of the Glass of the Caesars exhibition (November 1987 – March 1988), it was too fragile to travel to other locations afterwards. Instead, another reconstruction was performed between 1 June 1988 and 1 October 1989 by Nigel Williams and Sandra Smith. The pair were overseen by David Akehurst (CCO of Glass and Ceramics) who had assessed the vase's condition during the Glass of the Caesars exhibition and decided to go ahead with reconstruction and stabilization. The treatment had scholarly attention and press coverage. The vase was photographed and drawn to record the position of fragments before dismantling; the BBC filmed the conservation process. Conservation scientists at the museum tested many adhesives for long-term stability, choosing an epoxy resin with excellent ageing properties. Reassembly revealed some fragments had been filed down during the restorations, complicating the process. All but a few small splinters were integrated. Gaps were filled with blue or white resin.

Little sign of the original damage is visible, and, except for light cleaning, it is hoped that the vase should not require major conservation work for at least another century.
