= Andrew Oddy =

British conservator (born 1942)

W. Andrew Oddy OBE FSA
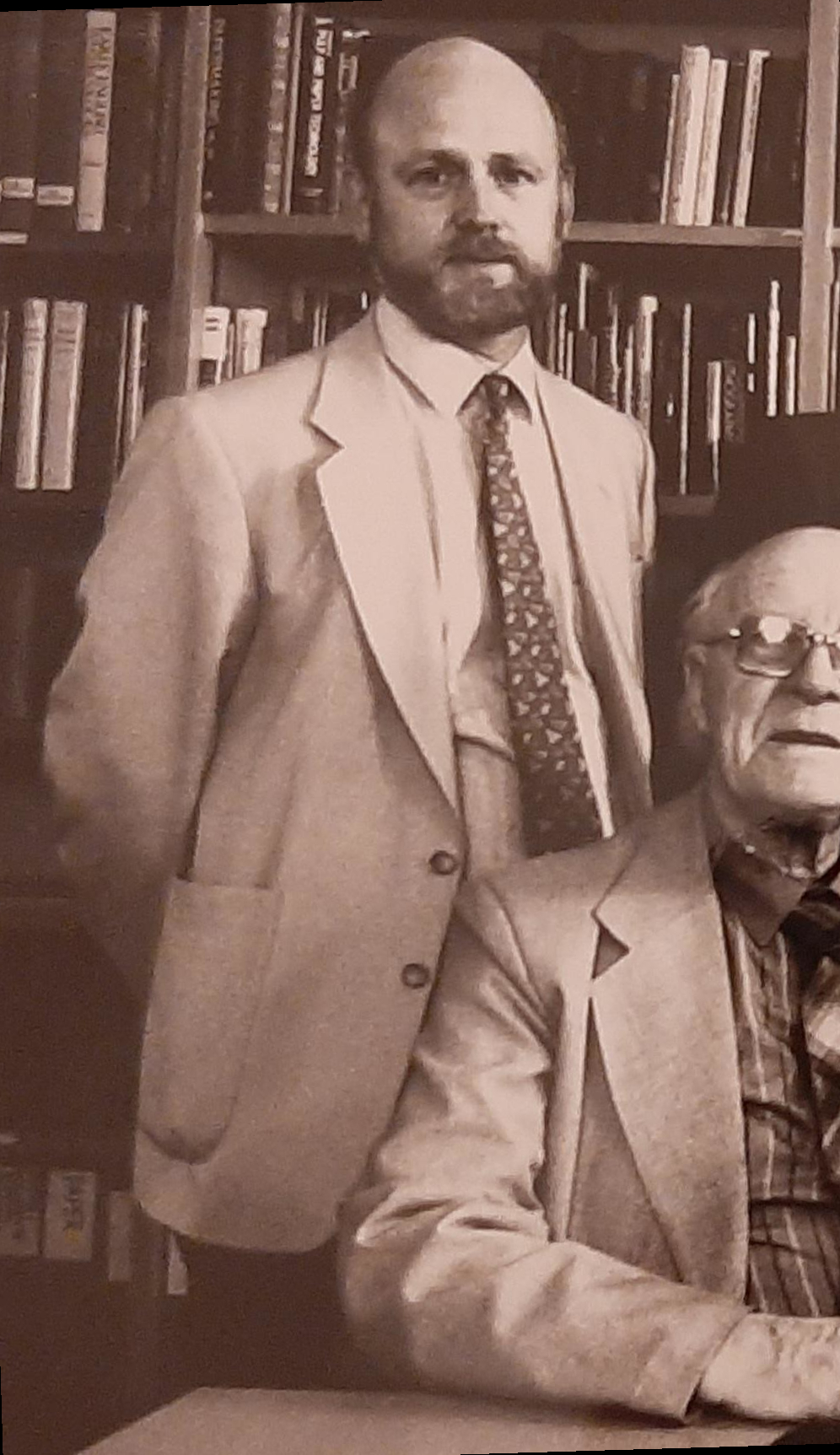
- Oddy (standing) in 1987
- Born: 6 January 1942 (age 84); Bradford, England
- Occupation: Museum conservator

Academic background
- Education: Bradford Grammar School; New College, Oxford
- Website: www.wandrewoddy.com

William Andrew Oddy OBE FSA (born 6 January 1942) is a British conservator who was Keeper of Conservation at the British Museum. He is notable for his publications on artefact conservation and numismatics, and for the development of the Oddy test. In 1996 he was awarded the Forbes Prize "for outstanding work in the field of conservation" by the International Institute for Conservation, and gave the attendant Forbes Lecture that year in Copenhagen. He retired in 2002 and was appointed as an Officer of the Order of the British Empire the same year.

== Early life ==
William Andrew Oddy was born on 6 January 1942 in Bradford and spent his childhood in the nearby township of Baildon. He was the first son of William Tingle Oddy, then serving in the Auxiliary Fire Service for the duration of World War II, and Hilda Florence Oddy (née Dalby). He attended Sandal Primary School in Baildon and Bradford Grammar School. It was during these years that he developed an interest in archaeology after having visited the excavations at Meare Lake Village in Somerset that were being directed by Harold St George Gray. When in the sixth form he went with parties from Bradford Grammar School on several occasions to excavate in York under the direction of George Willmot of the Yorkshire Museum. He also took an interest in stonemason's marks on mediaeval buildings and this led to his first publications, which were in the Archaeology Group Bulletin published by Bradford City Art Gallery and Museums.

In the summer of 1960, Oddy participated in the King Hussein Youth Camp in Jordan. Two weeks were spent visiting religious and archaeological sites.

== University ==
In October 1961, Oddy went to New College, Oxford to read chemistry. He was awarded a BA at the end of year three in 1964 and a BSc following the submission of a dissertation in 1965. An MA followed in 1969 and a DSc in 1993. He became a Freeman of the Worshipful Company of Goldsmiths and a Freeman of the City of London in 1986.

== Career ==
On graduating in 1965, Oddy joined the Research Department of the Agricultural Division of Imperial Chemical Industries at Billingham in County Durham as a junior research scientist but resigned September 1966 to take up a post as a scientific officer at the Research Laboratory in the British Museum. His role was to research methods and materials for the conservation of antiquities and during this period projects included cleaning the Elgin Marbles, cleaning limestone sculptures, and preserving waterlogged wood. In 1968, he was given the role of overseeing the conservation and scientific examination of the finds from the Sutton Hoo ship burial, excavated in 1939. He was promoted to Senior Scientific Officer in June 1969 and Principal Scientific Officer in December 1974.

In 1975, as a result of a re-organisation within the British Museum, Oddy was given the management of metallurgy, x-ray diffraction and radiography and became responsible for coordinating the British Museum's forensic examination of objects submitted for acquisition. During this period research projects included the manufacture of gold wire in antiquity, the assaying of gold in antiquity, the analysis of gold coins using the Archimedes method, and the composition of niello inlay in antiquity.

Oddy was appointed Head of Conservation in 1981 and then elevated to Keeper of Conservation in 1985. In later years, his research focused on the history and philosophy of conservation. He retired on his 60th birthday in 2002.

== Research projects ==
=== Marble sculpture ===
In the early 1960s, the British Museum began an extensive programme of cleaning its collection of classical marble sculptures by the application of a solvent to remove atmospheric grease and a mud-pack to suck out dirt from the porous surface. The mud-pack consisted of a natural clay-like material called sepiolite, and the procedure was known as the Sepiolite Method. By 1966 much of the reserve collection of marbles had been cleaned and only the Elgin Marbles remained. These were, however, a sensitive issue because of a scandal in the late 1930s when craftsmen had over-enthusiastically scraped at natural deposits on some of the surfaces with copper tools. In 1966, Oddy and a senior conservator, Hannah Lane, did some initial cleaning which showed that the sepiolite method did not adversely affect the marble but did leave the surface looking rather milky in appearance. It was thus decided to apply a very dilute solution of a water-soluble polyethylene glycol wax.

=== Waterlogged wood ===
In the autumn of 1970, dredging operations in a drainage channel on the Graveney marshes on the north coast of Kent revealed the remains of a small ship, the wood of which was completely waterlogged. The National Maritime Museum decided to recover and conserve the remains of this early medieval boat and asked the Research Laboratory of the British Museum for assistance. This led to a programme of research into the conservation of waterlogged wood. The result was that the method chosen was the replacement of the water inside the wood with a water-soluble polyethylene glycol wax by soaking in tanks of the wax for many months. Tanks were built at the National Maritime Museum to conserve the boat.

=== Corrosion of museum objects ===
In 1972, the Wallace Collection sought the help of the British Museum Research Laboratory to investigate the tarnishing of gold snuff boxes after they had been on display for only a few months. Tarnish in the form of silver sulphide was spreading from the settings of precious stones. Testing of the materials of which the showcase were made revealed that the main structural timber was an African pseudo-mahogany and that this caused silver to tarnish very quickly. Fresh samples of this timber were inert and it was assumed that the timber of the showcase had been treated with a chemical either as a fire retardant or insect repellent.

The method of testing materials to be used in the construction of storage units or display cases for metal objects eventually became standardised and known as the Oddy Test. It is widely used in museums around the world.

=== Forensic examination of antiquities ===
From 1981, when he was appointed as Head of Conservation, Oddy had little time for research. However, his interest in history and biography led him to study the origins of 'modern' conservation in the UK and, especially, in the British Museum. His own hero was Harold Plenderleith, the first keeper of the Research Laboratory. In 2001, Oddy and Sandra Smith organised a 'swansong' conference at the British Museum on the history of conservation worldwide. In 2005, Oddy participated in a European Union-funded project on the history of conservation organised by the Associazione Giovanni Secco Suardo. He wrote three contributions on the history of conservation in the UK.

== Publications ==
Oddy has contributed numerous obituaries to the national press and to various journals, newsletters, magazines and online sites. Harold James Plenderleith, He has also contributed to numerous biographical articles in Amplius Vetusta Servare, such as those relating to John Doubleday, Nigel Williams and David Baynes-Cope.

Among Oddy's many other publications are:

- Archaeology Group Bulletin. 5 (11). November 1960.
- Archaeology Group Bulletin. 9 (6): 4. June 1964.
- Archaeology Group Bulletin. 11 (1): 3. January 1966.
- Archaeology Group Bulletin. 11 (5): 38. May 1966.
- Archaeology Group Bulletin. 11 (11): 100. November 1966.
- Oddy, W. A. (1972). "Packing and Transporting the Graveney Boat". The International Journal of Nautical Archaeology and Underwater Exploration. 1 (1): 175–177. Bibcode:1972IJNAr...1..175O. doi:10.1111/j.1095-9270.1972.tb00693.x.
- Oddy, William Andrew; Cook, Brian Francis (1989). "Preface". In Williams, Nigel (ed.). The Breaking and Remaking of the Portland Vase. London: British Museum Publications. ISBN 0-7141-1291-7.
- Oddy, William Andrew, ed. (1992). The Art of the Conservator. London: British Museum Press. ISBN 978-0-7141-2056-0.
- Oddy, William Andrew; Winsor, Peter (1998). "A Provisional Bibliography of Harold James Plenderleith". Studies in Conservation. 43 (3). International Institute for Conservation of Historic and Artistic Work: 144–149. doi:10.1179/sic.1998.43.3.144. JSTOR 1506741.
- Oddy, William Andrew (2002). "Foreword". In Williams, Nigel; Hogan, Loretta; Bruce-Mitford, Myrtle (eds.). Porcelain: Repair and Restoration (2nd ed.). Philadelphia: University of Pennsylvania Press. ISBN 9780812237030.
