= David Whitehouse =

British archaeologist and research centre head

David Whitehouse FSA FRGS
- Born: 15 October 1941
- Died: 17 February 2013 (aged 71)

Academic background
- Education: St John's College, Cambridge

Academic work
- Discipline: Archaeologist
- Sub-discipline: Near Eastern archaeology; Roman archaeology; glass
- Institutions: University of Oxford; British Institute of Afghan Studies; British School at Rome; Corning Museum of Glass

David Bryn Whitehouse, FSA, FRGS (15 October 1941 – 17 February 2013) was a British archaeologist and senior scholar of the Corning Museum of Glass. He was director of the British School at Rome between 1974 and 1984.

== Early life ==
Whitehouse was born 15 October 1941, the son of Brindley Charles Whitehouse and his wife Alice Margaret Whitehouse. He grew up in the village of Wildmoor near Bromsgrove, Worcestershire. He was educated at Catshill First School and at King Edward's School a private school located in Birmingham. He read for a Bachelor of Arts (BA), later promoted to Master of Arts (MA), at St John's College, Cambridge. He held a Doctor of Philosophy degree (PhD) in Archaeology, also from the University of Cambridge.

== Academic career ==
Whitehouse was a scholar at the British School at Rome from 1963 to 1965. He became Wainwright Fellow in Near Eastern Archaeology at the University of Oxford from 1966 to 1973. During that tenure, he was director of excavations at Siraf in the Persian Gulf. Many of the finds he excavated at Siraf are now in the British Museum.

He was director of the British Institute of Afghan Studies between 1973 and 1974, and director of the British School at Rome for ten years, from 1974 to 1984. In 1984, he joined the Corning Museum of Glass as chief curator. He became deputy director of collections three years later, and in 1988 he was appointed deputy director of the museum. He became director in 1992 and executive director in 1999. He stood down from the post in 2011, becoming the museum's senior scholar.

In 1985, he published an article based on his work as Director of Excavations at Siraf, in which he concluded, "I cannot avoid the conclusion that foreign trade had reached an unprecedented level [from Siraf] and now included direct contact with China". The discovery in 1998 of the Belitung shipwreck, a Central Asian-in-origin ship, dated to ~826 by experts, and whose salvaged collection of Chinese (Tang Dynasty) trade ceramics is now on display in Singapore's Asian Civilisations Museum, proves his conclusion correct.

== Later life ==
Having battled for a short time with cancer, Whitehouse died on 17 February 2013.

== Personal life ==
Whitehouse married Ruth Delamain Ainger in 1963. Together they had one son and two daughters: Peter, Sarah, and Susan. In October 1975, he married Elizabeth-Anne Ollemans in Johannesburg, South Africa. They also had one son and two daughters: Simon, Julia, and Nicci.

== Honours ==
Whitehouse was elected a Fellow of the Society of Antiquaries of London (FSA) on 11 January 1973. He was also a Fellow of the Royal Geographical Society (FRGS).

== Selected works ==
Whitehouse wrote or edited more than 500 scholarly papers, reviews, monographs, and books. The following are a selection of those.

- Painter, Kenneth & Whitehouse, David (1990). "The History of the Portland Vase". Journal of Glass Studies. 32. Corning Museum of Glass: 24–84. JSTOR 24188030.
- Whitehouse, D. and Whitehouse, R. 1975. Archaeological atlas of the world. San Francisco: W. H. Freeman.
- Whitehouse, D. 1988. Glass of the Roman Empire. Corning, N.Y. : Corning Museum of Glass.
- Whitehouse, D. 2000. The Corning Museum of Glass: a decade of glass collecting, 1990–1999. Corning, N.Y.: The Museum: New York.
- Carboni, Stefano; Whitehouse, David (2001). Glass of the sultans. New York: The Metropolitan Museum of Art. ISBN 0870999869.
- Whitehouse, D. 2012. Glass: A Short History. London: British Museum Press.
