= Kenneth Painter =

British deputy keeper (1935–2016)

Kenneth Scott Painter (28 March 1935 – 14 May 2016) was a deputy keeper of Greek and Roman antiquities at the British Museum and an authority on Roman and late antique silver. He was also a vice-president of the British Archaeological Association in 1997 and a trustee of Oxford Archaeology. He received a DLitt from Oxford University in 2004.

== Selected publications ==
- The Mildenhall Treasure: Roman Silver from East Anglia. British Museum Publications, London, 1977. ISBN 9780714113654
- The Water Newton early Christian silver. British Museum Publications, London, 1977. ISBN 9780714113647
- Painter, Kenneth & Whitehouse, David (1990). "The History of the Portland Vase". Journal of Glass Studies. 32. Corning Museum of Glass: 24–84. JSTOR 24188030.
- The Insula of the Menander at Pompeii: Volume IV: The Silver Treasure. Oxford University Press, Oxford, 2001. ISBN 978-0199242368
- Late Roman Silver. The Traprain Treasure in Context. Society of Antiquaries of Scotland, 2013. ISBN 978-1908332028
