= Spridleston =

Historic manor in Devon, England

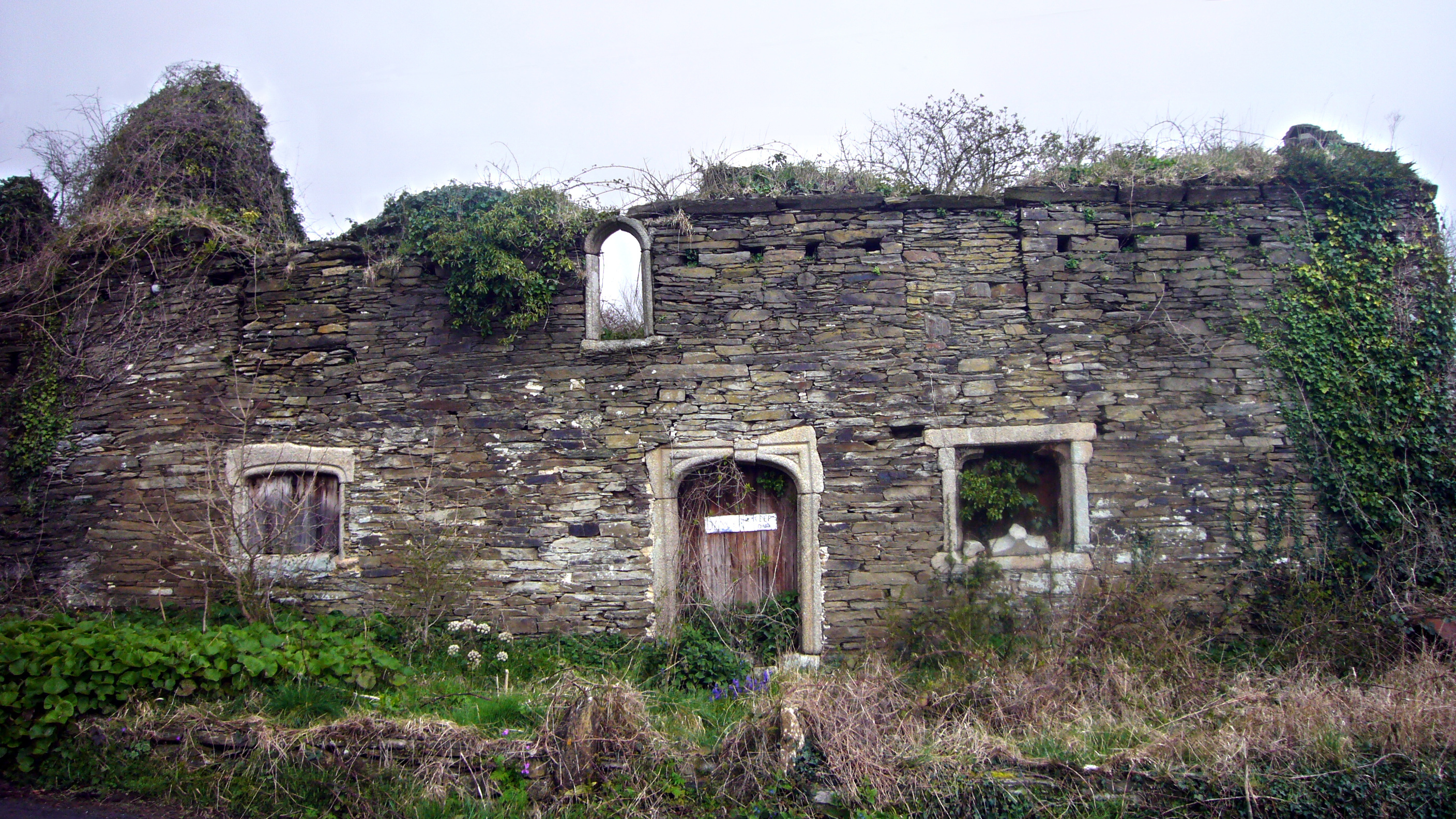
Derelict house at Spridleston, with high-status granite-sculpted door and window openings

Map showing Fortescue seats in South Devon. The earliest recorded English seat of the Fortescue family was Whympston in the parish of Modbury. The most prominent Fortescue seat was Castle Hill, Filleigh in North Devon, seat of Earl Fortescue until 1958

Spridleston (modern: Spriddlestone) is an historic manor in the parish of Brixton in Devon, England, long a seat of a branch of the prominent and widespread Fortescue family. The ancient manor house does not survive, but it is believed to have occupied the site of the present Spriddlestone Barton, a small Georgian stuccoed house a few hundred yards from the larger Spriddlestone House, also a Georgian stuccoed house, both centred on the hamlet of Spriddlestone and near Higher Spriddlestone Farm.

== Descent ==
=== Anglo-Saxons ===
Before the Norman Conquest of 1066 the manor was held by four thanes, who held it "freely (and jointly)", as the Domesday Book records: Quattuor taini libe(re) teneb(ant) T(empore) R(egis) E(duardi).

=== Domesday Book ===
Spredelestone is listed in the Domesday Book of 1086 as the 52nd of the 79 Devonshire holdings of Robert, Count of Mortain, Earl of Cornwall, (c. 1031–1090) a Norman nobleman and the uterine half-brother of King William the Conqueror and one of the Devon Domesday Book tenants-in-chief of that king. His tenant was Reginald I de Vautort (died about 1123), who held several other Devonshire manors from the count and held also from him 57 manors centred on Trematon Castle After the Count's rebellion his landholdings reverted to the king and were re-granted as separate feudal baronies to several of his larger tenants. Thus Reginald I de Vautort became a tenant-in-chief and the first holder of the Feudal barony of Trematon in Cornwall. Richard, 1st Earl of Cornwall (1209-1272), second son of King John and Isabella of Angoulême, bought the barony in 1270, and it thus became again a possession of the Duchy of Cornwall.

=== Ferrers ===
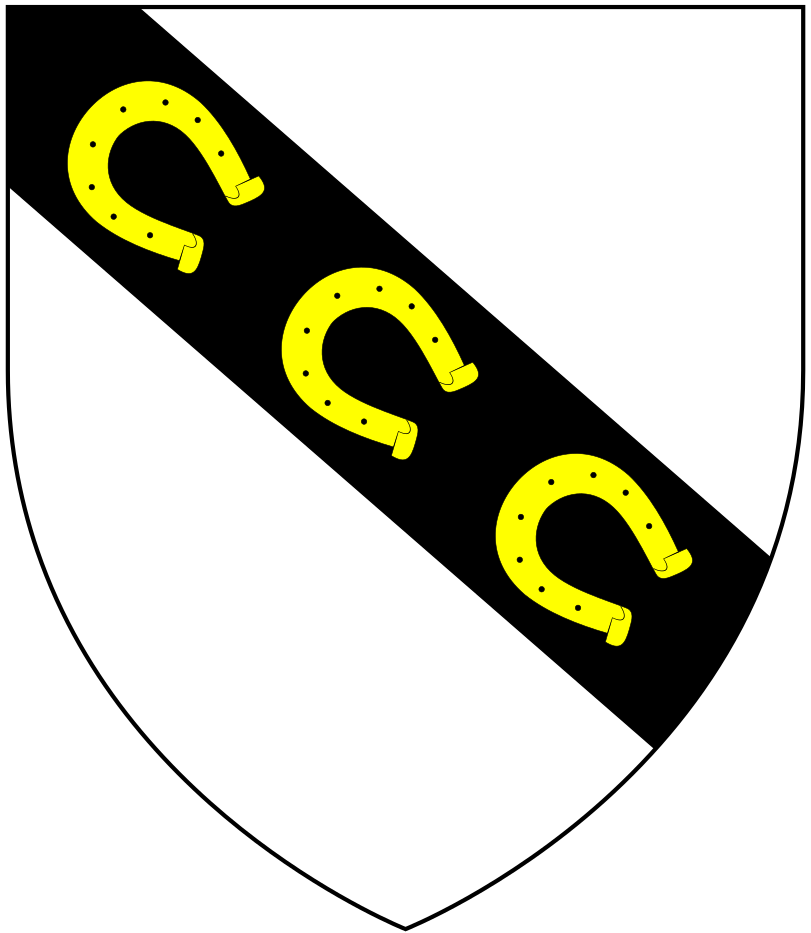
Canting arms of Ferrers: Argent, on a bend sable three horse-shoes or. The name was Latinized as de Ferariis, from the Latin noun ferrarius (from ferrum, "iron"), meaning an iron-worker or blacksmith

The manor is recorded in the Feudal Aids 1284-1431 as held from the Honour of Trematon by Reginald de Ferrers. His surname was Latinized as de Ferariis, from the Latin noun ferrarius (from ferrum, "iron"), meaning an iron-worker or blacksmith, hence his canting arms display three horseshoes. His tenant was Ralph Spridel, who also held La Forsen, probably a constituent part of the Domesday Book manor of Spredelestone. The chief seat of the Ferrers family of Devon was Bere Ferrers, formerly just Bere, which they held also from the Honour of Trematon. They held also Newton Ferrers, formerly just Newton, also from the Honour of Trematon, and Churston Ferrers, together with many other manors held from other superior lords.

=== de Spridleston ===
The Devon historian Pole (d.1635), states: Spridelston hath given name & dwellinge unto a famylye and proceeds to give the descent of Spridleston in the de Spridleston family as follows: William de Spridleston dwelled there in 1242 and was followed by Walter de Spridleston, Raph de Spridleston (who lived there in 1295), Roger de Spridleston who lived there in 1314 and 1345; William de Spridleston (1347) and Walter de Spridleston in 1364.

=== Fortescue ===
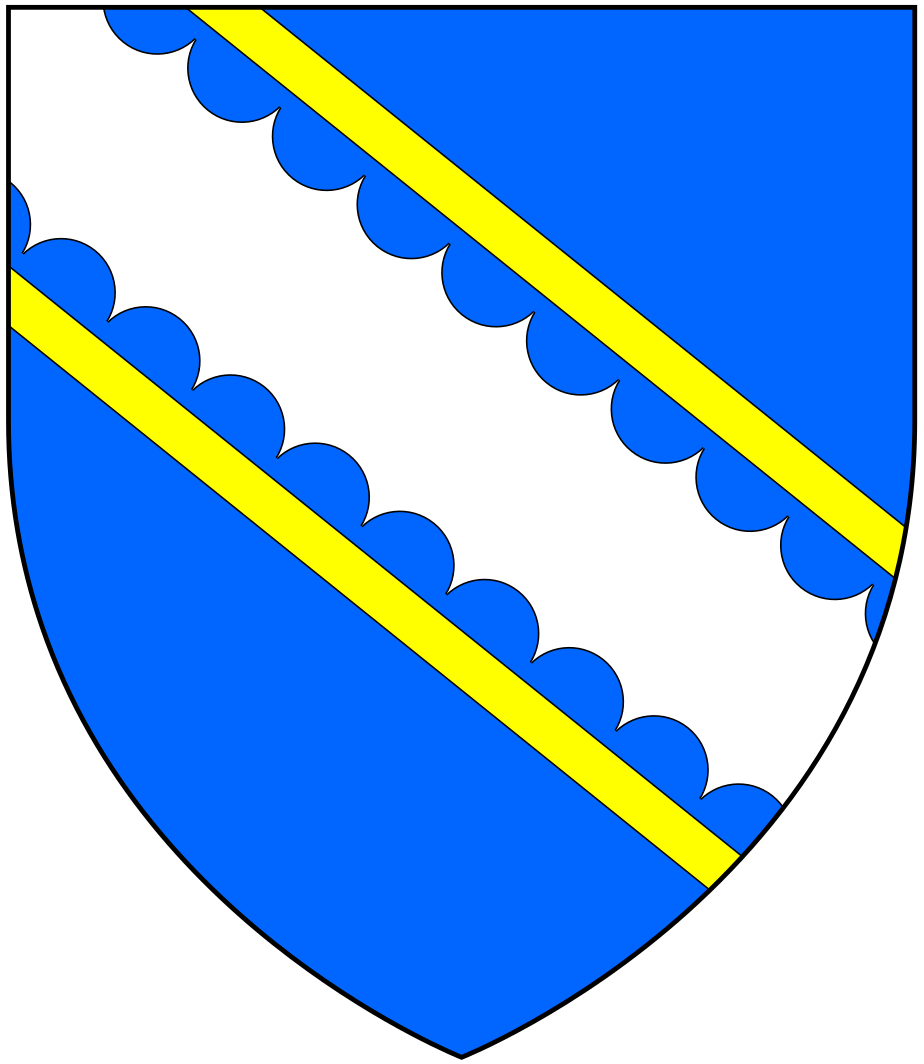
Arms of Fortescue: Azure, a bend engrailed argent cottised or. Latin canting motto: Forte Scutum Salus Ducum ("A Strong Shield is the Salvation of Leaders")

==== John Fortescue, MP ====
Arms of Falwell: Gules, on a bend wavy argent three water bougets sable, as seen in Buckland Filleigh Church

Spridleston was next held by the Fortescue family who acquired it by means unknown. The first mentioned holder according to Pole was John Fortescue of Whympston in the parish of Modbury, Devon, the earliest recorded English seat of the Fortescue family. He was the eldest son of William Fortescue of Whympston (by his wife Isabel Falwell, daughter and heiress of John Falwell, of Falwell (today "Velwell") in the parish of Rattery, Devon) elder brother of John Fortescue (died after 1432), of Sheepham in the parish of Modbury, Captain of the captured Castle of Meaux, during the Hundred Years' War (ancestor of Earl Fortescue). He was a Member of Parliament successively for Totnes, Tavistock and Plympton. John Fortescue, MP, married Jane Preston (d.1501), who survived her husband, daughter and heiress of John Preston of Preston in the parish of Newton Ferrers in Devon. By his wife he had three sons:

- John Fortescue (d.1519) of Whympston, eldest son and heir, who continued the senior line of the family at that ancient seat. His descendants were not prominent.
- William Fortescue (d.1519/20), 2nd son, whose descendants founded a line of the family at Preston, the inheritance of his mother Jane Preston.
- John Fortescue (d.1538), 3rd son, of Spridleston, which manor was given to him by his father, and where he founded his own branch of the family.

==== John Fortescue (d.1538) ====
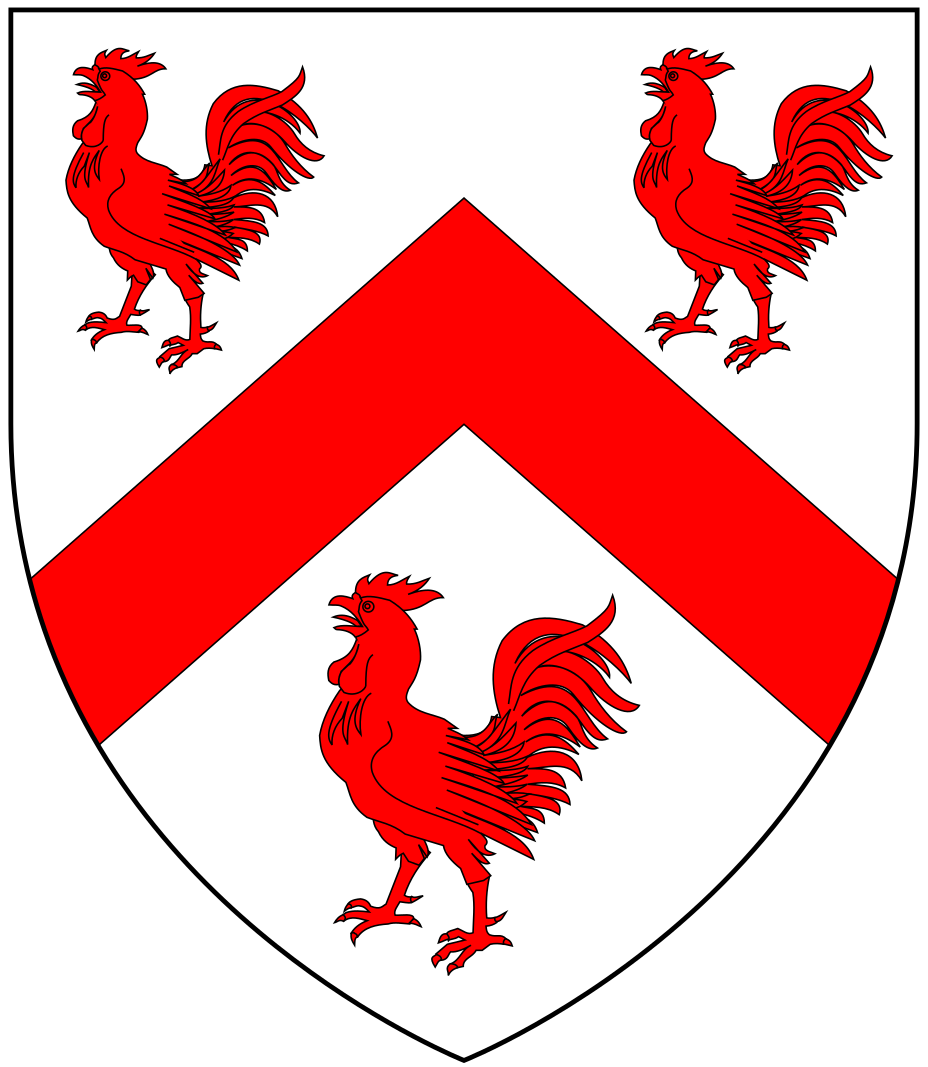
Arms of Cockworthy: Argent, a chevron between three cocks gules, as seen in Buckland Filleigh Church

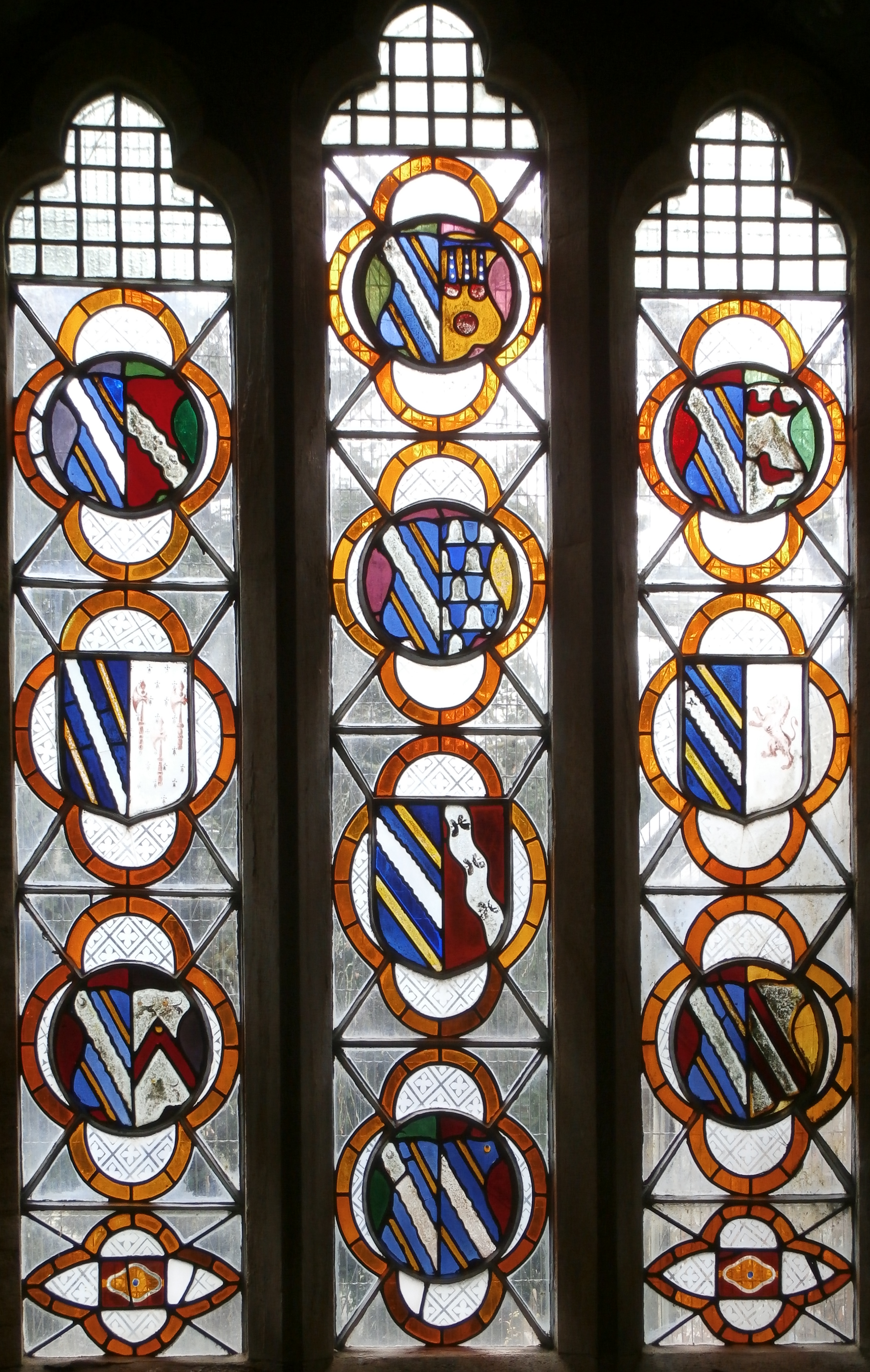
Ancient heraldic stained glass moved in about 1838 from Spriddleston to Buckland Filleigh Church. Showing the arms of Fortescue impaling the arms of various wives. Rev. Richard Lane (d.1858) of Coffleet, Vicar of Brixton, and owner of Spridleston, noted as follows: "The windows in the front of the house were ornamented with a variety of armorial bearings in painted glass which were taken down a few years since and given to John Inglett-Fortescue late of Buckland Filleigh who placed them in his parish church"

John Fortescue (d.1538), who was given Spridleston by his father. He married Alice Cockworthy, a daughter of John Cockworthy of Cockworthy (today "Cogworthy") in the parish of Yarnscombe in Devon. The canting arms of Cockworthy Argent, a chevron between three cocks gules were displayed impaled by Fortescue in a 16th-century stained glass window in Spridleston Hall, with several other similar heraldic shields, all in about 1838 removed to the parish church of Buckland Filleigh in Devon, a seat of another branch of the Fortescue family which had inherited Spridleston by marriage. One of the younger sons of John Fortescue (d.1538) was Sir Nicholas Fortescue, Groom Porter to Henry VIII, who in 1542 obtained as his seat Cookhill Priory in Worcestershire and was the grandfather of Sir Nicholas Fortescue (c.1575-1633), a Chamberlain of the Exchequer.

Another younger son of John Fortescue (d.1538) was Lewis Fortescue (d.1545) a Baron of the Exchequer, who married his cousin Elizabeth Fortescue, daughter and heiress of John Fortescue of Fallapit in the parish of East Allington, descended from John Fortescue (died after 1432), Captain of Castle of Meaux. Lewis's male descendants remained at Fallapit until 1734, and continued thence via a female line, and included Edmund Fortescue (1560–1624) of Fallapit, a Member of Parliament and ancestor of Sir Edmund Fortescue, 1st Baronet (1642-1666).

The descent of Spridleston from John Fortescue (d.1538) was as follows:

- Richard Fortescue, eldest son and heir, who married Elizabeth Knolles (d.1550), a daughter and co-heiress of Robert Knolles of North Mymms, Hertfordshire.
- John Fortescue (born 1516), son and heir, who married Florence Vivian, a daughter of John Vivian of Trelowarren in Cornwall.
- John Fortescue (d.1602), son and heir, who married Joan Shapleigh, a daughter of Robert Shapleigh of Dartmouth in Devon, and sister of John Shapleigh (d.1628) of Totnes, Mayor of Dartmouth and twice Mayor of Totnes, whose monument survives in St Saviour's Church, Dartmouth.
- John Fortescue (1580-1612), son and heir, who married a daughter of the Pitt family.
- John Fortescue (born 1610), son and heir, who married a certain Joan (d.1680) and buried at Brixton.
- Edward Fortescue (d.1702), son and heir, who in 1667 married Dorothy Crossing (born 1637), a daughter and co-heiress of Richard Crossing of Exeter (by his wife Elizabeth Dodderidge, a daughter of Pentecost Dodderidge (died c. 1650) of Barnstaple in North Devon, three times a Member of Parliament for Barnstaple in 1621, 1624 and 1625), nephew of Hugh Crossing, Mayor of Exeter in 1620.
- Edward Fortescue (1673-1702), 2nd son and heir, who gave Spridleston to his 5th sister Rebecca Fortescue (born 1676), wife of their cousin George Fortescue of Tavistock.

=== Fortescue of Tavistock & Buckland Filleigh ===
- George Fortescue of Tavistock, inherited Spridleston on his marriage to his cousin Rebecca Fortescue (born 1676). He was the third son of William Fortescue (1622–1680) of Buckland Filleigh in Devon and younger brother of Henry Fortescue (1659–1691) of Buckland Filleigh.
- John Fortescue (1700-1776) of Bampton, Oxfordshire, and of Spridleston, son and heir, who in 1752 inherited the manor of Buckland Filleigh on the death of his cousin Mary Spooner. He died unmarried and was buried at Brixton. His heir was his nephew Richard Inglett "Fortescue" (1731–1790), son of his sister Rebecca Fortescue (1699–1764) by her husband Caleb Inglett (died 1752) of Dawlish and of Chudleigh.

=== Inglett-Fortescue ===
==== Richard Inglett "Fortescue" (1731–1790) ====
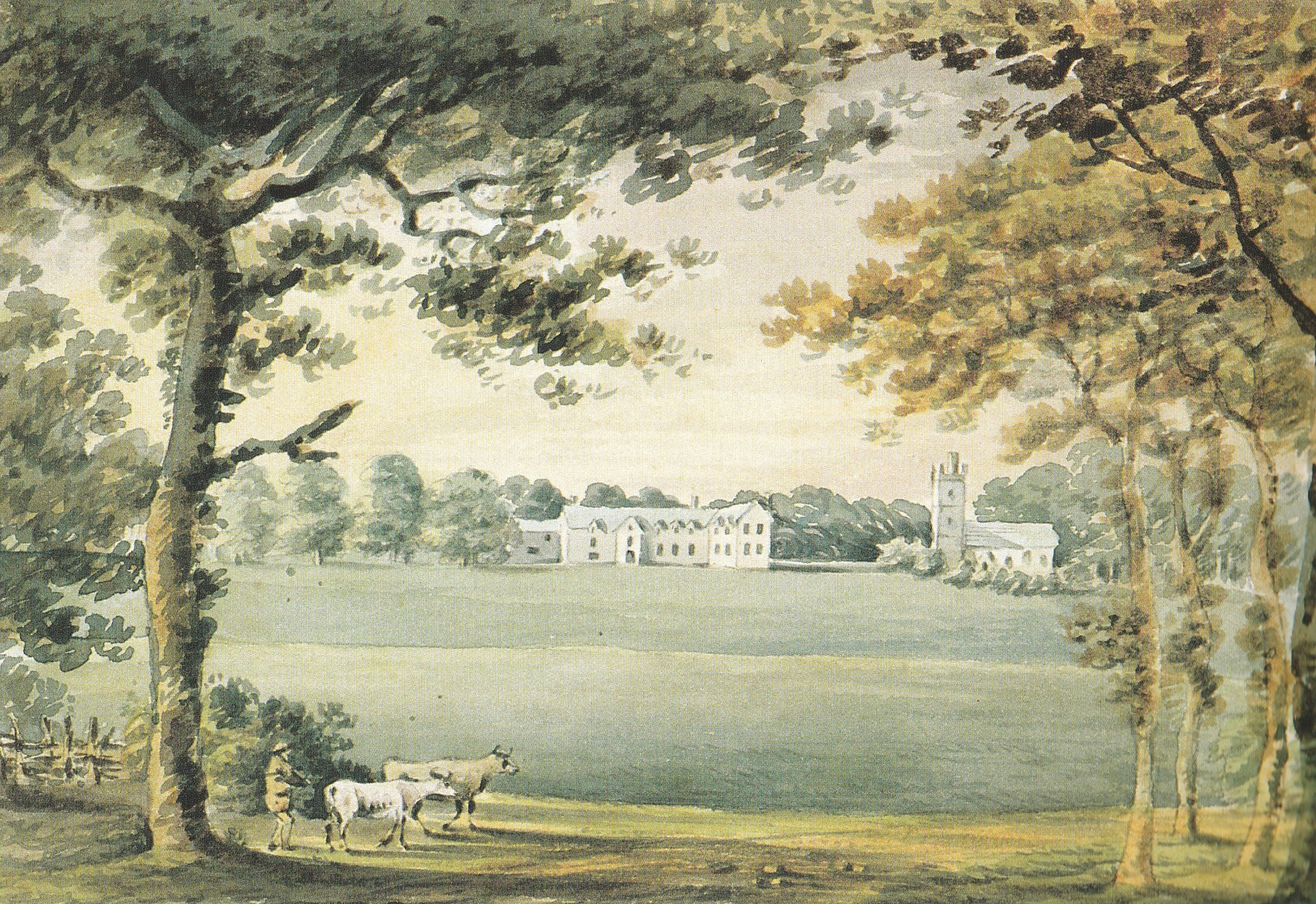
1797 watercolour of Buckland Filleigh House, Devon (south front), by Rev. John Swete (died 1821). The house burned down the next year (1798) and was rebuilt circa 1810 by John Inglett Fortescue (died 1841) (son of Richard Inglett Fortescue) in the neo-classical style, which building survives today

Richard Inglett "Fortescue" (1731–1790) (nephew), who on inheriting his uncle's estates including Buckland Filleigh assumed by royal licence in 1766 the surname Fortescue. He was a collector of customs. He was the eldest son of Caleb Inglett (died 1752) of Dawlish by his wife Rebecca Fortescue (1699–1764), sister of John Fortescue (1700–1776) of Buckland Filleigh. He married Elizabeth Weston, daughter of Lucy Weston. In 1785 he sold Spridleston to Thomas Lane of Coffleet in Devon.

=== Lane ===
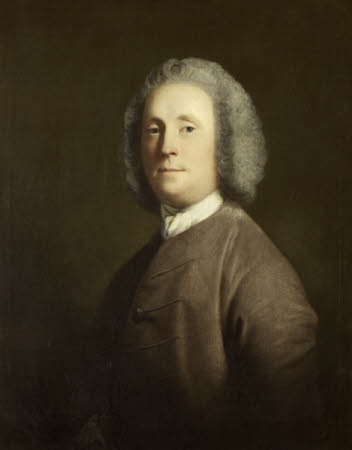
Thomas Lane (1741/2 -1817), 1762/4 portrait by Sir Joshua Reynolds, Stourhead House, Wiltshire

Arms of Lane: Per pale gules and azure, three saltires argent

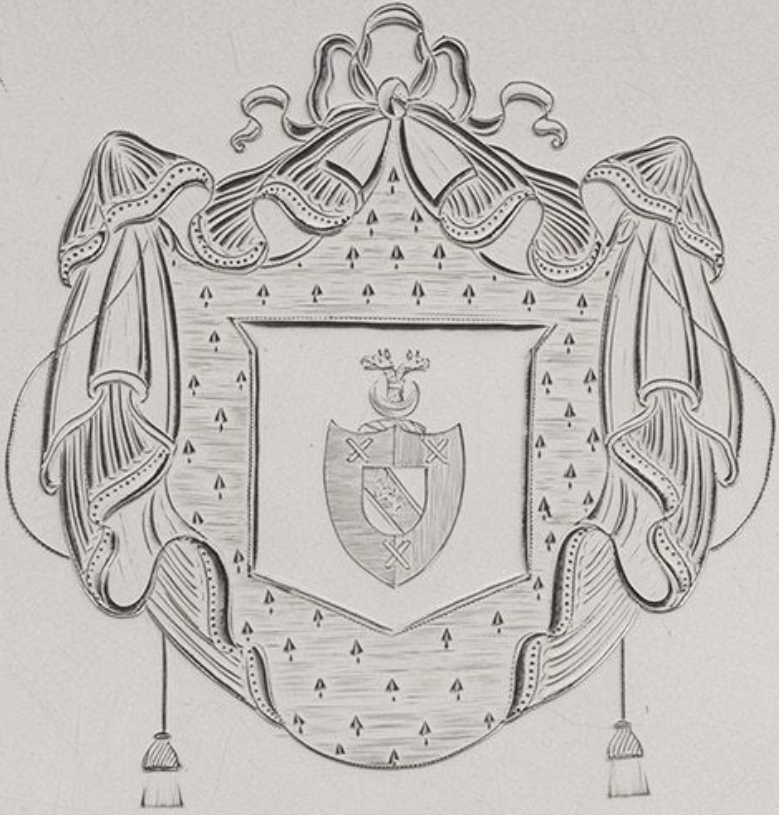
Arms of Thomas Lane, being Lane with an inescutcheon of pretence for Tothill of Peamore, Exminster and of Bagtor: Azure, on a bend argent cotised or a lion passant sable Engraving on a silver tray made in 1973 by Crouch and Hannam silversmiths, London

Thomas Lane (1741/2–1817), of Coffleet in Devon, purchased Spridleston in 1785 from Richard Inglett Fortescue of Buckland Filleigh. His portrait by Sir Joshua Reynolds survives at Stourhead House in Wiltshire. He was the nephew and heir of Thomas Veale (d.1780), a wealthy attorney-at-law at Plymouth, of Coffleet in the parish of Yealmpton, which estate adjoined Spridleston and was largely surrounded by the parish of Brixton. Thomas Lane was the son of Richard Lane by his wife Charity Veale, sister of Thomas Veale.

Thomas Veale married twice, firstly to Jenny Elford, a daughter of John Elford (d.1732) of Plymouth, and secondly to Penelope Hill, a daughter of John Hill of Lydcott in Cornwall and widow of Rev. Thomas Tothill. His only child died young and he thus bequeathed his fortune to his nephew, which included the manors of Brixton English, Teignwick and Bradley in Newton Abbot. Veale was a friend of Sir Joshua Reynolds, born and raised at Plympton, near Plymouth, in Devon, and owned several paintings by him. In 1762 Reynolds brought his London friend Samuel Johnson to Devon for a holiday, and introduced him to friends, including Veale, with whom they lodged at Coffleet the nights of September 2 and 4, having in the interval stayed at nearby Kitley with William Bastard (1727–1782) (father of Edmund Bastard (1758–1816) a Member of Parliament for Dartmouth). Veale had a particular interest in religion (as did Samuel Johnson) and was admitted a member of the Society for the Promotion of Christian Knowledge in 1752.

The cleric Zachariah Mudge (1694–1769) died at Coffleet in 1769. Thomas Lane erected a monument to his uncle in St Bartholomew's Church, Yealmpton, now high up on the south wall of the chancel, inscribed as follows:

Sacred to the memory of Thomas Veale Esq of Coffleet who died 1st Feb 1780. This bust was raised by his nephew and successor Thomas Lane, Esqr., in 1782, and placed in its present position by the Rev. R. Lane on the rebuilding of the Church Anno Domini 1852.

Thomas Lane served as Sheriff of Devon in 1784, and married Penelope Tothill, daughter and heiress of Rev. Thomas Tothill of Bagtor in the parish of Ilsington in Devon, by whom he had issue Rev. Richard Lane (d. 1848), Vicar of Brixton, and Penelope Lane. Richard Lane married Lucy Dennis, a daughter of Nicholas Dennis of Ashley near Tiverton, descended from the Dennis family of Orleigh, Buckland Brewer, and had issue one son and four daughters. He is said to have been a lavish spender and to pay his debts he sold Bradley in 1841 and in 1848 mortgaged Coffleet to the trustees of the adjoining Kitley Estate.

In 1822 Spridleston was stated by Lysons to belong to Rev. Richard Lane, but the "old mansion of the Fortescues" was then inhabited by a farmer. Rev. Richard Lane made notes on the history of Spridleston which survive, dated 1838, recording the estate at 345 acres. Rev. Richard Lane's son Thomas Veale Lane (d. 1888) married Juliana Sarah Pellew, a daughter of Pownoll Bastard Pellew, 2nd Viscount Exmouth. Thomas Veale Lane's daughter Julia Lucy Lane married Henry Arthur Hoare (1804–1873), of Wavendon House, Buckinghamshire, High Sheriff of Buckinghamshire in 1865, a son of the banker Sir Henry Hoare, 3rd Baronet. The portrait of Thomas Lane by Reynolds was inherited by Julia Lucy Lane, the mother of Sir Henry Hugh Arthur Hoare, 6th Baronet (1865–1947), who in 1946 gave Stourhead with all its contents to the National Trust.
