= Brixton, Devon =

Village in Devon, England

Coordinates: 50°21′N 4°2′W

Brixton
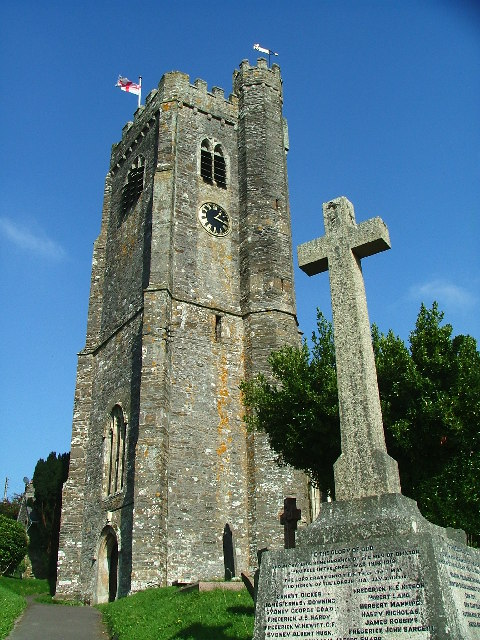
- St. Mary's Church, Brixton

- Location within Devon
- Population: 1,207
- Civil parish: Brixton
- District: South Hams
- Shire county: Devon
- Region: South West
- Country: England
- Sovereign state: United Kingdom

Brixton is a village, parish and former manor situated near Plymouth in South Hams, Devon, England. It is located on the A379 Plymouth to Kingsbridge road and is about 6 miles (9.7 km) from Plymouth. Its population is 1207. The parish contains the former manors of Brixton Reigny and Brixton English.

It has views of the River Yealm. The church was built in the 15th century, with a tower arch 200 years older. Brixton has a single primary school, St Mary's Church of England Primary School.

== History ==
Brixton appears as Brictricestone in the Domesday Book of 1086, where it is recorded in the ancient hundred of Plympton, having been divided into two moieties at or before 1066, wherewith two brothers who supported William the Conqueror could be separately compensated as lords, as was done for the brothers in other Devonshire parishes. But in this locale, only one of the brothers was lord of both moieties by the time of the Domesday Survey in 1086. One moiety was recorded as a manor having 4 villagers and 2 smallholders, and livestock consisting of 7 pigs and 31 sheep. Its annual value to the lord Ralph de Pomeroy was given as 10 shillings. The immediate lord then paid taxes to the tenant-in-chief, Iudhael of Totnes, who held the parish directly from the crown. The other moiety was recorded as a manor having 4 villagers and 5 small holders, and livestock consisting of 80 sheep and 1 "other" animal. Its annual value to the lord Ralph de Pomeroy was given as 15 shillings. The immediate lord then paid taxes to the tenant-in-chief, the same Iudhael of Totnes, who held the parish directly from the crown.

The name 'Brixton' derives from the early Brictricestone, as recorded in the Domesday Book, assumed recently (2024) to be the name given to the village by the Norman de Britrickstone family. William White's 1879 gazetteer features a different spelling for the surname: "The manor of Brixton, anciently called Britricheston, was long held by a family of its own name, but was dismembered many years ago." A more learned source mentions Brictricestone being derived from 'Stone of Beorhtric'.

The church, St Mary's, dates from the 15th century, and suffered a number of dilapidations and subsequent restorations in the 1880s and 1890s.

In William White's 1879 History, Gazetteer and Directory of the County of Devon, Brixton was said to have had 698 residents (325 males, 373 females) in 1871, living in 147 houses.

== Historic estates ==
The parish contains various historic estates including:

- Spridleston, formerly a seat of a junior branch of the Fortescue family of Whympston, Modbury.
- Hareston, formerly the seat of the Wood family.

== External sources ==
- Brixton at GENUKI
- Pictures of Brixton
