= Church of St Mary, Great Baddow =

Church in Essex, England

Church of St Mary the Virgin
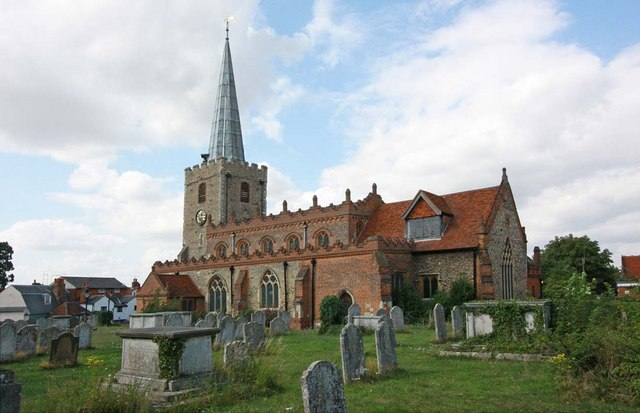

- Location in Essex
- 51°42′57″N 0°30′08″E
- Denomination: Church of England
- Website: St Mary's Great Baddow

History
- Dedication: St Mary

Architecture
- Functional status: Church of England parish church
- Heritage designation: Grade I
- Designated: 10 April 1967
- Style: Gothic

Administration
- Province: Canterbury
- Diocese: Chelmsford
- Parish: Great Baddow

Clergy
- Vicar: Rev Andy Greaves-Brown

St Mary's Church is an active parish church in the village of Great Baddow, Essex, England. The church stands on the High Street in the centre of the village and dates from the 12th century. Much extended in the 16th century, and heavily restored in the 19th and 20th centuries, the church is a Grade I listed building. It is currently in a state of interregnum, after the former team rector Tim Ball left the church in 2024.

== History ==
The urban village of Great Baddow stands within the boundaries of the City of Chelmsford. (Note: Richard de Badewe, from whose family name the title of the village may derive, was born in Great Baddow in the later 1200s. Rising to the post of Chancellor of the University of Cambridge, he founded University Hall, Cambridge, now Clare College. Other sources suggest that the settlement derives its name from the Celtic for the River Chelmer.) (Note: The lordship of the manor of Great Baddow is now held by Tony Appleton, unofficial town crier to the British royal family.) In his Essex Directory of 1848, William White described it as "one of the handsomest villages in Essex". The Church of St Mary dates from the 12th century. In the 14th century, the churchyard at St Mary's was the gathering place of a contingent of men from Essex, who then marched south to London to join Wat Tyler in the Peasants' Revolt. The building was enhanced and extended in the 16th century, with brickwork of high quality. A major restoration in the 19th century, was followed in the 20th by further renovations and reordering of the interior.

St Mary's contains a notable monument to the Gwyn sisters and their friend Ann Antrim by Henry Cheere. Another monument honours Major-general Sir Nicholas Trant, who served under the Duke of Wellington in the Peninsular War. A soldier of considerable daring, Wellington described him as, "a very good officer, but as drunk a dog as ever lived." St Mary's has memorial plaques to the men of Great Baddow who died in the First and the Second World Wars. In September 2022, the church was the starting point for a commemorative walk, ending at Chelmsford Cathedral, for families, mainly from Essex, who had lost children to violent crime.

=== State of interregnum ===
The church remains an active parish church (Note: The former team rector, the Rev. Canon Timothy Ball, was converted to Christianity after attending services at St Mary's in the 1980s.) in the Diocese of Chelmsford, despite the fact that it is currently without a team rector. The former team rector, the Rev. Canon Tim Ball, retired from St. Mary's in December 2024, leaving the position vacant; after multiple rounds of advertisement, there have been no applications for the position.

Team vicar Andy Greaves-Brown therefore acts as the only member of the St. Mary's ministry team, working half-time in Baddow and half-time in Springfield's Church of Our Saviour. Alongside him, retired ministers and volunteers are also active in the ministry.

== Architecture ==
Historic England gives a foundation date for the church as the 12th century. The chancel dates from the 13th century and the tower from the 14th. Major expansion of the building occurred in the early 16th century. James Bettley, in the Essex volume of the Pevsner Buildings of England series, considered the church exterior "splendid", due largely to its Tudor brickwork dating from this time. The remainder of the construction material is flint rubble.

A Victorian renovation was undertaken by C. and W. H. Pertwee between 1892 and 1903. Further modifications were made in the 20th century. Internally, the pulpit is early 16th century. Nikolaus Pevsner thought it, "the best of its date in the county". The church is a Grade I listed building.

The churchyard contains the Duffield Memorial. Designed by Herbert Maryon in 1912, it commemorates a prominent local solicitor, William Ward Duffield, his wife, Marianne and their son. The lychgate to the churchyard is by Ninian Comper and dates from 1930.

== Gallery ==
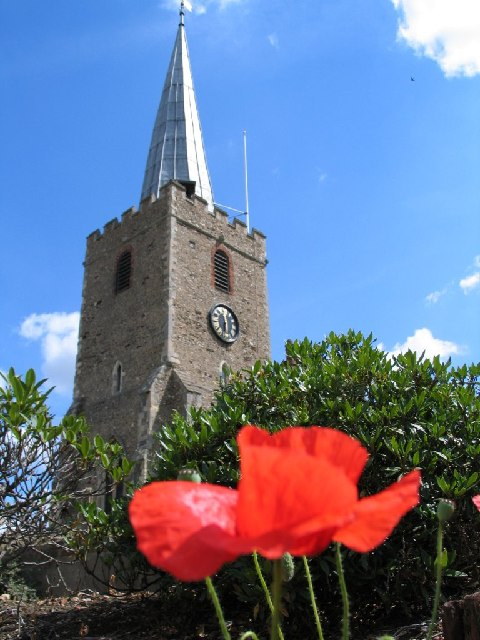
The west tower - dating from the 14th century

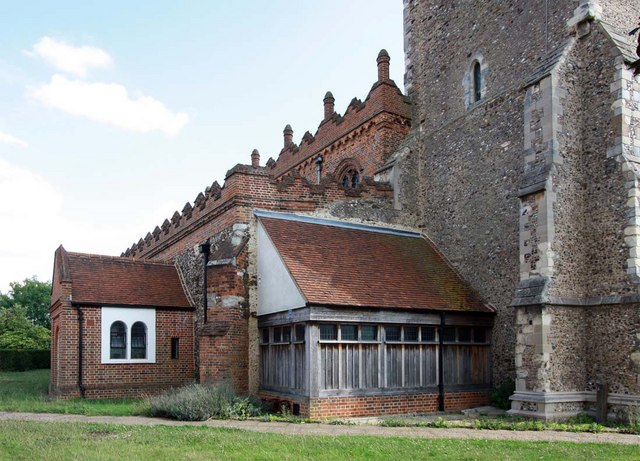
The 20th century porch

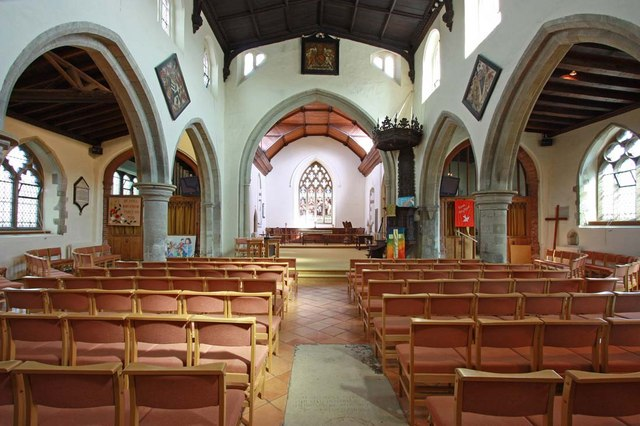
The interior looking to the east end

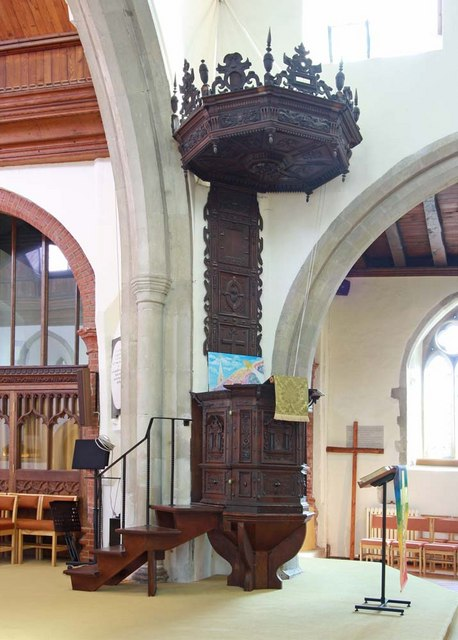
The pulpit - much admired by Pevsner

== See also ==
- Media related to St Mary the Virgin's Church, Great Baddow at Wikimedia Commons
- Essex Churches - St Mary's Great Baddow
- Duffield Memorial

== Sources ==
- Bromley, Janet; Bromley, David (2016). Wellington's Men Remembered: A Register of Memorials to Soldiers Who Fought in the Peninsular War and at Waterloo. Vol. 2 (M-Z). Barnsley, UK: Pen & Sword. ISBN 978-1-473-85768-1.
- Glover, Michael (2001). The Peninsular War 1807-1814. London: Penguin Books. ISBN 0-14-139041-7.
- Bettley, James; Pevsner, Nikolaus (2007). Essex. The Buildings of England. New Haven, US and London: Yale University Press. ISBN 978-0-300-11614-4. OCLC 1042848015.
- Reeve (2021). Chelmsford in 50 Buildings. Stroud, UK: Amberley Press. ISBN 978-1-398-10686-4.
- White, William (1848). Great Baddow. London: White's Directories. OCLC 35158908.
