= Whympston =

Historic manor in Devon, England

Coordinates: 50.337°N 3.876°W

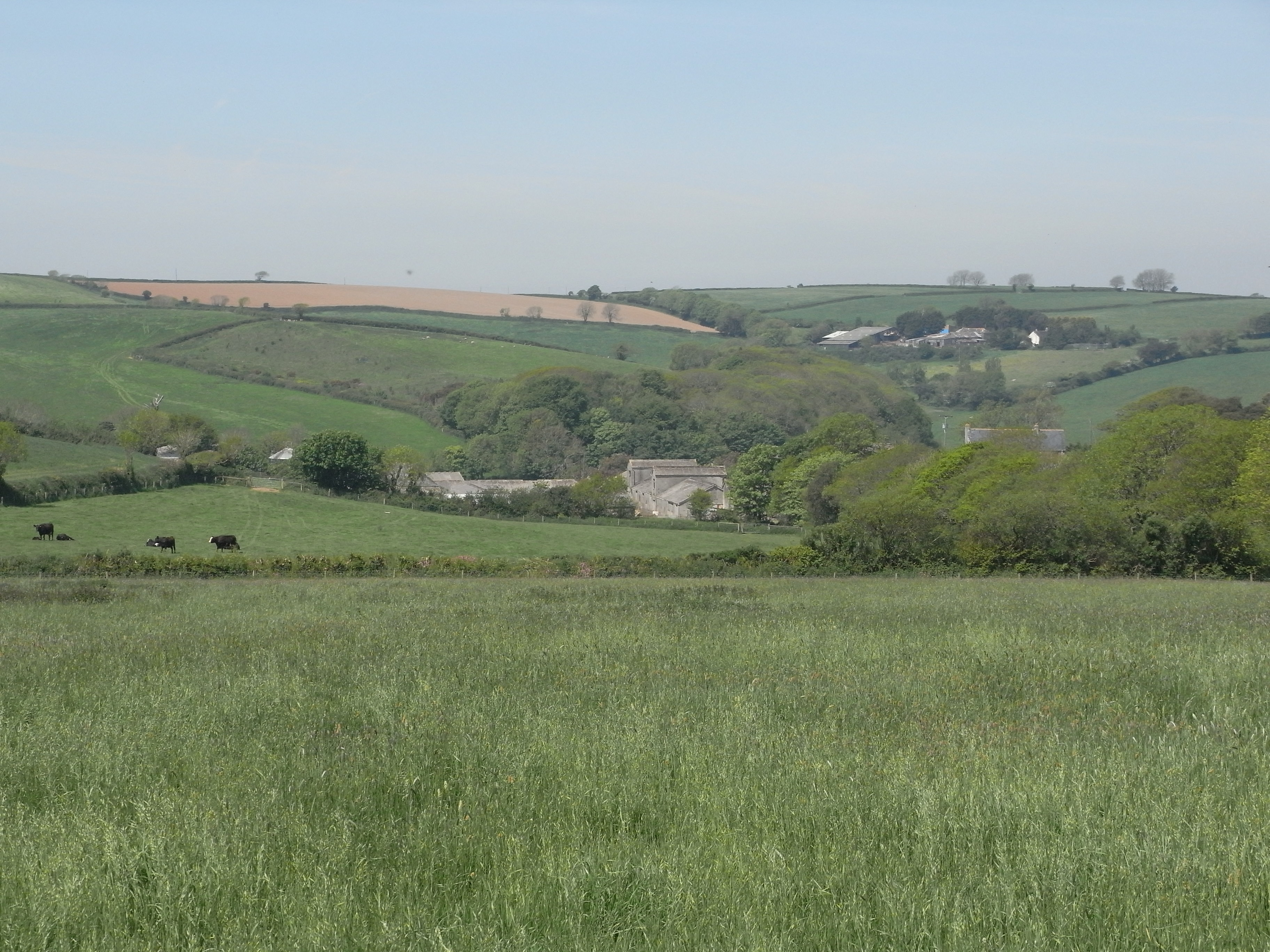
Whympston Farm, 1 mile SE of Modbury, Devon, that once belonged to the Fortescue family

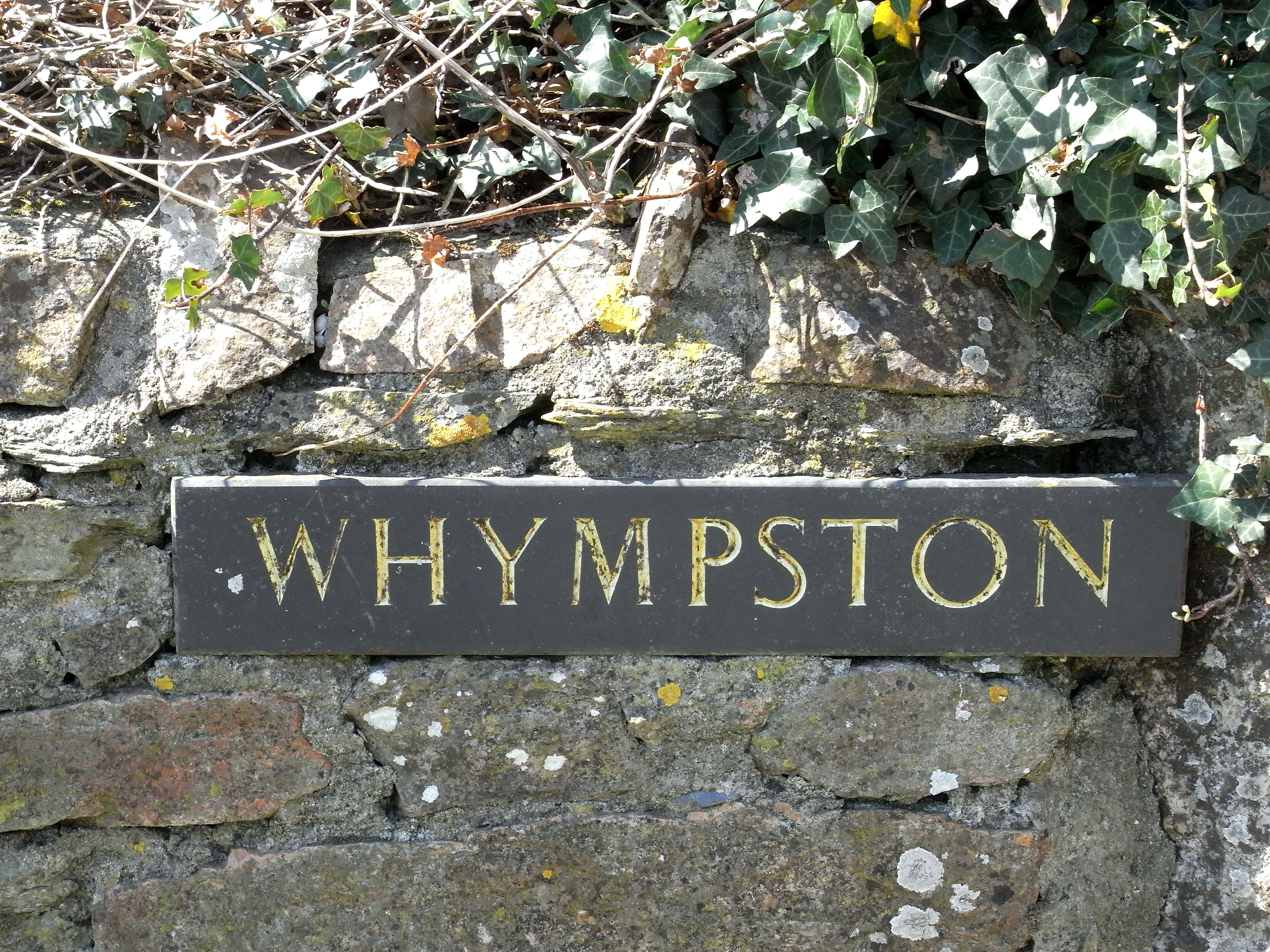
Sign at entrance to Whympston Farm

Map showing some of the historic properties of the Fortescue family in South Devon

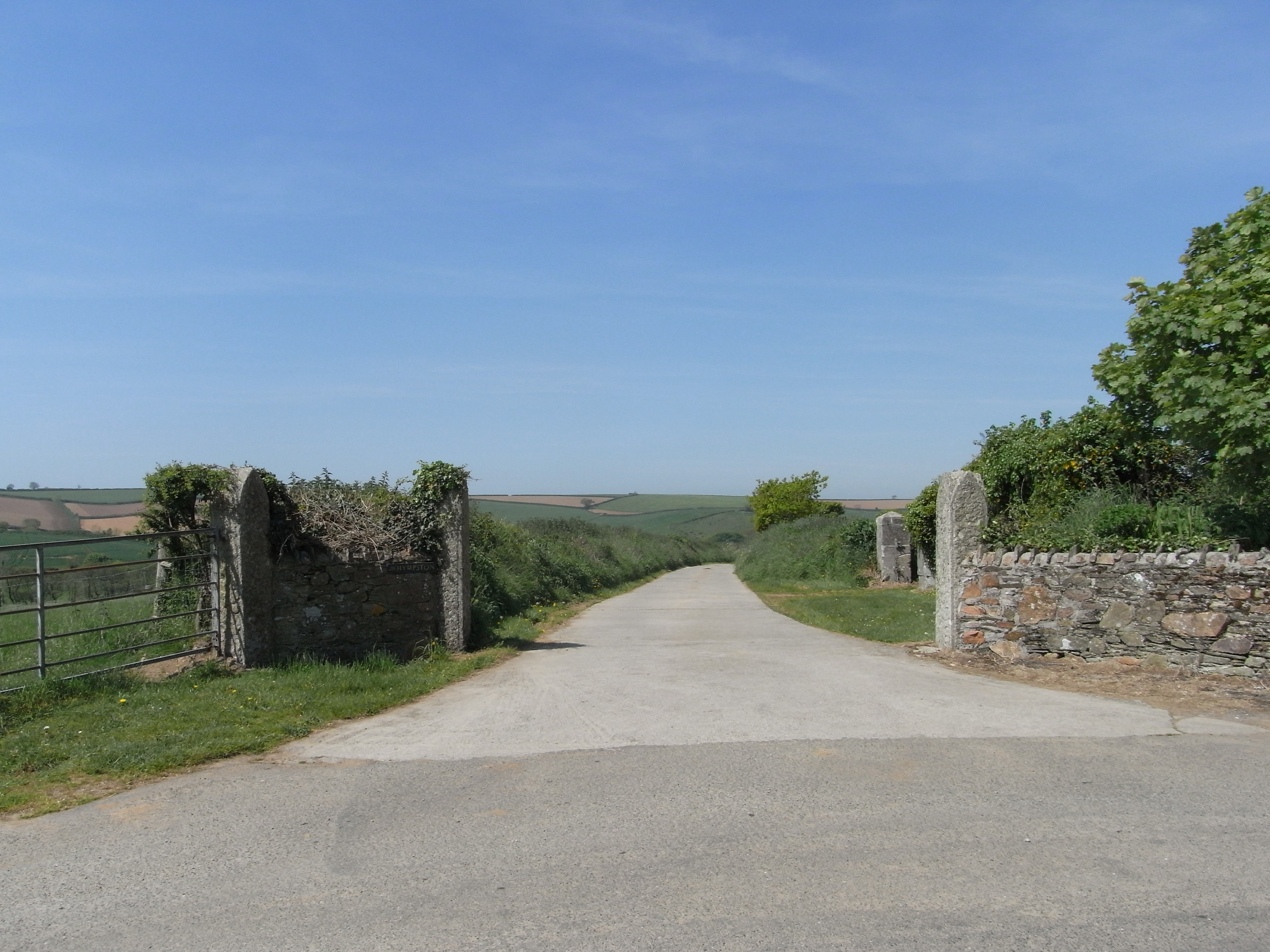
Entrance to Whympston Farm

Whympston in the parish of Modbury in Devon, England, was a historic manor that belonged to the Fortescue family.

== Descent ==
=== Fortescue ===
As the 17th-century Fortescue mural monument in the parish church of Weare Giffard (see below) states, "Whympstone" (modern spelling "Whympston") in the parish of Modbury is the oldest known home of the Fortescue family. The manor of Whympston is thought to have been granted to them by King John in 1209, but according to Hoskins they were already in the district in about 1140, when Ralph Fortescue donated some land to Modbury Priory at about the time of its foundation.

==== William Fortescue (died post-1406) ====
Arms of Beauchamp of Ryme: Vair, as seen in Fortescue heraldic window in Buckland Filleigh Church

William Fortescue (died post-1406), of Whympston married Elizabeth Beauchamp, widow of Richard Branscombe, a daughter of Sir John Beauchamp of Ryme in Dorset by his wife Margaret Whalesborough, and a co-heiress of her brother Thomas Beauchamp of Ryme. The Beauchamp family of Ryme was a junior branch of the Beauchamp feudal barons of Hatch Beauchamp in Somerset. Thomas Beauchamp died without children, when his heirs to one moiety each became the descendants of his two sisters, the other of whom was Joane Beauchamp, wife of Sir Robert Challons, from whom the moiety descended to a member of the Carwithan family. The younger son of William Fortescue and Elizabeth Beauchamp was John Fortescue (died after 1432), of Sheepham in the parish of Modbury, Captain of the captured Castle of Meaux, during the Hundred Years' War, ancestor of the Fortescues of Filleigh and Weare Giffard in Devon (see Earl Fortescue) and of the Fortescues of Buckland Filleigh, Devon (see Earl of Clermont). These three prominent seats of the Fortescue family were all inherited by the marriage of Martin Fortescue (d.1472) (son of Sir John Fortescue (c.1394-1479) of Ebrington in Gloucestershire, Chief Justice of the King's Bench, 2nd son of John Fortescue, Captain of Meaux) to Elizabeth Densyll, daughter and heiress of Richard Densyll.

==== William Fortescue (fl.1410, d.pre-1440) ====
Arms of Falwell: Gules, on a bend wavy argent three water bougets sable, as seen in Fortescue heraldic window in Buckland Filleigh Church

William Fortescue (fl.1410, d.pre-1440) of Whympston, eldest son and heir, who married Mabell (or Isabel) Falwell, a daughter and co-heiress of John Falwell, of Falwell (today Velwell) in the parish of Rattery in Devon. In 1410 William and his wife, "Matilda, alias Mabilia," and his parents were granted a license by Edmund Stafford, Bishop of Exeter, for an oratory in their mansion at "Whympton". A fine dated 1425 records that John Falwell and his wife Agnes settled lands on themselves for life, with successive remainders on their daughter Mabel, wife of William Fortescue, and her heirs; on George Denysyll (alias Densyll) and Agnes his wife (evidently another daughter of John Falwell and his wife Agnes) and their heirs, and on John Boson (evidently a nephew of John Falwell) and his heirs. Mabel Falwell survived him and remarried to John Trumpyngdon.

==== John Fortescue ====
John Fortescue of Whympston, son, was a Member of Parliament successively for Totnes, Tavistock and Plympton. He married Jane Preston (d.1501), who survived him, daughter and heiress of John Preston of Preston in the parish of Newton Ferrers in Devon. By his wife he had several children:

- John Fortescue (d.1519) of Whympston, eldest son and heir, who continued the senior line of the family at that ancient seat. His descendants were not prominent. He married Isabell Gibbes, daughter of Thomas Gibbes of Fenton.
- Joan Fortescue (d. 1524), who married John Hext Sr.
- William Fortescue (d.1519/20), 2nd son, whose descendants founded a line of the family at Preston, the inheritance of his mother Jane Preston.
- John Fortescue (d.1538), 3rd son, of Spridleston in the parish of Brixton, Devon, which manor was given to him by his father, and where he founded his own branch of the family.

=== Fortescue monument, Weare Giffard ===
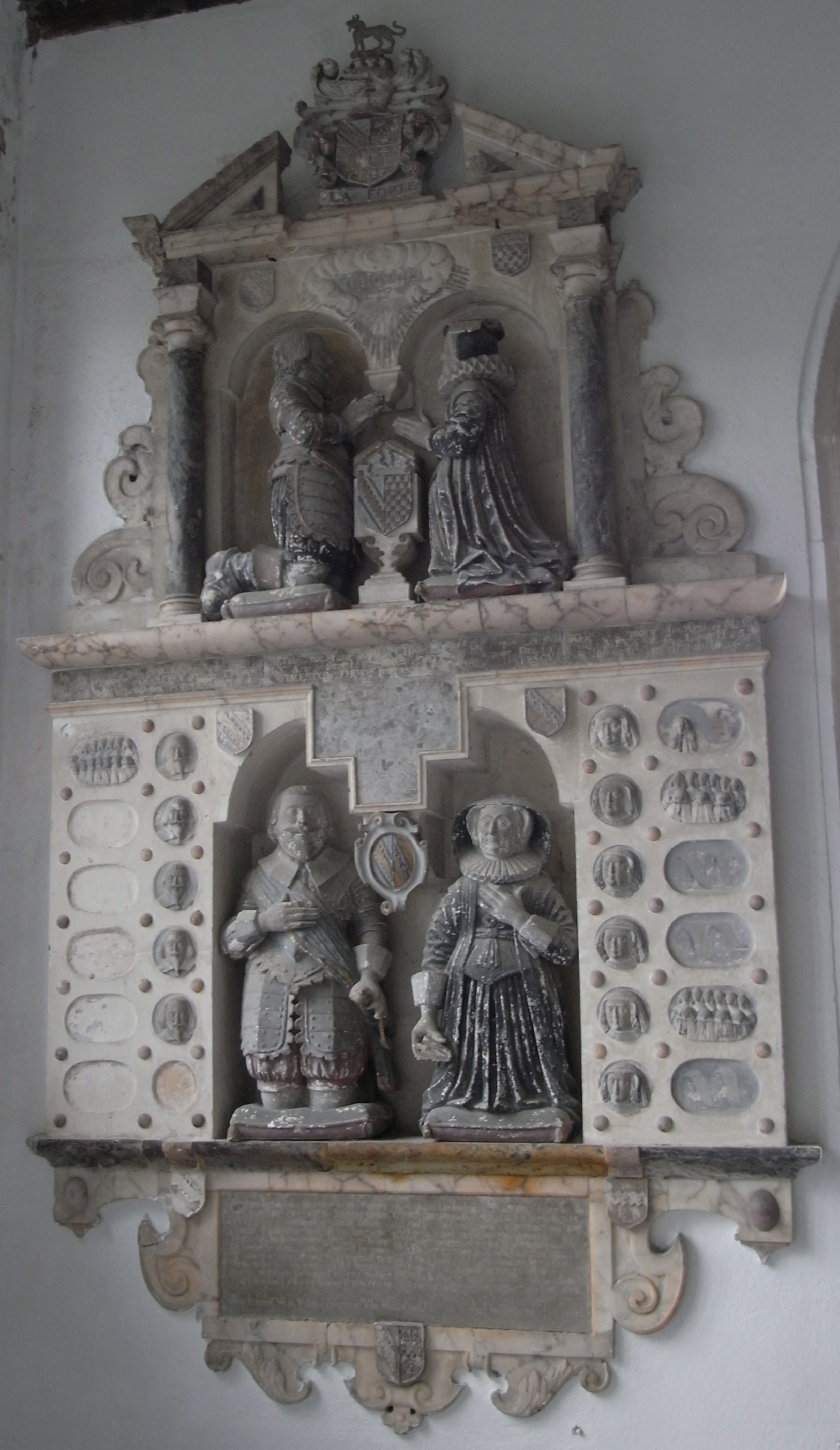
1638 Mural monument in Weare Giffard Church to three generations of the Fortescue family, which mentions the family origins at Whympston. South wall of south aisle chapel ("Fortescue Chapel")

On the south wall of the south aisle chapel ("Fortescue Chapel") of the parish church of Weare Giffard is affixed the Fortescue mural monument, erected in 1638 by Hugh Fortescue (1592-1661). Inscribed across the monument at the top of the lower (second) tier is the following Latin text, which summarises the history of the Fortescue family:

Memoriale Hugonis Fortescue arm(igeris) et Elizabethae ux(oris) filiae Joh(anni)s Chichester Equit(is) itemque Joh(ann)is Fortescue eorum fil(ii) arm(igeris) et Mariae ux(oris) filiae Humphredi Speccot de Thornbury arm(igeris) Sunt hi ab Joh(ann)e Fortescue Equite Duce castri de Meaux in Gall(ia) sub H(enrico) 5.o (Quinto) oriundi qui praesepia Fortescutorum de Wimeston Devon ortus habuit fil(ium) Joh(ann)em Summum Justic(ium) et Cancell(arium) sub H(enrico) 6.o (Sexto) sepultum Ebertoniae Glocest(ria) Familia quidem perantiqua et etiamnum felici subole propagata sepulti sunt: Hugo, Aug. 2 1600; Joh(ann)es April 5, 1605: Elizabetha May 7, 1630; Maria April 11, 1637.

Which may be translated literally as:

"In memory of Hugh Fortescue, Esquire, and of Elizabeth his wife, daughter of John Chichester Esquire and also of John Fortescue, the son of them, Esquire, and of Mary his wife, daughter of Humphrey Speccot of Thornbury, Esquire. These arose from John Fortescue, Knight, Captain of the Castle of Meaux in France, arisen under Henry the Fifth a scion of the Fortescues of Whympston, Devon. He had a son John, Chief Justice and Chancellor under Henry the Sixth. He was buried at Ebrington in Gloucestershire. Indeed the very ancient family even now is happy with fruitful issue and are buried here: Hugo, Aug. 2 1600; John April 5, 1605: Elizabeth May 7, 1630; Mary April 11, 1637"

The Fortescue family sold the estate shortly before 1600.

=== Treby ===
Writing in 1797 Swete stated it was then owned by Paul Treby Esq. (1758-1832) of Plympton House.

=== Prettejohn ===
Walter Lamble Prettejohn (1787-1850) purchased the estate from Paul Treby and at some time before 1810 built a new house on the estate. His memorial plaque survives in Chivelstone Church, inscribed as follows:

"Sacred to the memory of Walter Lamble Prettejohn late of Whymston in the Parish of Modbury son of Walter Prettejohn formerly of South Allington in this parish who departed this life the 7th of April 1850 aged 63 years".

The co-executrix to his will was his niece Elizabeth Prettejohn Pitts of Chivelstone, wife of Nicholas Pitts, Gentleman, and only child of his sister Elizabeth Harris.

=== Pitts ===
In 1862 the estate was owned by Nicholas Pitts of South Allington.

=== Plymouth Co-Operative Society ===
The country mansion called Whympston House was purchased in 1916 by the Plymouth Co-Operative Society Ltd as a holiday home for its members. The sale catalogue of 1915 lists the following:

"Whympston Estate, Stubston Estate, Lower Little Modbury Estate, Stoliford Estate, Challonscoombe Estate, Damerelscoombe Estate, Easton Estate, Bray's Wood (otherwise Braieswood) Tenement, Houghton Estate, Chantry Estate, Idestone Estate, Great Gate Estate, Alston Estate, fields called Tongue and South Down, several fields with barn and cattle linhays near Idestone Cross, Will Street meadow and pond in Loddiswell, Modbury, Aveton Gifford, Bigbury, Loddiswell and Malborough"

In 1925 the Co-Op sold the estate, as detailed in a sale catalogue of that year:

"Whympston Estate including Stoliford Farm; Lower Little Modbury Farm; Stubston Farm; Whympston House and Farm, Modbury"

=== Present day ===
The site in 2012 at the end of a private lane marked "Whympston" comprises a small settlement of a modern-looking farmhouse with older farm buildings and two modern bungalows nearby. No trace of the former mansion house remains.
