= Duffield Memorial =

Memorial in Great Baddow, Essex, England

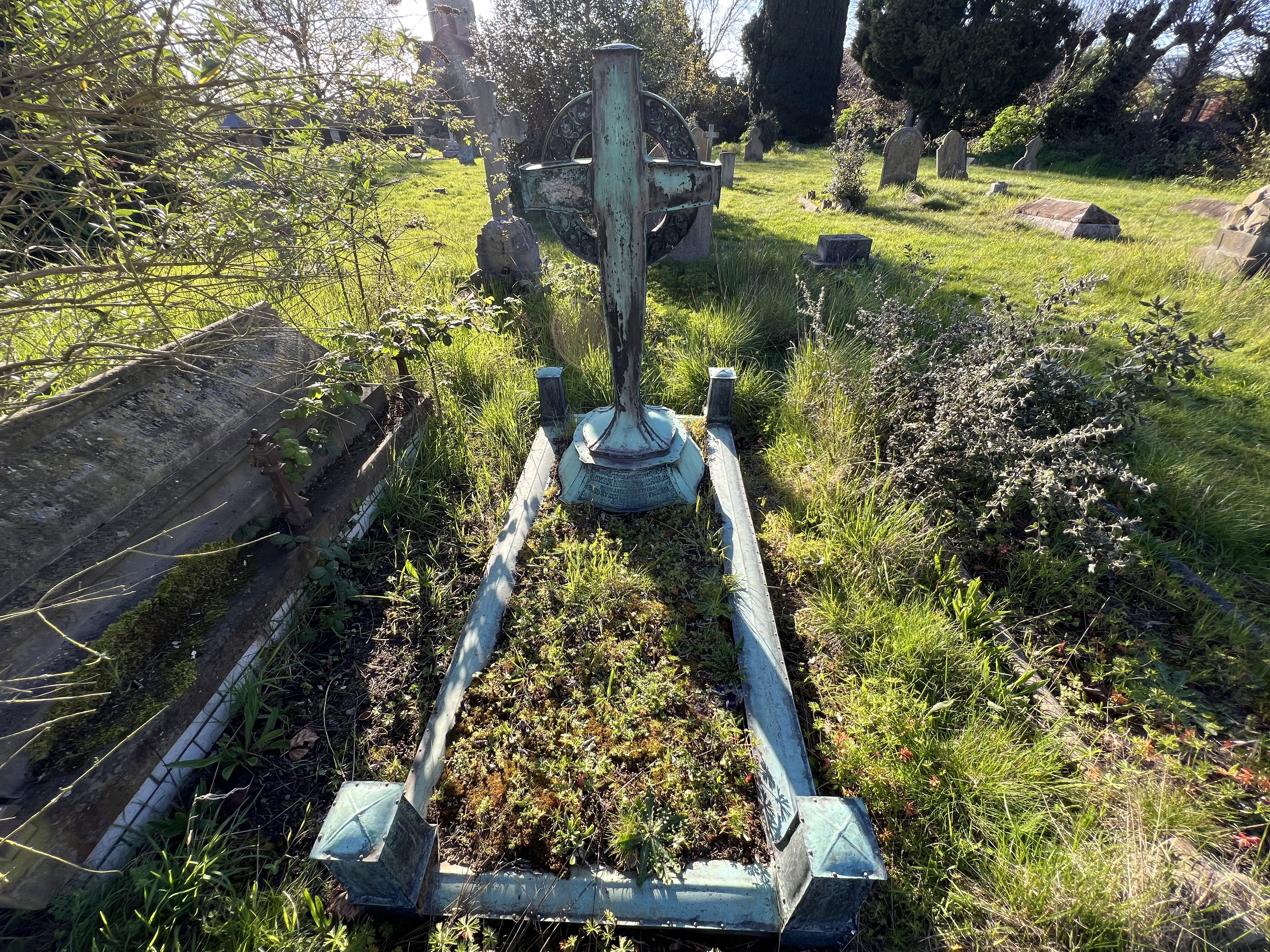
- Duffield Memorial (pictured 2023) in St Mary's Church, Great Baddow
- Artist: Herbert Maryon
- Year: 1912
- Medium: Bronze sheet metal
- Location: 51°42′56″N 0°30′12″E

Listed Building – Grade II
- Official name: Duffield Memorial
- Designated: 25 July 2022
- Reference no.: 1481229

The Duffield Memorial is a gravesite monument located in the churchyard of the Church of St Mary in Great Baddow, Essex, England. Designed by Herbert Maryon and installed in 1912, it originally commemorated Marianne Duffield and William Ward Duffield, who died in 1910 and 1912, respectively. A second plaque was added to commemorate their son, William Bartleet Duffield, who died in 1918. In 2022, Historic England designated the work a Grade II listed building, noting it as an unusual example of both Art Nouveau metalwork and churchyard memorial.

The memorial is made of riveted sections of bronze sheet metal, forming kerbs and a vertical cross. The edging follows the rectangular perimeter of the grave plot, with short pillars at each corner. Within the plot sits the Celtic wheel cross, decorated in relief with leaflike motifs. A curved shaft connects it to the foot, which, like the four-sided base upon which it is mounted, has curved and splayed sides. The plaques commemorating the Duffields are riveted to the base; a medallion, now lost, was once riveted to the centre of the cross.

== Background ==
=== Duffield family ===
The Duffields were a prominent family in Chelmsford, having settled in Great Baddow by the time of Henry VIII in the early 16th century. William Ward Duffield was born on 25 November 1820, one of nine children to James Duffield, a farmer. (Note: Siblings of William Duffield included Walter Duffield, who moved to Australia and also went on to lead a prominent farming career, James Duffield, who became a large-scale farmer in Great Baddow, Sarah Duffield, and David Duffield.) William Duffield went on to become a successful solicitor, founding two firms: Duffield and Son, in Chelmsford, and Duffield, Bruty and Co., in London. As of 2023, the latter survives as Duffield Harrison LLP; the former, by then known as Duffield Stunt, merged into Backhouse Solicitors in 2015. (Note: The name Duffield Stunt continued in use as part of an affiliate business until 2017.) He also held many public roles, including clerk to the Chelmsford Board of Guardians, clerk to the Justices at Chelmsford, registrar of the Chelmsford County Court and Bankruptcy Court, and governor (and later chairman) of the King Edward VI School. His private positions included director and chairman of the Chelmsford and Braintree Gas Companies, the Chelmsford and Blackwater Navigation Company, and the Reliance Life Assurance Company, and chairman of the London Board of the Norwich Union after it acquired Reliance.

William Duffield married Marianne Bartleet on 10 March 1860. The couple had three surviving children: sons William Bartleet (1861–1918) and Arthur Stewart (1867–1930), and daughter Florence Marion. (Note: Another son, Frederick Albert Duffield, died in 1862 at the age of three months.) Marianne Duffield died on 22 June 1910, three months after the couple had celebrated their 50th wedding anniversary. She was buried in the churchyard of the Church of St Mary in Great Baddow, following a family tradition of several generations. Her husband died two years later, on 7 August 1912, and was buried in the same grave. William Bartleet Duffield died a bachelor six years later in the Alpine spa town of Aix-les-Bains, France, where he had been wintering for his health.

=== Herbert Maryon ===
At the time of William Ward Duffield's death, Herbert Maryon was 38 years old and a teacher of sculpture at the University of Reading in Reading, Berkshire. One of his colleagues was Walter Geoffrey Duffield, a professor of physics at Reading and the grandson of William Ward Duffield's brother Walter. (Note: The Australian Academy of Science has a 1915 letter from Maryon to Walter Duffield.) Maryon had studied at The Slade, Saint Martin's School of Art, and the Central School of Arts and Crafts, where his teachers included Alexander Fisher and William Lethaby. He subsequently led the Keswick School of Industrial Art from 1900 to 1904, where he designed numerous Arts and Crafts works, and taught metalwork at the Storey Institute. Maryon taught at Reading from 1907 to 1927, then at Armstrong College until 1939. He designed a number of other memorials while a teacher, including First World War monuments for East Knoyle, Mortimer, and the University of Reading. After the Second World War, Maryon went on a second career as a conservator at the British Museum; his work on the Sutton Hoo ship-burial led to his appointment as an Officer of the Order of the British Empire.

Like the Duffields, the Maryons were native to the area; a family pedigree by Herbert Maryon's brother John Ernest started by declaring that "[t]he Maryon family has been located for centuries in the centre and west of co. Essex, the east of co. Hertford, and the south of co. Cambridge, so that a radius of 20 miles would include nearly every place in which they have held property or resided before the year 1800." This included a branch of the family in Chelmsford. Samuel William Maryon, whose grandfather was likely Herbert Maryon's great-great-grandfather (or the brother thereof), served as the Inspector of Corn Returns for the Chelmsford Corn Exchange Company, of which William Ward Duffield was the Secretary.

== Description ==
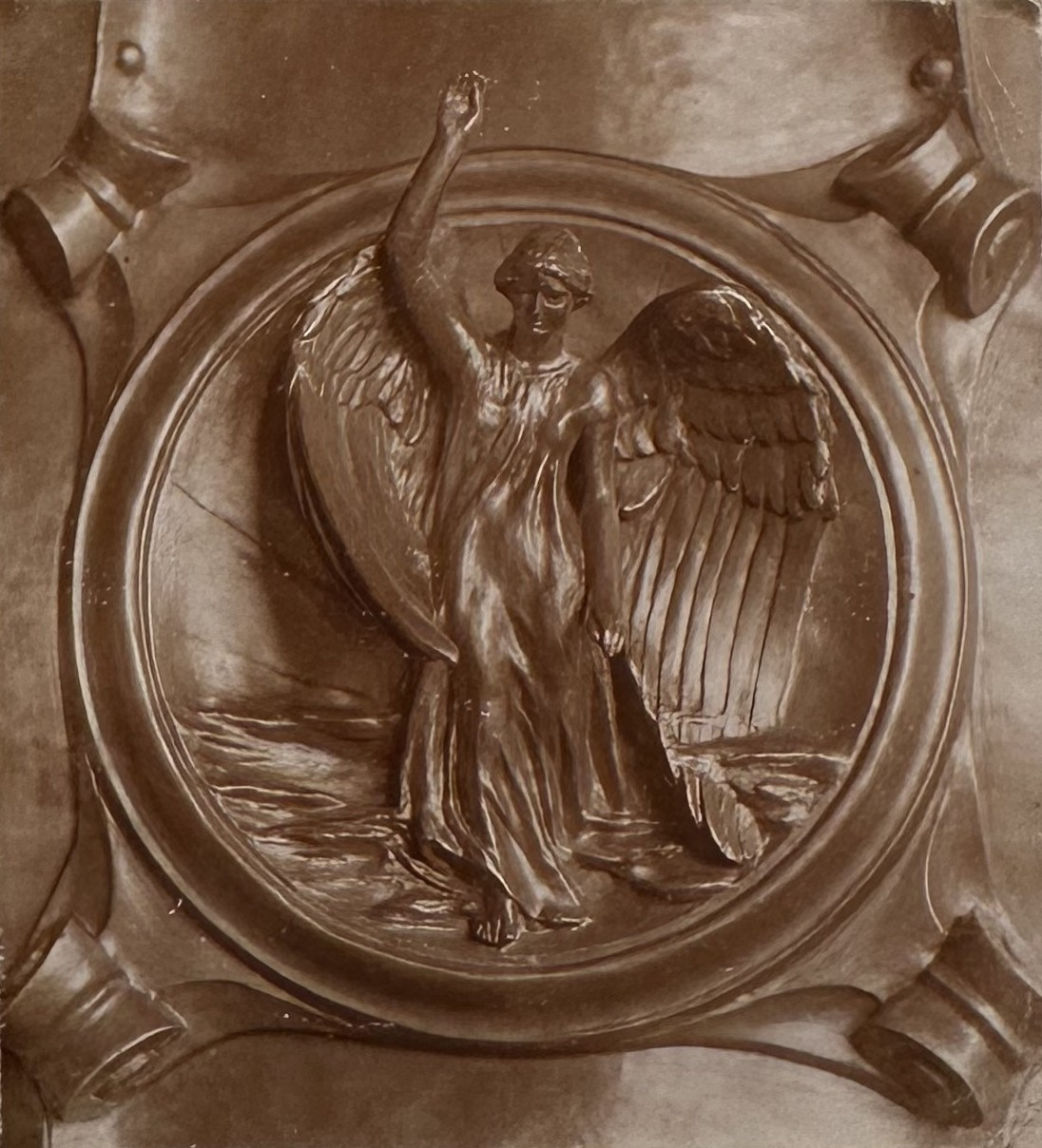
The central medallion (now lost)

The memorial is located approximately 75 metres (250 ft) east of the Church of St Mary. It is made of riveted sections of bronze sheet metal and designed in the Art Nouveau style. It consists of edging that follows the rectangular perimeter of the grave, and a vertical cross. Small pillars rise from each of the four corners. The memorial is placed over the grave of the Duffields, which is made of brick.

The Celtic wheel cross sits within the grave plot and surrounding edging, and is connected by a shaft to a four-sided base. The wheel is decorated in relief with leaflike motifs; a medallion, now removed, was once riveted to the centre. The shaft is curved, and meets the curved and splayed edges of the foot. This is mounted atop the base, which features similar lines.

Two copper plaques are riveted to opposite sides of the base. The west-facing one commemorates the elder Duffields, and reads:

IN LOVING MEMORY OF

MARIANNE DUFFIELD
BORN MAY 7TH 1827 DIED JUNE 22ND 1910
WILLIAM WARD DUFFIELD
BORN NOVEMBER 25TH 1820 DIED AUGUST 17TH 1912
'LUX PERPETUA LUCEAT EIS' (Note: Latin for Let perpetual light shine upon them—a common component of Christian prayer for the dead.)

The east-facing plaque reads:

ALSO IN LOVING MEMORY OF

WILLIAM BARTLEET DUFFIELD
BORN JANUARY 9TH 1861
DIED AT AIX LES BAINS FRANCE
JUNE 3RD 1918

== History ==
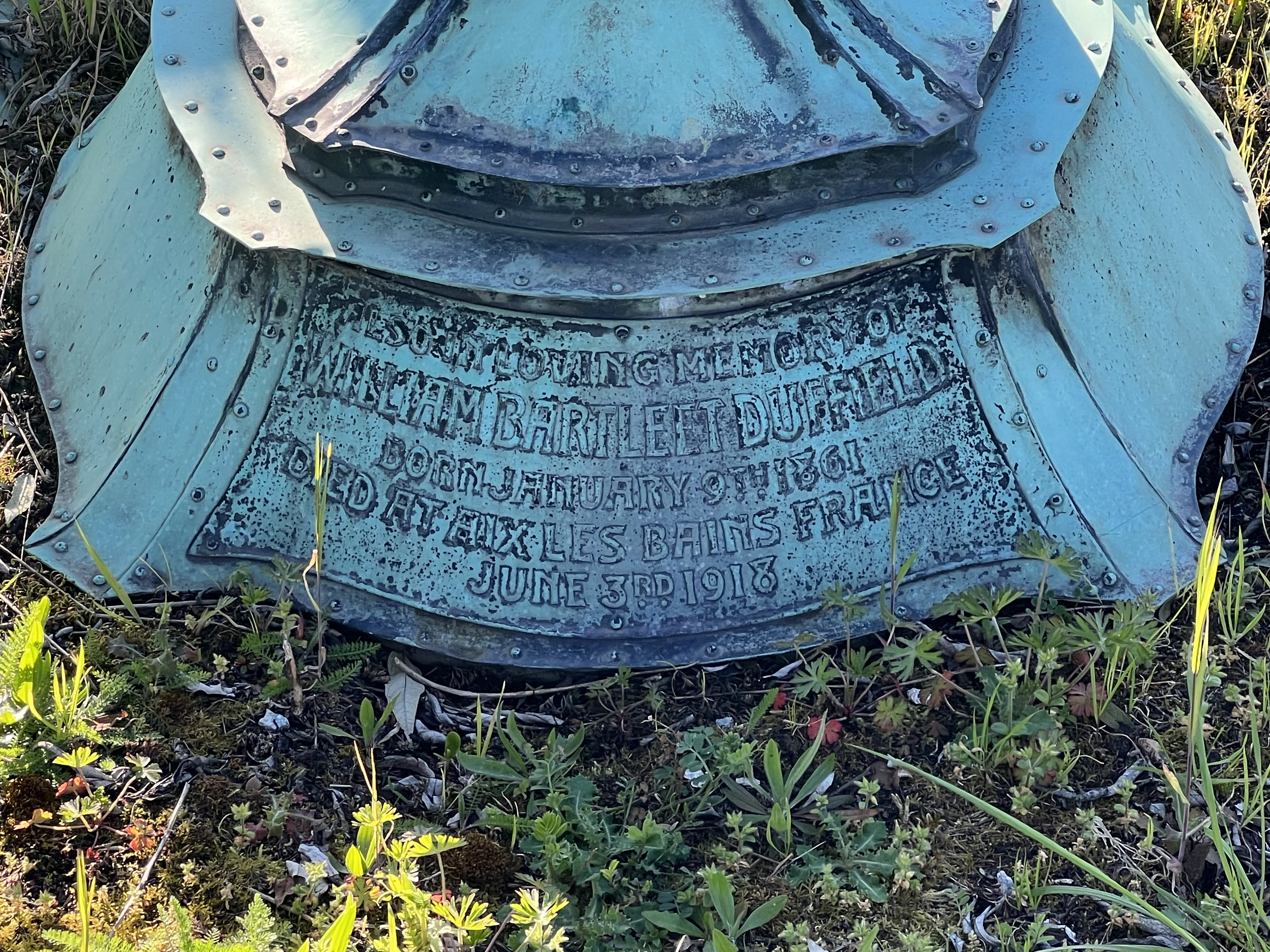
Plaque added to commemorate William Bartleet Duffield

The memorial was erected around October 1912, within two months of William Duffield's death. Newspapers reported on it on 25 and 26 October, praising it as "very fine" and "admirably executed", and noting that it was "quite unique, at any rate in this neighbourhood". After William Bartleet Duffield died on 3 June 1918, the east-facing plaque was added to the memorial to commemorate him. (Note: William Bartleet Duffield's will had left some of his estate to his niece Andrea Stillingfleet Duffield, along with £100 (equivalent to £4,913 in 2025) for "a memento".)

On 25 July 2022, Historic England designated the memorial a Grade II listed building, indicative of "special interest". The organisation cited historic and architectural interest, and group value, (Note: "[T]he contribution the building makes to the architectural or historic interest of any group of buildings of which it forms part".) for listing the memorial. As to historic interest, Historic England termed the work "an unusual example of churchyard memorial design that is also memorial to prominent local citizen William Ward Duffield and his son". Architecturally, the organisation cited the "unusual example of Art Nouveau design in metal work, well detailed and combined with a conventional form of churchyard memorial, a Celtic wheeled cross". For group value, Historic England considered the memorial in conjunction with the Church of St Mary, itself a Grade I listed building (indicative of "exceptional interest").

== Bibliography ==
- Bruce, Ian (2001). The Loving Eye and Skilful Hand: The Keswick School of Industrial Arts. Carlisle: Bookcase. OCLC 80891576.
- "Towns' Directory: Chelmsford". The Essex Almanac for 1868. 1868. pp. 71–78.
- Gould, James B. (2016). "Surveying the Present: Prayer for the Dead in the Contemporary Church". Understanding Prayer for the Dead: Its Foundation in History and Logic. Cambridge: The Lutterworth Press. pp. 40–59. doi:10.2307/j.ctv1131g8j.7. ISBN 978-0-7188-9500-6. JSTOR j.ctv1131g8j.7.
- Maryon, John Ernest (1895). Records and Pedigree of the Family of Maryon of Essex and Herts. London: Self-published.
- Seales, Ken (2007). "Brownings". Broomfield: The Churchyard Fence Lists, The People and the Buildings (PDF). Vol. 2. Broomfield, Essex: Broomfield Parish Council. pp. 163–177.
