= Murders of John and Lois McCullough =

2019 British murder case

- Lois and John McCullough
- Location: Great Baddow, Essex, England
- Date: June 17–18, 2019
- Target: John and Lois McCullough
- Attack type: Double parricide
- Deaths: 2
- Perpetrator: Virginia McCullough
- Verdict: Pleaded guilty
- Convictions: Murder (2 counts)

John and Lois McCullough were a retired British couple from Great Baddow, Essex, who were murdered by their youngest daughter, Virginia McCullough, at the family home in June 2019. McCullough killed her parents after running up large debts in their name, and inventing stories to explain how the money had been lost. She attempted to poison them both with prescription medication, which resulted in John's death, but did not give Lois a sufficient amount to kill her, so she battered and stabbed her to death. McCullough then constructed a makeshift tomb for her father made from breezeblocks and sleeping bags, while she stored her mother's body in a wardrobe, also wrapped in a sleeping bag. McCullough then lived in her parents' house alongside the bodies for the next four years until she was arrested by Essex Police in September 2023. After pleading guilty to two counts of murder at her pre-trial hearing at Chelmsford Crown Court on 4 July 2024, McCullough was sentenced to life imprisonment with a minimum term of 36 years at a hearing on 11 October.

== Background ==
John McCullough, a retired business studies lecturer who had worked at Anglia Ruskin University, was 70 at the time of his death, while his wife, Lois, was 71. Both were in poor health at the time of their deaths and relied on their daughter as a caregiver. John McCullough had hypertension, type II diabetes, hypercholesterolaemia and glaucoma and was described as possibly on the autism spectrum, while Lois McCullough had anxiety, agoraphobia and traits of obsessive–compulsive disorder. The couple had five daughters, of whom Virginia was the youngest.

In 2019, Virginia McCullough (born 20 October 1987) had been living rent free at her parents' property on Pump Hill, Great Baddow, and had told them she was studying to become an artist, claiming the career would be financially rewarding to the family. In reality, McCullough ran up large credit card debts in her parents' name, and told them they had lost money to scams. By the time of the murders, McCullough had built up almost £60,000 worth of debt, and had forged letters in order to cover her tracks. McCullough's sisters have described her as "socially awkward" and a "compulsive liar".

== Murders ==
McCullough began planning her parents' murder in March 2019, accumulating a large amount of prescription drugs, and in May 2019 bought a knife, along with implements to crush up the medication. On 17 June 2019, and having previously used her father as a "guinea pig", she prepared a cocktail of prescription drugs, which she then gave to her parents. John McCullough, whose medication was crushed into an alcoholic drink, received a dosage strong enough to kill him, but Lois McCullough, who did not drink alcohol, did not consume a fatal dose. After finding her father dead in bed the next morning, and fearing that her mother would find out what she had done, McCullough then killed Lois, bludgeoning and stabbing her to death while she lay in bed listening to the radio.

McCullough then went to her local GP practice to seek treatment for a cut on her hand, which she had sustained while killing her mother. She later drove into Chelmsford to purchase plastic gloves and sleeping bags using her father's credit card, then returned home, where she set about concealing their remains. She created a "makeshift mausoleum" consisting of breezeblocks and sleeping bags in her father's downstairs study, where his body was stored, then concealed her mother's body in an upstairs wardrobe, wrapping it in a sleeping bag.

On 19 June, McCullough posed as her mother in order to obtain a new credit card and PIN, then used the card to purchase clothes and jewellery. She went on to construct a series of elaborate stories to explain her parents' absence to relatives and doctors, including that they were on lengthy holidays, were unwell, or had retired and moved from the area. She also deceived relatives by sending birthday cards, gifts and text messages that kept up the pretence that they were still alive. She continued to live in the house alongside her parents' remains, while claiming their State Pensions, and gambling £21,193 of their money away through online betting sites, as well as selling assets from the property. It would later be disclosed that she had benefited to the sum of £149,697. Conveniently for McCullough, the deception was also helped by restrictions brought in as a response to the COVID-19 pandemic, which began in 2020.

== Arrest and trial ==
In September 2023, after their daughter had cancelled a number of medical appointments on their behalf, John and Lois McCullough's GP contacted the safeguarding team at Essex County Council to raise concerns about the couple's welfare. The GP's concern had also been aroused because John McCullough had failed to collect a regular prescription. The council subsequently contacted Essex Police to report the doctor's concerns, doing so on 13 September. Initially treating the case as a missing persons' investigation, officers then spoke to McCullough, who told them her parents were travelling and would be returning in October. However, officers became suspicious about their absence.

On 15 September, Essex Police executed a search warrant at the McCullough property, breaking into the house and arresting McCullough. McCullough then confessed to killing her parents, telling PC 77329 Brown of Essex Police , "I did know that this day would come eventually. I deserve to get what's coming, sentence-wise, because that's the right thing to do and then that might give me a bit of peace." She even quipped at one point to PC Brown "cheer up," adding "at least you caught the bad guy". McCullough told how she had beaten her mother to death, telling officers the act was "like someone badly playing the xylophone or something". She also told them the location of a knife she had used as a "murder weapon", as well as a hammer that she said "will still have blood on it".

McCullough was charged with two counts of murder, and appeared before magistrates on 18 September, where she was remanded in custody. On 19 September she appeared at Basildon Crown Court via videolink from Peterborough Prison, where judge Samantha Leigh set a plea hearing for 1 December. An inquest into the deaths was opened by Essex Coroner Michelle Brown on 10 October, and adjourned pending the outcome of the police investigation. However, the hearing was told that Lois McCullough had died from "stab wounds to the chest", while the cause of death for John McCullough, whose body was found by police on 16 September, was given as "pending further investigation".

On 1 December, McCullough appeared at Chelmsford Crown Court, again via videolink from prison, but did not enter a plea, with her defence arguing more time was needed to prepare reports from expert witnesses. Judge Christopher Morgan set 5 February 2024 as the date of the next hearing, with a deadline of 1 February for the defence to prepare its reports. She appeared in court again via videolink on 9 February, and was further remanded in custody pending a hearing on 1 March. At a hearing held on 1 March 2024, Morgan set a trial date for 7 October. At a hearing on 4 July, McCullough pleaded guilty to both counts of murder, and a sentencing hearing was scheduled to begin on 10 October.

== Sentencing ==
The sentencing hearing took place on 11 October. The hearing was presided over by Mr Justice Johnson, with Lisa Wilding KC acting for the prosecution, and Christine Agnew KC acting for the defence.

Wilding told the court that McCullough "was actively engaged in fraud and deception well before the killings" and that McCullough and her parents were all in debt. Following the murders "her attention switched to deceiving the outside world". The hearing was told that McCullough "continued to receive John's teacher's pension and spend it" and that "transcripts from calls even show her masquerading as her father. She used their credit cards and opened further accounts in their names." The court also heard that two days after the murders, McCullough placed an order with B&Q for 40 building blocks, cement, and sharp sand. A number of further items, including sellotape and a step ladder, were subsequently ordered.

Wilding described the structure containing John McCullough's remains as being "in a corner of the room" with its sides composed of "masonry blocks stacked together and secured with white filler, forming a rectangular tomb with the end closest to the internal door composed of panels of wood". The hearing was also told the structure was "covered with multiple blankets, and a number of pictures and paintings over the top". The body itself was wrapped in a sleeping bag and concealed with at least eleven layers of "plastic and other material". Wilding described the COVID-19 pandemic and the resulting limited medical contact as a "stroke of luck in pursuing the deception". Following her arrest, McCullough had alleged her parents were abusive, but the claims were rejected by her siblings, who described them as "lies and a disgusting misrepresentation of our family."

Agnew told the hearing that McCullough was her parents' primary caregiver, and that both had physical and mental health issues. She argued that McCullough's quick admission of guilt was a move to "prevent distress to John and Lois's family". The hearing was also told that McCullough had been diagnosed with paranoia and autism, with the sentencing remarks adding that she had developed symptoms of a personality disorder at the time of the murders. Agnew told the court that McCullough was "not using her autism as an excuse for what she did", but that it did "in some way, explain her actions".

Sentencing McCullough to life imprisonment, Johnson told her she had "robbed" her parents of "dignity in death. Your conduct amounted to a gross violation of the trust that should exist between parents and their children". He ordered that she must serve a minimum of 36 years in prison before being considered for parole. He took the decision not to impose a whole life tariff, considered as a sentence of last resort, telling McCullough, "Having regard to all the circumstances of the case, including your immediate admissions to the police and your guilty pleas when you were first arraigned, this is not one of those cases of the most exceptional seriousness where a whole life order, as a sentence of last resort, is required."

She will become eligible to be considered for parole on 3 October 2059. Johnson also ruled that her mental health conditions did not "substantially" reduce her culpability and that she had committed "murders done for gain" after prolonged "economic abuse" of her parents.

McCullough's sentence was subsequently referred to the Attorney General's Office under the Unduly Lenient Sentences scheme. However, in January 2025 and following a review of the sentence, the Attorney General's Office concluded it did not meet the threshold to be referred to the Court of Appeal.

== Reaction ==
Following the sentencing, Detective Superintendent Rob Kirby of Essex Police described McCullough as "an intelligent manipulator who chose to kill her parents callously, without a thought for them or those who continue to suffer as a result of their loss. The details of this case shock and horrify even the most experienced of murder detectives, let alone any right-thinking member of the public." Nicola Rice of the Crown Prosecution Service said the case was "truly disturbing" and had "left behind it a trail of devastation", adding "I can only hope that the sentence passed today will help those who loved and cared for Lois and John begin to heal."

A joint statement was issued by the victims' family: "Our family has been left devastated and heartbroken at the deaths of our parents who were taken from us so cruelly. As we try to move forward with our lives, we will remember the happy times we enjoyed with them. Our Mum and Dad are forever in our hearts, and are loved and missed beyond any measure."

== Documentaries ==
The case was the subject of the Channel 5 true crime documentary Killed By Our Daughter: The Virginia McCullough Murders, which aired on 12 November 2024. It was repeated on 17 November. The case is also the subject of the 2025 Paramount+ documentary Confessions of a Parent Killer.
