= John Fortescue (Devon lawyer) =

English lawyer and administrator

John Fortescue (died before 1436) was an English lawyer and administrator from a minor landowning family in Devon.

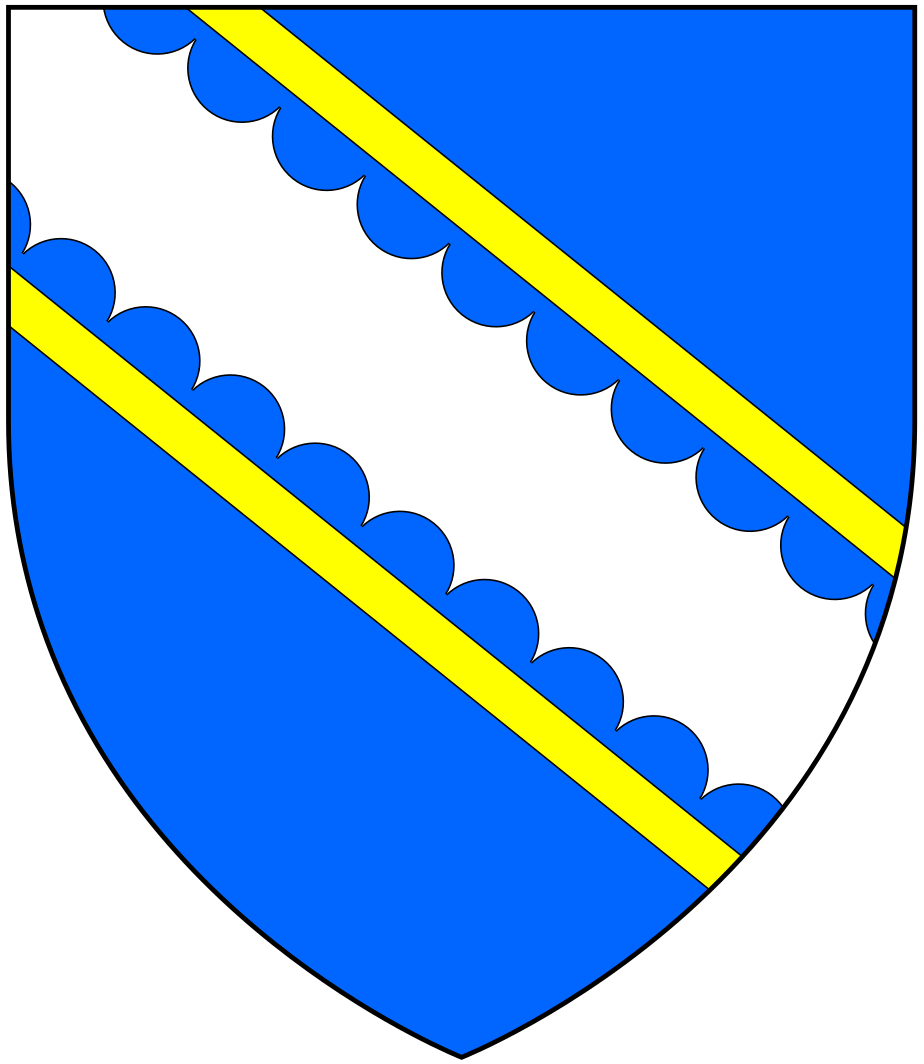
Arms of Fortescue: Azure, a bend engrailed argent cottised or motto: Forte Scutum Salus Ducum ("A Strong Shield is the Salvation of Leaders")

As his descendants rose in the world, they felt the need for a more illustrious ancestor and created a suitable hero: a knight who fought in France at the famous Battle of Agincourt in 1415, was put in command of the captured city after the Siege of Meaux in 1422, and married an heiress who was mother of his sons. These imaginary details were reproduced over the centuries, even reaching the authoritative “History of Parliament” in 1993.

In reality he lived and died as a gentleman, his only known trip abroad was a pilgrimage to Spain, and the mother of his sons was a first wife whose last name is unknown.

== Origins ==
Born about 1365, he was a younger son of William Fortescue, who held land at Whympston in the parish of Modbury, and his wife Elizabeth Beauchamp, who was the widow of Richard Branscombe and the daughter of John Beauchamp and his wife Margaret Whalesborough.

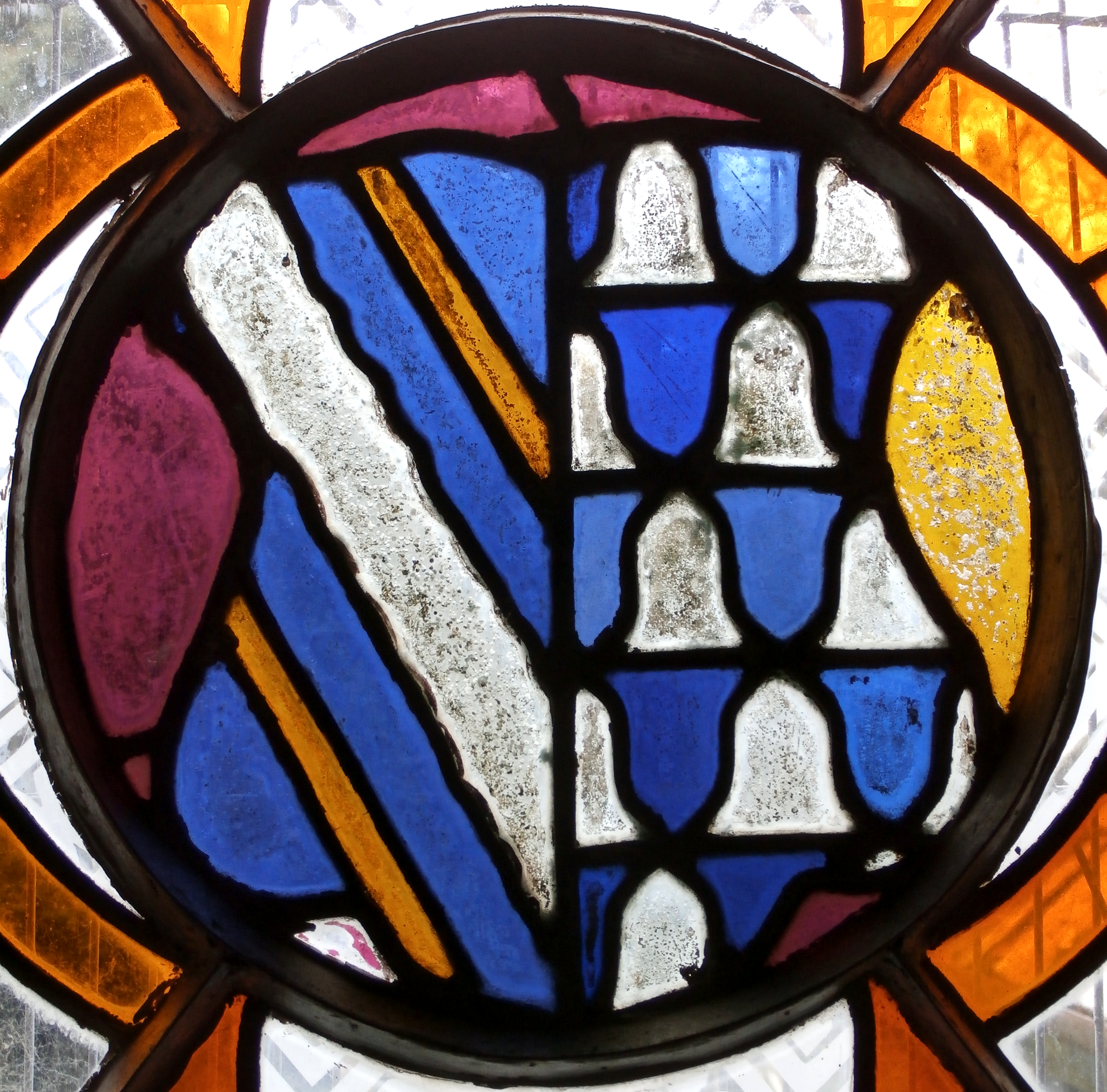
Stained glass in the church of Buckland Filleigh showing the arms of Fortescue impaling those of Beauchamp of Ryme, symbolising the marriage of the parents of John Fortescue

== Career ==
First appearing in the records in 1390 as a gentleman appointed to a commission enquiring into wastage in manors held by the king in Devon and elsewhere, documents in 1411 and 1412 show him carrying out a property transaction and sitting on a commission for oyer and terminer. In 1413, as steward of Edward Courtenay, Earl of Devon, he was involved in the election of the Members of Parliament for Devon. That year saw his one known journey overseas, when he obtained a safe conduct to sail on a ship commissioned at Plymouth by the earl's elder son Sir Edward Courtenay to convey pilgrims bound for Santiago de Compostela. In 1416 he served a term as escheator for the counties of Cornwall and Devon, but his main work was as an estate manager and minor legal functionary in Devon, for which before 1422 he had been admitted a member of Lincoln's Inn. In 1419, when the younger son Hugh Courtenay succeeded as earl, he was appointed as one of his stewards. He had died by 1436.

== Family ==
Before 1408 he was married to Clarice, whose family name is unknown, and they had three sons: Henry Fortescue, born about 1395 and died about 1460; John Fortescue, born about 1397 and died in 1479; and Richard Fortescue, born about 1400. By 1412 he and Clarice were living at Combe in the parish of Holbeton but by 1421 she was dead and he was married to Eleanor Norris, daughter of William Norris.

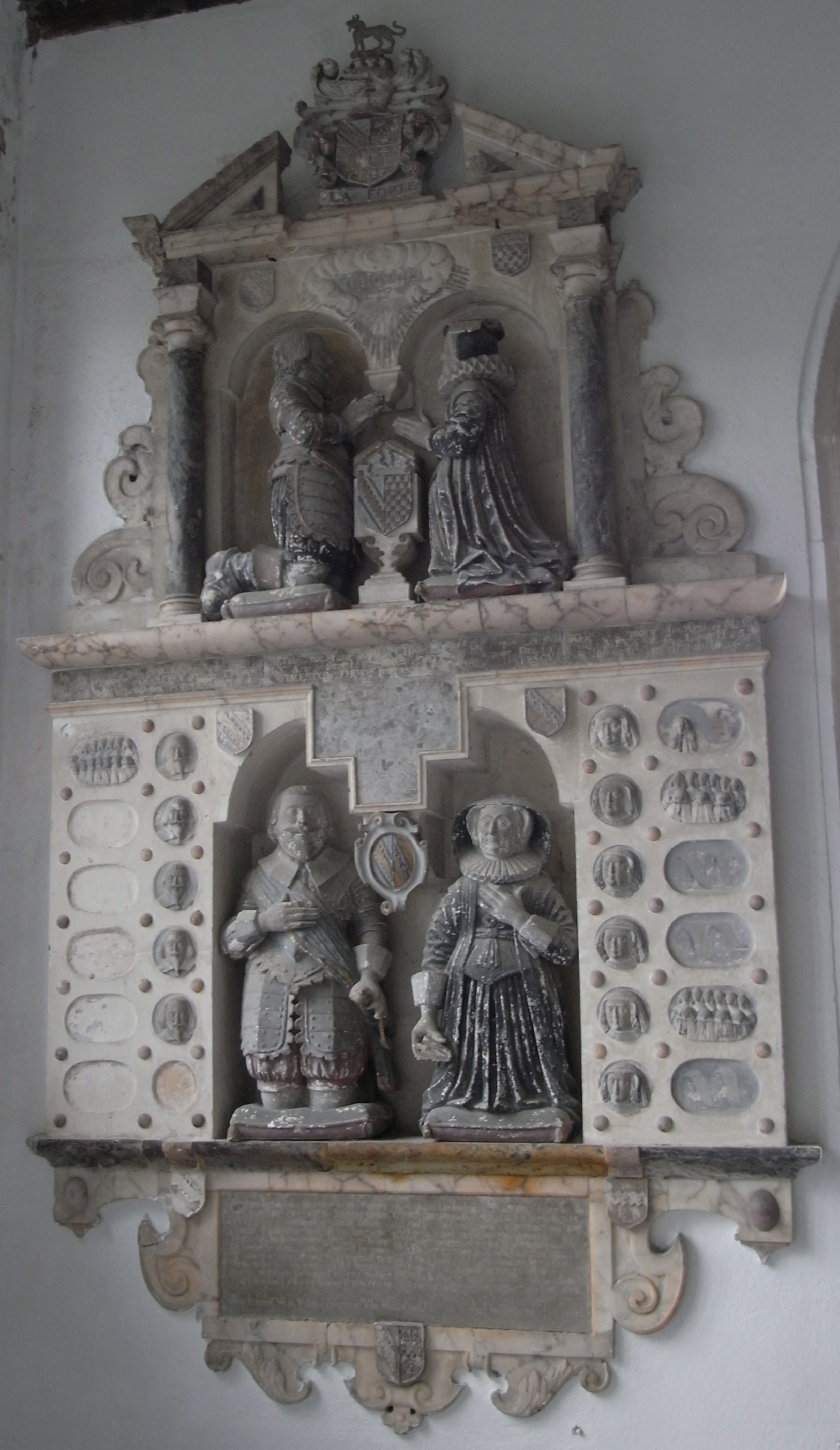
Mural monument in the church of Weare Giffard that claims he was a soldier and a knight
