= Manor of Buckland Filleigh =

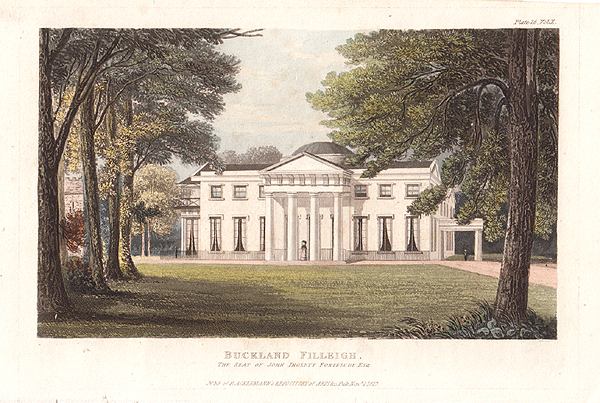
"Buckland Filleigh the seat of John Inglett Fortescue Esq." Engraving from 1828.

The manor of Buckland Filleigh was a manor in the parish of Buckland Filleigh in North Devon, England. Mentioned in the Domesday Book, the manor and its estates passed through several families, including over 300 years owned by the Fortescues.

== Early history ==
The manor of Bocheland was listed in the Domesday Book of 1086 as the 13th of the 99 holdings of Geoffrey de Montbray, Bishop of Coutances. His tenant was Drogo, who held several other manors from him. It had been held before 1066 by Wulfeva.

The manor became the inheritance of the de Filleigh family seated at Filleigh in North Devon. On default of male heirs, the manor passed by marriage to the Denzell (or Densyll etc.) family, which originated from Denzell manor in St Mawgan parish, Cornwall. It was a cadet branch of this family which had acquired the de Filleigh lands by marriage.

== Fortescue and Spooner ==
Arms of Fortescue

In 1454 Sir Martin Fortescue (died 1472), second son of Chief Justice Sir John Fortescue (1395–1485) married Elizabeth Densyll (died 1508), a daughter and co-heiress of Richard Densyll of Filleigh, and thereby the manor became a possession of the Fortescue family. The manor was then given to Martin Fortescue's second son, William Fortescue (died 1548).

The subsequent descent of the manor through this family was as follows:

- William Fortescue (died 1548), who married Matilda Atkyns, daughter and heiress of John Atkyns of Milton Abbot. He was predeceased by his eldest son and heir apparent John Fortescue (died 1520).
- William Fortescue (1503–1583) (grandson), son of John Fortescue (died 1520). He married Anne Giffard, a daughter of Sir Roger Giffard (died 1547) of Brightley, Chittlehampton.
- John Fortescue (died 1604) (son), buried in the church of Weare Giffard, which manor was a seat of his senior Fortescue cousins. He married Anne Porter, daughter of Walter Porter of Thetford in Norfolk.
- Roger Fortescue (died 1629) (son), married Mary Norleigh (died 1628), daughter of Richard Norleigh of Inwardleigh, Attorney-at-Law.
- John Fortescue (1597–1655) (son), married Thomasine Prideaux, daughter of Humphrey Prideaux of Soldon, Holsworthy.
- William Fortescue (1622–1680) (son), married Emlyn Trosse (died 1706), daughter of Henry Trosse.
- Henry Fortescue (1659–1691) (son), whose monument survives in Buckland Filleigh Church. He married Agnes Dennis, daughter of Edward Dennis of Barnstaple, North Devon.
- Sir William Fortescue (1687–1749), KC, PC (son) a British judge and Master of the Rolls 1741–1749. He was probably responsible for the landscaping, including the serpentine lake, at Buckland Filleigh. He married his cousin, Mary Fortescue (died 1710), daughter of Edmund Fortescue (1660–1734) of East Allington Mary died an early death on 1 August 1710 and her monument exists in St Andrew's Church, East Allington. They had a daughter and sole heiress:
- Mary Fortescue (1710–1752), (daughter) who also inherited the Fortescue estate of Fallapit from her mother. Her monument survives in St Mary's Church, Buckland Filleigh. She married John Spooner and produced an only daughter Mary Spooner (died 1747) who died an infant. Due to the absence of a Spooner male heir, the estate reverted to a Fortescue male cousin.
- John Fortescue (1700–1776) (second cousin) of Bampton. He was the grandson of Roger Fortescue (born 1666), younger brother of Henry Fortescue (died 1691) of Buckland Filleigh. He died unmarried.

== Inglett-Fortescue ==
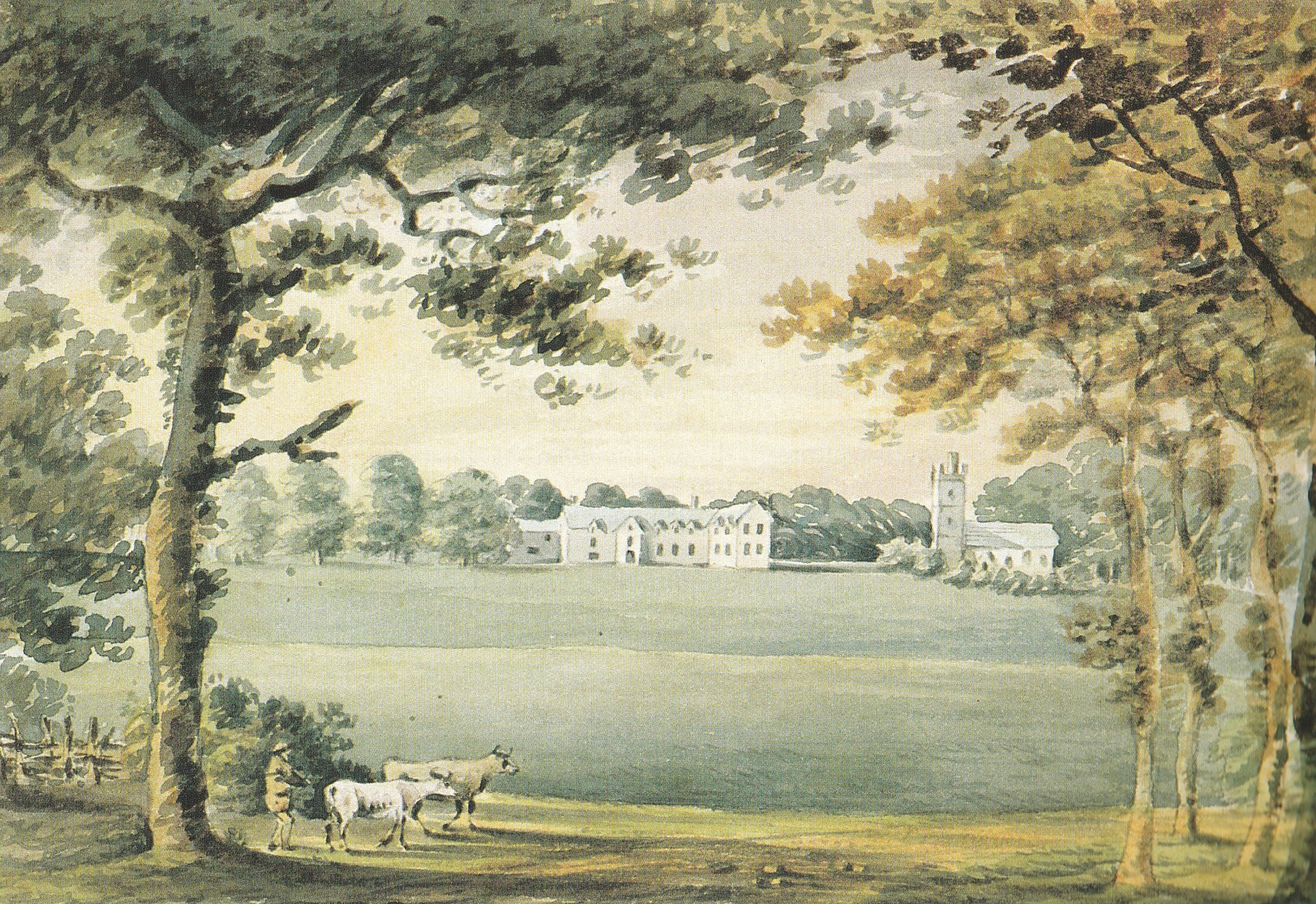
1797 watercolour of Buckland Filleigh House by Rev. John Swete. The house burned down the next year.

On inheriting his uncle's estates, including Buckland Filleigh, Richard Inglett "Fortescue" (1731–1790) assumed the surname Fortescue by royal licence in 1766. He was a collector of customs. He was the eldest son of Caleb Inglett (died 1752) of Dawlish by his wife Rebecca Fortescue (1699–1764) who was sister to John Fortescue (1700–1776). He married Elizabeth Weston, daughter of Lucy Weston.

Richard's only son was Lt. Col. John Inglett Fortescue (1758–1841) of the North Devon Yeomanry Cavalry, JP and DL for Devon. In 1792 he was appointed a trustee of the large Devon and Cornwall estates of the five-year-old Robert Trefusis, 18th Baron Clinton (1787–1832), of nearby Heanton Satchville, Petrockstowe, and in that connection served as MP for that family's pocket borough of Callington, Cornwall (1801–03). He was Receiver-General of the Land Tax for Devon from 1819 to 1841, a lucrative post. He rebuilt the mansion house in 1810 in the neo-classical style following a fire in 1798. By his first wife, Anne Saunders (died 1815), daughter of a merchant of Exeter, Thomas Saunders, he had children including his eldest son and heir, Rev. John Dicker Inglett-Fortescue (1785–1860) who sold the manor and died unmarried.

== Later history ==
In 1843 Rev. John Dicker Inglett-Fortescue sold Buckland Filleigh to Alexander Baring, 1st Baron Ashburton (1774–1848). In the 1870s it was acquired by William James Browne, MRCS (1815–1894) a medical doctor and owner of large agricultural stations in South Australia. He was born in Marlborough in Wiltshire, a son of Benjamin Browne (1779–1821). He moved to Australia in 1835 where he changed his career from medicine to livestock rearing and returned to England with his family in 1866. The manor passed to William Browne's fourth son, Major (Arthur) Scott Browne (1867–1946) who was educated at Eton College and the Royal Military Academy Sandhurst, and was a JP and DL for Devon. On 5 June 1894 he married Mary Frances Rolle, one of the two daughters of Hon. Mark Rolle (1835–1907) of nearby Stevenstone, Devon. Major Browne's nephew, Captain Percy Browne inherited, but he sold the estate in 27 lots shortly after his newly wedded wife was killed in a fox-hunting accident in 1952.

The mansion became Buckland House School, whick was bought by Richard Archer Wallington in approximately 1952 from a MR Maxwell and built it from some 28 pupils to 60 and attained an excellent reputation and included girls for the first time. Mr Wallington sold the school in 1963 after suffering a coronary to Max Williams, then headmaster of Upcott House Preparatory School, Okehampton. In January 1964 the former Upcott House pupils and teaching staff were moved to the now-expanded Buckland House. In 1984 Williams closed the school and sold the house and much-reduced estate to Mr Synyard who lived there for six years until 1990. The estate was then bought by an adventure holiday company which became bankrupt following its involvement in the Lyme Bay boating disaster in Dorset in 1996. As of 2014 the house and its estate of 280 acres was owned by Ralph and Suzanne Nicholson, who reconverted the house back into a residence with 17 bedrooms and 9 bathrooms, which they let-out for commercial and private functions and parties.

== Sources ==
- Cherry, Bridget & Pevsner, Nikolaus, The Buildings of England: Devon. Yale University Press, 2004. ISBN 978-0-300-09596-8
- Vivian, Lt.Col. J.L., (Ed.) The Visitations of the County of Devon: Comprising the Heralds' Visitations of 1531, 1564 & 1620. Exeter, 1895.
