= Great Baddow =

Village and civil parish in Essex, England

Coordinates: 51°42′57″N 0°30′5″E

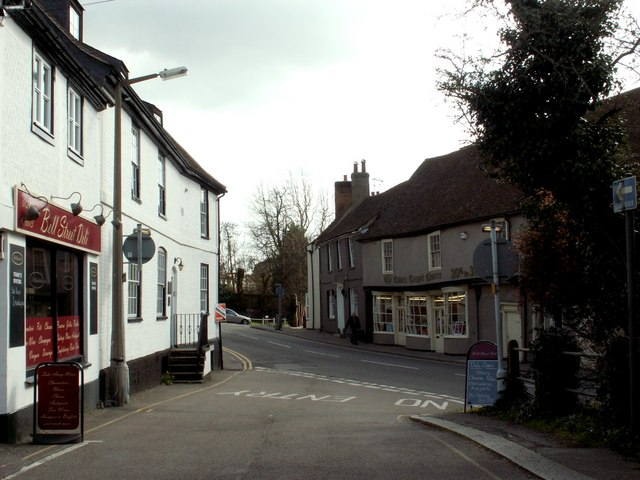
- Bell Street, Great Baddow

- Location within Essex
- Population: 14,951 (Parish, 2021)
- OS grid reference: TL731052
- Civil parish: Great Baddow
- District: Chelmsford
- Shire county: Essex
- Region: East
- Country: England
- Sovereign state: United Kingdom
- Post town: CHELMSFORD
- Postcode district: CM2
- Dialling code: 01245
- Police: Essex
- Fire: Essex
- Ambulance: East of England
- UK Parliament: Maldon

Great Baddow is a suburban village and civil parish in the City of Chelmsford district of Essex, England. It now forms part of the built up area of Chelmsford as defined by the Office for National Statistics, lying 1.5 miles (2 km) to the south-east of the city centre. At the 2021 census the parish had a population of 14,951.

== History ==
Great Baddow's name is believed to have been derived from the River Beadwan, now known as the River Chelmer, which marks the northern boundary of the village. Beadwan is thought to be a Celtic word of uncertain meaning, possibly birch stream or a reference to the goddess Badb.

In the Saxon period, the manor of Great Baddow was held by the Earls of Mercia and in the 13th century by Robert de Brus, 5th Lord of Annandale whose widow launched a legal challenge over its ownership on his death in March 1295. After passing to the Crown, Henry VIII later granted it to Catherine of Aragon. During the reign of Edward VI, it was held by the Paschals, before being sold to J.A. Houblon in 1736.

According to information in the local Church of St Mary, the rebel leader Jack Straw led an ill-fated crowd (the men of Essex) from the churchyard to London, in one of the risings in the 1381 Peasants' Revolt.

In 1731, Jasper Jeffrey founded Great Baddow Free School and, in 1830, two National Schools were built. By 1933, there were 7 daily schools, 2 daily and Sunday schools, and a further 2 boarding schools.

Great Baddow is recorded as having had a population of 1,445 in 1801, a figure that had risen to 2,022 in 1841. White's Directory of Essex 1848 reports Great Baddow as being 'one of the handsomest villages in Essex' having 'many scattered farms and neat houses', also noting that it had an annual pleasure fair on 14 May.

William Calcraft, the hangman and a cobbler by trade, was born at Baddow in 1800.

Following the Poor Law Amendment Act 1834, responsibility for the poor of Great Baddow was removed from the parish and transferred to the Chelmsford Union on 10 August 1835.

The Post Office Directory of Essex 1851, which lists the principal residents and trade persons of the parish of Great Baddow, includes 24 farmers, 8 beer retailers, 4 shoemakers, 3 blacksmith, 2 dressmakers and notes that the vicar is residing in the Vineyards.

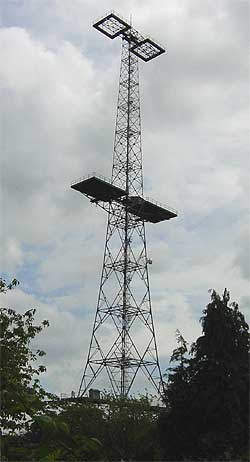
The former Chain Home radar transmitter tower, in the grounds of BAE Systems Applied Intelligence Laboratories, Great Baddow – a prominent local landmark

The Great Baddow Mast – a former Chain Home radar transmitter tower, originally sited at RAF Canewdon – was moved to the outskirts of Great Baddow at around 1954 and is used by BAE Systems for equipment testing. The last remaining example of a Chain Home tower maintaining its platforms, it was made a listed building by Historic England in October 2019 and given a Grade II status.

In October 2024 Virginia McCullough was sentenced, at Chelmsford Crown Court, to life imprisonment with a minimum term of 36 years. She had previously admitted to murdering her parents between 17 and 20 June 2019 at their home in Pump Hill in the village, and then concealing their bodies in the bedroom wardrobes, while continuing to live at the address for four years.

== Amenities ==
In 1967, a fire station was opened in Great Baddow to replace the former station which occupied a converted hut in Brewery Fields, Galleywood; it was once part of the Galleywood race course complex.

Great Baddow has three pubs: the White Horse, Blue Lion and The Star; The Beehive and King's Head pubs have closed in recent times. There is also a family-run brewery, the Chelmsford Brewing Company. The former Baddow Brewery, previously owned by the Baddow Brewery Co Ltd, built in 1868 and extended in 1878 by George Scamell, is now a Grade II building and houses local businesses. Great Baddow is also home to the Pontlands Park Country Hotel and the Baddow Antique Centre.

The centre of Great Baddow is now a conservation area and contains over 30 listed buildings.

=== Development ===
During the early part of the 20th century, Great Baddow grew through ribbon development towards Chelmsford and Galleywood. In 1936, Marconi's Wireless Telegraph Company opened the Marconi Research Laboratory in Great Baddow (now BAE Systems Applied Intelligence Laboratories), bringing together their various radio, television and telephony research teams in a single location. As the electronics industry developed, the campus expanded during the 1940s and 1950s to include research into radar, general physics, high voltage, vacuum physics and semiconductors. Great Baddow expanded considerably in the 1950s with the construction of Rothmans Estate, which provided housing for workers at Marconi's and English Electric Valve Company in Chelmsford. The village has continued to expand over subsequent years. The Office for National Statistics now classes Great Baddow as being part of the Chelmsford built up area.

The Vineyards, in the centre of the old village, was once a Georgian house set in wooded grounds which later became a hotel. It was demolished in the mid-1960s before the advent of conservation legislation, to make way for the construction of the Vineyards shopping centre and later the Marrable House office block, both constructed with a 'scale, form, layout and architecture' that Chelmsford Council now considers to 'jar with its historic surroundings'. Despite this, the shopping centre continues to thrive and, since refurbishment in the 2000s, the flats above are highly regarded and sought-after properties. Marrable House, a six-storey office block was described at the time of its construction in 1968 as "one of the worst examples of town and country planning in the country" and subsequently once voted as one of England's ugliest buildings, was demolished in the Spring of 2016, and was replaced with a 53-flat development, made up of one to two bedrooms in two buildings, named Heron Gate; the development was completed in spring 2018. A corner of the grounds of the former Vineyards mansion were retained and form a green area to the west of the Vineyards development. A library was also opened on the western edge of the development in September 1981, replacing the former building in Bell Street.

== Geology ==
Great Baddow lies to the south east to central Chelmsford, on higher ground that is thought to mark the edge of the main ice mass during the Anglian glaciation. An outcrop of glacial sand and gravel 3 km long and 0.8 km wide is beneath the village, which used to be extracted from several pits in the area, including Beehive Pit (now beneath Harbeard Tye), Baddow Hall Pit (now beneath Baden-Powell Close), to the south of the A1114 Princes Road (now in the grounds of Moulsham High School) and on what is now an area of open land off Waterson Vale. Smaller pits were also located off the Galleywood Road (near what is now Hollywood Close) and off Pitt Chase. The area is overlain with head, while the lower levels of the sand and gravel are mixed with London Clay. A Sarsen stone from the Beehive Pit used to stand outside The Beehive pub.

== Education ==
The village secondary school is Great Baddow High School, a sports and science college on Duffield Road. Primary schools include Baddow Hall Infant and Junior Schools at the border of Great Baddow, Beehive Lane County Primary School, Larkrise Primary School, (formerly Rothmans Primary School), and Meadgate County Primary Schools.

== Nearby villages ==
- Galleywood
- Sandon
- Danbury
- Little Baddow
- Rettendon
- Moulsham
- Chelmer Village
