= John Inglett-Fortescue =

English politician

John Inglett-Fortescue (23 October 1758 – 25 November 1840) was a British politician and the Member of Parliament for Callington from 1801 to 1803.

== See also ==
- List of MPs in the first United Kingdom Parliament
