= White's Directories =

White's Directories were a series of directory publications issued by William White of Sheffield, England, beginning in the 1820s. White began his career in publishing by working for Edward Baines. (Note: By the 1850s Sheffield had two professional directory publishers: William White (34 Collegiate Crescent, Broomhall Park) and Francis White (Broomhall Terrace, 104 Ecclesall New Road))
