= William White (publisher) =

William White (3 January 1799 – 3 September 1868) of Sheffield was a British publisher of White's Directories. He began his career in publishing at the age of 18 when he joined Edward Baines of Leeds in the preparation of county histories and directories. Within four years he had succeeded Mr Baines and proceeded to publish directories of numerous counties of England until 1864 when he was succeeded by his son, also William White (1832–1870).
