= Buckland Filleigh =

Village and civil parish in Devon, England

Coordinates: 50°51′43″N 4°11′10″W

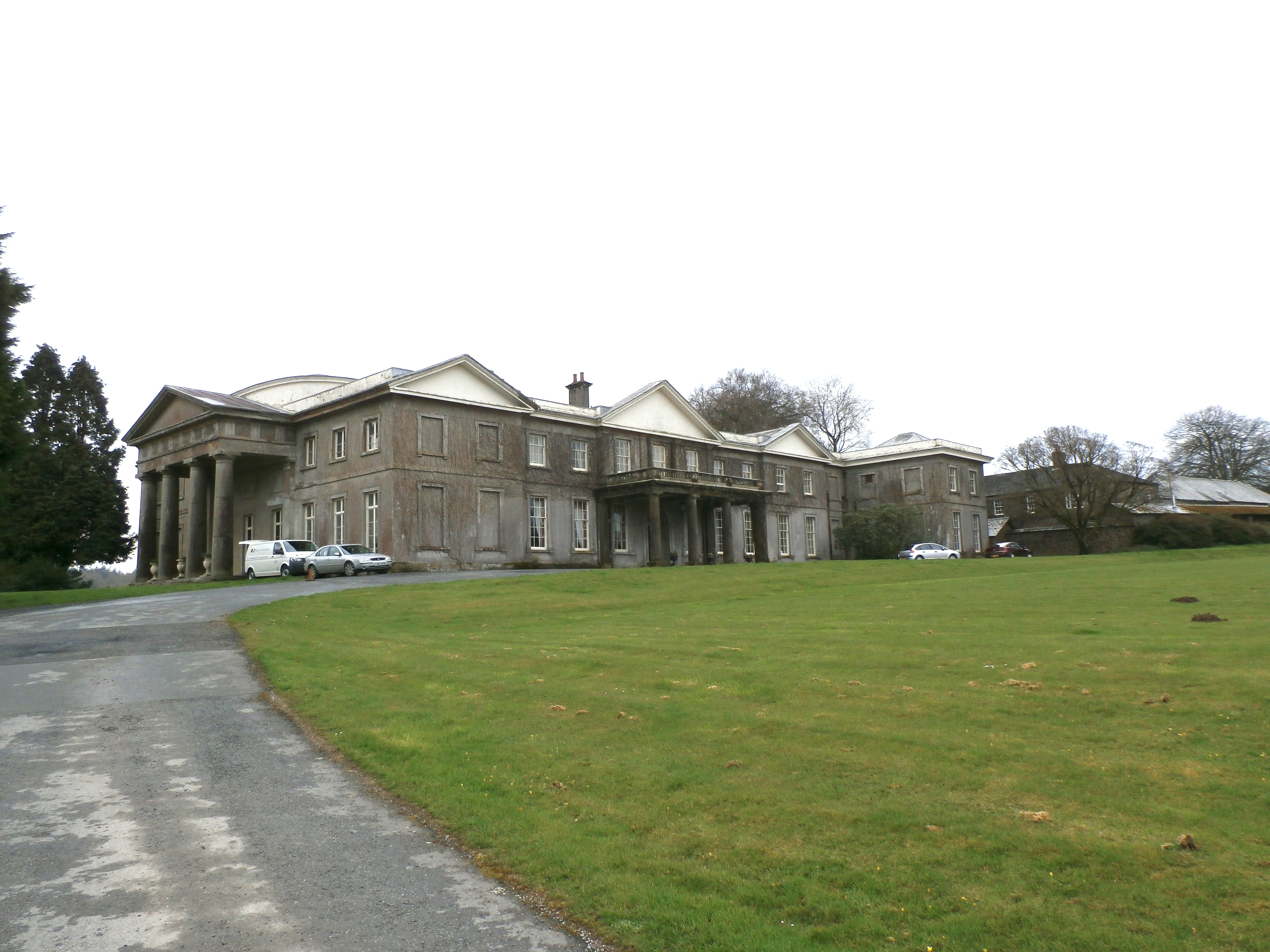
Buckland Filleigh House, viewed from north-east. As rebuilt circa 1810 by John Inglett Fortescue (1758–1841). St Mary's Parish Church is to the immediate east (left)

Buckland Filleigh is a village, civil parish and former manor in the Torridge district of North Devon, England, situated about 8 miles south of the town of Great Torrington. According to the 2001 census, the parish had a population of 170. It is surrounded clockwise from the north by the parishes of Peters Marland, Petrockstowe, Highampton, Sheepwash and Shebbear.

Within the parish is the manor house known as Buckland House, damaged by fire in 1798 and rebuilt in 1810 in the neo-classical style by John Inglett Fortescue (1758–1841) to the designs of the architect James Green.

== History ==
The manor of Buckland Filleigh is listed in the Domesday Book and was later held successively by the families of de Filleigh, Denzell, Fortescue, Spooner, Fortescue (again), Inglett-Fortescue, Baring and Browne.
