= Works of Herbert Maryon =

Physical creations of Herbert Maryon

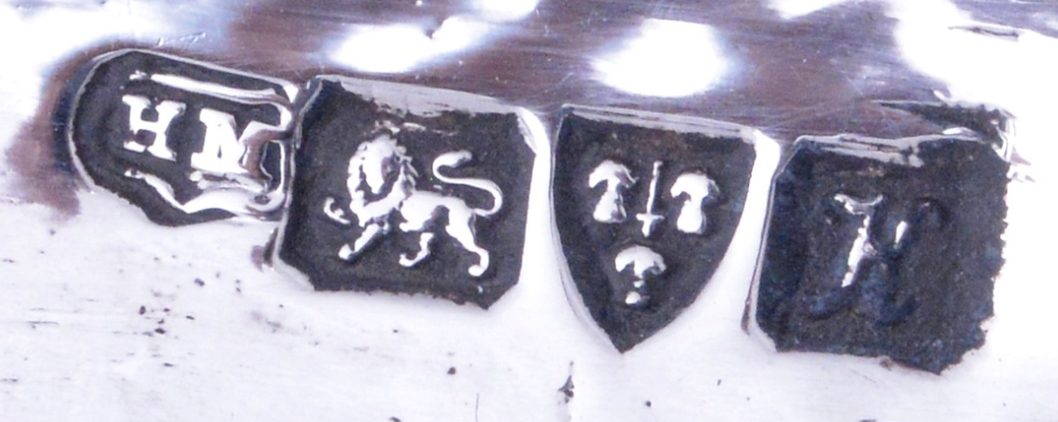
Maryon's HM hallmark from his 1910–11 silver inkwell, along with those for the lion passant to indicate purity, the Chester assay office, and the date (K)

The works of Herbert Maryon (1874–1965) were made in a variety of mediums. They were intended to be decorative, functional, or commemorative, and were primarily made during the first four decades of the twentieth century, a span that marked the first half of Maryon's career. In addition to being a sculptor and a goldsmith, Maryon was also an archaeologist, conservator, author, and authority on ancient metalwork—he saw his career as an artist carry him through the Second World War; a second career as a conservator at the British Museum brought him note for his work on the finds from the Sutton Hoo ship-burial.

Maryon designed, executed, and exhibited works while an art student, and as an art teacher. In 1899, while still in school—an education that included studies at the Polytechnic (probably Regent Street), The Slade, Saint Martin's School of Art, and the Central School of Arts and Crafts—Maryon used the Arts and Crafts Exhibition Society's event at the New Gallery to exhibit some of his earliest works: a shield of arms with silver cloisonné, and a silver cup that was designed by William Lethaby, who taught Maryon at the Central School. The following year Maryon became the first director of the Arts and Crafts-inspired Keswick School of Industrial Art, and until his departure in 1904 his work primarily consisted of designs and executions for the school. Maryon's pieces for the school ranged from individual commissions to utilitarian tableware; particularly with more functional designs, multiple examples were sometimes executed.

Maryon's career became more academic following his departure from Keswick. During his time teaching sculpture and other forms of art, however—from 1907 until 1927 at the University of Reading, and from 1927 until 1939 at Durham University's Armstrong College—he continued taking commissions. These included the designs for Statue of Industry, memorial plaques, and at least three war memorials, including the University of Reading War Memorial, where Maryon worked.

== Works ==
The following is a substantially incomplete list of the works of Herbert Maryon.

Image	Title/Description	Date	Dimensions	Location	Comments
	Metal casket	1898			Displayed at the Camden School of Art, where it won a prize for works in wrought metal, and where Maryon won a £60 (equivalent to £8,300 in 2024) Extension Scholarship. Maryon's sister Edith Maryon also won a prize, for a modelled head from life, as well as a scholarship.
	Shield of arms with silver cloisonné	1899			Displayed at the New Gallery for the 1899 Arts and Crafts Exhibition Society exhibition.
	Silver cup	1899			Designed by William Lethaby, Maryon's teacher at the Central School of Arts and Crafts. Displayed at the New Gallery for the 1899 Arts and Crafts Exhibition Society exhibition.
	Knocker	1900			Executed by Jeremiah Richardson. Displayed in the Royal Albert Hall for the Home Arts and Industries Exhibition, and reviewed in The Studio as "singularly good".
Colour photograph of Herbert Maryon's sculpture Winged Victory	Winged Victory	c. 1900		Private collection	Similar to works by Maryon's teacher Alexander Fisher.
Black and white photograph of a copper casket	Copper casket	1900	36.5 × 21.5 × 10 cm		Designed by Maryon; executed by Thomas Spark; ornamented by Thomas Clark and Maryon. Displayed in the Royal Albert Hall for the Home Arts and Industries Exhibition, and reviewed in The Studio as "singularly good". Auctioned in 2005 by Penrith Farmers’ & Kidd's, with an estimate of £800 to £1,200.
Colour photograph of a circular copper box with lid, depicting a tree in enamel, propped against the body	Enamelled copper box		3.5 in diameter	Private collection	Sold on eBay twice, in 2008, and in 2017.
	Bryony	c. 1900–04			Tray centre, said by a historian of the Keswick School to be "suggestive of tangled growth," and to be influenced by the wallpapers of William Morris. Pictured on page 69 of Ian Bruce's The Loving Eye and Skilful Hand.
Black and white photograph of a loving cup	Loving cup	1901			Exhibited at the 1901 Home Arts and Industries Exhibition.
Colour photograph of a bronze memorial tablet on an oak backing	Memorial to Bernard Gilpin	1901	3 5/12 × 2 ft	St Cuthbert's Church, Kentmere, Cumbria	Bronze on oak. Commissioned for £15, executed by Thomas Clark. Per Nikolaus Pevsner, "Arts and Crafts, almost Art Nouveau".
	Memorial to Thomas Allison Scott	1902		St Oswald's Church, Filey, North Yorkshire	Commemorates Private Thomas Allison Scott, who died of enteric fever in Winburg, South Africa, during the Second Boer War. Unveiled during St. Oswald's day celebrations on 5 August 1902. Another memorial to Scott, and family members, at St Wilfrid's Church in South Kilvington.
	Memorial tablet	1902		Westminster Abbey	Dedicates stained-glass windows in memory of Hugh Grosvenor, 1st Duke of Westminster.
Black and white photograph of a hot water jug	Silver hot water jug	1902	17 cm high	Private collection	Executed by Robert Temple. Exhibited at the 1902 Home Arts and Industries Exhibition. Possibly the same jug pictured on page 71 of Ian Bruce's The Loving Eye and Skilful Hand.
	Copper hot water jug	c. 1902	6 in high; 3.5 cm wide	Private collection	Same design as above silver jug. Executed by Robert Temple. As of 2024, for sale by Hammer and Hand for £175.
	Hot water jug	c. 1902	20 cm high	Private collection	Executed by Thomas Clark.
	Copper tea pot	c. 1902	12 cm high	Private collection	
Black and white photograph of a silver cup	Silver cup	c. 1902			Executed by Robert Temple.
Black and white photograph of a morse	Morse in silver and enamel	c. 1902			Executed by Thomas Clark.
Black and white photograph of six pieces of copper and pewter work	Copper and pewter work	c. 1902			Executed by Jeremiah Richardson, Thomas Clark, and Robert Temple. The casket is likely the 1900 design above.
Black and white photograph of six pieces of copper and pewter work	Copper tea caddy	c. 1902	4.5 in high	Private collection	Back left in photograph. Executed by Jeremiah Richardson, Thomas Clark, or Robert Temple. One version executed by Thomas Clark sold c. 2017–2024.
Black and white photograph of six pieces of copper and pewter work	Copper vase	c. 1902	19.5 cm high	Private collection	Back right in photograph. One version auctioned in 2017 for £70.
	Silver cream jug and sugar bowl	1902–03	6 cm high	Private collection	Executed by Robert Temple.
A gold-coloured metal cross with Celtic-inspired interlace pattern on arms, shaft, and head, and a central boss of red enamel surrounded by seven crystals	Hexham Abbey high-altar cross	1902		Hexham Abbey, Hexham, Northumberland	Designed by Maryon; executed by Jeremiah Richardson. Commissioned for Hexham Abbey in Hexham, and displayed at the 1902 Home Arts and Industries Exhibition. Awarded two blue stars at the Exhibition, signifying excellence in execution.
Black and white photograph of a casket	Oxidised silver casket	1902			Presented to Princess Louise upon her 1902 visit to the Keswick School. Designed by Maryon; executed by Jeremiah Richardson, Robert Temple, and Thomas Clark; enamelled by Maryon's sister Mildred Maryon.
	Copper hot water jug	1903	18.5 cm high; 10 cm diameter (base)	Manchester School of Art Arts and Crafts Museum	Possibly executed by Thomas Clark, whose last name is inscribed on the base. Exhibited at the 1903 Home Arts and Industries Exhibition, and purchased by the Manchester School of Art for its Arts and Crafts Museum. Exhibited from 22 October 1994 to 26 March 1995 as part of Inspired by Design: The Arts and Crafts Collection of The Manchester Metropolitan University.
Silver water jug designed by Herbert Maryon	Silver hot water jug	1903			Designed by Maryon and executed by the Keswick School. Pictured in The Art Workers' Quarterly in January 1903.
Black and white photograph of the head of a processional cross	Processional cross	1903			Gilding metal and enamel. Designed by Maryon and executed by the Keswick School. Pictured in The Art Workers' Quarterly in January 1903.
	Fire-Irons and Stand	1904			Designed by Maryon; executed by Matthew Armstrong. Displayed at the Leeds City Art Gallery for the 1904 Arts and Crafts Exhibition Society exhibition, where it was priced at £10 10s.
Black and white photograph of a loving cup mounted on a pedestal	The Luck of Cumberland	c. 1904	1.5 × 1 ft (without plinth)		Silver loving cup, made of 200 ounces of silver. Base decorated with a scale pattern to evoke the sea, and "The Luck of Cumberland" inscribed around the rim over a faintly traced border of rose leaves. Conical-shaped lid beaten from a single piece of silver and surrounded by a wreath of oak leaves in high relief, above which stands a winged figure of victory, standing on a globe supported by dolphins. Commissioned by the Cumberland County Council for presentation to HMS Cumberland. Presented by Albert Grey, 4th Earl Grey in August 1905. Described by The Newcastle Weekly Chronicle as "the most ambitious piece of work yet produced by the school", and Maryon's "last in connection with the school which he is now leaving".
	Loving cup	1904			Gilded metal and enamel. Exhibited at the Thirty-fourth Autumn Exhibition at the Walker Art Gallery from 12 September 1904 to 7 January 1905, priced at £5 (equivalent to £700 in 2024).
Black and white photograph of a processional cross	Processional cross	c. 1904			Executed by members of the Keswick School. Featured in The Studio in December 1905.
Black and white photograph of a silver challenge shield	Silver challenge shield	c. 1904			Reads in part "challenge shield for elementary day schools of Outwood, Whitefield, Prestwich & Unsworth." Executed by members of the Keswick School. Featured in The Studio in December 1905.
	Challenge shield	1904			Silver and enamel. Exhibited at the Thirty-fourth Autumn Exhibition at the Walker Art Gallery from 12 September 1904 to 7 January 1905, priced at £9 9s (equivalent to £1,300 in 2024). Possibly related to the challenge shield above.
Colour photograph of a memorial tablet	Memorial to 3rd (Militia) Batallian Durham Light Infantry	1904		St Mary’s Church, Barnard Castle	Memorial tablet. Unveiled on 27 July 1904 by Charles Surtees, and dedicated by Handley Moule, the Bishop of Durham. Designed by Maryon, and executed by Richardson, Armstrong, A. Vickers, and Temple.
	Victory	1906			Bronze Statuette. Displayed at the Leeds City Art Gallery for the 1906 spring exhibition, priced at £7 7s. and in July 1907 at the Coniston Institute as pert of an annual exhibition of arts crafts of the Lake District. Both exhibitions also included other works by Maryon.
	The Mermaid	1906			Silver and pearl ring. Displayed at the Leeds City Art Gallery for the 1906 spring exhibition, priced at £5 5s. Also displayed in July 1907 at the Coniston Institute as pert of an annual exhibition of arts crafts of the Lake District.
	Silver chalice	1906			Displayed at the Grafton Galleries for the Arts and Crafts Exhibition Society exhibition from 15 January to 17 March 1906, priced at £5 5s. A "Sicilian Lace Tablecloth" was listed as being displayed by "Mrs. Herbert J. Maryon." Also displayed in July 1907 at the Coniston Institute as pert of an annual exhibition of arts crafts of the Lake District.
	Silver chalice and paten	1906			Includes a repoussé vine design. Exhibited at the Thirty-sixth Autumn Exhibition at the Walker Art Gallery from 17 September 1906 to 5 January 1907, priced at £7 7s (equivalent to £1,000 in 2024). Reviewed by The Studio as "An example of good craftsmanship". Possibly related to the silver chalice above, and possibly the chalice and paten displayed at the Arts and Crafts exhibition at the Coniston Institute in Coniston, Cumbria, in 1908.
	Silver cup: "St. George"	1906			Displayed at the Grafton Galleries for the 1906 Arts and Crafts Exhibition Society exhibition, priced at £12 12s. A "Sicilian Lace Tablecloth" was listed as being displayed by "Mrs. Herbert J. Maryon."
	Pewter tray	1906			Executed by Matthew Armstrong. Displayed with three other items from the Keswick School at the 1906–07 New Zealand International Exhibition in Christchurch.
	Silver and pearl pendant	1906			Exhibited at the Thirty-sixth Autumn Exhibition at the Walker Art Gallery from 17 September 1906 to 5 January 1907, priced at 17s 6p (equivalent to £100 in 2024).
	Chalice and paten	c. 1908			Displayed at the Arts and Crafts exhibition at the Coniston Institute in Coniston, Cumbria, in 1908. Possibly related to the silver chalice and paten above.
	Enamelled silver necklace	c. 1908			With plique-à-jour enamels. Displayed at the Arts and Crafts exhibition at the Coniston Institute in Coniston, Cumbria, in 1908.
	Silver grange cup	c. 1908			Created for the Westmorland Musical Festival. Displayed at the Arts and Crafts exhibition at the Coniston Institute in Coniston, Cumbria, in 1908. Awarded in 1908 to the choir William. Granger for the most marks in three classes. Still awarded as of 2017, when it was presented to eight-year-old Jennifer Steele in the "songs from a Disney production" class.
Black and white photograph of a bowl	Child's bowl with signs of the zodiac in repoussé	1908			Silver with gold filigree panels representing the zodiac. Pictured in '"The Studio" Year Book of Decorative Art in 1909. Displayed at the Arts and Crafts exhibition at the Coniston Institute in Coniston, Cumbria, in 1908. Displayed at the Grafton Galleries for the 1910 Arts and Crafts Exhibition Society exhibition.
	Memorial to Henry Ayrton Chaplin	c. 1908		St Michael's church, Woodham Walter, Essex	Memorial plaque to Henry Ayrton Chaplin. A copy displayed by Maryon in 1908 at an exhibition hosted by the Art Students' Club at University College, Reading.
	Dawn	1910			Displayed at a 1910 exhibition of the Arts and Crafts Society in Carlisle, and at the Fortieth Autumn Exhibition at the Walker Art Gallery in 1910, priced at £21.
Colour photograph of a silver inkwell	Silver inkwell	1910–11	22 cm long; 14.5 cm wide; 6 cm high	Private collection	Bears hallmarks for Maryon (HM), lion passant, Chester assay office, and year (K). Auctioned by Woolley & Wallis in April 2025 for £441, then sold by The Peartree Collection that June.
Colour photograph of the Duffield Memorial	Duffield Memorial	1912		Church of St Mary, Great Baddow, Essex	Bronze.
	Polonius	1912			Exhibited at the Reading Corporation Art Gallery in 1912. Described by The Reading Observer as "a fine piece of modelling . . . which shows vigorous handling".
	Painting	c. 1913			Exhibited at the Reading Museum and Art Gallery in 1913.
	Pan pipes	1914			Statuette. Exhibited at the Royal Academy of Arts in 1914.
Colour photograph of the East Knoyle War Memorial	East Knoyle War Memorial	1920		East Knoyle, Wiltshire	Unveiled on 26 September 1920.
Colour photograph of the Mortimer War Memorial	Mortimer War Memorial	1921		Mortimer Common, Berkshire	Unveiled on 9 October 1921.
Black and white photograph of the Chorlton Road Congregational Church war memorial	Chorlton Road Congregational Church war memorial	1923			Gilded bronze. Erected in Chorlton Road Congregational Church (later Chorlton Road United Reformed Church; demolished c. 2010–14) in Manchester. Displayed in The Builder in April 1923.
Colour photograph of the University of Reading War Memorial	University of Reading War Memorial	1924		University of Reading, Reading, Berkshire	Unveiled in June 1924.
	An Invocation to Isis	1925	49.4 cm high; 12.3 cm wide (plinth)	Laing Art Gallery	Exhibited at Laing Art Gallery and Museum in 1927 for the Twentieth Annual Exhibition of Works by Artists of the Northern Counties, priced at £31 10s. Purchased from Maryon by the Laing Art Gallery in 1929. Exhibited at the Reading Museum & Town Hall from 5 June 1976 to 3 July 1976 as part of the exhibition Art and the University, from 1860, and at the Laing Art Gallery from 27 October 2018 to 3 March 2019 as part of the exhibition Exposed: The Naked Portrait.
Colour photograph of a 1929 silver medal awarded by the Berkshire County Council	Berkshire County Council medal	c. 1927			Designed by Maryon. Multiple copies executed, in silver and in bronze. Exhibited at Laing Art Gallery and Museum in 1927 for the Twentieth Annual Exhibition of Works by Artists of the Northern Counties, not priced for sale. A silver medal awarded in 1928 to the winner of an egg-laying competition. A medal awarded in 1928 to the winner of a farriery competition, and auctioned by Warwick & Warwick in 2013 in a lot including other medals with a high estimate of £30. A silver medal awarded in 1929 to the winner of the Annual Farriery Competition, and auctioned by Noonans in 2012 for £45, and again in 2024 in a lot including other medals for £90. A bronze medal awarded in 1930 to the winner of the Annual Clean Milking Competition, and auctioned by Noonans in 2024 in a lot including other medals for £110. A silver medal awarded in 1940 engraved "Clean Milk Advisory Scheme" and "Tuberculin Tested Section", and auctioned by Noonans in 2024 in a lot including other medals for £130.
Colour photograph of a 1926 silver medal awarded by the National Pig Breeders' Association	National Pig Breeders' Association medal	c. 1927			Designed by Maryon. Multiple copies executed. Exhibited at Laing Art Gallery and Museum in 1927 for the Twentieth Annual Exhibition of Works by Artists of the Northern Counties, not priced for sale. One copy held by the British Museum (bronze, 1937), another by the Horsham Museum (silver, 1929), and two by the Science Museum Group (bronze, 1929 & 1930).
	University of Reading medal	c. 1927			Designed by Maryon. Exhibited at Laing Art Gallery and Museum in 1927 for the Twentieth Annual Exhibition of Works by Artists of the Northern Counties, not priced for sale.
	Merchant Adventurer	1927			Exhibited at Laing Art Gallery and Museum in 1927 for the Twentieth Annual Exhibition of Works by Artists of the Northern Counties, priced at £125.
	Shepherd	1927			Exhibited at Laing Art Gallery and Museum in 1927 for the Twentieth Annual Exhibition of Works by Artists of the Northern Counties, priced at £15 15s.
	Nymph	1927			Exhibited at Laing Art Gallery and Museum in 1927 for the Twentieth Annual Exhibition of Works by Artists of the Northern Counties, priced at £15 15s.
	Garden Figure	1927			Exhibited at Laing Art Gallery and Museum in 1927 for the Twentieth Annual Exhibition of Works by Artists of the Northern Counties, priced at £52 10s.
Black and white photograph of students dancing around Statue of Industry after tarring it	Statue of Industry	1929			Made for the 1929 North East Coast Exhibition, a world's fair held at Newcastle upon Tyne. Tarred and feathered on the night of 25 October 1929 by several hundred students from Armstrong College.
Colour photograph of a bronze memorial tablet	Memorial to George Stephenson	1929		George Stephenson's Birthplace, Wylam, Northumberland	Unveiled 8 June 1929. A replica of the memorial was cast at the works of Sir Archibald Ross, and unveiled in the headquarters of the Institution of Mechanical Engineers on 20 February 1931.
	Memorial to Charles Parsons	1932		Discovery Museum, Newcastle upon Tyne	Bronze tablet, cast at the Thames Ditton Foundry, mounted on green marble from Connemara. Unveiled on 2 December 1932 at C. A. Parsons and Company. Sometime after 2003 the building was demolished and the plaque was donated to the Discovery Museum, where as of 2016 there were plans to place it on display.

=== Attributed ===
Image	Title/Description	Date	Dimensions	Location	Comments
	Copper lidded jug	c. 1900	14 cm high		Auctioned by Mellors & Kirk in 2023 for £110, "the design attributed to Herbert Maryon". As of 2026, for sale by Hill House Antiques & Decorative Arts Limited for £650.
	Silver and enamel pendant necklace		4.5 cm high		Stamped "KSIA". Sold by Hill House Antiques & Decorative Arts Limited in 2005. Auctioned by Woolley & Wallis in 2023 for £550, "the design attributed to Herbert Maryon, possibly made by Isabel McBean".
	Brass vase		20.5 cm high		Pentagonal case with slightly flared rim. Auctioned by Thompson Roddick Auctioneers & Valuers in 2022, "[a]ttributed to Herbert Maryon."

== Bibliography ==
- Art and the University from 1860. Reading: Reading Museum and Art Gallery. 1976. OCLC 2947934.
- "Arts and Crafts". New Zealand International Exhibition, 1906–7: Fine Art Section, Official Catalogue (PDF). Christchurch: Christchurch Press Company Limited. 1906. pp. 58–90.
- B., H. B. (October 1906a). "Studio Talk: Liverpool". The Studio. XXXIX (163): 167–169.
- B., H. B. (December 1906b). "Studio Talk: Liverpool". The International Studio. XXX (118): 167–169.
- Baldry, Alfred Lys (June 1900). "The Art of 1900". The Studio. XX (87): 3–36.
- "The Bernard Gilpin Memorial in Kentmere Church". The Northern Counties Magazine. II (7): 2, 54–55. April 1901.
- Bruce, Ian (2001). The Loving Eye and Skilful Hand: The Keswick School of Industrial Arts. Carlisle: Bookcase.
- Catalogue of the Sixth Exhibition. London: Arts & Crafts Exhibition Society. 1899.
- Catalogue of the Eighth Exhibition. London: Arts & Crafts Exhibition Society. 1906.
- Catalogue of the Ninth Exhibition. London: Arts & Crafts Exhibition Society. 1910.
- Catalogue of the Twentieth Annual Exhibition of Works of Artists of the Northern Counties. Newcastle upon Tyne: Laing Art Gallery and Museum. 1927. OCLC 173997307.
- "Chronicle of Art—January". The Magazine of Art. 1: 153–156. 1903.
- Curtis, W. D. (1907). The Log of H.M.S. 'Cumberland'. The Log Series. London: The Westminster Press.
- The Exhibition of the Royal Academy of Arts. Vol. 146. London: Royal Academy of Arts. 1914.
- Gregory, Edward W. (June–September 1901). "Home Arts and Industries". The Artist: An Illustrated Monthly Record of Arts, Crafts and Industries. XXXI (259). New York: Truslove, Hanson & Comba: 135–140. doi:10.2307/25581626. JSTOR 25581626.
- "Illustrations of Memorial, Birds, Woven hangings, Wood Work, Book Covers, Silver Work, Jewellery, Gesso Work, etc". The Art Workers' Quarterly. II (5): 17–28. January 1903.
- The Institution of Mechanical Engineers (June 1931). "Unveiling of Replica of Tablet Affixed to George Stephenson's Cottage at Wylam-on-Tyne". Proceedings of the Institution of Mechanical Engineers. 120: iv, 249–251. doi:10.1243/PIME_PROC_1931_120_012_02.
- Maryon, Herbert (April 1906). "Metal Work: V.—Repoussé". Arts & Crafts. IV (23). London: Hutchinson & Co.: 237–240. OCLC 225804755.
- Pevsner, Nikolaus (1967). Cumberland and Westmoreland. The Buildings of England. New Haven: Yale University Press. ISBN 0-300-09590-2.
- Shrigley, Ruth, ed. (1994). Inspired by Design: The Arts and Crafts Collection of The Manchester Metropolitan University. Manchester: Manchester City Art Galleries. ISBN 0-901673-48-X.
- "Studio Talk: Keswick". The Studio. XVIII (71): 210–212. January 1903.
- "Studio Talk: Keswick". The Studio. XXXVI (153): 263–264. December 1905.
- "Studio Talk: Keswick". The Studio. XXVII (107): 263–264. January 1906.
- Thornsby, Frederick W., ed. (1912). Dictionary of Organs and Organists. Bournemouth: H. Logan & Company.
- Wood, Esther (June 1900a). "The Home Arts and Industries Exhibition at the Albert Hall". The Studio. XX (87): 78–88.
- Wood, Esther (July 1900b). "The Home Arts and Industries Exhibition at the Albert Hall". The International Studio. XI (41). New York: John Lane Co.: 78–88.
- Wood, Esther (July 1902). "The Home Arts and Industries Association". The Studio. XXVI (112): 129–134.

Walker Gallery Autumn exhibition catalogues

- Thirty-fourth Autumn Exhibition of Modern Art. Liverpool: Corporation of Liverpool, Walker Art Gallery. 1904. OCLC 22433402.
- Thirty-fifth Autumn Exhibition of Modern Art: Catalogue. Liverpool: Corporation of Liverpool, Walker Art Gallery. 1905. OCLC 22433402.
- Thirty-sixth Autumn Exhibition of Modern Art: Catalogue. Liverpool: Corporation of Liverpool, Walker Art Gallery. 1906. OCLC 22433402.
- Fortieth Autumn Exhibition of Modern Art: Catalogue (7th ed.). Liverpool: Corporation of Liverpool, Walker Art Gallery. 1910. OCLC 22433402.
