= Admiral Ross =

Admiral Ross may refer to:

- Charles Ross (Royal Navy officer) (1776–1849), British Royal Navy vice admiral
- Erik M. Ross (born 1965), U.S. Navy rear admiral
- George Campbell Ross (1900–1993), British Royal Navy rear admiral
- John Ross (Royal Navy officer) (1777–1856), British Royal Navy rear admiral
- Philip H. Ross (1905–1981), U.S. Navy rear admiral
- William J. Ross (Star Trek), fictional Starfleet vice admiral in the TV series, Star Trek: Deep Space Nine

== See also ==
- Worth G. Ross (1854–1916), U.S. Revenue Cutter Service captain-commandant (equivalent rank before use of the admiral rank in the U.S.)
