= Archibald Ross =

Archibald Ross may refer to:

- Sir Archibald Ross (marine engineer) (1867–1931), British marine engineer
- Sir Archibald Ross (diplomat) (1911–1996), British diplomat and civil servant
- Archibald Hilson Ross (1821–1900), New Zealand member of parliament and mayor of Dunedin
