= Statue of Industry =

Sculpture by Herbert Maryon

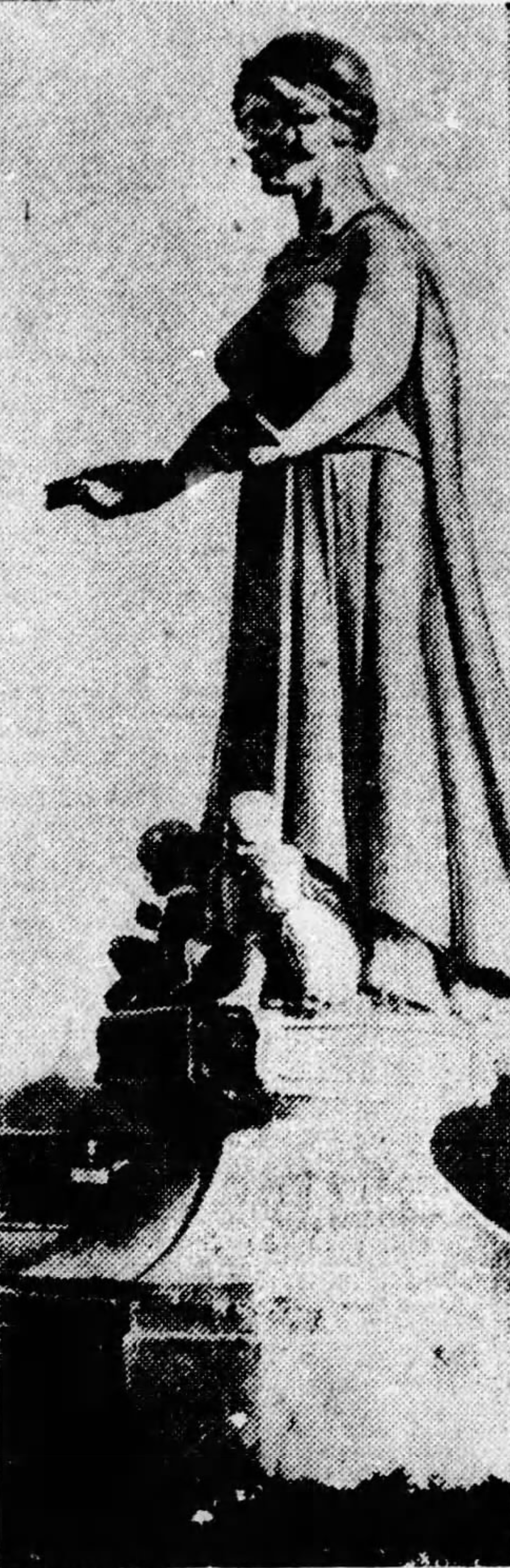
- Statue of Industry
- Artist: Herbert Maryon
- Year: 1929
- Medium: Plaster over steel frame
- Dimensions: 23 feet (7 m)

Statue of Industry was a 1929 sculpture by the English artist Herbert Maryon. The 23-foot (7-metre) tall work depicted a woman with a model of Tyne-built RMS Mauretania in one hand, a model of a turbo alternator in the other, and three children at her feet. It was a prominent attraction at the North East Coast Exhibition, a world's fair-type event in Newcastle intended to showcase the manufacturing-centric capabilities of a region which was in the midst of a post-war recession. It remained at the Exhibition from May 1929 opening to October 1929 closing. Afterwards, the plaster-on-steel statue was copper-metalized to better withstand the elements, and sold to the engineering firm A. Reyrolle & Company in Hebburn; it remained there until at least 1931.

Statue of Industry, wrote a local paper, "had her admirers; she had her withering critics". Writing at the outset of the Exhibition that the statue "impressed all who gazed on it", the paper nonetheless came to term it "a monstrosity", and published many critical letters to the editor. In the closing days of the Exhibition, students from nearby Armstrong College, where Maryon was master of sculpture, tarred and feathered the work—a mode of criticism recently employed on sculptures by Jacob Epstein and George Frampton. The attack was widely reported and criticised, with observers noting the outrage that would have ensued had "ordinary working lads" been responsible rather than privileged university students.

== Background ==
=== North East Coast Exhibition ===
The North East Coast Exhibition was an event held in Newcastle from May to October 1929. The brainchild of the Newcastle and Gateshead Chamber of Commerce, the Exhibition was intended to spur economic development in the region; a post-war recession had led to an unemployment rate of 61% in 1926, including 50,000 skilled engineers and shipbuilders. Initially, it was planned as a showcase for the region's (mostly manufacturing) products, although the scope broadened to also include a large entertainment component.

The Exhibition was situated in a corner of the Town Moor, a mile from the railway station and 300 yards from Armstrong College, then part of Durham University. It featured a massive Palace of Engineering and a Palace of Industries. The Palace of Engineering included models illustrating the region's expertise in fields such as railways, shipbuilding, bridge building, and mining; the Palace of Industries focused on consumer products, with exhibitions from brands such as Pyrex, Hoover (displaying its vacuums), and Singer. Other structures included the Palace of Arts, with more than 300 artworks on loan, a Festival Hall, a sports stadium, and many smaller pavilions and kiosks.

=== Herbert Maryon ===
When he began work on Statue of Industry, Herbert Maryon was 54 years old, and a year into his position as master of sculpture at Armstrong College. Maryon had studied at The Slade, Saint Martin's School of Art, and the Central School of Arts and Crafts. He then served as the first director of the Keswick School of Industrial Art from 1900 to 1904, where he designed numerous Arts and Crafts works, taught metalwork at the Storey Institute, and then from 1907 to 1927 at the University of Reading as a teacher of metalwork, modelling, and casting. While at Reading Maryon had designed several large works, including First World War monuments for East Knoyle, Mortimer, and the University of Reading. He remained at Armstrong until 1939; after the Second World War, Maryon went on a second career as a conservator at the British Museum, where his work on the Sutton Hoo ship-burial led to his appointment as an Officer of the Order of the British Empire.

== Design ==
Statue of Industry depicted a woman standing on a pedestal. The statue was 23 feet (7 m) tall, the figure accounting for 15 of those feet (4.6 m). One of her hands held a model of RMS Mauretania, which had been built in Tyne; the other held a model of a turbo alternator. Children surrounded her feet, representing the large population of Tyneside.

The three-tonne statue was made of fibrous plaster surrounding a frame of steel. The dimensions of Maryon's studio entrance necessitated the statue's composition; it was made in sections, none more than 4.5 feet (1.4 m) long, and shaped with tools including axes and chisels. The plaster was mixed in basins, then applied to the sections. When done, it was painted cream and gold. As a plaster work intended for the outdoors, it was designed to last for only a year.

== History ==
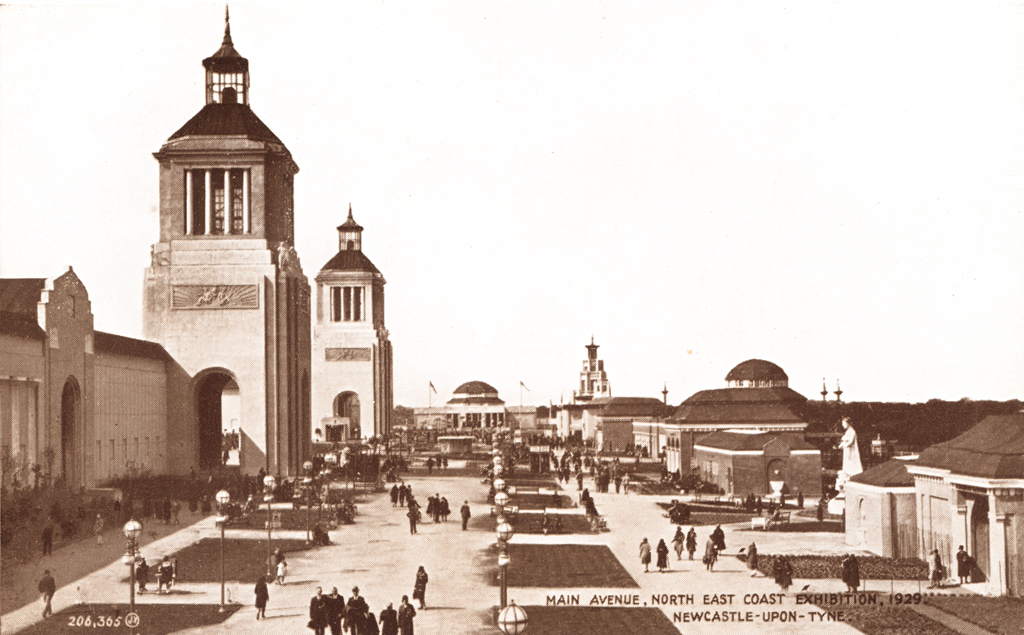
The Exhibition, with Statue of Industry to the right

=== Creation ===
Maryon started by creating a small sketch model of the statue. He began the full work in September 1928, with assistance from his students.

The statue was installed near the entrance of the Exhibition on 22 April 1929. (Note: The Exhibition also included eight smaller statues of women adorning two towers. Those eight, wrote the Evening Chronicle, were "in garb highly conducive to catching influenza", whereas Statue of Industry was (per the South Wales Daily Post) "adequately clothed".) It was installed in sections; there to witness it, a reporter for the South Wales Daily Post wrote of seeing a "decapitated three-ton lady" suspended in mid-air, with "her head and shoulders" resting on the ground. Plaster was applied on site, taking a fortnight to set; afterwards, the paint was applied.

=== Reception ===
"She had her admirers", wrote the Evening Chronicle; "she had her withering critics". Though at the outset of the Exhibition, the paper wrote that Statue of Industry "impressed all who gazed on it", those letters to the editor it printed fell firmly into the latter camp, and the paper itself came to call the statue "[t]he dour lady of the North-East Exhibition". Writers declared it a "hideous monstrosity" ("for the sake of us all, either remove the eyesore or keep it permanently covered"); "a credit to neither art nor womanhood" ("Why not re-christen it the Spectre of Unemployment?"); "like an Epstein fright" ("if there is artistic beauty in the statue hundreds of Exhibition visitors would be delighted to know precisely where it lies"); "repulsive" ("the figure in question is merely regarded with amusement and ridiculed"); and "the ugliest sight in the Exhibition" ("if [progress] needs this distorted effigy of womanhood to typify it, the sooner we get back to the conventional the better"). At a local Rotary Club meeting, one member called it "repulsive—an ugly woman holding in her hands microscopic representations of shipbuilding and engineering. At her feet, preventing progress were three figures which he first thought to be rats, but which on closer examination turned out to be triplets."

Coming to the statue's defence, one writer criticised "the thoughtless and ill-natured criticism of those who care for little save the conventional". The writer posited that the statue "typifies our Tyneside development, founded and maintained by the sea", in that it was "deliberately modelled and built up from the figure-head convention of our three-deckers and sailing ships of our grand-fathers"—leaning forward, gazing out at the horizon, and evoking "that curious wooden solidity typical of the figure-head and the Tynesider all over the world". In the paper's next issue, a reader had a rebuttal: "I can hardly think that the designer of the Statue would deliberately set out to demonstrate to the world that the chief characteristic of local industry is 'wooden solidity.'" (Note: At the end of the Exhibition, the Evening Courier had a contest to determine what had been the most popular attractions, as ranked from a list of 18. Statue of Industry do not place within the top 10.)

=== Tarring ===
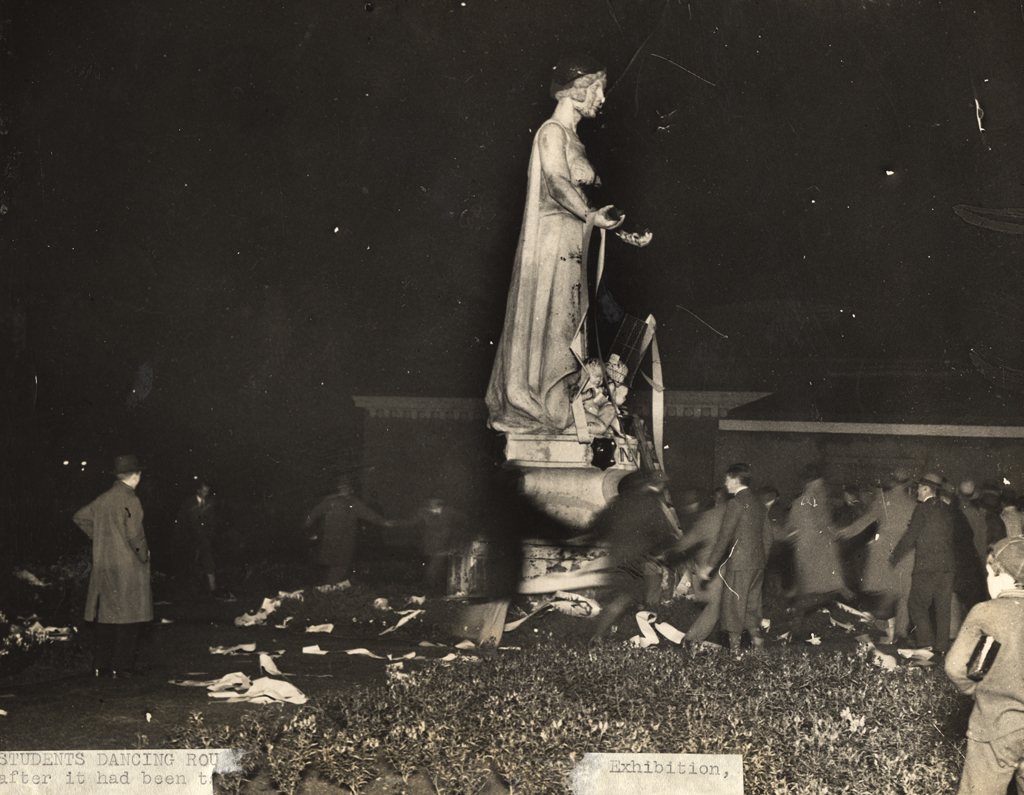
Students dancing around Statue of Industry after tarring and feathering it

By October 1929, several statues in London had been defaced, particularly by tarring and feathering, as an expression of criticism. Some of this reflected tension between different schools of art, although it was also partly attributable to university students out for a "rag". In 1925, Jacob Epstein's sculpture Rima was splattered with green paint, and in 1928, George Frampton's statue of Peter Pan was tarred and feathered. Then, on the night of 8 October 1929, Rima was tarred and feathered, and on the 15th, a similar attempt was made on Night, another of Epstein's sculptures.

On Thursday, 24 October 1929, the Evening Chronicle reported that "students and others" were preparing festivities to mark the final day of the Exhibition on Saturday. Statue of Industry, the paper reported, "has been mentioned as 'the centre of attraction,' for many of the games which are part of these festive programmes". As it turned out, several groups of students at Armstrong College, particularly those studying engineering and medicine, had been plotting separately. To one-up the medical students, the engineers struck on Friday, 25 October; several hundred students surrounded, then tarred and feathered, the statue. (Note: Another idea in consideration, claimed a student, was to drill holes in the statue and blow it up, but this was ultimately deemed too dangerous.) Around 80 police officers had to be called to disperse the students, at times using water cannons on not only students, but also photographers stationed on a roof.

The tarring was widely reported. (Note: Including in the Grimsby Daily Telegraph, the Birmingham Evening Despatch, the Nottingham Evening Post, the Leicester Mercury, the Liverpool Post & Mercury, the Leicester Mail, The Manchester Guardian, the Hull The Daily Mail, and the Liverpool Evening Express.) It was also widely criticised. The Evening Chronicle called it a rag "without a purpose", and termed the perpetrators "a band of students whose high spirits outran their intelligence and their manners". "The effigy in question may be a monstrosity worthy of Epstein at his worst," it wrote, "but that is no excuse for an inept piece of horseplay that does little credit to its perpetrators." One reader wrote in to "express my disgust" at the actions: "While, personally, admitting the ugliness of the 'erection,' there is no reason why, at this stage of the Exhibition, a crowd of silly, irresponsible fools should run amok in such fashion." Another called the tarring "scandalous": "It is a pity the crowd of spectators present did not get the pots of tar and give them the contents on their own heads." The relative privilege of the students, "who are supposed to be taking a course of higher education, such as working lads are not privileged to get", was also noted, with a reader commenting that "I shudder to think what would have happened if ordinary working lads had perpetrated the outrage". Armstrong's newly appointed Principal Sir William Marris admonished the students in a speech, suggesting that their energy would be better spent raising money for charity. One student ended up admitting the tarring to have been "in extremely bad taste", agreeing that "had it been perpetrated by a group of miners or news-boys would universally have been stigmatised as an inexcusable outrage". As a 1999 history of the exhibition noted, the tarring was also "all too representative of the region's industry".

Overnight, the statue was cleaned with petrol; it stood gleaming again in the morning. The day after the tarring, however, rumours circulated about another possible attack to mark the Exhibition's closing night. No attempt was made; a dozen police officers guarded the statue, and prevented crowds from milling too long. On Monday, Maryon released a statement on the incident: "Industry is not a pretty, simpering thing. The statue of the woman represents industry as we know it in the North-East—one who has passed through hard times and is now ready to face the future strong and undismayed." Two months later, in December, three students at King's College tarred statues as part of a rivalry with University College, and in the process inadvertently poured tar on the school's war memorial. After the Principal, William Reginald Halliday, threatened to close the college for the term, the students confessed and were suspended two terms—until the following October. According to The Sunday Sun, "it was deemed essential that strict measures should be taken" due to the spate of recent raggings, including against Statue of Industry.

=== Post-Exhibition ===
Much of the Exhibition was broken down and sold afterwards, both as objects (such as chairs and staff uniforms) and raw materials (such as steel, timber, and asbestos sheeting). Inquiries were also received for Statue of Industry. One such offer, claimed the Evening Chronicle, was from "a gentleman from Ponteland" who "would knock the statue off its pedestal and use that as a bird bath"; twelve days later, The Sunday Sun made the claim that a "Newcastle business man with a handsome garden out Ponteland way has offered £1 for the three babies from the Statue of Industry with the purpose of 'turning them loose' in his rockery". A day after the Evening Chronicle reported on difficulties selling the statue, a reader wrote in to suggest that it be moved to Roker Park as "a mascot to the woe-begone football team" there, Sunderland A.F.C., and rechristened "Alice in Blunderland".

The statue was ultimately purchased by the Hebburn-based engineering firm A. Reyrolle & Company. The Evening Chronicle claimed that the company itself was uninterested, but that its managing director, Henry William Clothier, had "taken a personal interest in the future of the statue", and suggested that the statue would probably be placed on the company's Sports Ground. Asked the paper, "Oh! What Will Hebburn Say?"

The statue was removed in late February or early March 1930, using a derrick, three lorries, and several workmen. Before its new installation, it was copper-metalized, to better withstand the elements. The following year, members of the Junior Chamber of Commerce visited the company, and saw Statue of Industry in its new location.

== Other versions ==
At the time the statue was installed, there were plans to sell copies at the Exhibition of Maryon's sketch model. These plans were ultimately abandoned. Maryon's model was left in a cupboard at the Exhibition; only months afterward, wrote the Evening Chronicle, was it "rescued from its dungeon by Councillor A. W. Lambert". The Evening Chronicle exclaimed that Lambert, the chairman of the Exhibition Committee, "is keeping it as a memento!"

== Bibliography ==
- Ayris, Ian (1999). "Newcastle On Show: The North East Coast Exhibition, 1929". In Flowers, Anna & Histon, Vanessa (eds.). Water Under the Bridges: Newcastle's Twentieth Century. Newcastle upon Tyne: Tyne Bridge Publishing. pp. 67–78. ISBN 1-85795-140-9.
- Barke, Michael (March 2014). "The North East Coast Exhibition of 1929: Entrenchment or Modernity?". Northern History. LI (1): 153–176. doi:10.1179/0078172X13Z.00000000050. S2CID 161096652.
- The North-East Coast Exhibition: Newcastle-upon-Tyne, May–October 1929. Newcastle upon Tyne: Andrew Reid and Company. 1929. OCLC 45090029.
- Richardson, Hugh (6 July 1929). "The North-East Coast Exhibition at Newcastle-upon-Tyne". Nature. 124 (3114). London: Macmillan & Co., Ltd.: 18, 27. Bibcode:1929Natur.124...18R. doi:10.1038/124018a0.
