= Listed buildings in South Kilvington =

South Kilvington is a civil parish in the county of North Yorkshire, England. It contains six listed buildings that are recorded in the National Heritage List for England. Of these, one is listed at Grade II*, the middle of the three grades, and the others are at Grade II, the lowest grade. The parish contains the village of South Kilvington and the surrounding countryside. The listed buildings consist of a church, a mill and mill house, a farmhouse and three houses.

== Key ==
Grade	Criteria
II*	Particularly important buildings of more than special interest
II	Buildings of national importance and special interest

== Buildings ==
Name and location	Photograph	Date	Notes	Grade
St Wilfrid's Church; 54.24994°N 1.34791°W		12th century	The church has been altered and enlarged through the centuries. It is built in stone, partly rendered, and has a Welsh slate roof. The church consists of a nave, a south porch and a chancel, and on the west end is a shingled bell tower with a pyramidal roof and a weathervane. There are Norman windows on the south wall of the nave and the north wall of the chancel, and the chancel has a remodelled Norman doorway. The east window has three lights with trefoil heads and three quatrefoils above.	II*
Mill and Mill House; 54.25151°N 1.35005°W		18th century	The mill is the earlier part, with the house dating from the 19th century. They are in red brink, with roofs of slate and pantile at the rear. The house has two storeys and three bays. In the centre is a doorway, flanked by canted bay windows, and above are three sash windows under segmental arches. The mill has three storeys and three bays. On the central bay is a segmental-headed cart door, the windows are horizontally sliding sashes, and there are loading doors. To the left is a single-storey single-bay outbuilding.	II
Pasture Farmhouse; 54.24643°N 1.33650°W	—	Mid to late 18th century	The farmhouse is in light red brick, with a floor band, stepped and dentilled eaves, and a swept pantile roof. There are two storeys and three bays. On the front is a doorway with a rectangular fanlight, above it is a blocked opening, and the windows are sashes in architraves.	II
Grove House; 54.25100°N 1.34830°W	—	Early 19th century	The house is in pale brown brick, and has a stone slate roof with raised verges, stone coping and shaped kneelers. There are three storeys and three bays. In the centre is a projecting Tuscan porch with reeded attached columns and pilasters, an entablature and a cornice, and a doorway with an oblong fanlight. The windows are sashes in architraves under cambered gauged brick arches.	II
Tanfield House; 54.25091°N 1.34873°W	—	Early to mid-19th century	The house is in pale brown brick, and has a pantile roof with stone coping and shaped kneelers. There are two storeys and three bays, and a later single-bay extension on the left. The doorway has pilasters, an entablature and an oblong fanlight, and the windows are sashes under cambered gauged brick arches.	II
The Old Rectory; 54.25043°N 1.34734°W	—	Early to mid-19th century	The house is in pale brown brick, with pilasters, a stucco sill band, and a hipped Welsh slate roof. There are two storeys and five bays. In the centre is a porch, and the windows are sashes.	II
