= South Kilvington =

Village and civil parish in North Yorkshire, England

Coordinates: 54°15′00″N 1°20′55″W

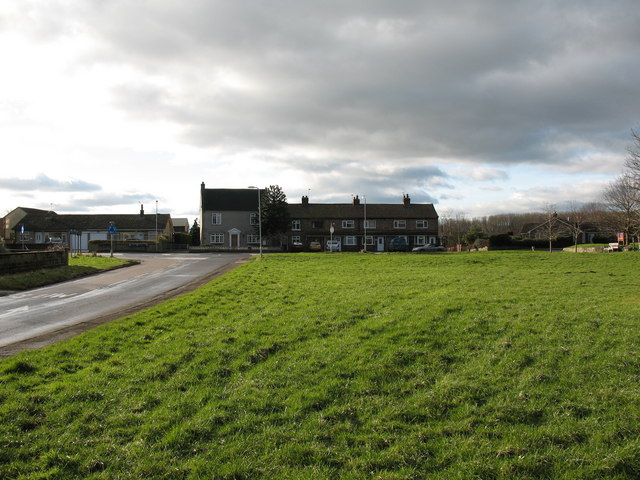
- Village Green, South Kilvington

- Location within North Yorkshire
- Population: 243 (2011 census)
- OS grid reference: SE425840
- Civil parish: South Kilvington
- Unitary authority: North Yorkshire
- Ceremonial county: North Yorkshire
- Region: Yorkshire and the Humber
- Country: England
- Sovereign state: United Kingdom
- Post town: THIRSK
- Postcode district: YO7
- Police: North Yorkshire
- Fire: North Yorkshire
- Ambulance: Yorkshire
- UK Parliament: Thirsk and Malton

South Kilvington is a village and civil parish in North Yorkshire, England. It is situated just off the A19, about one mile north of Thirsk.

== History ==
The village is mentioned in the Domesday Book of 1086 as Cheluitun in the Yarlestre hundred. The entry refers to the area around North Kilvington that was owned by Earl Edwin at the time of the Norman Conquest in 1066, and then granted to the Crown. During the 13th century, the lands became the demesne of Roger de Mowbray and around 1637, after many lands had been divided, the lord of the manor was Sir Arthur Ingram.

Henry Percy, 4th Earl of Northumberland was supposedly killed here in 1489 by a mob of protesters against taxation.

Thornbrough House in the parish of South Kilvington was home to Matthew Carter, who died there in 1666 at the reported age of 112. His life would have spanned the reigns of six monarchs from Mary I to Charles II, the English Civil War and Restoration. While Carter did not match the claimed longevity of fellow Yorkshire supercentenarian Henry Jenkins, they were contemporaries.

In the 19th century South Kilvington was widely known for its village idiots who became a popular spectacle for visitors.

== Governance ==
South Kilvington lies within the Thirsk and Malton UK Parliament constituency and the Hillside and Raskelf electoral division. Historically the parish and village were in the wapentake of Birdforth, and in the Thirsk Rural District, until 1974, when it was moved into the newer county of North Yorkshire, from the old county of the North Riding of Yorkshire. From 1974 to 2023 it was part of the Hambleton District, it is now administered by the unitary North Yorkshire Council.

== Geography ==
The original route of the A19 used to run through the village, it is now the A61. Cod Beck flows to the west of the village as part of the tributary system of the River Swale.

The 1881 UK Census recorded the population as 261. In the 2001 census, the parish had a population of 231 of which 205 were over sixteen years old and 102 of those were in employment. There were 112 dwellings of which 72 were detached.

== Education ==
As of 2017, South Kilvington CE VC Primary school has just under 100 pupils on roll, aged from 4 to 11 years old and is in the catchment area for Thirsk School and Sixth Form College.

== Religion ==
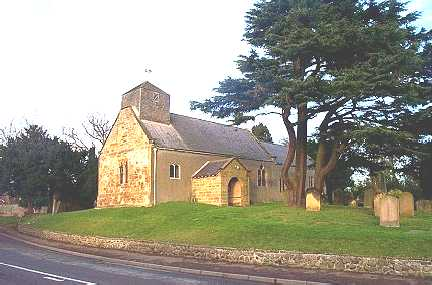
South Kilvington, St Wilfred's Church

St Wilfrid's Church, South Kilvington, is thought to date from the reign of Henry III though Saxon cross fragments found in the churchyard indicate there may have been an older structure on the site. The church is a Grade II* listed building.

In 1618, John Bramhall, later Archbishop of Armagh within the Church of Ireland, was presented with the living at South Kilvington by Christopher Wandesford.

== See also ==
- Listed buildings in South Kilvington
