= George Campbell Ross =

Royal Navy Admiral (1900–1993)

George Campbell Ross CB CBE (9 August 1900 – 30 July 1993) was an Engineer and a Rear Admiral in Britain's Royal Navy. He was also the son of Sir Archibald Ross OBE (1867 - March 19, 1931), a pioneering marine engineer.

== Service biography ==
=== World War I ===
He served on HMS Warspite, HM Submarine P59 and HMS Vendetta during World War I.

=== Interwar ===
Engineering Courses at RN College, Greenwich, and RN Engineering College, Keyham 1919–1921; HMS Hawkins, Flagship of China Station 1921–1924. Lecturer in Marine Engineering, RN Engineering College 1924–1927; HMS Effingham, Flagship of East Indies Station 1927–1929; HM Dockyard, Chatham 1929–1931; HMS Rodney (29), Atlantic Fleet 1931–1933; Invergordon Mutiny 1931; Assistant Naval Attache, British Embassy, Tokyo 1933–1936; Liaison Officer to Japanese Flagship Asigara, Coronation Review 1937; introduced Oerlikon 20 mm cannon to the RN 1937; HMS Manchester, East Indies Station 1937–1939.

=== World War II ===
Engineer-in-Chief's Department, Admiralty 1939–1941; Engineer Officer, HMS Nelson, and Staff Engineer Officer to Flag Officer, Force H, Malta Convoy, North Africa and Sicily 1941–1943; HMS ST ANGELO, Malta, as Staff Engineer Officer, on staff of Capt, Force 'H', Aug–Dec 1943; surrender of Italian Fleet 1943; Aircraft Maintenance and Repair Department, Admiralty 1943–1947;

=== Postwar ===
Chief of Staff to R Adm, Reserve Aircraft 1948–1949; Director of Aircraft Maintenance and Repair, Admiralty 1949–1953; retired in October 1953. After retirement from the Royal Navy Ross joined Armstrong Siddeley as a liaison officer between the company and the Admiralty.

== Family life ==
He married, on 16 September 1929 Alice Behrens, daughter of the banker Paul Behrens (of the Salomon Oppenheim bank) in Berlin, the first German women to marry an Englishman after World War I.
