= HMS Cumberland (1902) =

Cruiser of the Royal Navy

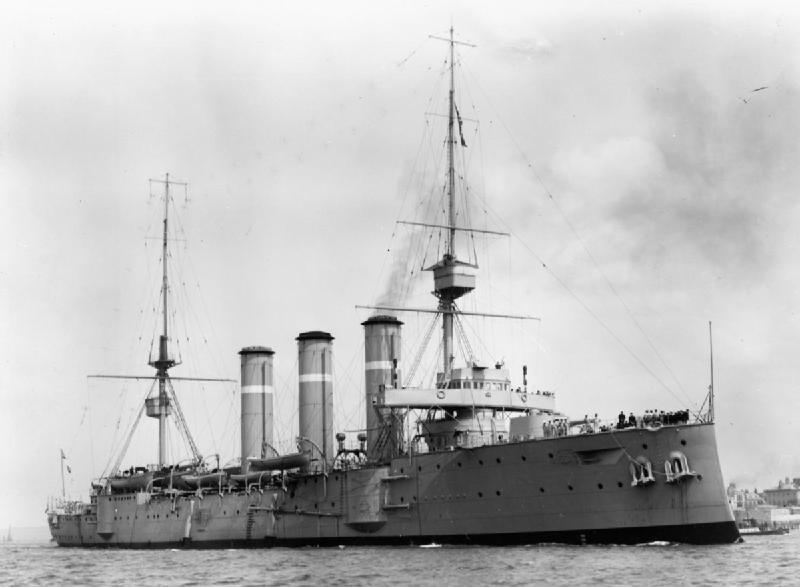
- Cumberland at anchor

History

United Kingdom
- Name: Cumberland
- Namesake: Cumberland
- Builder: London and Glasgow Shipbuilding, Govan
- Laid down: 19 February 1901
- Launched: 16 December 1902
- Completed: 1 December 1904
- Decommissioned: Paid off, April 1920
- Fate: Sold for scrap, 9 May 1921

General characteristics
- Class & type: Monmouth-class armoured cruiser
- Displacement: 9,800 long tons (10,000 t) (normal)
- Length: 463 ft 6 in (141.3 m) (o/a)
- Beam: 66 ft (20.1 m)
- Draught: 25 ft (7.6 m)
- Installed power: 31 water-tube boilers; 22,000 ihp (16,000 kW)
- Propulsion: 2 × shafts; 2 × triple-expansion steam engines
- Speed: 23 knots (43 km/h; 26 mph)
- Complement: 678
- Armament: 2 × twin, 10 × single 6 in (152 mm) guns; 10 × single 12-pdr (3 in (76 mm)) guns; 3 × single 3-pdr (1.9 in (47 mm)) guns; 2 × 18 in (450 mm) torpedo tubes
- Armour: Belt: 2–4 in (51–102 mm); Decks: 0.75–2 in (19–51 mm); Barbettes: 4 in (102 mm); Turrets: 4 in (102 mm); Conning tower: 10 in (254 mm)

HMS Cumberland was one of 10 Monmouth-class armoured cruisers built for the Royal Navy in the first decade of the 20th century. She was assigned to the 2nd Cruiser Squadron of the Channel Fleet upon completion in 1903. After a refit in 1907–1908 she became a training ship in the Home Fleet. She was sent to West Africa after the beginning of World War I in August 1914 and captured 10 German merchant ships in September. Cumberland spent the rest of the war on convoy escort duties and patrolling for German commerce raiders. She was sold for scrap in 1921 and broken up two years later.

== Design and description ==
The Monmouths were intended to protect British merchant shipping from fast cruisers like the French Guichen, Châteaurenault or the Dupleix class. The ships were designed to displace 9,800 long tons (10,000 t). They had an overall length of 463 feet 6 inches (141.3 m), a beam of 66 feet (20.1 m) and a deep draught of 25 feet (7.6 m). They were powered by two 4-cylinder triple-expansion steam engines, each driving one shaft using steam provided by 31 Belleville boilers. The engines produced a total of 22,000 indicated horsepower (16,000 kW) which was designed to give the ships a maximum speed of 23 knots (43 km/h; 26 mph). The ships carried a maximum of 1,600 long tons (1,600 t) of coal and her complement consisted of 678 officers and ratings.

The Monmouth-class ships' main armament consisted of fourteen breech-loading (BL) 6-inch (152 mm) Mk VII guns. Four of these guns were mounted in two twin-gun turrets, one each fore and aft of the superstructure, and the others were positioned in casemates amidships. Six of these were mounted on the main deck and were only usable in calm weather. Ten quick-firing (QF) 12-pounder (3-inch (76 mm)) 12-cwt guns (Note: "Cwt" is the abbreviation for hundredweight, 12 cwt referring to the weight of the gun.) were fitted for defence against torpedo boats. Cumberland also carried three 3-pounder 1.9 in (47 mm) Hotchkiss guns and two submerged 18-inch (450 mm) torpedo tubes.

Beginning in 1915, the main deck six-inch guns of the Monmouth-class ships were moved to the upper deck and given gun shields. Their casemates were plated over to improve seakeeping. The twelve-pounder guns displaced by the transfer were repositioned elsewhere. At some point in the war, a pair of three-pounder anti-aircraft guns were installed on the upper deck.

The ship's waterline armour belt was four inches (102 mm) thick amidships and two-inch (51 mm) forward. The armour of the gun turrets, their barbettes and the casemates was four inches thick. The protective deck armour ranged in thickness from 0.75–2 inches (19–51 mm) and the conning tower was protected by ten inches (254 mm) of armour.

== Construction and service ==
Cumberland, named for the English county, was laid down by London and Glasgow Shipbuilding at their shipyard in Govan on 19 February 1901 and launched on 16 December 1902, when she was named by Lady Morpeth. She was completed on 1 December 1904 and assigned to the 2nd Cruiser Squadron of the Channel Fleet. She was transferred to the Home Fleet in December 1906 and was refitted to serve as a cadet training ship from 1907–1908. From May 1912 to July 1914 she was under the command of Captain Aubrey Smith and was present for the July 1914 Fleet review at Spithead.

She was sent to West Africa after the beginning of the war in August and supported operations in the Cameroons where she captured 10 German merchantmen at Douala on 27 September. She was assigned to the 5th Cruiser Squadron in January 1915 where she conducted patrols for German raiders and escorted convoys for the rest of the war.

Cumberland was paid off in April 1920 in Queenstown, Ireland (modern Cobh), and sold to Thos. W. Ward for scrap on 9 May 1921. She was finally broken up at Briton Ferry in 1923.

== See also ==
- The Luck of Cumberland

== Bibliography ==
- Colledge, J. J.; Warlow, Ben & Bush, Steve (2020). Ships of the Royal Navy: The Complete Record of all Fighting Ships of the Royal Navy from the 15th Century to the Present (5th revised and updated ed.). Seaforth Publishing. ISBN 978-1-5267-9327-0.
- Corbett, Julian (1997) [1938]. Naval Operations to the Battle of the Falklands. History of the Great War: Based on Official Documents. Vol. I (2nd ed.). London and Nashville, Tennessee: Imperial War Museum and Battery Press. ISBN 0-89839-256-X.
- Dodson, Aidan (2026). "The Cadet Training Ships of the Royal Navy". In Jordan, John (ed.). Warship 2026. Osprey Publishing. pp. 156–174. ISBN 978-1-4728-7259-3.
- Friedman, Norman (2012). British Cruisers of the Victorian Era. Barnsley, UK: Seaforth. ISBN 978-1-59114-068-9.
- Friedman, Norman (2011). Naval Weapons of World War One: Guns, Torpedoes, Mines and ASW Weapons of All Nations; An Illustrated Directory. Barnsley, UK: Seaforth Publishing. ISBN 978-1-84832-100-7.
- Massie, Robert K. (2003). Castles of Steel: Britain, Germany, and the Winning of the Great War at Sea. New York: Random House. ISBN 0-679-45671-6.
- McBride, Keith (1988). "The First County Class Cruisers of the Royal Navy, Part I: The Monmouths". Warship. 46 (April). London: Conway Maritime Press: 19–26. ISSN 0142-6222.
- Preston, Antony (1985). "Great Britain and Empire Forces". In Gray, Randal (ed.). Conway's All the World's Fighting Ships 1906–1921. Annapolis, Maryland: Naval Institute Press. pp. 1–104. ISBN 0-85177-245-5.
- Roberts, John (1979). "Great Britain and Empire Forces". In Chesneau, Roger & Kolesnik, Eugene M. (eds.). Conway's All the World's Fighting Ships 1860-1905. Greenwich, UK: Conway Maritime Press. pp. 1–113. ISBN 0-8317-0302-4.
- Silverstone, Paul H. (1984). Directory of the World's Capital Ships. New York: Hippocrene Books. ISBN 0-88254-979-0.
- "Transcript: HMS Cumberland - March 1915 to October 1916, North America and West Indies Station (Part 1 of 2)". Royal Navy Log Books of the World War 1 Era. Naval-History.net.
