= The Luck of Cumberland =

Silver loving cup

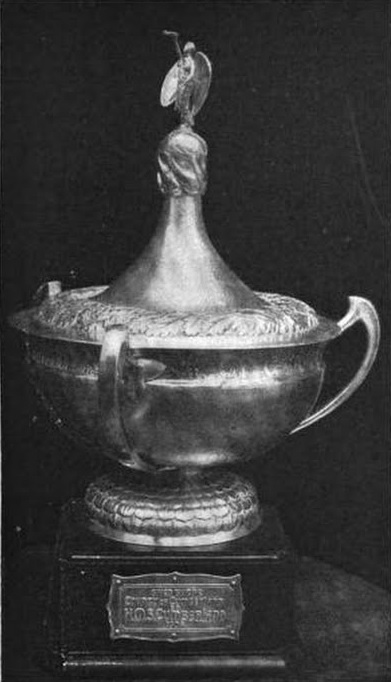
- Artists: Herbert Maryon; Keswick School of Industrial Art
- Year: 1904
- Medium: Silver loving cup
- Dimensions: 18 in (46 cm) high; 12 in (30 cm) wide (without plinth or handles)

The Luck of Cumberland is a silver loving cup presented in 1905 by the county of Cumberland to HMS Cumberland. The work, designed by Herbert Maryon and executed by the Keswick School of Industrial Art, of which he was the director, was presented to the ship shortly after she was commissioned. Newspapers at the time described it as "the most ambitious piece of work yet produced at the school"; a 2001 book on the school described it as a "tour de force" and "a masterpiece".

The cup is made from 200 oz (5.7 kg) of silver, has three handles, and rests on a wooden plinth; without handles or plinth, it measures eighteen inches high and twelve inches wide. The base is decorated with a scale pattern to evoke the sea. The cup is largely plain other than the inscription "The Luck of Cumberland" surrounding the rim, above a faintly traced border of rose leaves. The conical lid, raised from a single piece of silver, is surrounded by a wreath of oak leaves in high relief and topped by a winged figure of victory, which itself stands on a globe supported by dolphins.

The cup cost £100 (equivalent to £13,900 in 2024), raised through a subscription. It was intended to continue a tradition in the county of "lucks" — objects linked to the continued prosperity of a family or community — such as the Luck of Edenhall and the Luck of Muncaster. With leftover donations and a continued drive, the effort was also able to commission a silver bell; the cup was intended for the wardroom mess, and the bell for the men below deck. They were presented while Cumberland was in Quebec, in a ceremony led by Albert Grey, 4th Earl Grey, then the Governor General of Canada.

== Background ==
=== Keswick School of Industrial Art ===
The Keswick School of Industrial Art was founded in 1884 by Hardwicke Rawnsley and his wife Edith to offer classes in metal repoussé. Formed at the beginning of the Arts and Crafts movement, the school quickly expanded to include classes in drawing, design, woodcarving, and metalwork. The school melded commercial and artistic purposes; it sold items such as trays, frames, tables, and clock-cases, and developed a reputation for quality.

In March 1900, Herbert Maryon was hired as the first director of the school. Under Maryon's leadership, the Keswick School expanded the breadth and range of its designs; at the same time, Maryon executed several significant commissions. His best works, wrote the historian of the school Ian Bruce, "drew their inspiration from the nature of the material and his deep understanding of its technical limits", and tended to be in metal. Maryon remained at the school until December 1904. He later taught at the University of Reading and Armstrong College (then part of Durham University), then after the Second World War worked on the restoration of objects from Sutton Hoo for the British Museum.

== History ==
=== Commissioning ===
By June 1904, residents of the county of Cumberland had proposed that a gift be presented to HMS Cumberland, the ship bearing the name of the county. Ideas included an engraved silver bell for the ship; a piece of plate for the ship's wardroom mess; and a silver shield on which to inscribe notable actions of the ship or her crew. Any further suggestions were to be sent to Josslyn Pennington, 5th Baron Muncaster, the Lord Lieutenant of Cumberland.

During a meeting on 3 August 1904, a committee was appointed to recommend the gift — tentatively one of the first two options previously recommended — and report back in October. By that point the cause had raised £103 17s (equivalent to £14,400 in 2024) with nearly half the amount raised from the town of Workington; donations were capped at 10s per person (equivalent to £70 in 2024).

That October, the committee recommended a piece of silver for the wardroom mess — specifically, an eighteen-inch-tall silver loving cup designed by Maryon and made by the Keswick School of Industrial Art, and costing 100 guineas (equivalent to £14,600 in 2024). The committee stipulated that the cup should be strong, usable, and steady, befitting its future home at sea. A model was exhibited at a meeting chaired by Pennington, after which the proposal was adopted; Pennington was also chosen as the person who would present the gift. The name of the cup — The Luck of Cumberland — was also decided. The name was intended to carry on a tradition of "lucks" in the county, (Note: A luck, according to the Oxford English Dictionary, is "An object or (occasionally) person on which the prosperity of a family or community is believed to depend.") such as the Luck of Edenhall and the Luck of Muncaster.

In early December 1904, newspapers reported that the loving cup was nearly completed. Later that month, C. Courtenay Hodgson wrote to a newspaper to state that the final cost of the cup would be £100 (equivalent to £13,900 in 2024), leaving a small remainder. It was therefore proposed to present the ship with an engraved silver bell, estimated to cost £10 to £15 (equivalent to £1,400 to £2,100 in 2024), alongside the cup. The combined gift, he suggested, would "appeal not only to the wardroom mess but to the men of the lower deck". The subscription was therefore left open for several additional weeks, with donations still capped at 10s per person. The cup was finished by May 1905, when it was placed on display in Whitehaven for public viewing.

=== Presentation ===
By August 1905, Cumberland had been ordered from the Mediterranean to Canada. The original plans for Pennington to present the cup and bell were therefore abandoned. The Cumberland anchored in front of a large crowd in Quebec at around 5 p.m. on 19 August. In a ceremony at around 8:30 p.m., Albert Grey, 4th Earl Grey, the Governor General of Canada, presented The Luck of Cumberland and the bell in front of a crowd on the quarterdeck. Grey gave a speech in which he expressed Pennington's wish that the cup and bell would be acceptable gifts, for they showed the appreciation of the people of Cumberland for having the ship named after their county. The cup was filled with wine and handed to Grey, who proposed a toast wishing luck to both ship and county.

=== Subsequent history ===
The history of The Luck of Cumberland following its presentation is not reflected in published sources. Cumberland was sold for scrap in 1921, and broken up two years later. According to Manual of Seamanship, published by Her Majesty's Stationery Office in 1951, trophies of war and presentation plate "are the property of the ship and are recorded in the Ship's Book. Whenever a ship is paid off or broken up the trophies are returned to the manning port of the ship, where they are kept until the ship re-commissions or a new ship of the same name is commissioned."

== Description ==
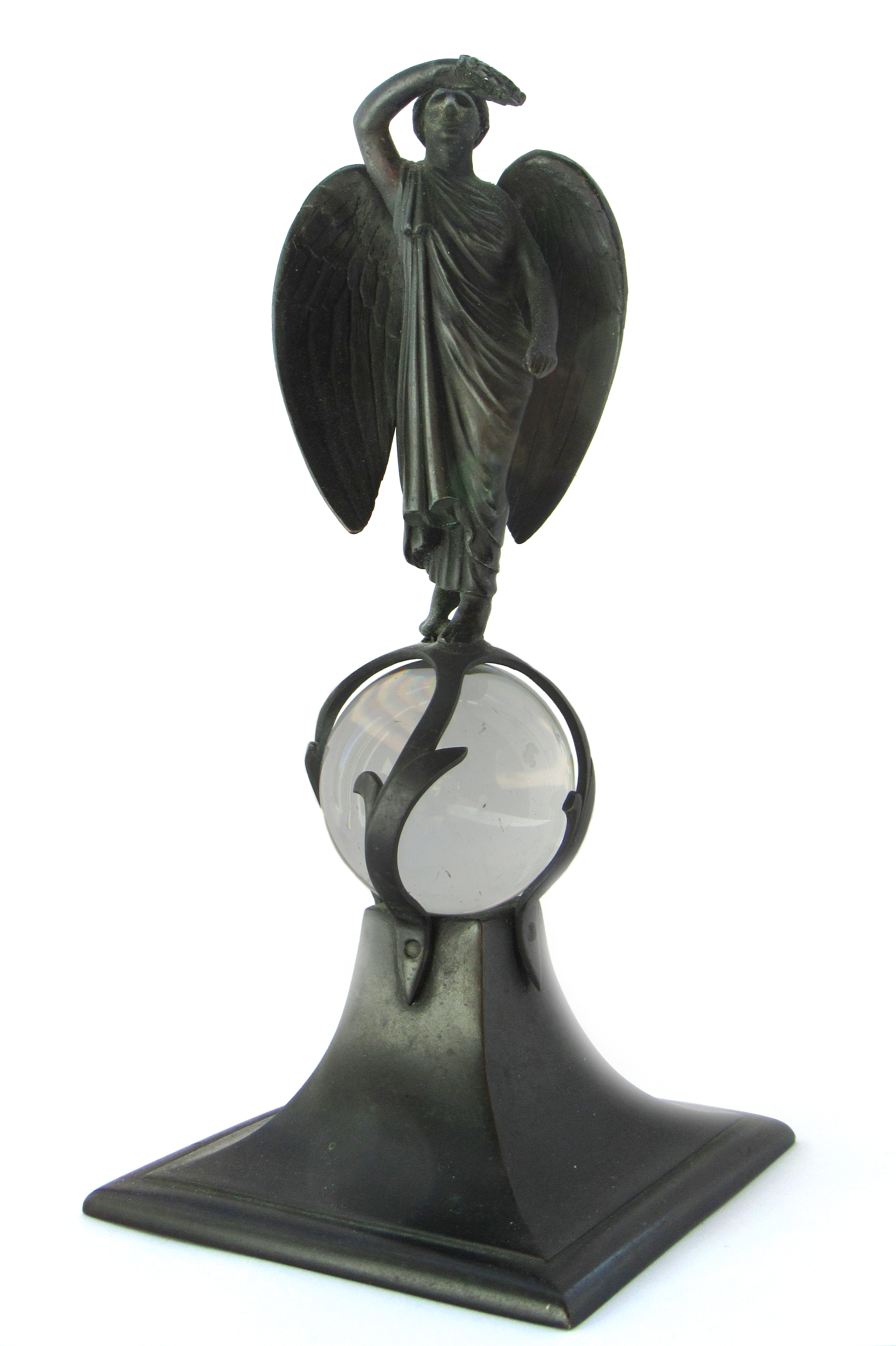
Maryon's Winged Victory, exhibiting a similar figure as that on The Luck of Cumberland

The Luck of Cumberland is made of 200 oz (5.7 kg) of solid beaten silver. It takes the form of a loving cup with three handles, is 12 in (300 mm) across without its handles, and stands 18 in (460 mm) high without its plinth. The base is decorated with a scale pattern, evoking the sea; the bowl is plain other than an inscription, "The Luck of Cumberland", which surrounds the rim above a faintly traced border of rose leaves. The lid is conical and raised from a single sheet of silver. It is surrounded by a wreath of oak leaves in high relief and topped by a winged figure of victory modelled by Maryon, which stands on a globe supported by dolphins.

The cup sits on a plinth made of wood. A silver plaque attached to the plinth bears the inscription "Given by the County of Cumberland to 'H.M.S. Cumberland,' 1905".

== Reception ==
The Luck of Cumberland was the last object Maryon made at Keswick. The Newcastle Evening Chronicle described it at the time as "the most ambitious piece of work yet produced at the school" and "a very fine bit of craftsmanship", and stated that Maryon "is to be congratulated upon having so important a piece of work as his last in connection with the school". The Studio and its American counterpart The International Studio published photographs in December 1905 and January 1906, respectively, and praised the lid as "a fine piece of hammer work". (Note: Both magazines also published photographs of a processional cross and challenge shield designed by Maryon.)

In a 2001 book on the history of the Keswick School of Industrial Art, Ian Bruce termed The Luck of Cumberland a "tour de force". "The cup and cover exhibit the finest craftsmanship together with a delicacy of design which is well adapted to its seafaring home," he wrote, describing the bowl as "bearing the hammer marks of the craftsman decorating the surface like spun silk", and the lid as "a masterpiece raised from the flat".

== Bibliography ==
- Bruce, Ian (2001). The Loving Eye and Skilful Hand: The Keswick School of Industrial Arts. Carlisle: Bookcase.
- Curtis, W. D. (1907). The Log of H.M.S. 'Cumberland'. The Log Series. London: The Westminster Press.
- Rundle, Aylmer Maurice (1951). Manual of Seamanship. Vol. I. London: Her Majesty's Stationery Office.
- "Studio Talk: Keswick". The Studio. XXXVI (153): 263–264. December 1905.
- "Studio Talk: Keswick". The International Studio. XXVII (107): 263–264. January 1906.
