= St Wilfrid's Church, South Kilvington =

Church in South Kilvington, North Yorkshire, England

Coordinates: 54°15′00″N 1°20′53″W

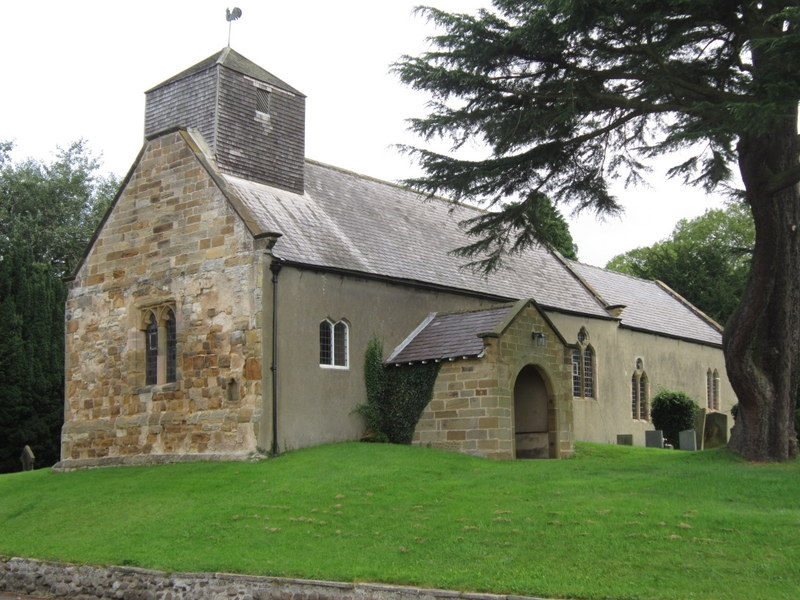
The church, in 2022

St Wilfrid's Church is the parish church of South Kilvington, a village in North Yorkshire, in England.

The church was constructed in the 12th century, with most of the windows rebuilt in the 13th century, and the east window probably dating from the 14th century. The building was heavily restored in the 19th century, the work including the addition of a porch. The building was grade II* listed in 1966.

The church is built of stone, partly rendered, and has a Welsh slate roof. The church consists of a nave, a south porch and a chancel, and on the west end is a shingled bell tower with a pyramidal roof and a weathervane. There are Norman windows on the south wall of the nave and the north wall of the chancel, and the chancel has a remodelled Norman doorway. The east window has three lights with trefoil heads and three quatrefoils above. Inside, there is a 15th-century hexagonal font carved out of black marble. Some of the bench ends are Mediaeval, while the pews were carved by the Reverend W. T. Kingsley, who served from 1857 until 1917.

== See also ==
- Grade II* listed churches in North Yorkshire (district)
- Listed buildings in South Kilvington
