= Mortimer War Memorial =

War memorial in Berkshire, England

- United Kingdom
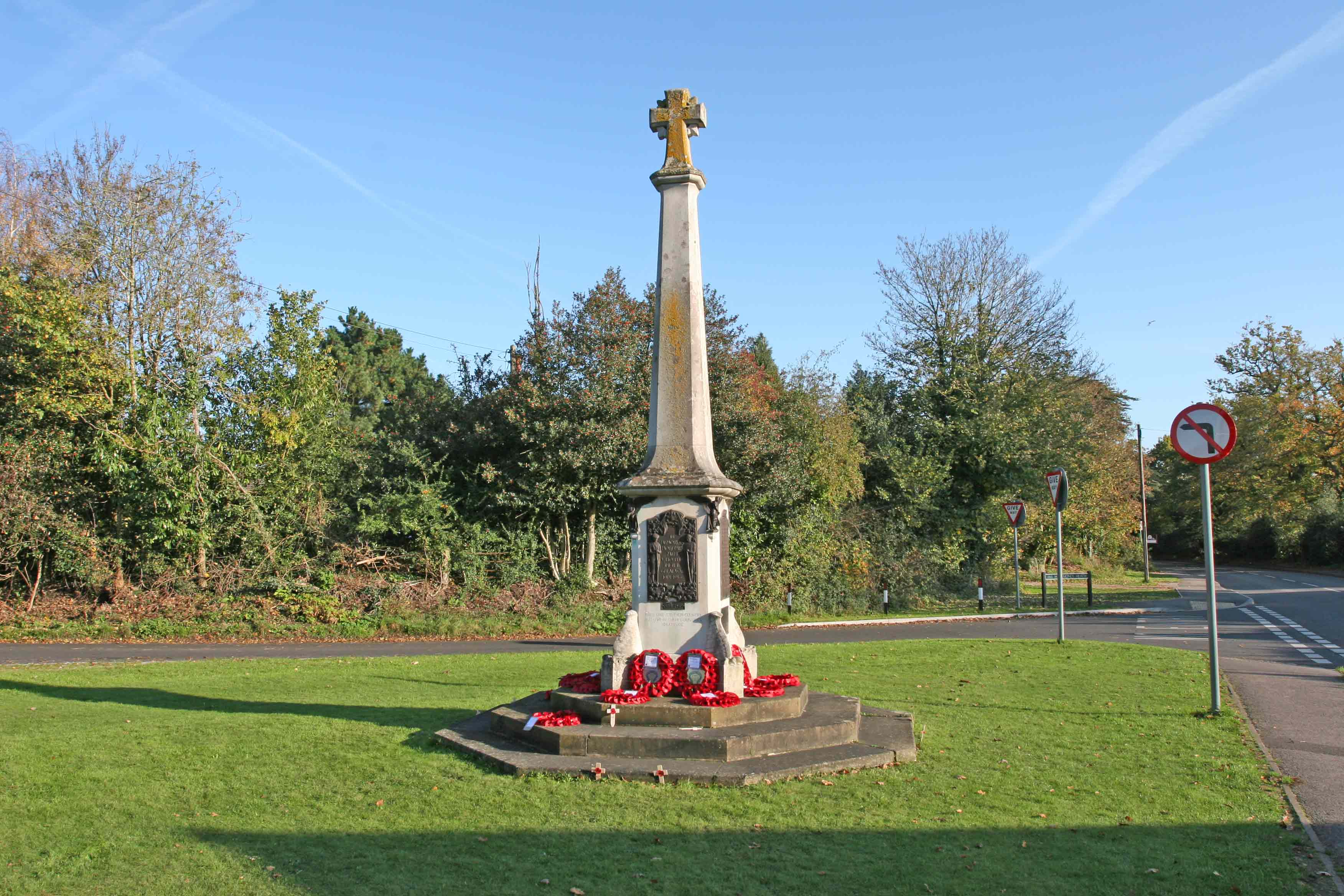
- For soldiers from Stratfield Mortimer killed in war
- Unveiled: 9 October 1921
- Location: 51°22′34.0″N 01°03′28.2″W; Stratfield Mortimer, Berkshire
- Designed by: Herbert Maryon

The Mortimer War Memorial is a monument that commemorates the lives of servicemen from Stratfield Mortimer, Berkshire, England, who were killed in war. Unveiled on 9 October 1921, it was originally intended to commemorate 56 soldiers from the parish who died during the First World War. Subsequent plaques were added to recognise 12 who were killed in the Second World War, and to mark 50 years of freedom from global conflict.

The memorial was designed by Herbert Maryon, who taught sculpture at the University of Reading. It is made of Portland stone and consists of a three-stepped stone base, a plinth, and a tapering shaft that terminates in a Latin cross. Each upper corner of the plinth contains a winged allegorical figure in bronze, each side contains one or two bronze plaques, and the front and back each contain an additional inscription carved in the stone. The front contains both a plaque and an inscription commemorating those who died, and a smaller plaque with the years of the Second World War. The remaining three sides each contain a plaque listing the names of those who died; the left also contains a plaque with the names of those who died in the Second World War, and the right a plaque commemorating 50 years of freedom from global conflict. The rear also includes an inscription stating that the memorial was erected by parishioners in 1921.

== Background ==
=== First World War ===
In the aftermath of the First World War and its unprecedented casualties, thousands of war memorials were built across Britain. Virtually every village, town, or city erected some form of memorial to commemorate their dead.

=== Herbert Maryon ===
At the time he was selected to design the memorial, Herbert Maryon taught sculpture, including metalwork, modelling, and casting, at the University of Reading. Maryon had established himself in the Arts and Crafts movement before moving to academia, and in the years following the war designed several memorials. Among his first was the East Knoyle War Memorial, unveiled in 1920 in East Knoyle, Wiltshire. In 1923 he created a plaque for Manchester's Chorlton Road Congregational Church. The University of Reading likewise commissioned him to create their war memorial, which was unveiled in 1924.

== Commissioning ==
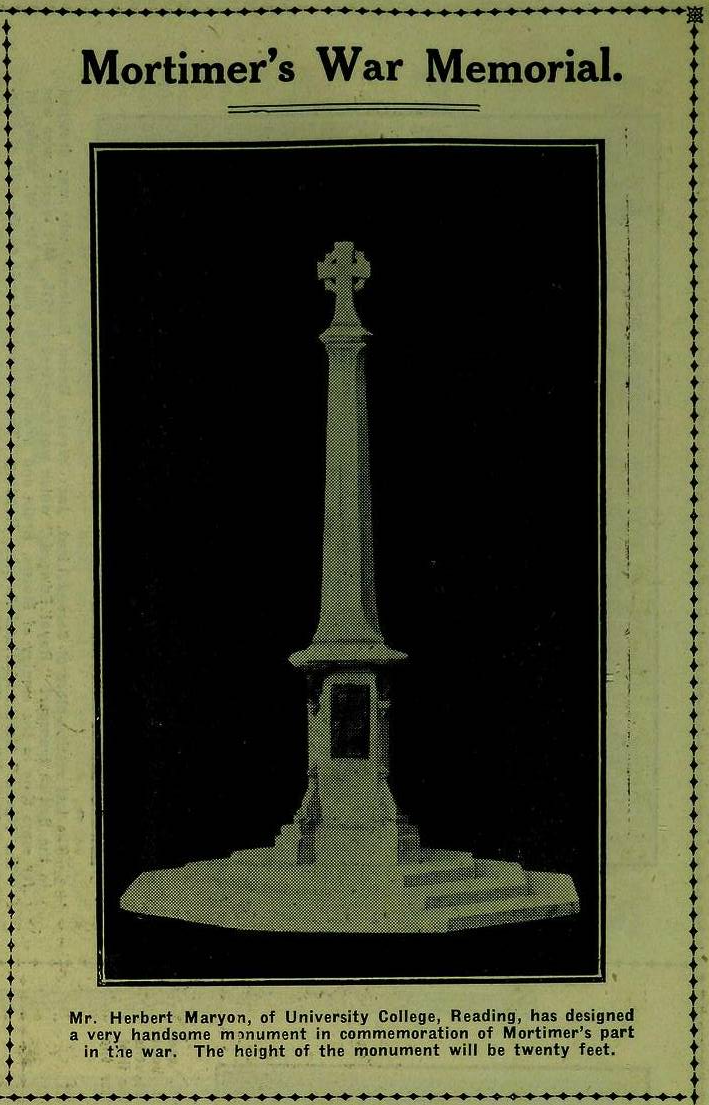
Design for the memorial as published in 1919

A memorial was envisioned well before the end of the war, with ideas and plans regularly discussed in the Mortimer parish magazine. (Note: The magazines are held by the Royal Berkshire Archives. Leading up to the centenary of the First World War, the archives made some of the relevant articles available in posts online.) In October 1916, the magazine reported that a family of one of the dead had suggested that the future memorial take the form of a wayside cross. The magazine suggested that a cross in a churchyard, already full of them, would be of little use, but that "a great granite cross, set high up upon steps, and with a slab recording in leaded letters the names of those in whose honoured memory it is erected, would be something fresh, and could not fail to strike the imagination". The magazine said that the original suggestion called for the memorial to be erected at "the turning leading to the Parish Church", but that there was not enough room; instead, it continued, "on the green triangle opposite to S. John's it would find a fitting position".

Fundraising for the memorial was underway by July 1917. Over the prior 19 months, the parish had collected £90 3s 3d through a monthly collection for a Belgian Relief Fund. With the United States taking over responsibility for such relief, the parish decided to continue the monthly collection, but now in furtherance of the memorial. During a public meeting on 19 November 1918, it was decided to erect a memorial on the green across from St John's Church. Other options that were considered included building a cottage hospital or almshouse. A committee was appointed to consider plans, and a Miss Phelp was named as the honorary secretary.

In December 1918 or January 1919, the committee agreed to a memorial with specific requirements: "(1) that the Memorial take the form of a cross; (2) that the cross should have on one side a bronze plaque with appropriate figures in relief, and an inscription; (3) that names be in bronze in relief on the other three sides; (4) that not less than £500 would be required for a worthy Memorial." By then £60 had been raised and one model had already been submitted, although the committee asked for additional proposals. By April 1919, the committee had recommended a design, and a model was placed on display for public consideration in the garage of a Mr. Methold.

In May 1919, at another public meeting, Maryon's proposal was accepted. The parish magazine stated that this followed "the committee's careful and repeated consideration of many other designs". The location chosen at the prior public meeting was also changed to the final location, which the magazine described as "the Cross roads at the top of the hill near the Pound". On 31 May, The Reading Standard published a photograph of Maryon's design. In October 1919, the committee reported that it had raised £166 6s (with another £100 promised), and issued an appeal for further donations. The appeal was successful, and the following month the parish magazine reported that £453 had been paid or promised, and the remaining £47 expected to be raised that month. The magazine also reported that the stone for the memorial had been acquired, but that the bronze casting was expected to take time; the memorial, it said, was not expected to be completed before the next summer.

Around May 1920, the stone chosen for the memorial needed to be replaced. Further fundraising therefore took place, seeking to raise £175. (Note: Later in 1920 the Pangbourne War Memorial was unveiled, designed by Vera Waddington with inspiration from the Mortimer memorial.)

== Design ==
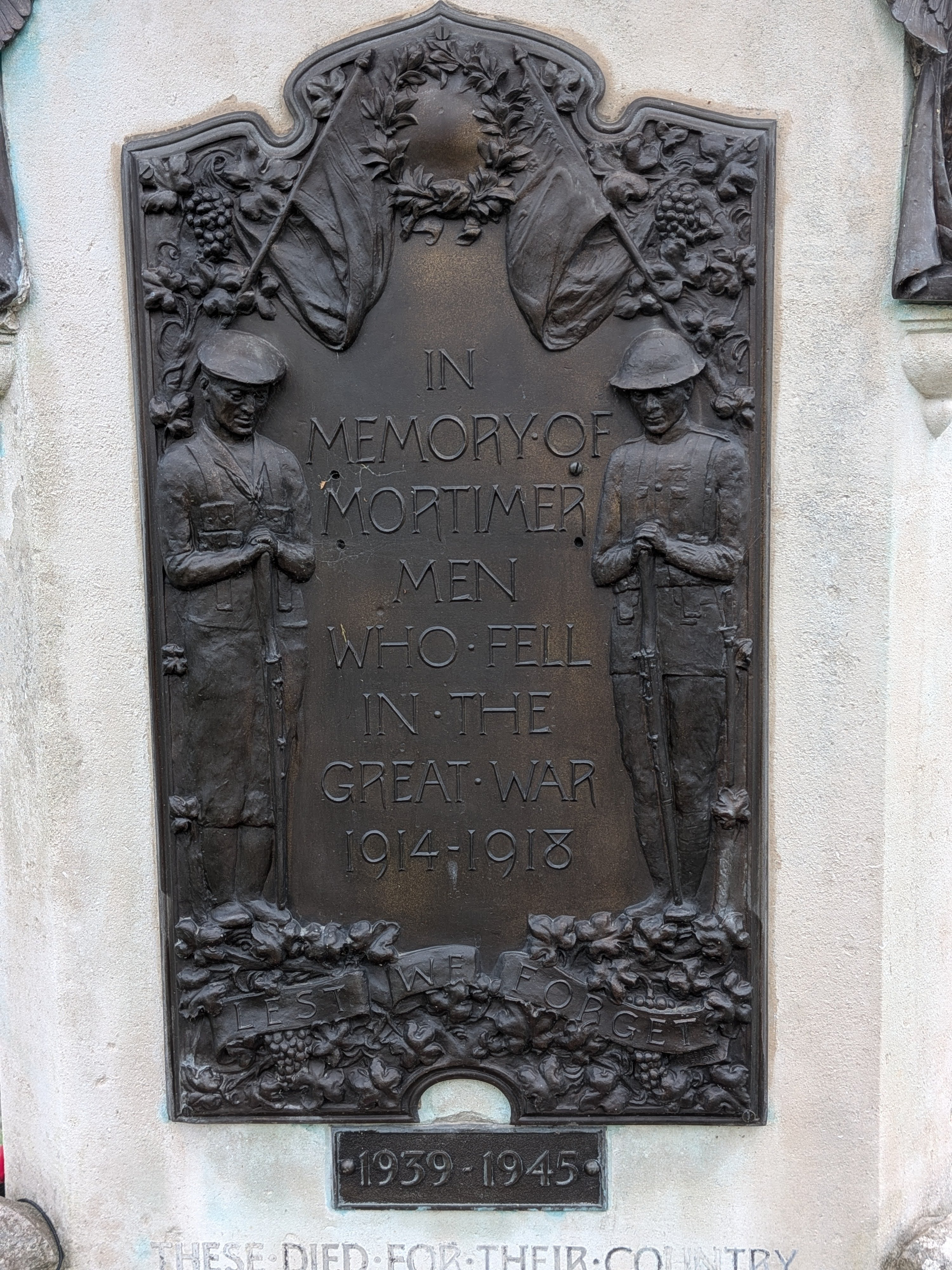
Front plaques

The Mortimer War Memorial is located on a small triangular village green in Stratfield Mortimer, at the junction of The Street and Hammonds Heath. (Note: A mile to the west sits the Isambard Kingdom Brunel-designed Mortimer railway station, comprising the Grade II* listed buildings Mortimer Station, and the waiting station thereto.)

The memorial is carved from Portland stone. It comprises a three-stepped octagonal base set beneath a four-sided plinth, from which a tapering octagonal shaft rises, terminating in a Latin cross. Atop each corner of the plinth rests a gilded and winged allegorical figure, representing Honour, Justice, Fortitude, and Victory.

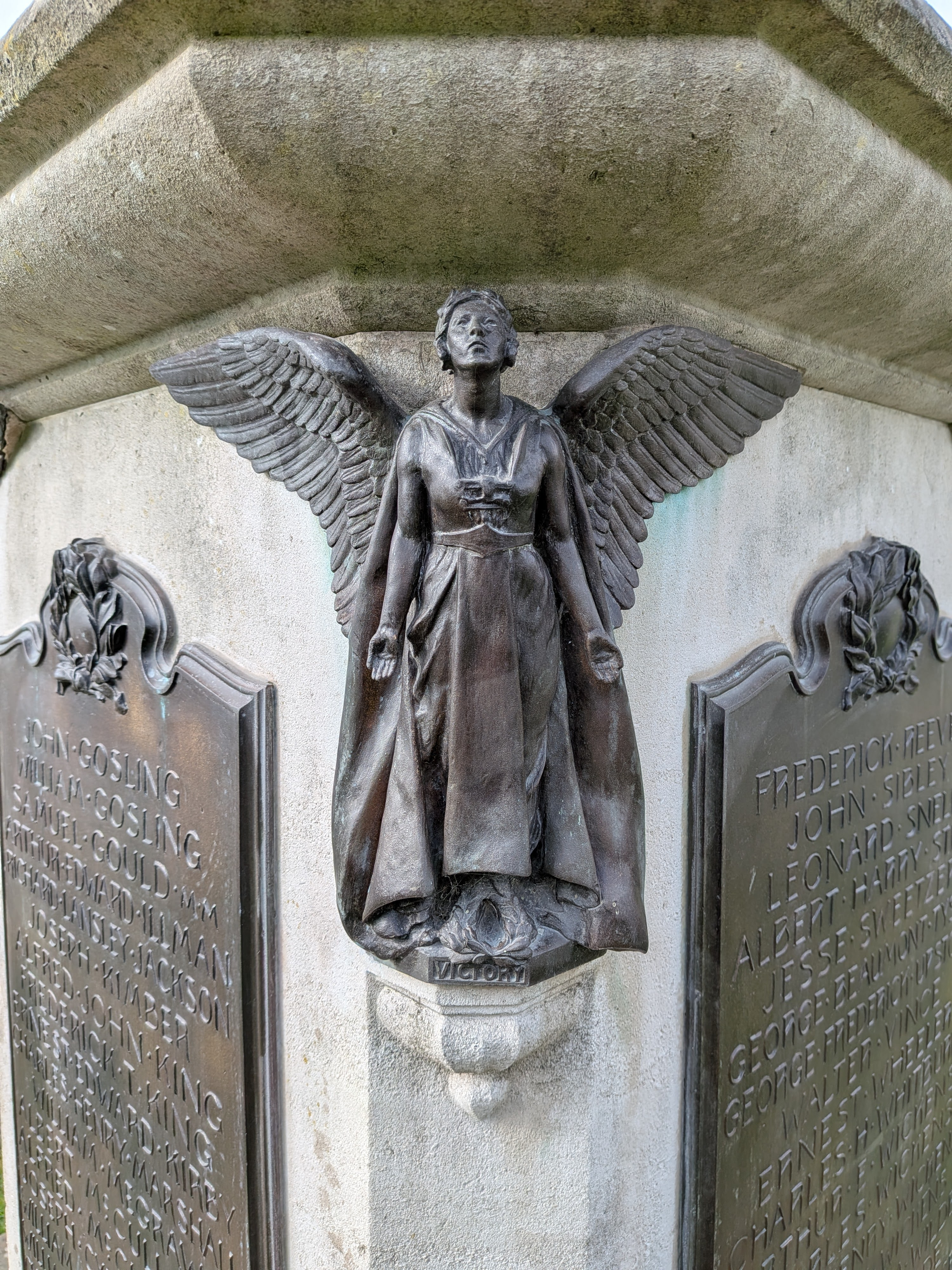
"Victory"

The front and sides of the plinth each contain two bronze plaques, while the rear contains one; the front and rear also each include an inscription carved directly into the stone. The front contains a large plaque with relief of a soldier and sailor standing at reverse arms, each underneath a crossed flag. The plaque includes an inscription commemorating those who died in the First World War, above the words "Lest We Forget". Beneath the larger plaque, a small rectangular plaque includes the dates "1939–1945". Engraved in the stone beneath these two plaques is a further expression of gratitude to those who died.

The remaining three faces of the plinth each contain a large plaque with a wreath surmounting a list of names. The right plaque lists eighteen names, the rear and left nineteen each. Underneath this on the right face, a smaller plaque with the dates 1945 and 1995 commemorates "50 years of freedom from global conflict" and commemorates those who died in pursuit of that goal. On the rear face, an engraving beneath the plaque indicates that the memorial was erected by parishioners in 1921. Finally, the left face contains a smaller plaque below with "1939 – 1945" at the top, and a list of names underneath.

Front	Right	Rear	Left
IN; MEMORY·OF; MORTIMER; MEN; WHO·FELL; IN·THE; GREAT·WAR; 1914–1918; LEST WE FORGET 1939–1945 THESE·DIED·FOR·THEIR·COUNTRY; BUT·LIVE·IN·THEIR·COUNTRY'S; GRATITUDE	ERNEST·GEORGE·ANDREWS; ALBERT·JOHN·BAILEY; ARTHUR·SAMUEL·BARRETT; HENRY·STEPHEN·BARRETT; WILLIAM·BARRETT; ARTHUR·GEORGE·BUSHELL; ARCHIE·WILLIAM·BUSHNELL MM; CHARLES·BUSHNELL; FREDERICK·CHARLES·BUSHNELL; HENRY·GEORGE·BUSHNELL; ALFRED·ARTHUR·CHAMBERLAIN; E·FREDERICK·CHAMBERLAIN; JAMES·CHAMBERLAIN; WILLIAM·JOHN·CLARKE; EDWIN·JOSEPH·COX; JOHN·WILLIAM·COX; ARCHIBALD·W·FARRANT; JESSE·FLITTER 1945 1995; THIS PLAQUE IS TO COMMEMORATE; 50 YEARS OF FREEDOM FROM GLOBAL CONFLICT; AND IS DEDICATED TO THOSE; WHO HAVE GIVEN THEIR LIVES IN; DEFENCE OF THAT FREEDOM AND DEMOCRACY	JOHN·GOSLING; WILLIAM·GOSLING; SAMUEL·GOULD·M·M; ARTHUR·EDWARD·ILLMAN; RICHARD·LANSLEY·JACKSON; JOSEPH·KIMBER; ALFRED·JOHN·KING; FREDERICK·T·KING; ERNEST·EDWARD·KIRBY; CHARLES·HENRY·MARSHALL; WILLIAM·MEGRAW; ALBERT·M^{c}CULLOUGH; ALFRED·M^{c}CULLOUGH; JOSEPH·CYRIL·MONDAY; WILLIAM·GARLICK·NEVILLE; WILLIAM·ALFRED·NICHOLSON; CHARLES·GORDON·PARAMORE; HAROLD·WILLS·PREECE; SIDNEY·RAGGETT ERECTED·BY·PARISHIONERS·OF; MORTIMER; 1921	FREDERICK·REEVES; JOHN·SIBLEY; LEONARD·SNELL; ALBERT·HARRY·STEEL; JESSE·SWEETZER; GEORGE·BEAUMONT·TYSER; GEORGE·FREDERICK·UPSTONE; WALTER·VINCE; ERNEST·WHEELER; CHARLES·H·WHITBURN; ARTHUR·E·WICKENS; CHARLES·WICKENS; GEORGE·HENRY·WICKENS; HAROLD·J·WICKENS; ERNEST·WILLIAM·WILDE; FREDERICK·WILDE; FREDERICK·MORTIMER·WISE; HENRY·FRANCIS·WOODWARD; HARRY·GEORGE·YATES 1939–1945; Robert·William·Anderson; James·William·Fawcus; Kenneth·George·Gleave; Joseph·George·Hailstone; George·Henry·Hale; Frederick·George·Johnson; William·Harold·Blyth·Lesslie; Arthur·Charles·May; Eric·Victor·Mitchell; Walter·James·Wilfred·Wrigglesworth

== History ==
=== First World War ===
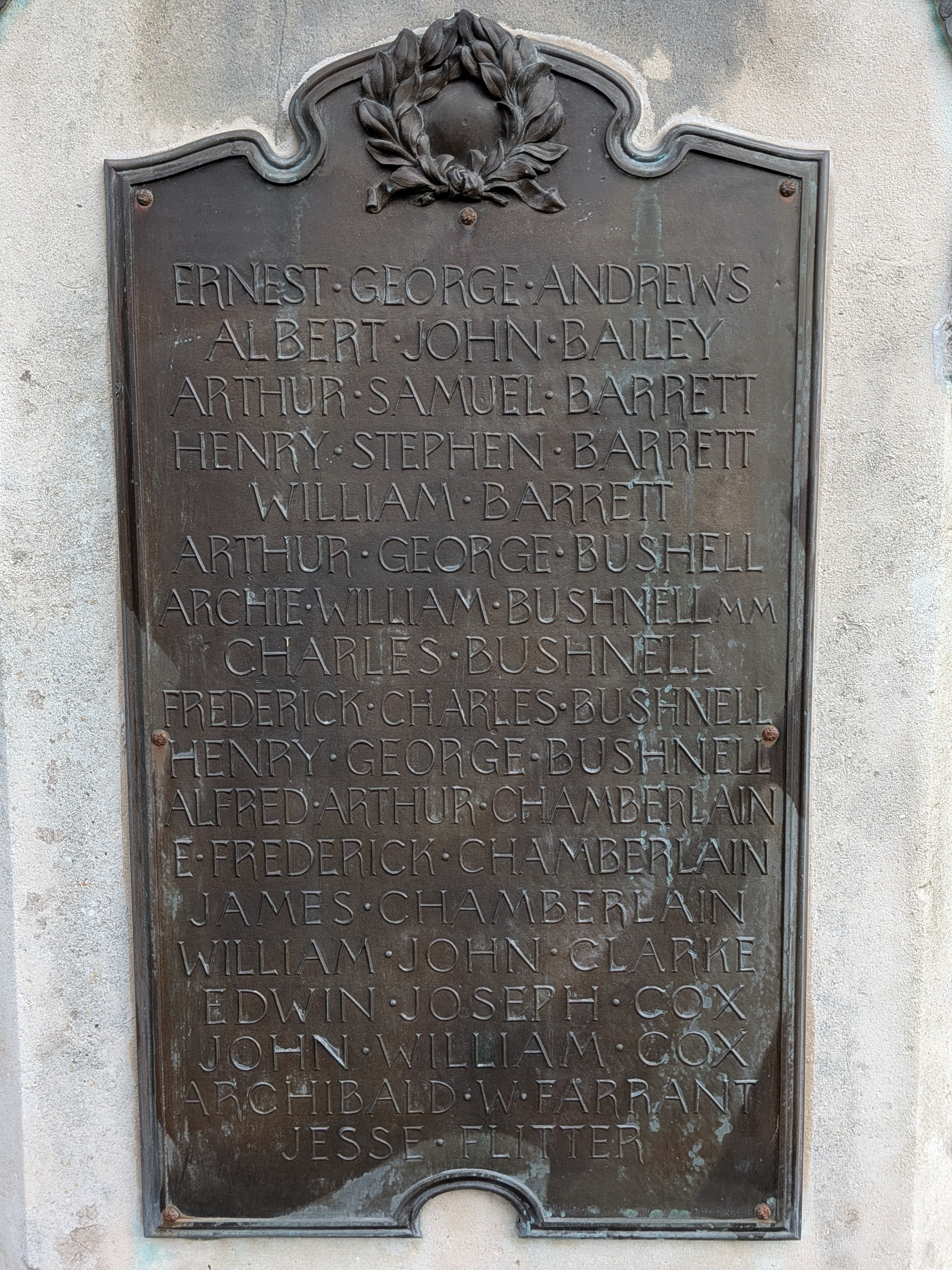
Right plaque

The memorial was unveiled on 9 October 1921. James Herbert Benyon, the Lord Lieutenant of Berkshire, officiated. Also present were his wife Edith Isabel Benyon, Brigadier General Charles Lambton (son of George Lambton, 2nd Earl of Durham), Frances Mary Wyld, and people identified by The Reading Standard as Major R. Wrey, Colonel William Peel Nash, (Note: Around July 1919, Nash and his wife had offered to donate to the parish church a large brass tablet listing the names of those who had died in the war. The memorial was unveiled in August 1920 in a service led by Thomas Archer Houblon.) Miss Hunter, Maryon, John Harrison Gould, Mr. W. Bushell, Mr. H. J. Sharpe, William Ducat (the Archdeacon of Berkshire), Aubrey Baskerville Mynors (the vicar of Mortimer), and Henry John Trevor (the curate of Mortimer). The Mortimer and District ex-Servicemen's Band, led by a Mr. W. Hathaway and including a Mr. B. Ham, accompanied the singing of hymns.

The service commenced with the singing of the hymn "O God, Our Help in Ages Past". James Benyon then addressed the crowd, thanking Lambton and his committee for having invited him to unveil the memorial, and praising the decision to erect it—a memorial, he said, to both those who had died, and also to the qualities they exemplified, such as grit, courage, and devotion to duty. Most had likely lost a relative in the war, he added, asking that those who survived use their relatives' deeds as an incentive to act courageously.

Following Benyon's speech, Bushell, representing ex-servicemen, unveiled the memorial, after which Mynors read from the Bible. Ducat next dedicated the memorial and offered a prayer; the Nunc dimittis was then sung and the Last Post and Reveille sounded. The proceedings closed with a rendition of God Save the King.

=== Subsequent history ===
Around September 1996, as part of celebrations for the 75th anniversary of the Royal British Legion, the organization dedicated the plaque on the right of the memorial commemorating 50 years of freedom from global conflict.

On 14 November 1999, the memorial's left plaque honouring those who died in the Second World War was unveiled. The ceremony was officiated by Dominic Walker, the Bishop of Reading, and attended by approximately 300 people. Peter Johnson—a veteran of the war and brother of Frederick Johnson, who died during it—unveiled the plaque, and relatives laid wreaths and posies. Mortimer's vicar Paul Chaplin then led a service in St John's Church. The Reading Evening Post described the ceremony as the culmination of "a 10-year battle" led by Peter Johnson; the project was ultimately organised by the Stratford Mortimer parish council, which as its Millennium project contributed £2,000 to clean the existing memorial and commission the new plaque, and the Royal British Legion. According to the chair of the Legion, "I really have no idea why this has not been done before. Lack of interest, I suppose."

== Bibliography ==
- Berkshire and the War: The "Reading Standard" Pictorial Record. Vol. IV. Reading, Berkshire: The Reading Standard. 1919. Archived from the original on 29 October 2023.
- Kemp, John F. (2014). "Mortimer War Memorial" (PDF). Stratfield Mortimer Parish Council. Archived (PDF) from the original on 3 November 2021.
- Malone, Carolyn (2018). ""We do not want our war memorials turned out by the thousand, like 75 mm. shells": The Arts and Crafts Movement, Print Culture, and World War I Commemoration in Britain". Journal of Modern Periodical Studies. 9 (2). Penn State University Press: 265–283. doi:10.5325/jmodeperistud.9.2.0265. JSTOR 10.5325/jmodeperistud.9.2.0265. S2CID 203433365.
- Tyack, Geoffrey; Bradley, Simon & Pevsner, Nikolaus (2010). Berkshire. The Buildings of England. New Haven: Yale University Press. ISBN 978-0-30012662-4.
