= Archibald Ross (marine engineer) =

British marine engineer

Archibald John Campbell Ross
- Born: 1867
- Died: 1931 (aged 63–64)
- Occupation: Marine engineer

Sir Archibald John Campbell Ross KBE (1867 – 19 March 1931) was a pioneering marine engineer.

He was 18 years of age when he became a pupil of Messrs. R & W Hawthorn at their St. Peters Works at Newcastle upon Tyne in England, and all his working life was spent with this well-known engineering and shipbuilding company. During Sir Archibald's regime, turbines and boilers for some of the heaviest units in the Royal Navy were built. He attended the National Labor Conference in Washington, USA, in 1910 as an employers' representative. His work on the Merchant Shipbuilding Advisory Committee and on the Admiralty Shipbuilding Council was recognized officially in June 1921, when he was made a Knight Commander of the Order of the British Empire, this followed the Commander of the British Empire honor he had been awarded three years previously.

He served two terms as president of the North-East Coast Institution of Engineers and Shipbuilders, and was a director of Messrs. Ruston-Bucyrus Ltd., specialists in excavating machinery which incorporated the old established firms of Ruston and Hornsby Ltd. of Lincoln, England, and the Bucyrus-Erie Co. of South Milwaukee, Wisconsin, in the United States.

He was also a member of the Institution of Civil Engineers, the Institution of Mechanical Engineers, on the Council of the Institution of Naval Architects, and a member of the Institute of Metals.

He was a lover of music and president of the North of England Musical Tournament.

He married in 1896 and had four sons, three of whom served in the Royal Navy. One son, George Campbell Ross, Lieutenant Commander was Chief Engineering Officer of the battleship HMS Rodney and later Admiral of the Royal Navy. On 16 September 1929 he married Alice Behrens, daughter of the banker Paul Behrens (of Bank Salomon & Oppenheim) in Berlin, the first German women to marry an Englishman after World War I.
